= List of cathedrals in Argentina =

List of Christian cathedrals in Argentina

This is the list of cathedrals in Argentina sorted by denomination, as defined by the Episcopal Conference of Argentina.

== Catholic ==
=== Roman Catholic ===
Indicates the seat of an archdiocese.

Name	Location	Province	Diocese	Metropolitan diocese	Diocese creation	Image
Cathedral of Our Lady of the Valley	Añatuya	Santiago del Estero	Añatuya	Tucumán	1961	
Cathedral of Our Lady of the Assumption	Avellaneda	Buenos Aires	Avellaneda-Lanús	Buenos Aires	1961	
Cathedral of Our Lady of the Rosary	Azul	Buenos Aires	Azul	La Plata	1934	
Metropolitan Cathedral of our Lady of Mercy	Bahía Blanca	Buenos Aires	Bahía Blanca	—	1934	
Co-cathedral of the Nativity of Our Lord	Belén de Escobar	Buenos Aires	Zárate-Campana	Mercedes-Luján	1976	
Metropolitan Cathedral of the Most Holy Trinity	Buenos Aires	—	Buenos Aires	—	1620	
Cathedral of Our Lady of the Rosary	Cafayate	Salta	Cafayate	Salta	1969	
Cathedral of Saint Florentina	Campana	Buenos Aires	Zárate-Campana	Mercedes-Luján	1976	
Cathedral of Our Lady of Mercy	Chascomús	Buenos Aires	Chascomús	La Plata	1980	
Cathedral of Saint John Bosco	Comodoro Rivadavia	Chubut	Comodoro Rivadavia	Bahía Blanca	1979	
Cathedral of the Immaculate Conception	Concepción	Tucumán	Concepción - Santísima Concepción	Tucumán	1963	
Cathedral of Saint Anthony of Padua	Concordia	Entre Ríos	Concordia	Paraná	1961	
Metropolitan Cathedral of Our Lady of the Assumption	Córdoba	Córdoba	Córdoba	—	1570	
Metropolitan Cathedral of Our Lady of the Rosary	Corrientes	Corrientes	Corrientes	—	1910	
Cathedral of Our Lady of the Valley	Cruz del Eje	Córdoba	Cruz del Eje	Córdoba	1963	
Cathedral of the Sacred Heart of Jesus	Esquel	Chubut	Esquel	Bahía Blanca	2009	
Cathedral of Our Lady of Mount Carmel	Formosa	Formosa	Formosa	Resistencia	1957	
Cathedral of Our Lady of Mount Carmel	General Roca	Río Negro	Alto Valle del Río Negro	Bahía Blanca	1993	
Cathedral of Our Lady of the Rosary	Goya	Corrientes	Goya	Corrientes	1961	
Cathedral of Christ the King	Gregorio de Laferrère	Buenos Aires	Gregorio de Laferrère	Buenos Aires	2000	
Cathedral of Saint Joseph	Gualeguaychú	Entre Ríos	Gualeguaychú	Paraná	1957	
Metropolitan Cathedral of the Immaculate Conception	La Plata	Buenos Aires	La Plata	—	1897	
Cathedral of Our Lady of the Candelaria	Humahuaca	Jujuy	Humahuaca	Salta	1969	
Cathedral-Basilica of Saint Nicholas of Bari	La Rioja	La Rioja	La Rioja	San Juan de Cuyo	1934	
Cathedral-Basilica of Our Lady of Peace	Lomas de Zamora	Buenos Aires	Lomas de Zamora	Buenos Aires	1957	
Cathedral-Basilica of Saint Peter and Saint Cecilia	Mar del Plata	Buenos Aires	Mar del Plata	La Plata	1957	
Metropolitan Cathedral of Our Lady of Loreto	Mendoza	Mendoza	Mendoza	—	1934	
Metropolitan Cathedral-Basilica of Our Lady of Mercy	Mercedes	Buenos Aires	Mercedes-Luján	—	1934	
Cathedral-Basilica of Our Lady of Mercy	Moreno	Buenos Aires	Merlo-Moreno	Mercedes-Luján	1997	
Cathedral-Basilica of the Immaculate Conception of the Good Journey	Morón	Buenos Aires	Morón	Buenos Aires	1957	
Cathedral of Mary Help of Christians	Neuquén	Neuquén	Neuquén	Mendoza	1961	
Cathedral of Saint Dominic de Guzmán	Nueve de Julio	Buenos Aires	Nueve de Julio	Mercedes-Luján	1957	
Cathedral of Saint Anthony of Padua	Oberá	Misiones	Oberá	Corrientes	2009	
Metropolitan Cathedral of Our Lady of the Rosary	Paraná	Entre Ríos	Paraná	—	1859	
Cathedral of Saint Joseph	Posadas	Misiones	Posadas	Corrientes	1957	
Cathedral of Saint Roch	Presidencia Roque Sáenz Peña	Chaco	San Roque de Presidencia Roque Sáenz Peña	Resistencia	1963	
Cathedral of our Lady of Mount Carmel	Puerto Iguazú	Misiones	Puerto Iguazú	Corrientes	1986	
Cathedral of the Immaculate Conception	Quilmes	Buenos Aires	Quilmes	Buenos Aires	1976	
Cathedral of Saint Raphael	Rafaela	Santa Fe	Rafaela	Santa Fe de la Vera Cruz	1961	
Cathedral of the Immaculate Conception	Reconquista	Santa Fe	Reconquista	Santa Fe de la Vera Cruz	1957	
Metropolitan Cathedral of Saint Ferdinand the King	Resistencia	Chaco	Resistencia	—	1939	
Cathedral of the Immaculate Conception	Río Cuarto	Córdoba	Villa de la Concepción del Río Cuarto	Córdoba	1934	
Cathedral of Our Lady of Luján	Río Gallegos	Santa Cruz	Río Gallegos	Bahía Blanca	1961	
Metropolitan Cathedral-Basilica of Our Lady of the Rosary	Rosario	Santa Fe	Rosario	—	1934	
Metropolitan Cathedral-Basilica and Shrine of Our Lord and Our Virgin of the Miracle	Salta	Salta	Salta	—	1806	
Cathedral of Our Lady of Nahuel Huapi	San Carlos de Bariloche	Río Negro	San Carlos de Bariloche	Bahía Blanca	1993	
Cathedral-Basilica of Our Lady of the Valley	San Fernando del Valle de Catamarca	Catamarca	Catamarca	Salta	1910	
Cathedral of Saint Francis of Assisi	San Francisco	Córdoba	San Francisco	Córdoba	1961	
Cathedral of Saint Isidore the Laborer	San Isidro	Buenos Aires	San Isidro	Buenos Aires	1957	
Metropolitan Cathedral of Saint John the Baptist	San Juan	San Juan	San Juan de Cuyo	—	1834	
Cathedral of Saints Justus and Pastor	San Justo	Buenos Aires	San Justo	Buenos Aires	1969	
Cathedral of the Immaculate Conception	San Luis	San Luis	San Luis	San Juan de Cuyo	1934	
Cathedral of Jesus the Good Shepherd	San Martín	Buenos Aires	San Martín	Buenos Aires	1961	
Cathedral of the Archangel Saint Michael	San Miguel	Buenos Aires	San Miguel	Buenos Aires	1978	
Metropolitan Cathedral of Our Lady of the Incarnation	San Miguel de Tucumán	Tucumán	Tucumán	—	1897	
Cathedral of Saint Nicholas of Bari	San Nicolás de los Arroyos	Buenos Aires	San Nicolás	Rosario	1947	
Cathedral of the Archangel Saint Raphael	San Rafael	Mendoza	San Rafael	Mendoza	1961	
Cathedral of Saint Raymond Nonnatus	San Ramón de la Nueva Orán	Salta	Orán	Salta	1961	
Cathedral-Basilica of the Holy Saviour	San Salvador de Jujuy	Jujuy	Jujuy	Salta	1934	
Metropolitan Cathedral of All Saints	Santa Fe	Santa Fe	Santa Fe de la Vera Cruz	—	1897	
Cathedral of Saint Rose of Lima	Santa Rosa	La Pampa	Santa Rosa	Bahía Blanca	1957	
Primatial Metropolitan Cathedral-Basilica of our Lady of Mount Carmel	Santiago del Estero	Santiago del Estero	Santiago del Estero	Tucumán	1907	
Cathedral of the Immaculate Conception	Santo Tomé	Corrientes	Santo Tomé	Corrientes	1979	
Cathedral of Mary Help of Christians	Trelew	Chubut	Rawson	Bahía Blanca	2023	
Cathedral of the Immaculate Conception	Venado Tuerto	Santa Fe	Venado Tuerto	Rosario	1963	
Cathedral of Our Lady of Mercy	Viedma	Río Negro	Viedma	Bahía Blanca	1934	
Cathedral of the Immaculate Conception	Villa María	Córdoba	Villa María	Córdoba	1957	

=== Eastern Catholic ===
- Our Lady of Narek Cathedral, Buenos Aires (Armenian Catholic)
- St. Maron's Cathedral, Buenos Aires (Maronite)
- Our Lady of Patrocinio, Buenos Aires (Ukrainian Greek Catholic)

== Eastern Orthodox ==
Cathedrals of Eastern Orthodox Churches in Argentina:

- Annunciation Cathedral in Buenos Aires (Russian Orthodox)
- Cathedral of the Resurrection in Buenos Aires (Russian Orthodox Church Outside Russia)
- Cathedral of the Dormition of the Theotokos in Buenos Aires (Greek Orthodox Patriarchate of Constantinople)
- St. George Antiochian Orthodox Cathedral, Buenos Aires

== Anglican ==
Anglican Cathedrals in Argentina:

- Catedral de San Juan Bautista in Buenos Aires

== See also ==
- List of cathedrals
