= San Fernando Cathedral =

Cathedral of San Fernando or San Fernando Cathedral may refer to:

- Basilica Cathedral of San Fernando del Valle de Catamarca, Argentina
- Metropolitan Cathedral of San Fernando (Pampanga), Philippines
- Metropolitan Cathedral of San Fernando (Resistencia), Argentina
- Metropolitan Cathedral of San Fernando (San Antonio), Texas, United States
- San Fernando Cathedral (La Union), Philippines
- San Fernando Cathedral (Lucena), Philippines
- San Fernando Cathedral (Maldonado), Uruguay
- San Fernando de Apure Cathedral, Venezuela
- San Fernando Pro-Cathedral (Trinidad), Trinidad and Tobago

== See also ==
- Ferdinand III of Castile or San Fernando
