= Esteban María Laxague =

Esteban María Laxague, SDB (standing for Priest of Don Bosco, in Spanish) is as of 2006 the Roman Catholic Bishop of the Diocese of Viedma (Dioecesis Viedmensis). As any other archbishop or bishop in Argentina, his style is His Very Reverend Excellency. Addressing style is Monsignor. He was born in Coronel Pringles, Buenos Aires Province, Argentina -close to Bahía Blanca- on March 4, 1957. His native tongue is Spanish although he is fluent in French (the language currently spoken by all of his family members) and Italian, mandatory among the Salesians.

He completed his secondary education at Colegio Don Bosco in Bahía Blanca, receiving his title of bachiller in 1979. He was ordained priest on May 10, 1982, after which he stayed in Neuquén and Bahía Blanca becoming director of School "La Piedad", belonging to the Order of the Salesians until 1990 when he was appointed director of Colegio Don Bosco in the same city of Bahía Blanca. He spent a year studying theology in Rome. Then he was appointed bishop of the Diocese of Viedma on October 21, 2002, by Pope John Paul II, taking over on a formal Mass on December 21, 2002, being ordained bishop by Monsignor Marcelo Angiolo Melani and his co consecrators: Monsignor Agustín Roberto Radrizzani and Monsignor Jorge Mayer – then archbishop emeritus of Bahía Blanca. His brother, Monsignor Pedro Laxague, is the present bishop of the Roman Catholic Diocese of Zárate-Campana and former auxiliary bishop to Archbishop Guillermo José Garlatti of the Archdiocese of Bahía Blanca.

== References and links ==
- (in English) Roman Catholicism in Argentina
- (in Spanish) Biografía de Monseñor Esteban Laxague
