= Diocese of Rawson =

Catholic diocese in Argentina

Diocese of Rawson Diócesis de Rawson

Catholic
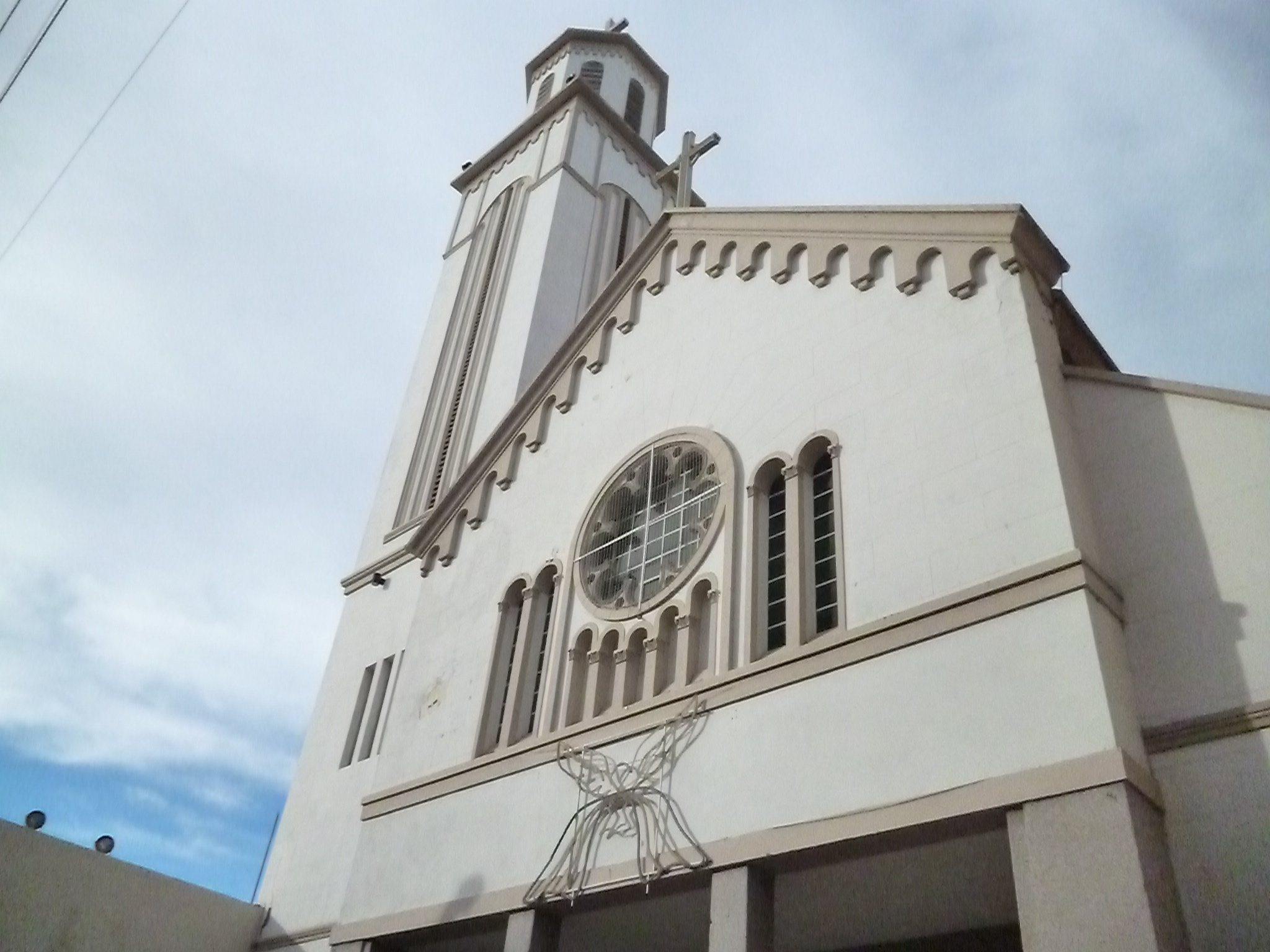
- Cathedral of Mary Help of Christians

Location
- Country: Argentina
- Territory: Chubut departments of Rawson, Biedma, Gaimán, Florentino Ameghino, Mártires, Telsen, and Gastre
- Ecclesiastical province: Bahía Blanca
- Metropolitan: Bahía Blanca

Statistics
- Area: 50,913 km^{2} (19,658 sq mi)
- Population: Total; Catholics: (as of 2023); 242,267; 143,360 (59.2%)
- Parishes: 17

Information
- Denomination: Catholic Church
- Rite: Roman Rite
- Established: October 19, 2023; 2 years ago
- Cathedral: Cathedral of Mary Help of Christians in Trelew
- Patron saint: Mary Immaculate

Current leadership
- Pope: Leo XIV
- Bishop: Roberto Álvarez
- Metropolitan Archbishop: Carlos Azpiroz Costa

The Roman Catholic Diocese of Rawson is a diocese of the Roman Catholic Church located in the city of Trelew in the province of Chubut in southern Argentina.

== History ==
The diocese was created by Pope Francis on October 19, 2023, from territories of the Diocese of Comodoro Rivadavia and made Roberto Álvarez its first bishop. It is a suffragan see of the Archdiocese of Bahía Blanca. With the erection of this diocese, every Argentine province now has a diocese in its political capital. The founding of this diocese has attracted attention and support from local officials.

The diocese was formally created and its first bishop instituted at a Mass on February 17, 2024. The ceremony was led by Apostolic Nuncio to Argentina, Mirosław Adamczyk, and attended by many Argentine churchmen. Among those celebrating were Archbishop Carlos Azpiroz Costa, Bishop Oscar Ojea, and Cardinal Ángel Rossi.

In 2024 bishop Roberto Álvarez described the religious landscape of Patagonia as mission territory. "The Patagonian Church is special, and very different from the rest of Argentina. For example, we are a land of evangelisation, a mission country. This region does not have deep Christian roots".

== See also ==
- Catholic Church in Argentina
