= Joaquín Gimeno Lahoz =

Spanish-born Argentine Roman Catholic bishop (1948–2026)

His Excellency, The Most Reverend Joaquín Gimeno Lahoz
- Bishop of Comodoro Rivadavia
- Church: Roman Catholic Church
- Archdiocese: Bahía Blanca
- Diocese: Comodoro Rivadavia
- Appointed: 15 July 2010
- Term ended: 19 October 2023
- Predecessor: Virginio Domingo Bressanelli
- Successor: Jorge Luis Wagner
- Previous post: Diocesan Administrator of Comodoro Rivadavia (2010)

Orders
- Ordination: 29 June 1973 by Victorio Oliver Domingo
- Consecration: 15 October 2010 by Victorio Oliver Domingo, Virginio Domingo Bressanelli and Antonio Ángel Algora Hernando

Personal details
- Born: 6 October 1948 La Mata de los Olmos, Province of Teruel, Spain
- Died: 30 June 2026 (aged 77) Comodoro Rivadavia, Chubut Province, Argentina
- Motto: Me amó y se entregó por mí
- Coat of arms

Styles of Joaquín Gimeno Lahoz
- Reference style: His Excellency; The Most Reverend
- Spoken style: Your Excellency
- Religious style: Bishop

Joaquín Gimeno Lahoz (6 October 1948 – 30 June 2026) was a Spanish-born Argentine Roman Catholic prelate and missionary who served as Bishop of Comodoro Rivadavia, Argentina, from 2010 until his retirement in 2023.

== Early life and priesthood ==
Gimeno Lahoz was born on 6 October 1948 in La Mata de los Olmos, Province of Teruel, Spain. He completed his ecclesiastical studies at the Minor Seminary of Alcorisa and the Major Seminary of Teruel. He was ordained to the priesthood on 29 June 1973 for the Diocese of Teruel by Bishop Victorio Oliver Domingo.

In 1974 he travelled to Argentina as a Fidei Donum missionary through the Obra de Cooperación Sacerdotal Hispanoamericana (OCSHA). He served in the Diocese of Azul as assistant priest in Tandil and Las Flores, later becoming parish priest of Nuestra Señora de Lourdes in Azul and subsequently rector of Azul Cathedral. He also served on the diocesan presbyteral council and was active in diocesan missions.

In 1996 he transferred to the Diocese of Comodoro Rivadavia, where he ministered in El Maitén, working extensively with Mapuche communities in Cushamen. He later became vicar general, diocesan catechetical director, vice-president of diocesan Caritas, and diocesan administrator following the transfer of Bishop Virginio Domingo Bressanelli in April 2010.

== Episcopal ministry ==
On 15 July 2010, Pope Benedict XVI appointed Gimeno Lahoz Bishop of Comodoro Rivadavia. His episcopal consecration took place on 15 October 2010, with Bishop Victorio Oliver Domingo serving as principal consecrator.

His episcopate emphasized pastoral outreach in Patagonia, social ministries, and support for isolated rural communities. During his tenure he also promoted diocesan charitable and educational initiatives.

Having reached the canonical retirement age, Pope Francis accepted his resignation on 19 October 2023.

== Death ==
Gimeno Lahoz died in Comodoro Rivadavia on 30 June 2026, at the age of 77. His death was announced by the Diocese of Comodoro Rivadavia and prompted tributes from clergy, public officials, and faithful throughout Patagonia, who highlighted his pastoral closeness and decades of missionary service.

Catholic Church titles
Preceded by Virginio Domingo Bressanelli	Bishop of Comodoro Rivadavia; 2010–2023	Succeeded by Jorge Luis Wagner
