= Our Lady of Carmel Cathedral, Formosa =

Our Lady of Carmel Cathedral
- Catedral Nuestra Señora del Carmen
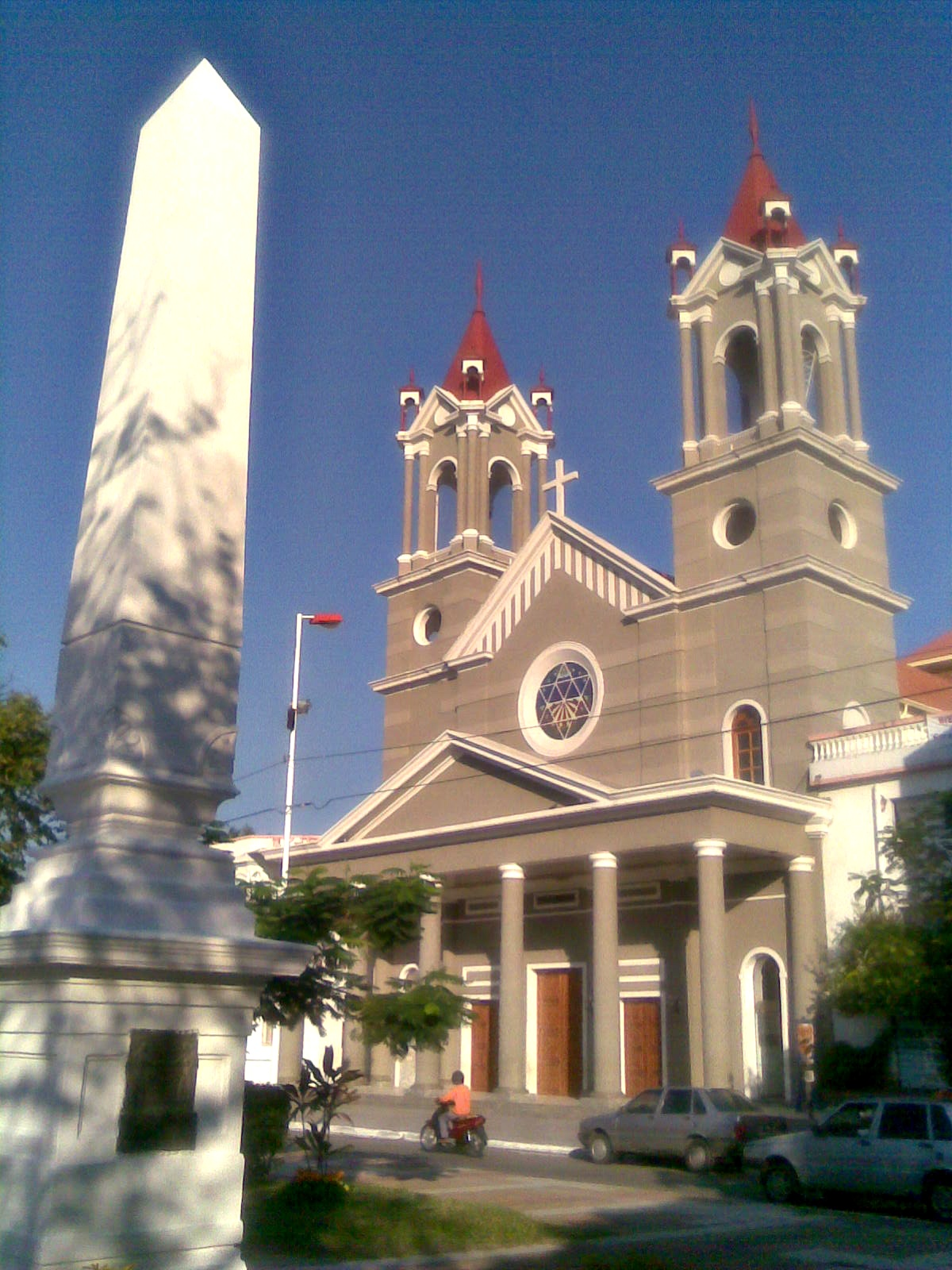
- Our Lady of Carmel Cathedral
- Location: Formosa
- Country: Argentina
- Denomination: Roman Catholic Church

The Our Lady of Carmel Cathedral (Spanish: Catedral Nuestra Señora del Carmen) also called Formosa Cathedral is a Catholic cathedral in Formosa, Argentina. It is the seat of the Diocese of Formosa.

In 1896, construction began for the new cathedral (Av. 25 de Mayo and Moreno) even though the ground had not been paid, but the owner (Manuel Martini) authorized the start of the work. In 1898, Father Gabriel Grotti blessed the new facility, as yet unfinished.

In November 1954 the new Sanctuary of the Virgen del Carmen was opened. In May 1964 the remodeling of the front and the towers of the cathedral began. In 1966 the works were completed for what today is the "Cathedral of Our Lady of Mount Carmel." The cathedral was blessed by the bishop of the diocese of Formosa, Bishop Pacífico Scozzina, O.F.M.

== See also ==
- Roman Catholicism in Argentina
- Our Lady of Mount Carmel
