= Diocese of Formosa =

There are two Roman Catholic dioceses named Formosa:

- Roman Catholic Diocese of Formosa, Argentina (Dioecesis Formosae), erected as a diocese in 1957 from the Diocese of Resistencia
- Roman Catholic Diocese of Formosa, Brazil (Dioecesis Formosensis), erected in 1956 from the Archdiocese of Goiás, and elevated to diocese in 1979

== See also ==
- List of Roman Catholic dioceses in Taiwan on the island of Formosa
