= Virginio Bressanelli =

Argentine Roman Catholic bishop (1942–2026)

The Most Reverend Virginio Domingo Bressanelli S.C.I.
- Bishop Emeritus of Neuquén
- Church: Catholic Church
- Diocese: Neuquén
- Appointed: 10 February 2010
- In office: 8 November 2011 – 3 August 2017
- Predecessor: Marcelo Angiolo Melani
- Successor: Fernando Martín Croxatto
- Other post: Superior General of the Dehonians (1991–2003)

Orders
- Ordination: 17 December 1966
- Consecration: 13 May 2005 by Pedro Luis Ronchino

Personal details
- Born: Virginio Domingo Bressanelli; 1 May 1942 Berabevú, Santa Fe Province, Argentina
- Died: 23 October 2026 (aged 84) Resistencia, Chaco Province, Argentina
- Education: Pontifical Gregorian University
- Motto: Aquí estoy, oh Dios, para hacer tu voluntad

Virginio Domingo Bressanelli S.C.I. (1 May 1942 – 23 October 2026) was an Argentine Roman Catholic prelate who served as the eighth superior general of the Dehonian congregation from 1991 to 2003, as Bishop of Comodoro Rivadavia from 2005 to 2010, and as Bishop of Neuquén from 2011 until his retirement in 2017.

== Early life and education ==
Bressanelli was born on 1 May 1942 in Berabevú, in Santa Fe Province, Argentina. He entered the Dehonian minor seminary at Maciel, Santa Fe, and completed his novitiate in Savona, Italy. He studied philosophy at a congregation college in Monza and theology at the Pontifical Gregorian University in Rome, where he obtained a licentiate in dogmatic theology in 1967. He subsequently studied psychopedagogy in Buenos Aires and qualified as a teacher.

He was ordained a priest on 17 December 1966. He later held responsibilities within the Dehonian congregation in Argentina before becoming its superior general.

== Religious leadership ==
Bressanelli was appointed superior general of the Congregation of the Priests of the Sacred Heart on 24 May 1991. He held the position until 27 May 2003, serving as the congregation's eighth superior general.

== Episcopal ministry ==
=== Bishop of Comodoro Rivadavia ===
On 19 February 2005, Pope John Paul II appointed Bressanelli Bishop of Comodoro Rivadavia, succeeding Pedro Luis Ronchino. At the time, Bressanelli was serving as superior of the Dehonian theological house in Argentina. He received episcopal consecration on 13 May 2005.

=== Bishop of Neuquén ===
On 10 February 2010, Pope Benedict XVI appointed Bressanelli coadjutor bishop of Neuquén. He succeeded Bishop Marcelo Angiolo Melani on 8 November 2011, becoming the diocesan bishop of Neuquén.

During his episcopal ministry, Bressanelli also served as first vice-president of the Argentine Episcopal Conference from 2011 to 2014.

On 3 August 2017, Pope Francis accepted Bressanelli's resignation from the pastoral governance of the Diocese of Neuquén and appointed Fernando Martín Croxatto as his successor. Bressanelli thereafter held the title of bishop emeritus.

== Death ==
Bressanelli died in Resistencia, Chaco, Argentina, on 23 October 2026, at the age of 84, following a period of hospitalization after suffering a stroke. His death was announced by the Dehonian congregation, which remembered him for his service as superior general and bishop.

Catholic Church titles
Preceded by Pedro Luis Ronchino	Bishop of Comodoro Rivadavia; 2005–2010	Succeeded by Joaquín Gimeno Lahoz
Preceded by Marcelo Angiolo Melani	Bishop of Neuquén; 2011–2017	Succeeded by Fernando Martín Croxatto
