= Fernando Croxatto =

Argentine Roman Catholic bishop (born 1956)

The Most Reverend Fernando Martín Croxatto
- Bishop of Neuquén
- Church: Catholic Church
- Diocese: Neuquén
- Appointed: 3 August 2017
- Installed: 22 September 2017
- Predecessor: Virginio Bressanelli

Orders
- Ordination: 6 December 1986 by Juan Carlos Aramburu
- Consecration: 17 May 2014 by José Lorenzo Sartori

Personal details
- Born: 25 September 1956 (age 70) Morón, Buenos Aires Province, Argentina
- Education: Metropolitan Seminary of Villa Devoto
- Motto: Por Cristo, con Él y en Él

Fernando Martín Croxatto (born 25 September 1956) is an Argentine Roman Catholic prelate who has served as the bishop of Neuquén since 2017. He was previously an auxiliary bishop of the Diocese of Comodoro Rivadavia and titular bishop of Fissiana from 2014 until 2017.

== Early life and education ==
Croxatto was born on 25 September 1956 in Morón, in Buenos Aires Province, Argentina. He studied medicine at the University of Buenos Aires for four years before entering the Metropolitan Seminary of Villa Devoto in 1979, where he obtained a bachelor's degree in theology.

== Priesthood ==
Croxatto was ordained a deacon on 15 March 1986 and a priest on 6 December 1986 by Juan Carlos Aramburu, the Archbishop of Buenos Aires. From 1987 to 1990, he served as a parochial vicar at Cristo Rey parish in Buenos Aires and as vice-rector of the preparatory formation house for the seminary.

In 1991, he transferred to the Diocese of San Roque de Presidencia Roque Sáenz Peña, where he was incardinated in 2000. His pastoral and diocesan responsibilities included serving as parish priest of San Antonio de Padua in Santa Sylvina and Coronel Du Graty from 1991 to 1993, rector of the pre-seminary and diocesan director of vocational, youth and missionary pastoral work from 1994 to 2006, parish priest of Santa Cruz in San Roque de Presidencia Roque Sáenz Peña from 1995 to 2001, vicar general from 1998 to 2008, and cathedral parish priest from 2002 to 2008.

In 2008, he became parish priest of San Francisco Solano in El Sauzalito.

== Episcopal ministry ==
=== Auxiliary bishop of Comodoro Rivadavia ===
On 13 March 2014, Pope Francis appointed Croxatto an auxiliary bishop of the Diocese of Comodoro Rivadavia and titular bishop of Fissiana. He received episcopal consecration on 17 May 2014 at the cathedral of San Roque de Presidencia Roque Sáenz Peña. The principal consecrator was José Lorenzo Sartori, bishop emeritus of San Roque de Presidencia Roque Sáenz Peña, with Joaquín Vicente Gimeno Lahoz, bishop of Comodoro Rivadavia, and Hugo Nicolás Barbaro, bishop of San Roque de Presidencia Roque Sáenz Peña, serving as co-consecrators.

He began his ministry as an auxiliary bishop on 30 May 2014. Within the Argentine Episcopal Conference, he served as a member of the Commission for Missions.

=== Bishop of Neuquén ===
On 3 August 2017, Pope Francis appointed Croxatto bishop of the Diocese of Neuquén, succeeding Virginio Domingo Bressanelli, whose resignation from the pastoral governance of the diocese had been accepted by the pope. Croxatto took possession of the diocese and began his pastoral ministry as its fifth diocesan bishop on 22 September 2017.

His episcopal motto is Por Cristo, con Él y en Él (English: "Through Christ, with Him and in Him").
