= Uzita =

Uzita may refer to the following places and jurisdictions :

- Uzita (Tunisia), a Roman period town located in the central Tunisian coastal region, former Catholic bishopric and present Latin Catholic titular see
- Uzita (Florida), a 16th-century chiefdom on the south side of Tampa Bay, Florida
  - also the name of its chief town and of its chief
