= Bahía Blanca Cathedral =

Our Lady of Mercy Cathedral
- Catedral de Nuestra Señora de la Merced de Bahía Blanca
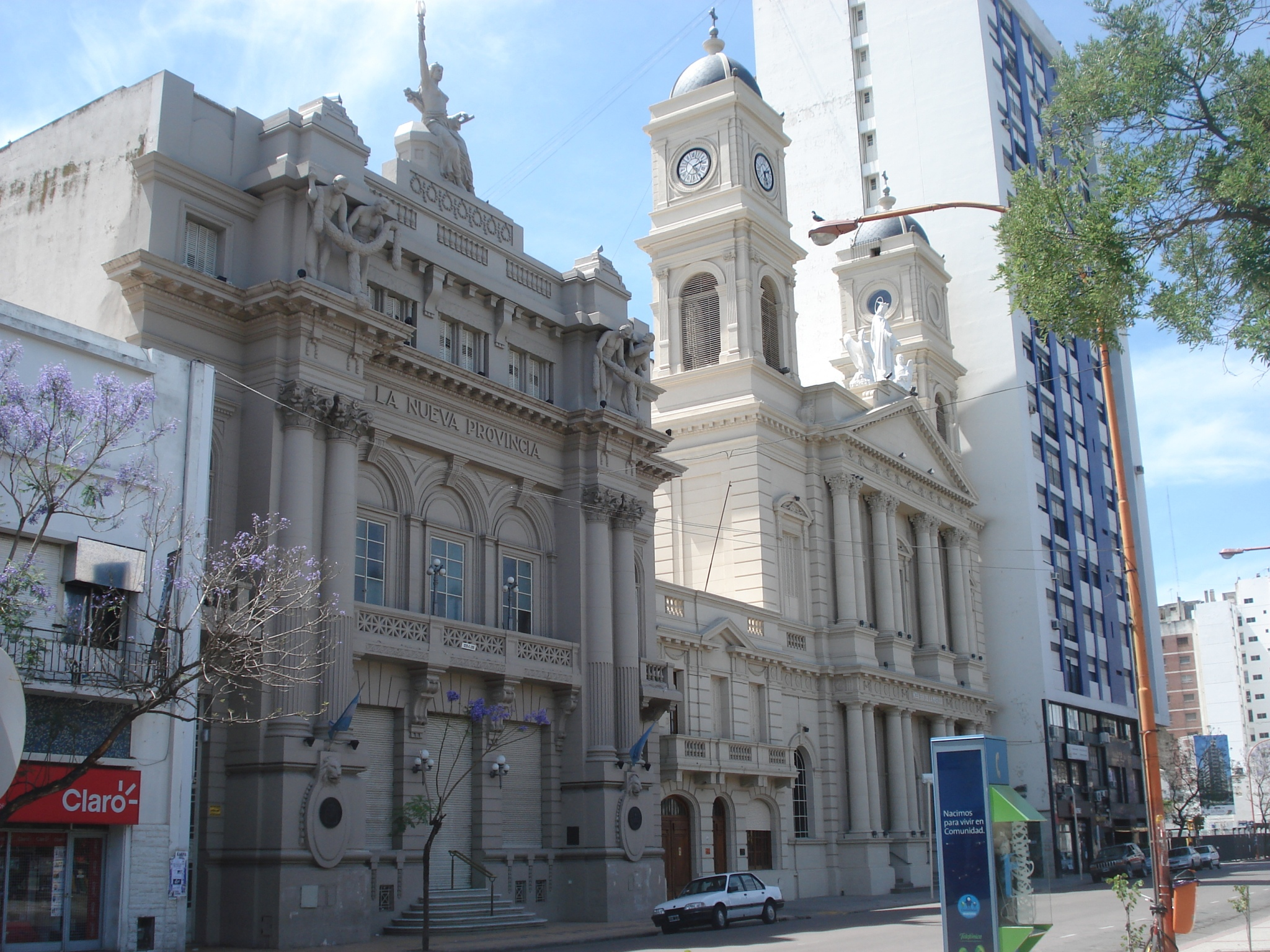
- Our Lady of Mercy Cathedral
- 38.7163°S 62.2663°W
- Location: Bahía Blanca
- Country: Argentina
- Denomination: Roman Catholic Church

Administration
- Archdiocese: Roman Catholic Archdiocese of Bahía Blanca

The Our Lady of Mercy Cathedral (Spanish: Catedral de Nuestra Señora de la Merced de Bahía Blanca) also called Bahía Blanca Cathedral is the name given to a cathedral affiliated to the Catholic Church located in the heart of Bahia Blanca in the South American country of Argentina. It is a building that is protected as it was classified as a Provincial Historic Monument. The Virgen de la Merced is the patroness of the Archdiocese of Bahía Blanca.

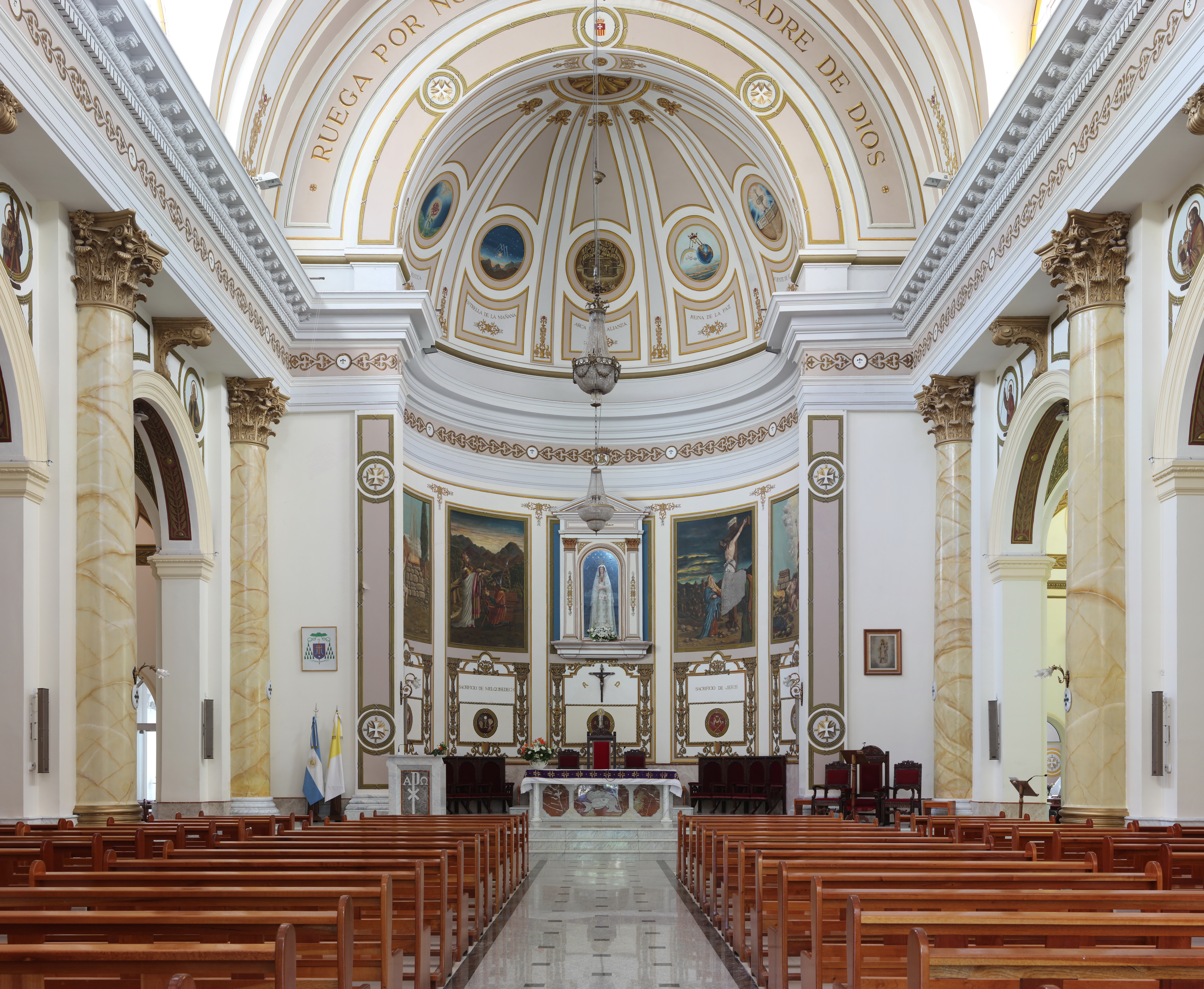
Altar of the Bahía Blanca Cathedral.

The building was directed by Dr. Sixto Laspiur, after the need for an appropriate parish church urban growth. Despite the effort, space only served until 1895. From that year until 1900, will be responsible for completing the project architect Luis Prepani. However, it was opened without being complete, since there were only a ship, and only you add the bell tower in 1903. The two aisles were missing, were completed by the builder Antonio Gerardi between 1916 and 1920. Finally in 1929 enables bell tower and clock stands.

Because of its location in the historic center of the city and its cultural value, it was considered necessary that the building is preserved, naming Monument and highlighting facilities.

== See also ==
- Roman Catholicism in Argentina
- List of cathedrals in Argentina
- Our Lady of Mercy
