= Miguel Hesayne =

Argentine Roman Catholic prelate (1922–2019)

Miguel Esteban Hesayne
- Bishop of Viedma
- Church: Catholic Church
- Diocese: Diocese of Viedma
- In office: 5 April 1975 – 28 June 1995
- Predecessor: José Borgatti
- Successor: Marcelo Angiolo Melani

Orders
- Ordination: 12 December 1948 by Tomás Juan Carlos Solari
- Consecration: 4 June 1975 by Manuel Marengo

Personal details
- Born: 26 December 1922 Azul, Buenos Aires Province, Argentina
- Died: 1 December 2019 (aged 96) Azul, Buenos Aires Province, Argentina

Miguel Esteban Hesayne (26 December 1922 – 1 December 2019) was an Argentine Roman Catholic prelate. He served as Bishop of the Diocese of Viedma from 1975 to 1995. He was born in Azul, Buenos Aires on 26 December 1922. He was ordained as a priest on 12 December 1948. He was appointed bishop of Viedma, Río Negro, on 5 April 1975, ordained on 4 June and installed on 8 July of the same year, at the age of 52.

Hesayne was the bishop of Viedma for 20 years, until 28 June 1995, when he resigned. He ruled his episcopal see during the dictatorial regime of the National Reorganization Process (1976–1983), and was among the very few members of the Argentine Catholic hierarchy to openly criticize its human rights abuses and crimes, such as the murder (masqueraded as a road accident) of bishop Enrique Angelelli by a military task force in 1976. Hesayne died on 1 December 2019 at the age of 96.
