= Corrientes Cathedral =

Coordinates: 27.4692°S 58.8313°W

Our Lady of the Rosary Cathedral
- Catedral Nuestra Señora del Rosario
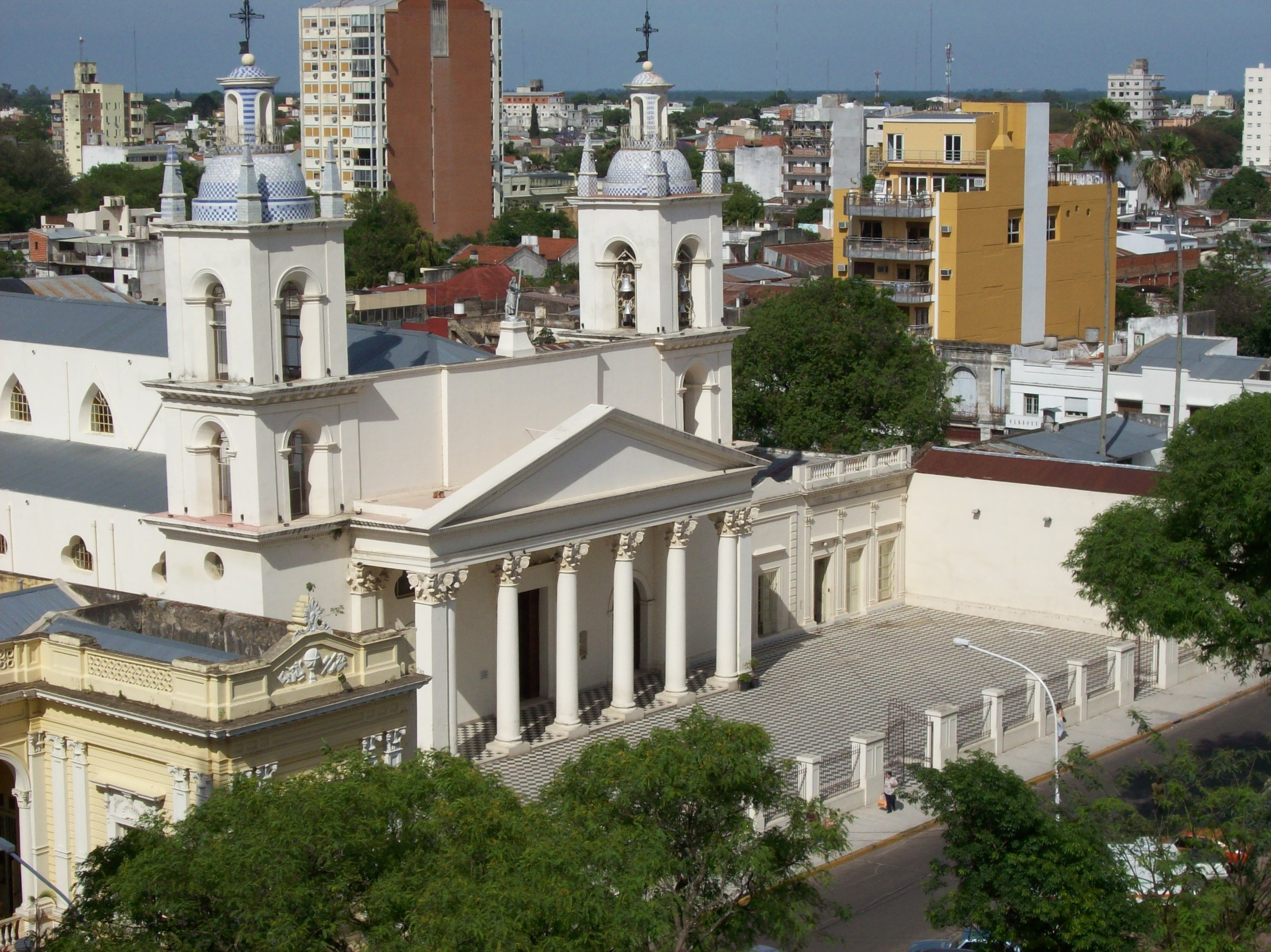
- Our Lady of the Rosary Cathedral
- Location: Corrientes
- Country: Argentina
- Denomination: Roman Catholic Church

The Our Lady of the Rosary Cathedral (Spanish: Catedral Nuestra Señora del Rosario), also called Corrientes Cathedral, is a Roman Catholic church located in the city of Corrientes. Argentina The cathedral is within the Archdiocese of Corrientes. It is located at Hipólito Yrigoyen street 1542, compared to the Sargento Cabral square. It was built in the period between 1854 and 1861, until the building was officially enabled in 1872 with the transfer of the images of the old Mother Church.

It was listed as a Provincial Historic Monument by the 2002 Act in 1959.

== See also ==
- Roman Catholicism in Argentina
- List of cathedrals in Argentina
- Our Lady of the Rosary
