= Hugo Nicolás Barbaro =

Argentine Catholic bishop (born 1950)

- Bishop of San Roque de Presidencia Roque Sáenz Peña
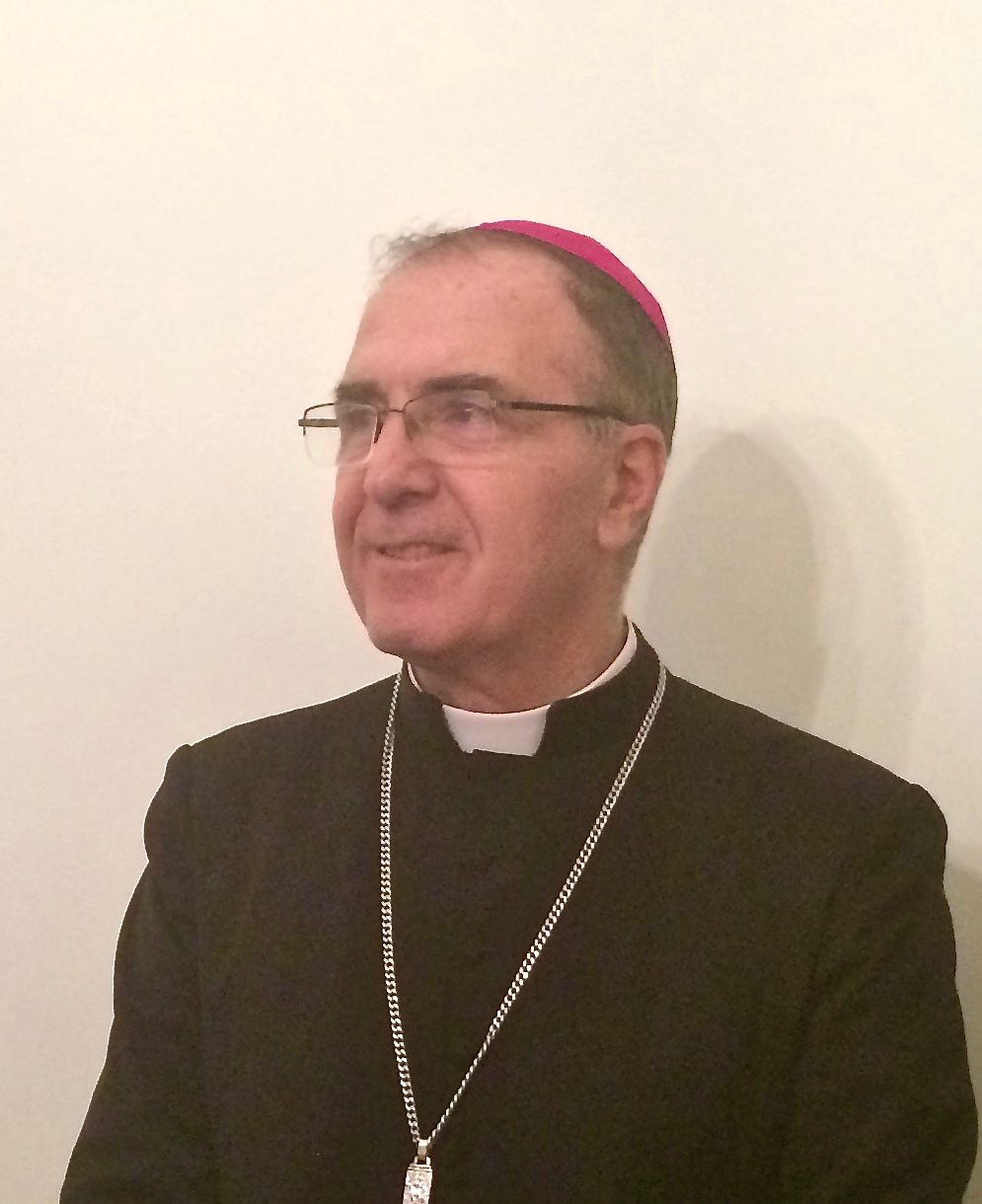
- Church: Catholic Church
- Diocese: Diocese of San Roque de Presidencia Roque Sáenz Peña
- Appointed: 22 April 2008
- Predecessor: José Lorenzo Sartori

Orders
- Ordination: 15 August 1980
- Consecration: 4 July 2008 by Jorge Mario Bergoglio

Personal details
- Born: 12 December 1950 (age 75) Vicente López, Buenos Aires Province, Argentina
- Coat of arms

Hugo Nicolás Barbaro (born 12 December 1950, in Vicente López) is a prelate of the Roman Catholic Church. He serves as bishop of San Roque de Presidencia Roque Sáenz Peña since 2008.

== Life ==
Born in Vicente López, Barbarowas ordained to the priesthood on 15 August 1980.

On 22 April 2008, he was appointed bishop of San Roque de Presidencia Roque Sáenz Peña. Barbaro received his episcopal consecration on the following 4 July from Jorge Mario Bergoglio, archbishop of Buenos Aires, the later pope Francis, with bishop emeritus of San Roque de Presidencia Roque Sáenz Peña, José Lorenzo Sartori, and bishop of Santiago del Estero, Francisco Polti Santillán, serving as co-consecrators. He was installed as bishop on 26 July 2008.
