= Roman Catholic Diocese of Fissiana =

The Diocese of Fissiana (Latin: Fissianensis) is suppressed Latin Church diocese and current titular see of the Catholic Church.

== Location ==
Africa Proconsularis (125 AD)

The exact location for the seat of the diocese is unknown, though Fissiana, is tentatively located somewhere near Foussana in modern Tunisia. In antiquity it was within the Roman province of Byzacena, corresponding to the modern Sahel region of Tunisia.

== History ==
Of this dioceses only two Donatist bishops are known.

- Donato who participated in the Council of Cabarsussi, held in 393 by Maximianus, a dissident sect of the Donatists, and he signed the acts of that Council.
- At the Council of Carthage (411), Bishop Turrasio represented the town, no Catholic competitor attended the conference.

That the town was a stronghold of Donatism is not surprising, as it is located close to the heartland of that movement with many of the first Donatist congregations forming in the semi-arid region to the west and south west of Foussana.

Today Fissiana survives as titular bishopric and the current bishop is Alejandro Daniel Pardo, Auxiliary bishop of Buenos Aires.

== Known bishops ==
- Donato (fl 393) (Donatist)
- Turrasio (fl 411) (Donatist)
- Francis Arinze (Nigeria) 6 July 1965 – 26 June 1967
- Leo Rajendram Antony (Sri Lanka) 3 August 1968 – 15 February 1974
- Joseph Valerius Sequeira (Myanmar) 20 October 1984 – 24 January 1986
- Julio Ojeda Pascual (Peru) 30 March 1987 – 28 April 2013
- Fernando Martín Croxatto (Argentina) 13 March 2014 – 3 August 2017
- Darius Trijonis (Lithuania) 29 September 2018 – 6 June 2024
- Alejandro Daniel Pardo (Argentina) 19 June 2024 - present
