= Paraná Cathedral =

Our Lady of the Rosary Cathedral
- Catedral Nuestra Señora del Rosario de Paraná
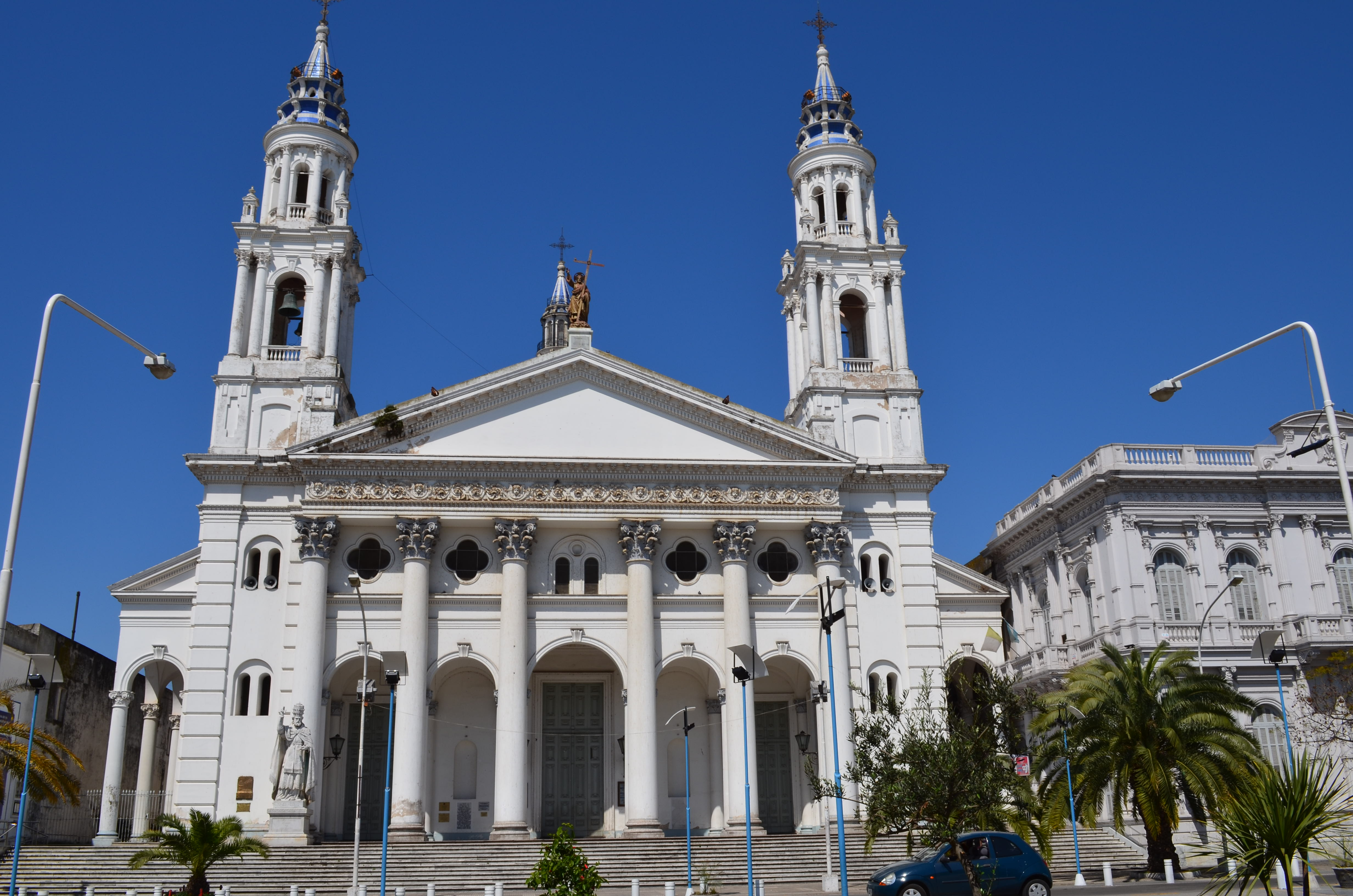
- Our Lady of the Rosary Cathedral
- 31°44′00″S 60°31′43″W
- Location: Paraná
- Country: Argentina
- Denomination: Roman Catholic Church

Administration
- Archdiocese: Roman Catholic Archdiocese of Paraná

Our Lady of the Rosary Cathedral (Spanish: Catedral Nuestra Señora del Rosario de Paraná), also called Paraná Cathedral, is the main Catholic church in the city of Parana, Entre Rios Province, in the South American country of Argentina.

It is located on the street S.S. Francisco (formerly Monte Caseros) between Urquiza and 25 de Mayo streets, in front of the 1 de Mayo Square.

The building, in eclectic style, has two towers and a dome, three naves and at the entrance a statue of St. Peter. It was declared a national historic heritage, so it is one of the most recognized buildings among the city's inhabitants and a popular tourist attraction.

== See also ==
- Roman Catholicism in Argentina
- List of cathedrals in Argentina
- Our Lady of the Rosary
