= Posadas Cathedral =

St. Joseph's Cathedral
- Catedral de San José de Posadas
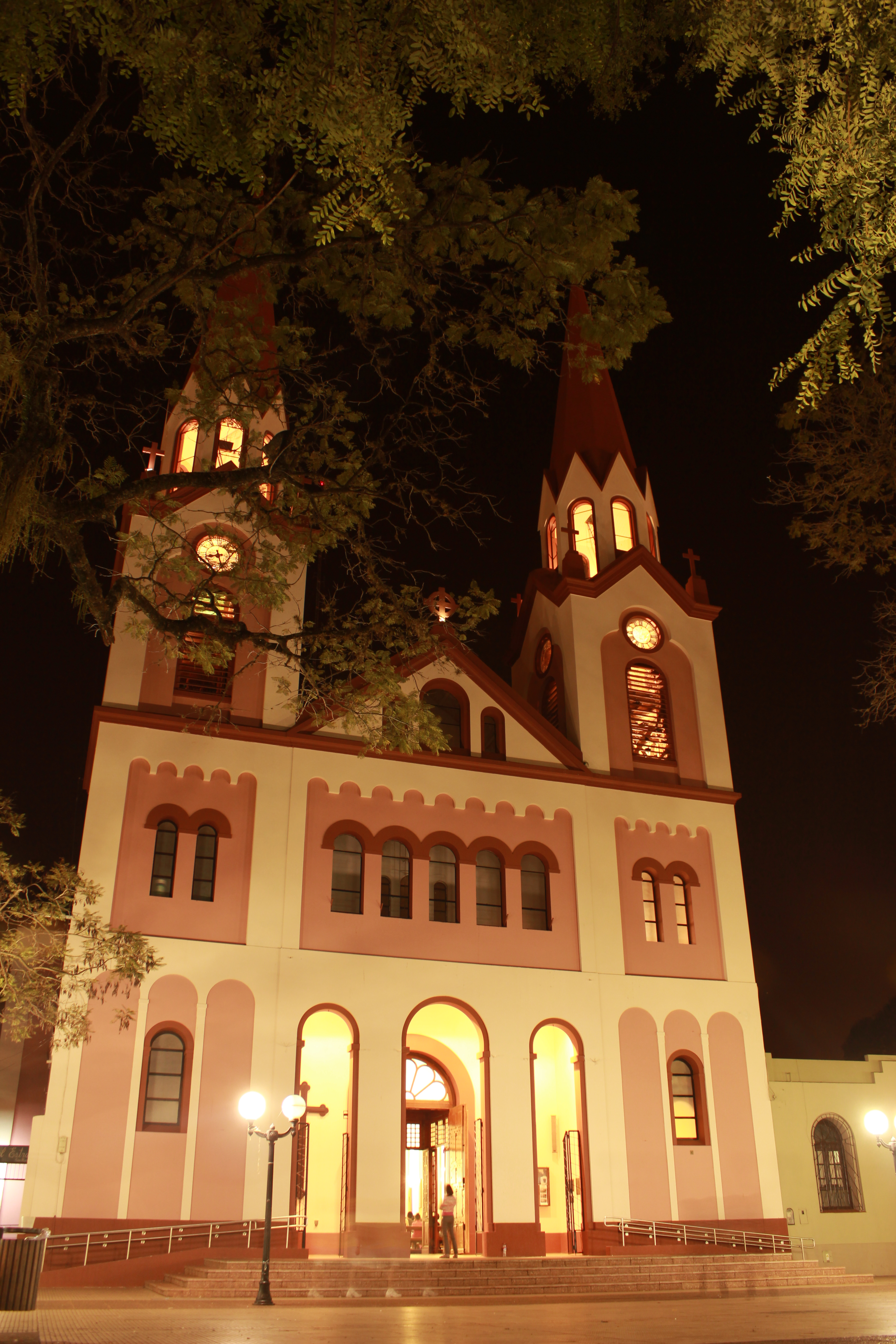
- St. Joseph's Cathedral
- 27°22′S 55°53′W
- Location: Posadas
- Country: Argentina
- Denomination: Roman Catholic Church

Administration
- Diocese: Roman Catholic Diocese of Posadas

The St. Joseph's Cathedral (Spanish: Catedral de San José de Posadas), also called Posadas Cathedral, is the main Catholic church in the city of Posadas, capital of Misiones province in the South American country of Argentina.

It is located at the intersection of San Martin Street (Calle San Martín), and corresponds to the Diocese of Posadas, suffragan of the Archdiocese of Corrientes. His current pastor is José Luis Fernández. It is named after St. Joseph the Worker patron of the cathedral and the city of Posadas.

In 1867 the Battalion 24 of Argentine Army was established in the area and erected a chapel in honor of St. Joseph. Between 1873 and 1874 arises the idea of building a cathedral. The people raise funds and ask permission to ecclesiastical minister of Corrientes.

On January 5, 1876, with the sum of 3,000 piastres building a church that was completed the same year it was resolved. In 1934 came the idea of carrying out a renovation of the church. Work began years later ending in 1937. The front was modified and two new towers were built. As they were disproportionate to the building, they were given greater height in later years. In 1994 new parts were made.

== See also ==
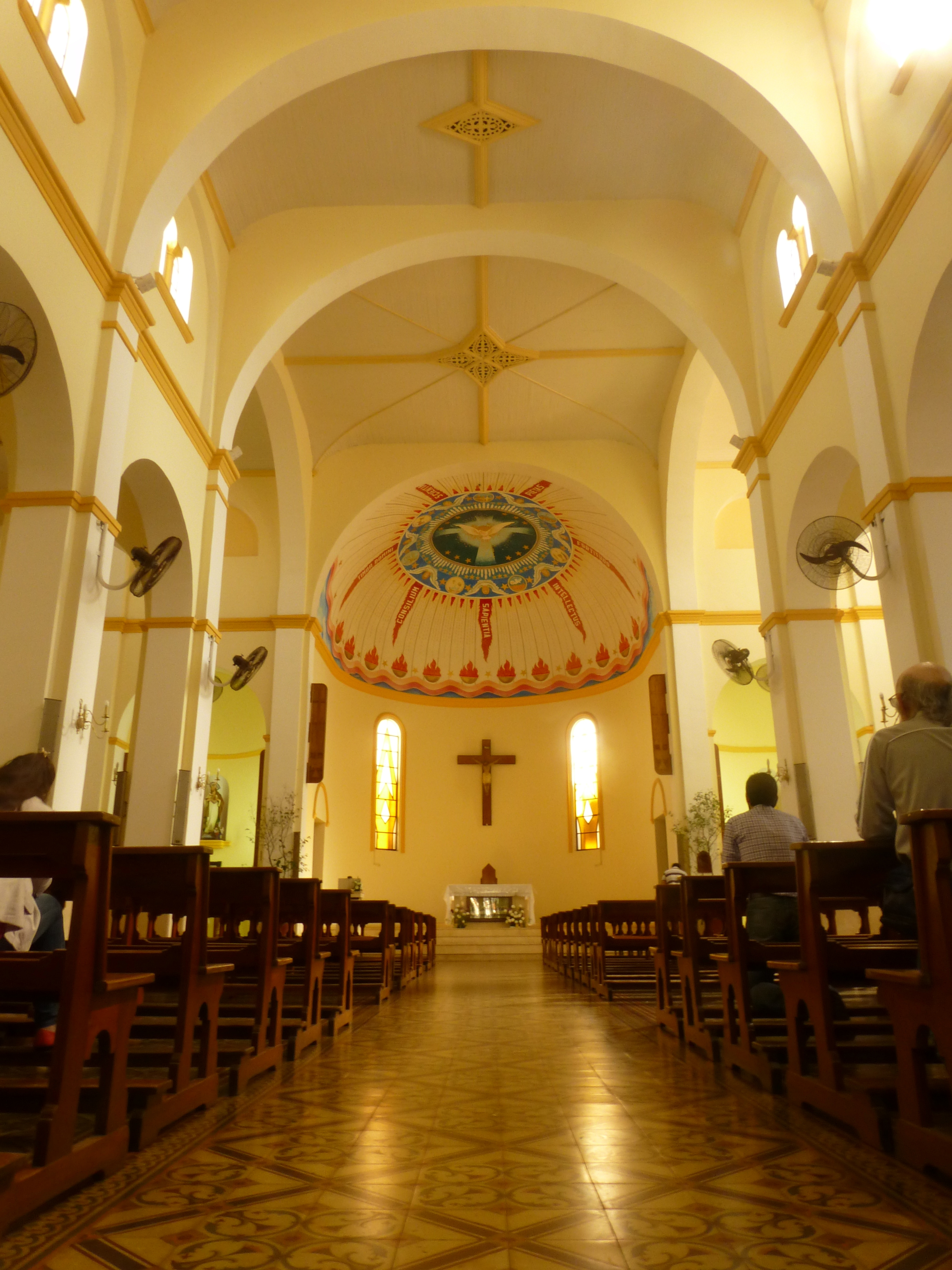
Internal view

- List of cathedrals in Argentina
- Roman Catholicism in Argentina
- St. Joseph's Cathedral
