= Carlos Azpiroz Costa =

Argentine Catholic friar and bishop (born 1956)

The Most Reverend Carlos Alfonso Azpiroz Costa O.P.
- Archbishop of Bahia Blanca
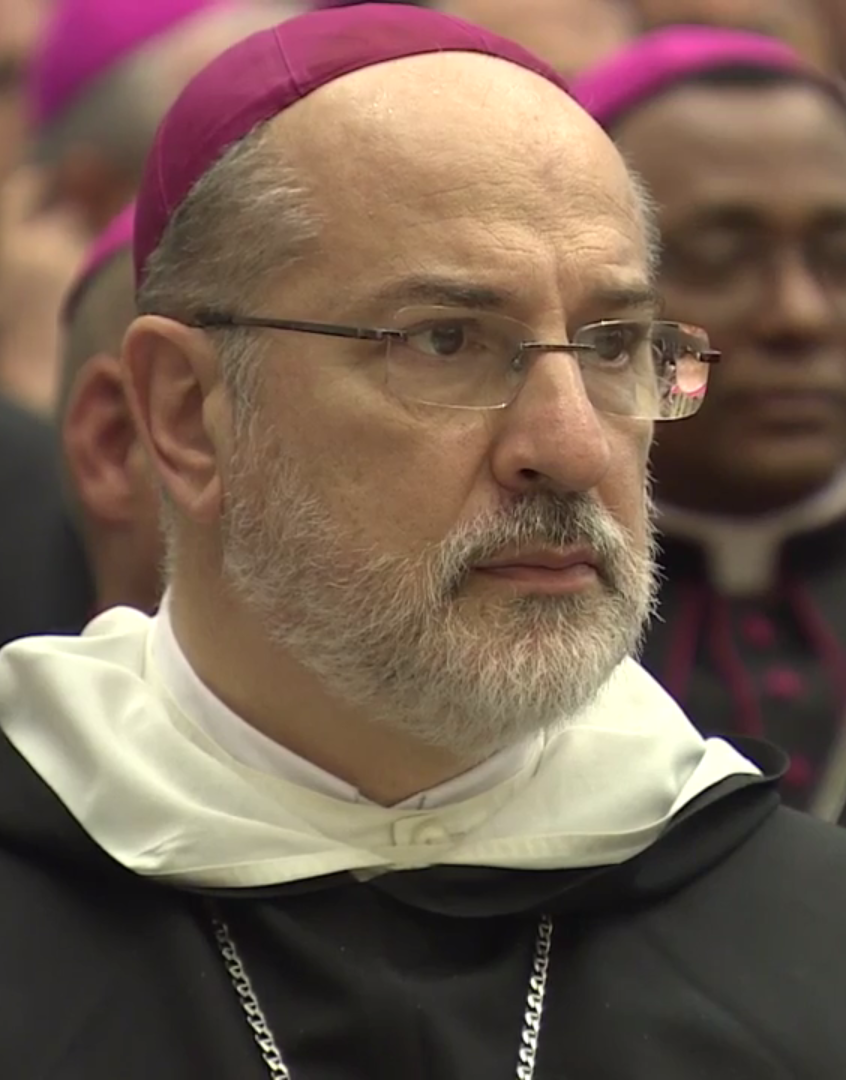
- Mgr Carlos Alfonso Azpiroz Costa in 2016
- Church: Catholic Church
- Archdiocese: Bahia Blanca
- See: Bahia Blanca
- Appointed: 12 July 2017
- Installed: 29 July 2017
- Predecessor: Guillermo José Garlatti
- Previous posts: Master General of the Dominican Order (2001–2010); Rector of the Basilica of Santa Sabina (1997–2000); Coadjutor Archbishop of Bahia Blanca (2015–2017)

Orders
- Ordination: 14 August 1987 by Eduardo Francisco Pironio
- Consecration: 22 December 2015 by Guillermo José Garlatti

Personal details
- Born: Carlos Azpiroz Costa; 30 October 1956 (age 69) Buenos Aires, Argentina
- Parents: Francisco Azpiroz Gil & Nélida Victoria Costa Colombo
- Education: Pontifical Catholic University of Argentina (J.D.); Angelicum (J.C.D.)

The Most Reverend Carlos Azpiros Costa OP
- Master of the Order of Preachers
- Church: Catholic Church
- Predecessor: Timothy Radcliffe
- Successor: Bruno Cadoré

Orders
- Ordination: 14 August 1987 by Eduardo Francisco Pironio
- Consecration: 22 December 2015 by Guillermo José Garlatti

Personal details
- Born: Carlos Azpiroz Costa; 30 October 1956 (age 69) Buenos Aires, Argentina
- Denomination: Roman Catholic
- Parents: Francisco Azpiroz Gil & Nélida Victoria Costa Colombo

Carlos Alfonso Azpiroz Costa, O.P. (born 30 October 1956) is an Argentinian Catholic friar of the Order of Preachers who has served as the Archbishop of Bahia Blanca since 2015. He was previously his religious order's superior general from 2001 to 2010.

== Life ==
=== Early life ===
Azpiroz was born in Buenos Aires in 1956, the eighth of the 14 children (thirteen boys, one girl) born to Francisco Azpiroz Gil (died 1988) and Nélida Victoria Costa Colombo (died 1976). His father was an agricultural engineer who oversaw the large family holdings. His father's parents were immigrants from the Navarre region of Spain, while his maternal grandparents had come from Italy.

As a child, Azpiroz was enrolled at the Colegio Champagnat de Buenos Aires, run by the Marist Brothers, where he completed both his elementary education and his secondary, graduating in 1974. He then entered the law school of the Pontifical Catholic University of Argentina (UCA). After several years of study, he began to feel a certain restlessness about his future. In 1978 he met two professors at the university who were Dominican friars who taught moral theology at the law school. Through discussions with them and visits to their houses, he felt called to join their Order.

=== Dominican friar ===
On 1 March 1980, Azpiroz was admitted to the novitiate of the Dominican Province located at the Priory of St. Martin de Porres, in Mar del Plata. After completing this initial stage of his formation in the Order, he professed temporary religious vows as a friar on 28 February 1981. During this period, he was permitted to take one final exam at the university, by which he earned his law degree from UCA, after which he went on to do his philosophy studies. On 10 March 1984, he professed solemn vows as a full member of the Order in that same priory.

Azpiroz soon received his degree of Bachelor of Philosophy from Saint Thomas Aquinas University of the North (UNSTA), a private university operated by the Dominican Province of Argentina for its young friars. He began his theological studies at the Center of Institutional Studies, which operated at the Priory of St. Dominic of Buenos Aires, under the auspices of the theology faculty of the Pontifical Catholic University, at which he earned the degree of Bachelor of Theology. At the same time, he began his university teaching career, both as assistant of the chairs of theological anthropology and dogmatic theology, at the UCA (in the faculties of economics and law), and also as an assistant professor in the philosophy department of UNSTA. During this period, he shared in the work of his community in reaching out to the people surrounding the priory.

Azpiroz was ordained a deacon on 8 August 1986 by Cardinal Eduardo Francisco Pironio. He was later ordained by Pironio to the Catholic priesthood on 14 August 1987. In September 1989, the Prior Provincial sent him to Rome to study canon law at the Pontifical University of St. Thomas Aquinas (better known as the Angelicum) in Rome, where he was assigned to live at Santa Sabina Priory, the international studium of the Dominican Order. He also fulfilled various offices of the Order while pursuing his studies. In 1997 he was appointed the Procurator General of the Dominican Order, as well as rector of the Basilica of Santa Sabina, attached to the Dominican priory, by then Master of the Order of Preachers, Timothy Radcliffe.

On 14 July 2001, the participants in the General Chapter of the Order, which was held in Providence, Rhode Island, in the United States, elected Azpiroz to succeed Radcliffe as Master of the Order. During his tenure as Master, he was ex officio Grand Chancellor of the Angelicum.

In January 2008, at the General Chapter of the Order held in Bogotá, Azpiroz commented on his experiences in his role as Master of the Order:

As Master of the Order, I am a missionary who strengthens my brothers and sisters scattered throughout the world. I hear their stories and see their reality. I remember the faces of Christian families badly wounded at Bahawalpur (Pakistan 2001), the neighbors of our sisters in the poorest barrios of Kinshasa (Congo), the children following us in Cameroon, in the Civil War Square in Campodos (Tibú), Colombia, families fishing from the canoes off Gizo in the Solomon Islands or in the Urubamba River in the Peruvian Amazon.

Azpiroz served in this office for a nine-year term, ending with the election of his successor on 5 September 2010. Massimiliano Pironti painted Azpiroz' official portrait in oil as former Master of the Dominican Order. The portrait hangs in the Dominican Museum in Santa Sabina in Rome, Italy.

=== Bishop ===
On 3 November 2015, Pope Francis appointed Azpiroz the Archbishop coadjutor of the Roman Catholic Archdiocese of Bahia Blanca. He was ordained a bishop on the following 22 December by Guillermo José Garlatti, the Archbishop of Bahía Blanca, under whom he served until succeeding him as Archbishop on 12 July 2017.

Catholic Church titles
Preceded by Timothy Radcliffe	Master of the Order of Preachers; 2001–2010	Succeeded by Bruno Cadoré
