= Marcelo Angiolo Melani =

Argentine Roman Catholic bishop (1938–2021)

Marcelo Angiolo Melani S.D.B.
- Bishop of Neuquén
- Church: Catholic Church
- Diocese: Diocese of Neuquén
- In office: 9 January 2002 – 8 November 2011
- Predecessor: Agustín Roberto Radrizzani
- Successor: Virginio Domingo Bressanelli
- Previous posts: Bishop of Viedma (1995-2002); Coadjutor Bishop of Viedma (1993-1995)

Orders
- Ordination: 21 March 1970 by Michele Pellegrino
- Consecration: 18 September 1993 by Miguel Hesayne

Personal details
- Born: 15 September 1938 Florence, Province of Florence, Kingdom of Italy
- Died: 14 April 2021 (aged 82) Pucallpa, Ucayali, Peru

Marcelo Angiolo Melani S.D.B. (15 September 1938 – 14 April 2021) was an Argentine Roman Catholic bishop.

== Biography ==
Melani was born in Italy and was ordained to the priesthood in 1970. He served as coadjutor bishop and bishop of the Roman Catholic Diocese of Viedma, Argentina, from 1993 to 2002 and as bishop of the Roman Catholic Diocese of Neuquén, Argentina from 2002 to 2011. He also served as president of the Argentine bishops' commission for pastoral care among indigenous communities (Comisión Episcopal de Pastoral Aborigen).

He died from COVID-19 on 14 April 2021, in Pucallpa, Peru.
