= St. George Antiochian Orthodox Cathedral, Buenos Aires =

St. George Antiochian Orthodox Cathedral
- Catedral Ortodoxa San Jorge
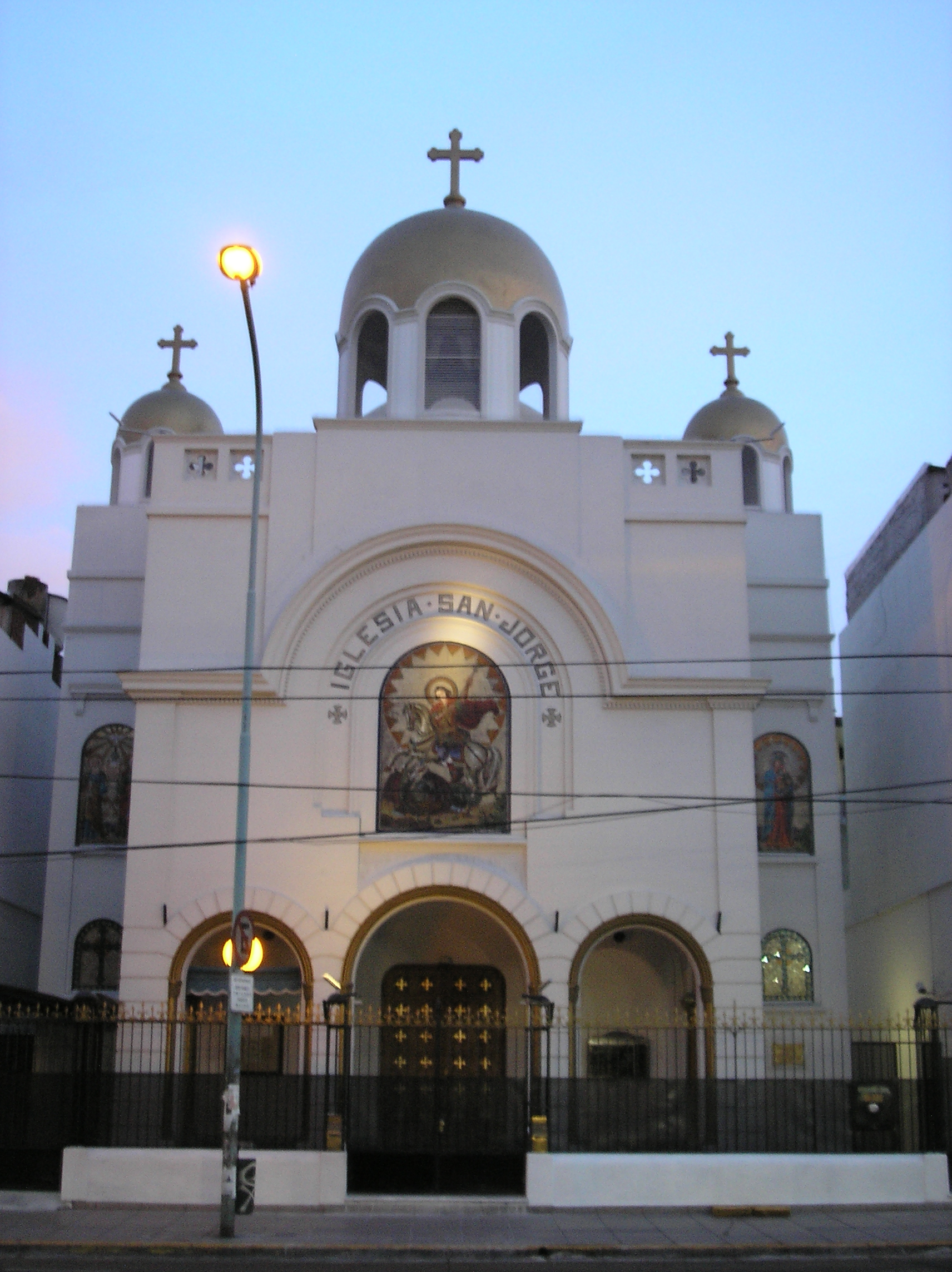
- St. George Antiochian; Orthodox Cathedral
- 34°35′51″S 58°25′43″W
- Location: Avenida Raúl Scalabrini Ortiz, 1261, Buenos Aires
- Country: Argentina
- Denomination: Greek Orthodox
- Churchmanship: Greek Orthodox Church of Antioch

History
- Dedication: Saint George

Administration
- Archdiocese: Buenos Aires and All Argentina

St. George Antiochian Orthodox Cathedral (Spanish: Catedral Ortodoxa San Jorge) is the cathedral of the Archdiocese of Buenos Aires and All Argentina of the Greek Orthodox Patriarchate of Antioch. The cathedral church is located at Avenida Raúl Scalabrini Ortiz 1261, Buenos Aires, Argentina.
