= Territorial Prelature of Esquel =

Catholic particular church territory

Territorial Prelature of Esquel Praelatura Territorialis Esquelensis Prelatura Territorial de Esquel

Location
- Country: Argentina
- Ecclesiastical province: Bahía Blanca
- Metropolitan: Bahía Blanca

Statistics
- Area: 78,074 km^{2} (30,145 sq mi)
- Population: Total; Catholics: (as of 2012); 66,200; 56,000 (84.6%)
- Parishes: 9

Information
- Denomination: Roman Catholic
- Rite: Roman Rite
- Established: 14 March 2009 (16 years ago)
- Cathedral: Cathedral of the Sacred Heart of Jesus in Esquel

Current leadership
- Pope: Leo XIV
- Prelate: José Slaby, C.Ss.R.
- Metropolitan Archbishop: Guillermo José Garlatti

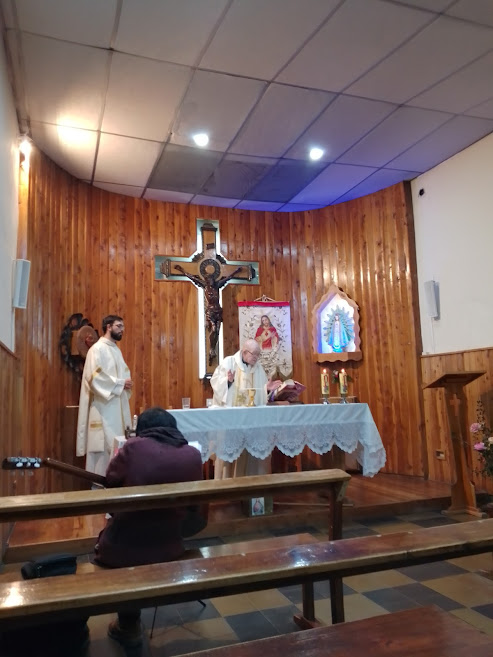
Mass in the Chapel of the Blessed Sacrament in the Cathedral of Esquel, Esquel, Chubut, Argentina.

The Territorial Prelature of Esquel (Latin: Praelatura Territorialis Esquelensis) is a Catholic territorial prelature located in the town of Esquel in the ecclesiastical province of Bahía Blanca in Argentina.

== History ==
- On 14 March 2009, Pope Benedict XVI established the Territorial Prelature of Esquel from the Diocese of Comodoro Rivadavia.

== Ordinaries ==
Prelates of Esquel

- José Slaby, C.Ss.R. (14 March 2009 – present)
