= José Lorenzo Sartori =

Argentine Roman Catholic bishop (1932–2018)

- Bishop of San Roque de Presidencia Roque Sáenz Peña
- Church: Catholic Church
- Diocese: Diocese of San Roque de Presidencia Roque Sáenz Peña
- In office: 27 August 1994 – 22 April 2008
- Predecessor: Abelardo Francisco Silva
- Successor: Hugo Nicolás Barbaro

Orders
- Ordination: 2 December 1956 by Antonio Rocca
- Consecration: 19 November 1994 by Abelardo Francisco Silva

Personal details
- Born: 24 May 1932 Concepción del Uruguay, Entre Ríos Province, Argentina
- Died: 2 October 2018 (aged 86)

José Lorenzo Sartori (24 May 1932 – 2 October 2018) was an Argentine Roman Catholic bishop.

Sartori was born in Argentina and was ordained to the priesthood in 1956. He served as bishop of the Roman Catholic Diocese of San Roque de Presidencia Roque Sáenz Peña, Argentina, from 1994 to 2008.
