= Diocese of Viedma =

Catholic ecclesiastical territory

Diocese of Viedma Dioecesis Viedmensis Diócesis de Viedma

Catholic

Location
- Country: Argentina
- Ecclesiastical province: Bahía Blanca
- Metropolitan: Bahía Blanca

Statistics
- Area: 89,000 km^{2} (34,000 sq mi)
- Population: Total; Catholics: (as of 2010); 157,000; 115,000 (73.2%)
- Parishes: 15

Information
- Denomination: Catholic
- Sui iuris church: Latin Church
- Rite: Roman Rite
- Established: 20 April 1934 (92 years ago)
- Cathedral: Cathedral of Our lady of Mercy in Viedma, Río Negro
- Patron saint: Mary Help of Christians

Current leadership
- Pope: Leo XIV
- Bishop: Esteban María Laxague
- Metropolitan Archbishop: Carlos Alfonso Azpiroz Costa

The Roman Catholic Diocese of Viedma (Dioecesis Viedmensis) is encompassed in the Ecclesiastical Province of Bahía Blanca. The Diocese was erected on April 20, 1934. It is suffragant to the Metropolitan Archdiocese of Bahía Blanca.

As of 2006 the Bishop was Monsignor Esteban María Laxague, Salesian of Don Bosco, appointed by Pope John Paul II on October 31, 2002. His predecessor was HVRE Marcelo Angiolo Melani, Bishop from June 28, 1995 until 2002, when Laxague took over.

Located in the Rio Negro Province, Argentina, the diocese has its see in the City of Viedma, by the shores of Río Negro River and close to the coast of the Atlantic Ocean. It encompasses a surface of about 89,000 square kilometers (34,000 sq mi).

In 1953, the diocese was dedicated "to the Missionary Virgin, promoted by the Diocese’s second Bishop, Monsignor Miguel Hesayne (1975-1993)."

The diocese was the site of a pilgrimage in honor of Brother Zatti.

== Bishops ==
The Bishops of Viedma have been:

=== Ordinaries ===
- Nicolás Esandi, S.D.B. † (13 September 1934 – 29 August 1948) Died
- José Borgatti, S.D.B. † (28 August 1953 – 26 October 1973) Died
- Miguel Esteban Hesayne † (5 April 1975 – 28 June 1995) Resigned
- Marcelo Angiolo Melani, S.D.B. (28 June 1995 – 9 January 2002) Appointed, Bishop of Neuquén
- Esteban María Laxague, S.D.B. (31 October 2002 – Present)

=== Coadjutor bishop ===
- Marcelo Angiolo Melani, S.D.B. (1993-1995)

=== Auxiliary bishops ===
- Miguel Angel Alemán Eslava, S.D.B. (1968-1975), appointed Bishop of Río Gallegos
- Carmelo Juan Giaquinta (1980-1986), appointed Bishop of Posadas

== See also ==
- Roman Catholicism in Argentina
- Apostolic Vicariate of Northern Patagonia
