= Pedro Luis Ronchino =

Argentinian priest (1928–2020)

Pedro Luis Ronchino SDB
- Bishop of Comodoro Rivadavia
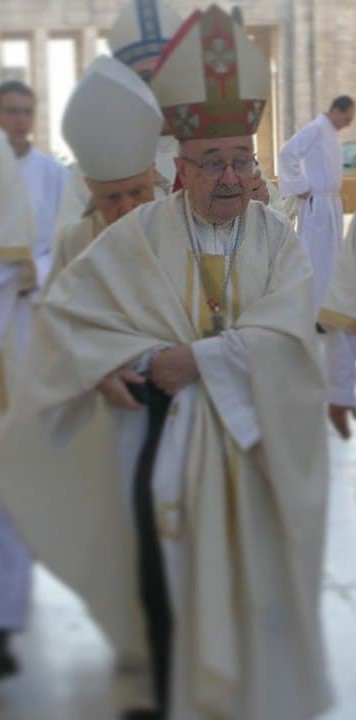
- Pedro Luis Ronchino in 2020
- Church: Catholic Church
- Diocese: Diocese of Comodoro Rivadavia
- In office: 30 January 1993 – 19 February 2005
- Predecessor: Argimiro Daniel Moure Piñeiro
- Successor: Virginio Domingo Bressanelli

Orders
- Ordination: 1 August 1954
- Consecration: 19 March 1993 by Antonio Quarracino

Personal details
- Born: 18 June 1928 Rosario, Santa Fe Province, Argentina
- Died: 1 July 2020 (aged 92) Córdoba, Córdoba Province, Argentina

Pedro Luis Ronchino (18 June 1928 – 1 July 2020) was an Argentine Roman Catholic bishop.

Ronchino was born in Argentina and was ordained to the priesthood in 1954. He served as bishop of the Roman Catholic Diocese of Comodoro Rivadavia, Argentina, from 1993 until 2005.
