= Diocese of San Roque de Presidencia Roque Sáenz Peña =

Catholic ecclesiastical territory

Diocese of San Roque de Presidencia Roque Sáenz Peña Dioecesis Sancti Rochi Diócesis de San Roque de Presidencia Roque Sáenz Peña

Catholic
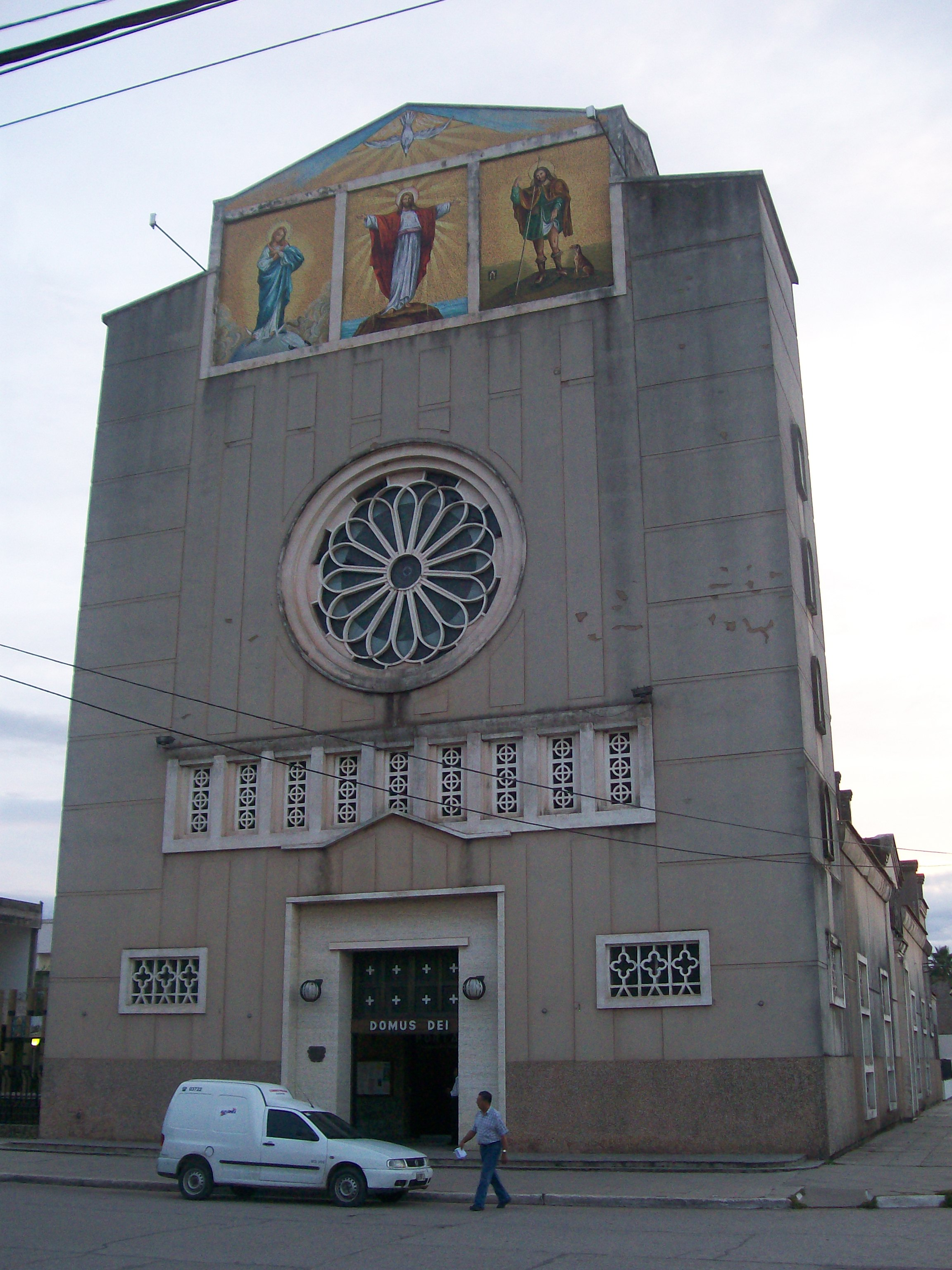
- Cathedral of Saint Roch

Location
- Country: Argentina
- Ecclesiastical province: Resistencia
- Metropolitan: Resistencia

Statistics
- Area: 71,303 km^{2} (27,530 sq mi)
- Population: Total; Catholics: (as of 2010); 511,000; 436,000 (85.3%)
- Parishes: 24

Information
- Denomination: Roman Catholic
- Rite: Roman Rite
- Established: 12 August 1963 (63 years ago)
- Cathedral: Cathedral of St Roch in Presidencia Roque Sáenz Peña
- Patron saint: Saint Roch; Immaculate Conception

Current leadership
- Pope: Leo XIV
- Bishop: Hugo Nicolás Barbaro
- Metropolitan Archbishop: Fabriciano Sigampa
- Auxiliary Bishops: Gustavo Alejandro Montini
- Bishops emeritus: José Lorenzo Sartori

Website
- Website of the Diocese

The Roman Catholic Diocese of San Roque de Presidencia Roque Sáenz Peña is located in the town of San Roque in the city of Presidencia Roque Sáenz Peña, usually referred to as simply Sáenz Peña, in the province of Chaco, Argentina.

== History ==
On 12 August 1963, Pope Paul VI established the Diocese of Presidencia Roque Sáenz Peña from the Diocese of Resistencia. Its name was changed to the Diocese of San Roque de Presidencia Roque Sáenz Peña on 28 February 1992 by Blessed John Paul II.

== Bishops ==
=== Ordinaries ===
- Ítalo Severino Di Stéfano (1963–1980), Appointed Archbishop of San Juan de Cuyo
- Abelardo Francisco Silva (1981–1994), appointed Coadjutor Bishop of San Miguel
- José Lorenzo Sartori (1994–2008)
- Hugo Nicolás Barbaro (since 2008)

=== Auxiliary bishop ===
- Gustavo Alejandro Montini (2014-2016), appointed Bishop of Santo Tomé

=== Other priests of this diocese who became bishops ===
- Dante Carlos Sandrelli, appointed Auxiliary Bishop of Formosa
- Fernando Martín Croxatto, appointed Auxiliary Bishop of Comodoro Rivadavia
