= Uzita (Tunisia) =

Roman period town and bishopric in present-day Tunisia

Coordinates: 35°41′13″N 10°45′14″E

Uzita was a Roman period town and bishopric in the Roman province of Byzacena, in present-day Tunisia. It continues to be a Latin Catholic titular see.

== Location ==
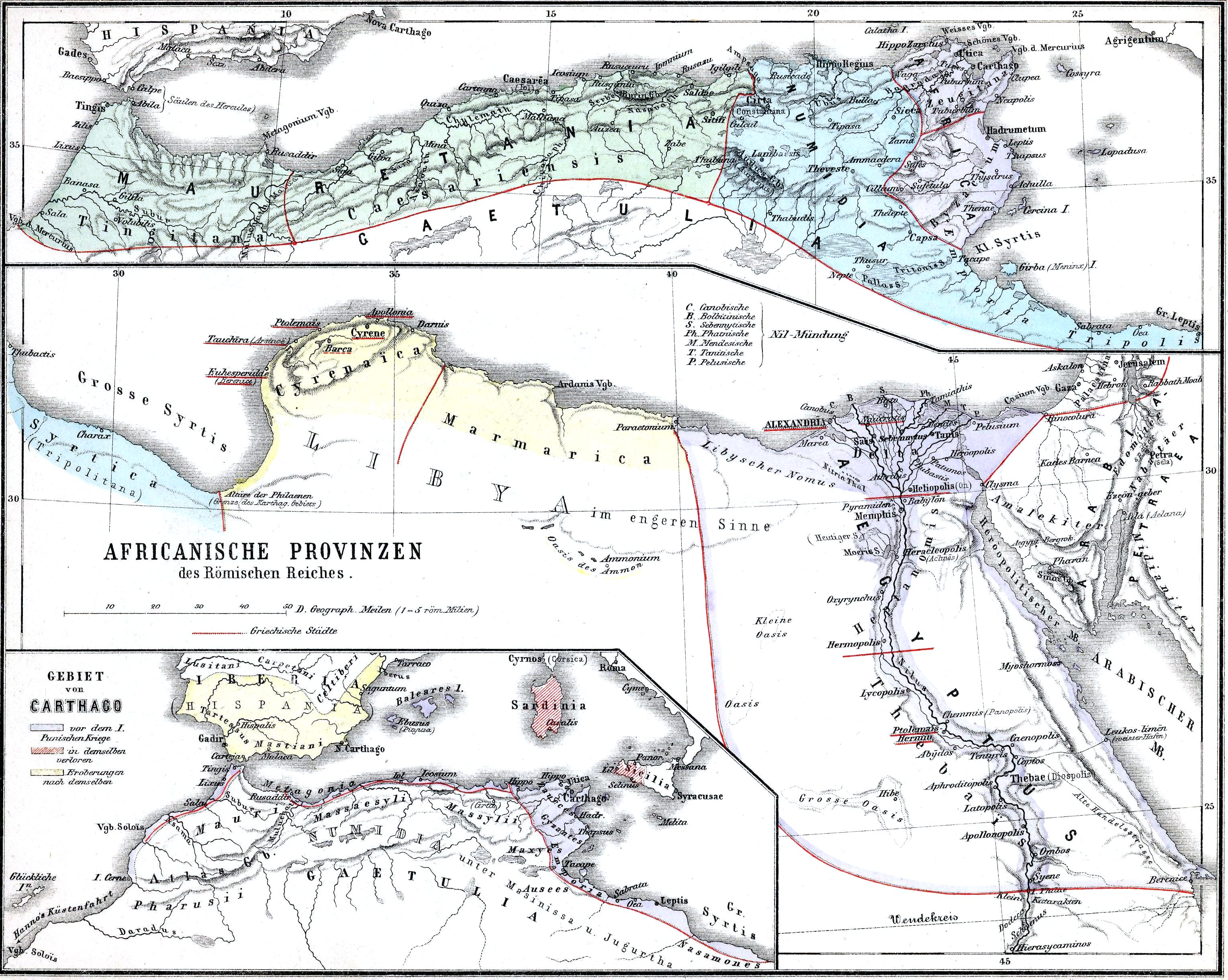
Roman North Africa.

Uzita was on the site of modern Henchir Makrceba in the central Tunisian coastal region near the Sidi El Hani and Sahline salt lakes. The site is located on a long and narrow plateau along the Oued Melah, which flows in a northeasterly direction towards the Monastir coastal wetlands, a distance of approximately six kilometers.

== History ==
Uzita was important enough in the Roman province of Byzacena to become a suffragan bishopric of its capital's Metropolitan of Hadrumetum (modern Sousse). It later faded in importance.

=== Uzita in ancient literature ===
The primary literary source on Roman period Uzita is De Bello Africo, 'On the African War', ascribed to Julius Caesar. The town is mentioned several times (Bell. Afr. 41, 51, 53, 56, 58, 59 and 67) in a narrative of Caesar's military campaigns (c. 47–46 BC) in the Tunisian Sahel region around Hadrumetum (now Sousse) and Thapsus.

=== Titular see ===
The diocese was nominally restored in 1929 as a Latin Catholic titular bishopric.

It has had the following incumbents, all of the lowest (episcopal) rank :

- Candido Domenico Moro, Friars Minor (O.F.M.) (1931.07.14–1952.10.01)
- Othon Motta (1953.03.10–1960.05.16)
- Joseph Raymond Windle (1960.11.15–1971.02.08)
- Rómulo García (1975.08.09–1976.01.19), served also as Auxiliary Bishop of Mar del Plata (Argentina) (1975.08.09 – 1976.01.19), later succeeding as Bishop of Mar del Plata (1976.01.19 – 1991.05.31), finally Metropolitan Archbishop of Bahía Blanca (Argentina) (1991.05.31–2002.06.15)
- Maximilian Goffart (1977.12.02–1980.07.17)
- Wolfgang Weider (1982.02.10 – 2024.02.14), Auxiliary Bishop emeritus of Berlin archdiocese (Germany)

== Archaeological research at Uzita ==
Although the site was recognized as ancient Roman by the end of the nineteenth century, it was not until the 1950s that it was investigated and excavated. At the time several mosaics were recovered. Large-scale investigation took place in 1961 when an area of 120 x 50 meters was excavated by a Franco-Tunisian team of researchers. Archaeological investigations by the University of Utrecht between 1970 and 1972 were limited to the same area. They have shown that the visible remains are of Roman date, but that occupation of the site goes back to the earlier period of Phoenician expansion into the region.

Two burial sites are on the north and west slope of the plateau; these have been completely plundered through the years. The remaining features include paved streets, a private and public bathhouse, parts of a defensive wall, and three peristyle houses. Civic monumental architecture has not been found in Uzita. Further structural ruins were encountered in the surrounding landscape, such as the remains of kilns and irrigation structures.

Existing literature deals primarily with the mosaic repertoire from Uzita, as well as the material assemblage excavated during the 1970–72 campaigns. Work on the architectural remains has been undertaken in the early 21st century by Mata but this remains unpublished.

== Bibliography ==
- Mata, K. 2000: Uzita of Byzacena 80–180 AD: a Rural settlement and its domestic architecture. MA thesis Vrije Universiteit Amsterdam. Amsterdam.
- Mata, K. 2009: Discrepant Experience in the Roman World: Social Distinction and the Domestic Sphere. MA thesis University of Chicago. Chicago.
- Salomonson, J. W. 1964: Romeinse Mozaiken uit Tunesië. Leiden.
- Vin, J. P. A. van der 1971: "Nederland graaft in Tunesië: Uzita 1970", in Hermeneus 42. Den Haag.
- Vin, J. P. A. van der 1971–72: "Muntvondst Uzita", in Jaarboek van Munt en Penningkunde 58–59. Leiden.
- Werff, J. H. van der 1977–78: "Amphores de tradition punique a Uzita", in Bulletin Antieke Beschavingen 52–53. Den Haag.
- Werff, J. H. van der 1982: Uzita: Vondstenmateriaal uit een antieke nederzetting in midden Tunesie. Utrecht.

== Sources and external links ==
- Roman Uzita
- GigaClassics, with titular incumbent biography links
- Caesar's 'African Wars, Internet Classics Archive
