= Diocese of Neuquén =

Catholic ecclesiastical territory

Diocese of Neuquén Dioecesis Neuquenianus Diócesis de Neuquén

Catholic
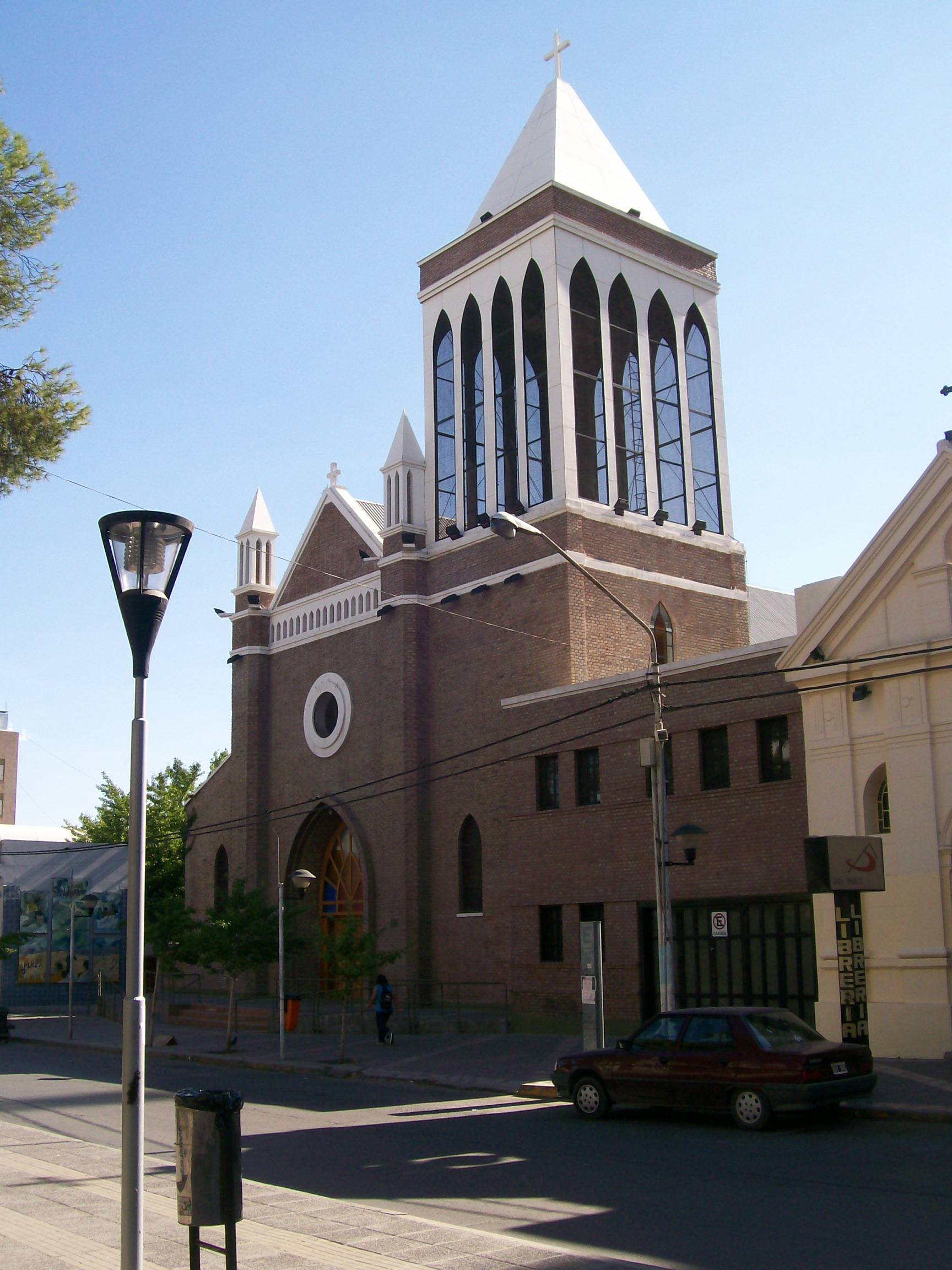
- Cathedral of Mary Help of Christians

Location
- Country: Argentina
- Ecclesiastical province: Mendoza
- Metropolitan: Mendoza

Statistics
- Area: 94,078 km^{2} (36,324 sq mi)
- Population: Total; Catholics: (as of 2004); 494,358; 435,035 (88%)
- Parishes: 53

Information
- Denomination: Roman Catholic
- Rite: Roman Rite
- Established: 10 April 1961 (65 years ago)
- Cathedral: Cathedral of Our Lady Help of Christians in Neuquén
- Patron saint: St Francis de Sales; Mary Help of Christians

Current leadership
- Pope: Leo XIV
- Bishop: Fernando Croxatto
- Metropolitan Archbishop: Marcelo Daniel Colombo

The Roman Catholic Diocese of Neuquén (Latin: Dioecesis Neuquenianus) covers Neuquén Province, in Argentina. It is a suffragan see to the Archdiocese of Mendoza.

== History ==
On 10 April 1961, Blessed John XXIII established the Diocese of Neuquén from the Diocese of Viedma.

== Bishops ==
=== Ordinaries ===
- Jaime Francisco de Nevares (1961–1991)
- Agustín Roberto Radrizzani, S.D.B. (1991–2001), appointed Bishop of Lomas de Zamora
- Marcelo Angiolo Melani, S.D.B. (2002–2011)
- Virginio Domingo Bressanelli, S.C.I. (2011–2017)
- Fernando Croxatto (2017–present)

=== Coadjutor bishop ===
- Virginio Domingo Bressanelli, S.C.I. (2010–2011)
