= Raúl Marcelo Pacífico Scozzina =

Roman Catholic prelate

Raúl Marcelo Pacífico Scozzina, O.F.M
- Bishop Emeritus of Formosa
- Church: Roman Catholic Church
- See: Diocese of Formosa
- In office: 1957–1978
- Predecessor: none
- Successor: Dante Carlos Sandrelli

Orders
- Ordination: December 23, 1944

Personal details
- Born: August 14, 1921 San Martín Norte, Argentina
- Died: June 11, 2011 (aged 89)

Raúl Marcelo Pacífico Scozzina (August 14, 1921 – June 11, 2011) was an Argentine prelate of the Roman Catholic Church.

Raúl Marcelo Pacífico Scozzina was born in San Martín Norte, Argentina and was ordained a priest on December 23, 1944 from the religious order Order of Friars Minor. Scozzina was appointed bishop of the Diocese of Formosa on May 7, 1957 and ordained a bishop on July 21, 1957. Scozzina resigned from the Diocese of Formosa on March 31, 1978.

== See also ==
- Order of Friars Minor
- Diocese of Formosa
