= Resistencia Cathedral =

Catholic cathedral in Resistencia, Argentina

St. Ferdinand the King Cathedral
- Catedral de San Fernando Rey de Resistencia
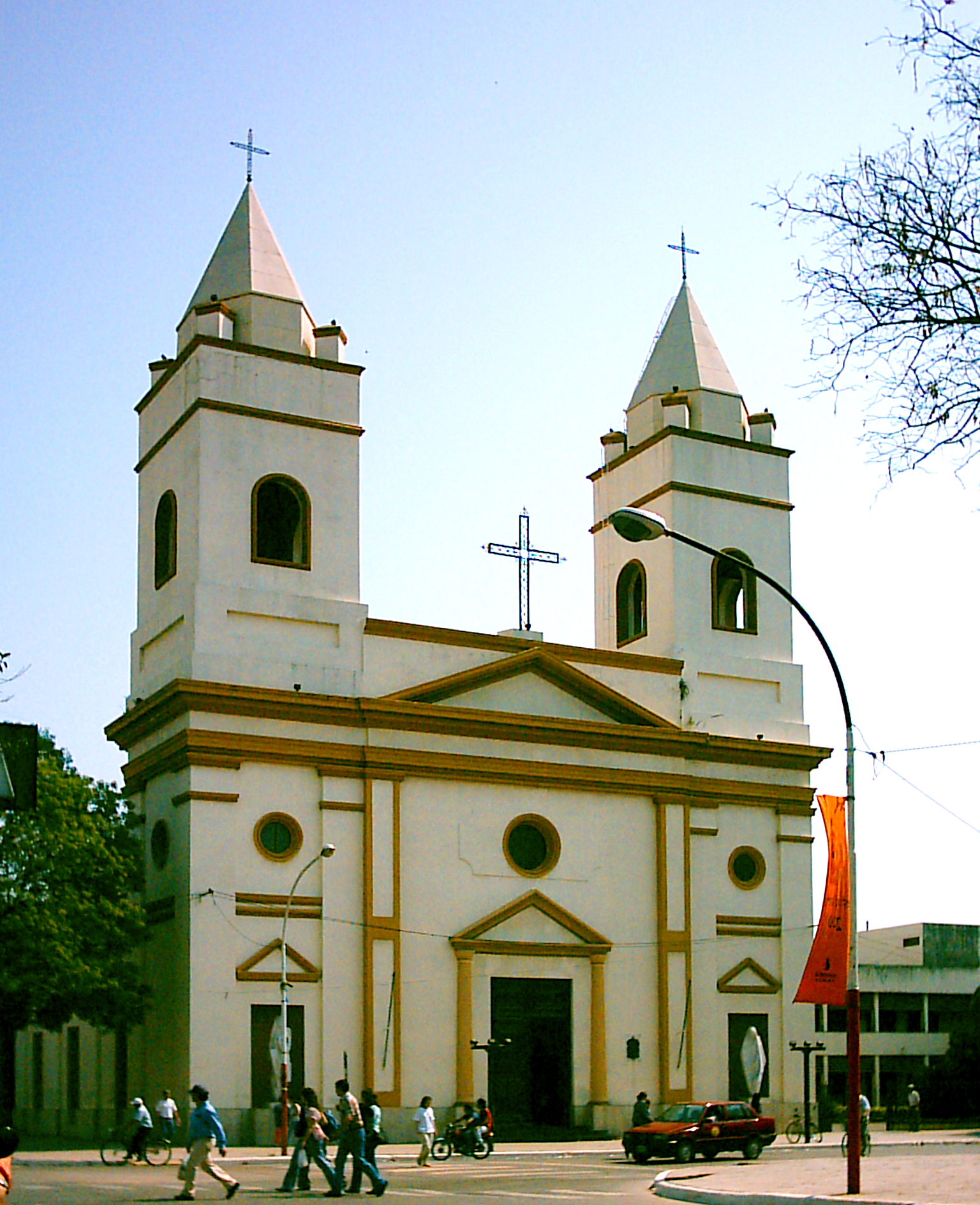
- St. Ferdinand the King Cathedral
- 27.4509°S 58.9882°W
- Location: Resistencia
- Country: Argentina
- Denomination: Roman Catholic Church

The St. Ferdinand the King Cathedral (Spanish: Catedral de San Fernando Rey de Resistencia), also called Resistencia Cathedral is a Roman Catholic cathedral in Resistencia, Argentina. It is the seat of the Archdiocese of Resistencia, and the head of an ecclesiastical province which covers the Argentine provinces of Chaco and Formosa. It was built in the 1930s.

On July 3, 1939, Pope Pius XII divided the diocese of Santa Fe to create the diocese of Resistance, which Pope John Paul II elevated to the rank of archdiocese on April 1, 1984.

On May 5, 1999, the Executive Branch of the province of Chaco declared the cathedral as part of the "cultural heritage of the province".

In late 2008, the cathedral began deep internal and external renovations that had a completion date for Easter Sunday 2009.

== See also ==
- Roman Catholicism in Argentina
- Ferdinand III of Castile

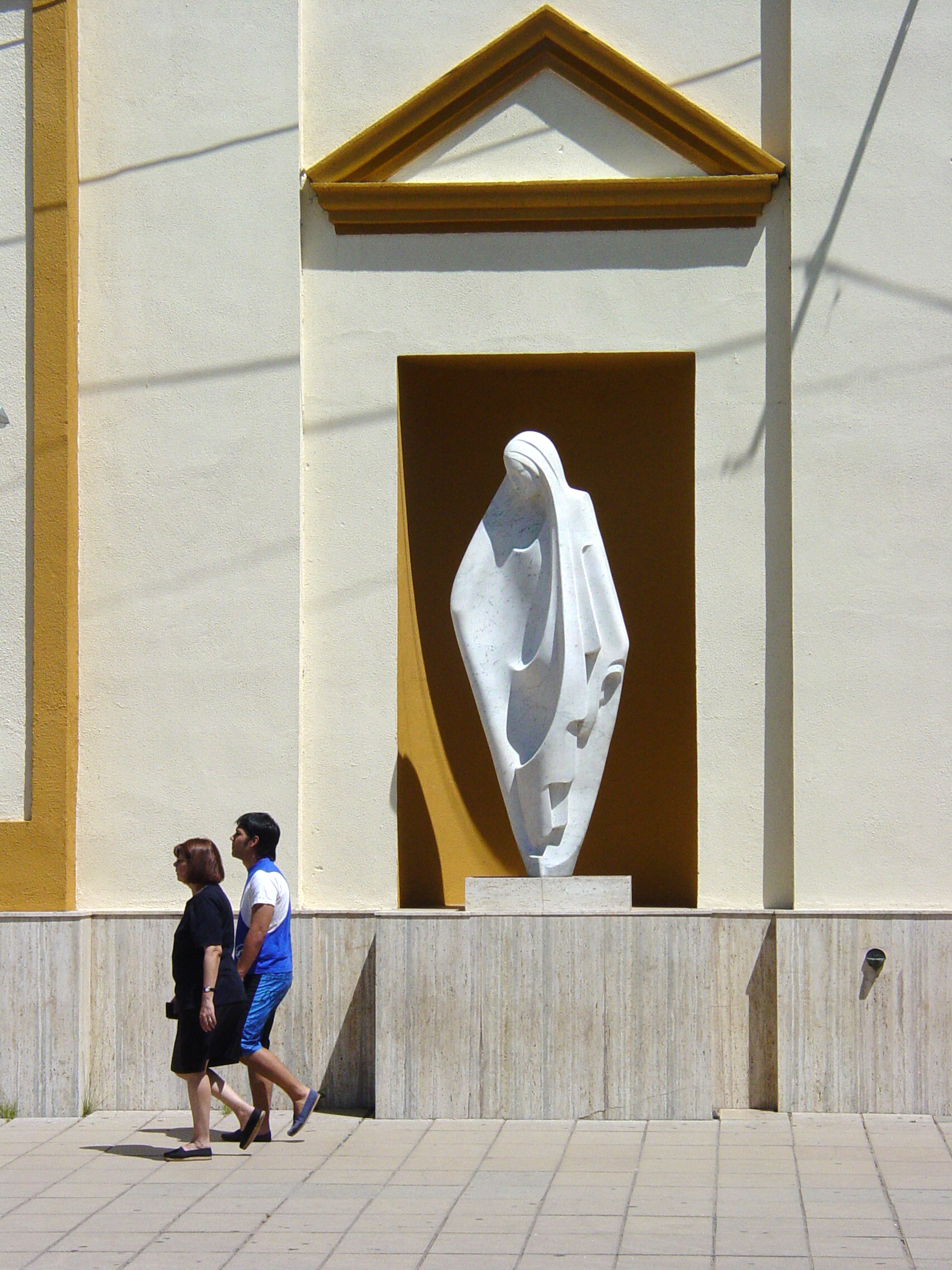
Sculpture of the Virgin Mary
