= Roman Catholic Diocese of Comodoro Rivadavia =

Catholic ecclesiastical territory

Coordinates: 45.8623°S 67.4853°W

Diocese of Comodoro Rivadavia Dioecesis Rivi Nigri Vallensis Superioris Diócesis de Comodoro Rivadavia

Catholic
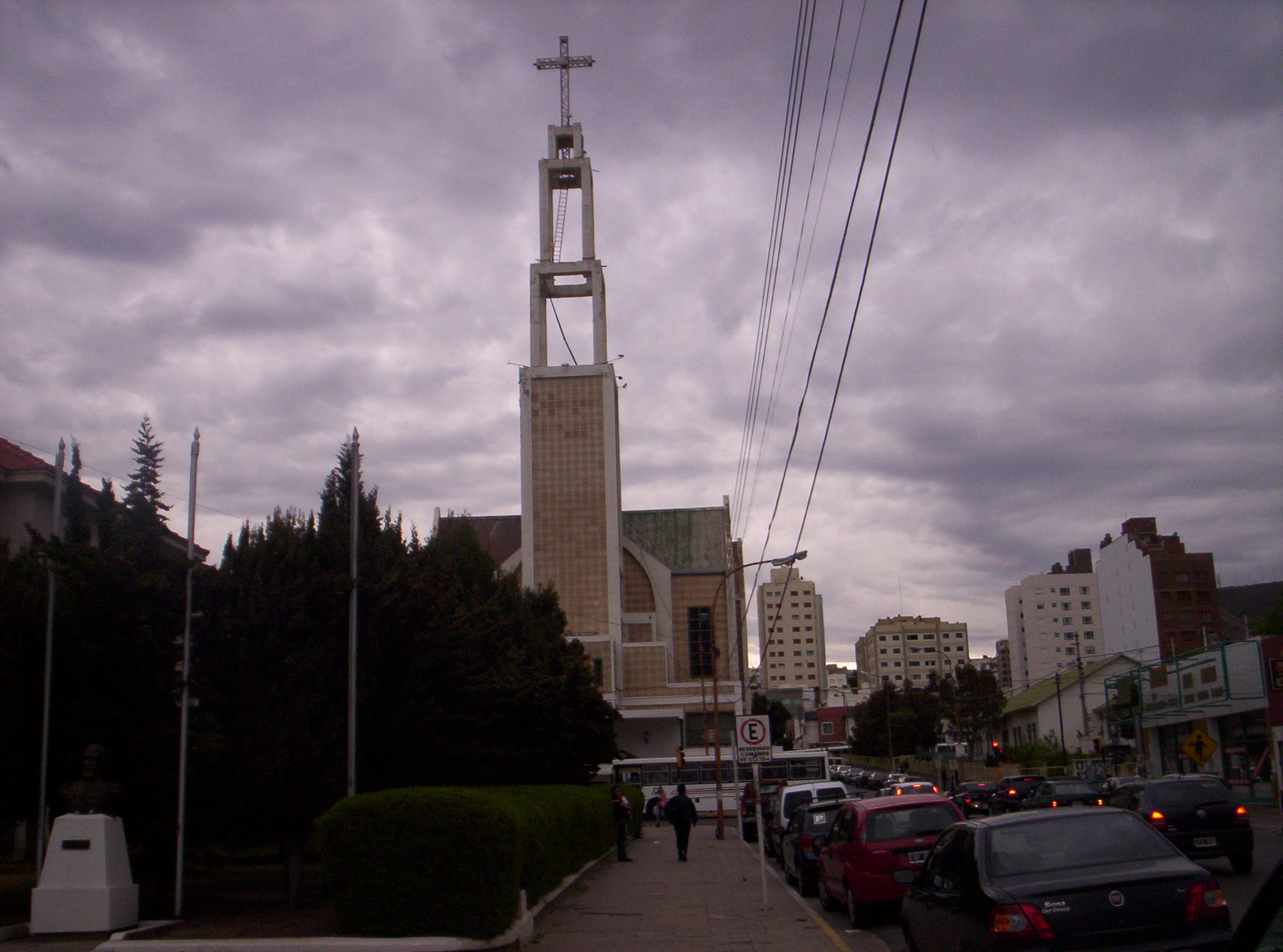
- Cathedral of St. John Bosco

Location
- Country: Argentina
- Ecclesiastical province: Bahía Blanca
- Metropolitan: Bahía Blanca

Statistics
- Area: 234,000 km^{2} (90,000 sq mi)
- Population: Total; Catholics: (as of 2006); 422,000; 353,000 (83.6%)
- Parishes: 33

Information
- Denomination: Catholic Church
- Rite: Roman Rite
- Established: 11 February 1957 (69 years ago)
- Cathedral: Cathedral of St John Bosco in Comodoro Rivadavia
- Patron saint: St John Bosco

Current leadership
- Pope: Leo XIV
- Bishop: Jorge Luis Wagner
- Metropolitan Archbishop: Carlos Alfonso Azpiroz Costa
- Apostolic Administrator: Roberto Pío Álvarez

The Roman Catholic Diocese of Comodoro is located in the city of Comodoro, in the Patagonian province of Chubut in southern Argentina.

== Diocese ==
The Roman Catholic Diocese of Comodoro Rivadavia encompasses 234,000 km^{2} (90,382 square miles) of central Patagonia covering the Province of Chubut. The Diocese was founded in 1957 from part of the Diocese of Viedma. In 1961, its southern half became the separate Diocese of Río Gallegos. In 2009, part of the diocese became the Territorial Prelature of Esquel. It is a suffragan see to the Archdiocese of Bahía Blanca.

The Cathedral is located in the city of Comodoro Rivadavia. It is dedicated to San Juan Bosco, the only cathedral in the world dedicated to the founder of the Salesian Order. It was inaugurated in 1979, although the crypt had been dedicated in 1949.

In 2024 the Apostolic Administrator, bishop Roberto Álvarez, described the religious landscape of Patagonia as mission territory. "The Patagonian Church is special, and very different from the rest of Argentina. For example, we are a land of evangelisation, a mission country. This region does not have deep Christian roots".

== Bishops ==
=== Ordinaries ===
The Roman Catholic Bishop of Comodoro Rivadavia is a prelate bishop of the Roman Catholic Church in Argentina.

- Carlos Mariano Pérez Eslava S.D.B.(13 March 1957 – 26 December 1963), appointed Archbishop of Salta
- Eugenio Santiago Peyrou S.D.B. (24 June 1964 – 19 February 1974), resigned
- Argimiro Daniel Moure Piñeiro S.D.B. (5 April 1975 – 8 September 1992)
- Pedro Luis Ronchino S.D.B. (30 January 1993 – 19 February 2005), retired
- Virginio Domingo Bressanelli S.C.I. (19 February 2005 – 10 February 2010), appointed Coadjutor Bishop of Neuquén
- Joaquín Gimeno Lahoz (15 July 2010 – 19 October 2023), retired
- Jorge Luis Wagner (22 February 2024 – Present)

=== Auxiliary bishops ===
- Mario Picchi, S.D.B. (1970-1975), appointed Auxiliary Bishop of La Plata
- Fernando Martín Croxatto (2014-2017), appointed Bishop of Neuquén
- Alejandro Pablo Benna (2017-2021), appointed Bishop of Alto Valle del Río Negro
- Roberto Pío Álvarez (2017-2023), appointed Administrator of the diocese

=== Apostolic Administrators ===
- Roberto Pío Álvarez (2023-2024)

== See also ==
- Catholic Church in Argentina
