= San Fernando del Valle de Catamarca Cathedral =

Roman Catholic cathedral in Catamarca, Argentina

Coordinates: 28.468944°S 65.780094°W

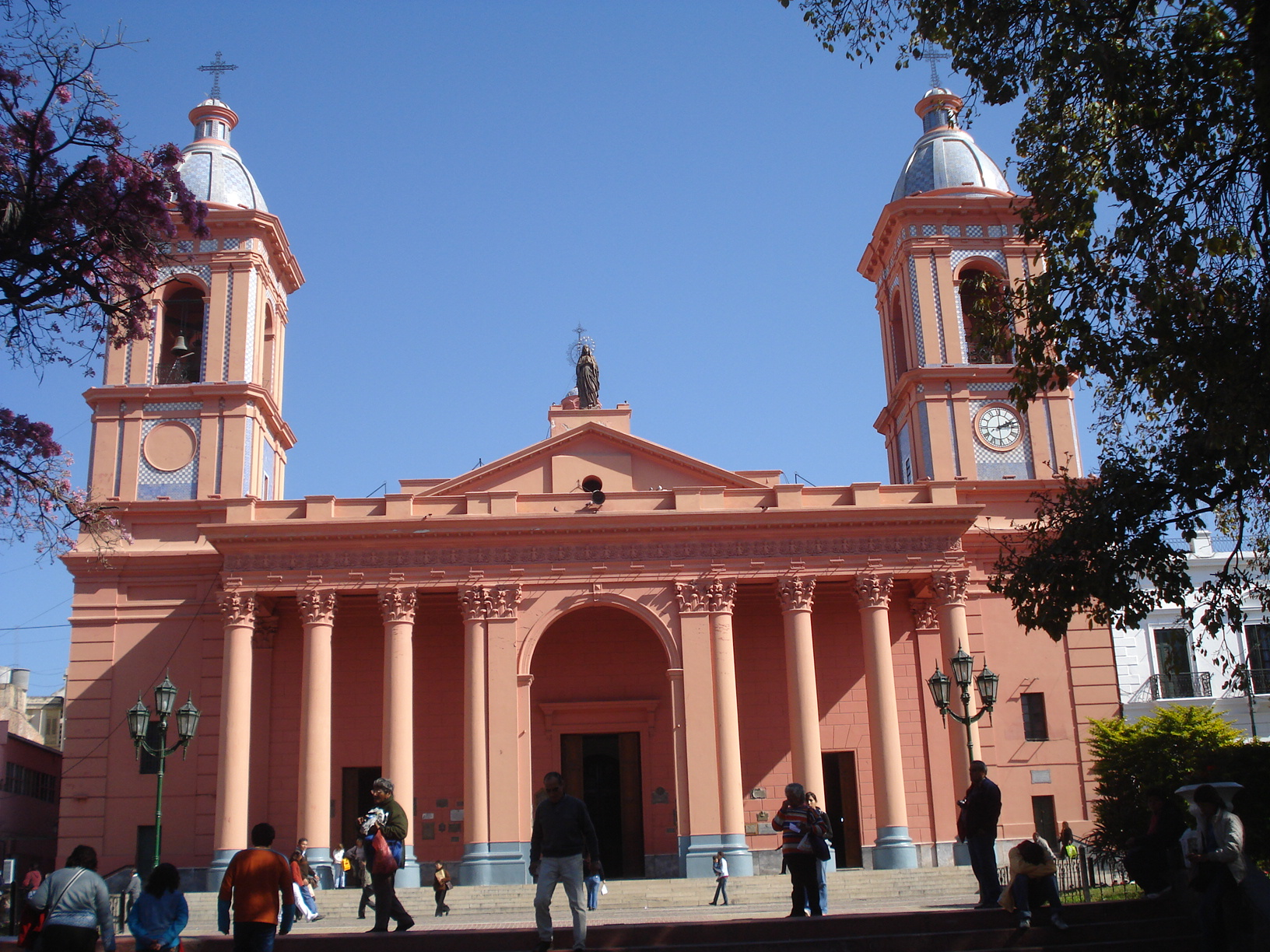
Catedral Basílica de Nuestra Señora del Valle

Catedral Basílica de Nuestra Señora del Valle is a basilica cathedral in San Fernando del Valle de Catamarca, Catamarca Province, Argentina. It is dedicated to the Virgen del Valle.

== Description ==
The church has a nave and two side chapels. The nave is 58.5 metres (192 ft) long, 9.65 metres (31.7 ft) wide and 14.65 metres (48.1 ft) high. The floors are of marble mosaic with geometric decorations. The main altar is made of white Carrara marble. The facade is framed by two towers at its lateral ends. The dome peaks at 42 metres (138 ft) in height.
