= Diocese of Formosa, Argentina =

Catholic ecclesiastical territory

Coordinates: 26.1834°S 58.1677°W

Diocese of Formosa Dioecesis Formosae Diócesis de Formosa

Catholic
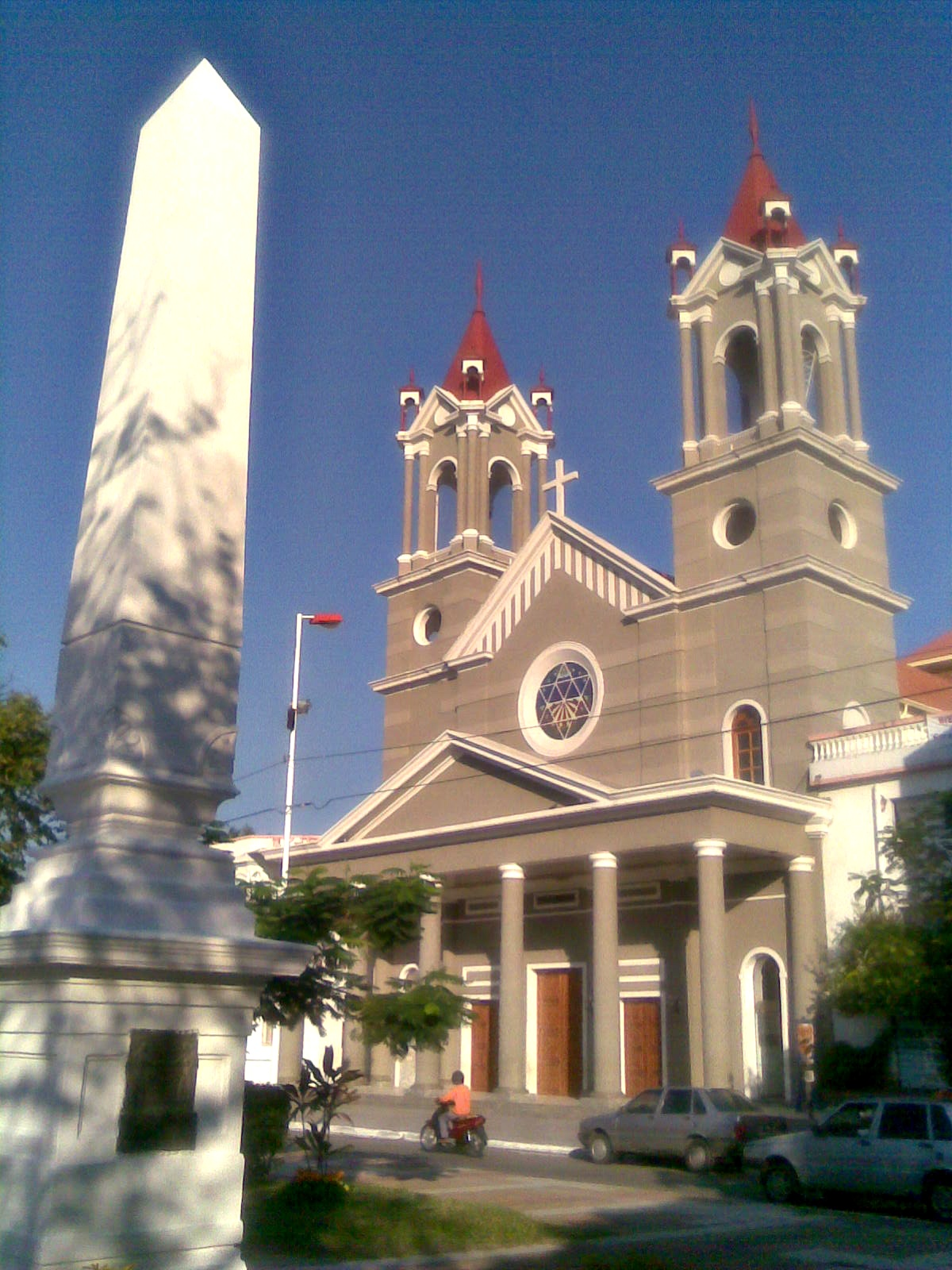
- Cathedral of Formosa

Location
- Country: Argentina
- Ecclesiastical province: Resistencia
- Metropolitan: Resistencia

Statistics
- Area: 72,066 km^{2} (27,825 sq mi)
- Population: Total; Catholics: (as of 2006); 566,000; 480,000 (84.8%)
- Parishes: 27

Information
- Denomination: Roman Catholic
- Rite: Roman Rite
- Established: 11 February 1957 (69 years ago)
- Cathedral: Cathedral of Our Lady of Carmel in Formosa
- Patron saint: Our Lady of Mount Carmel

Current leadership
- Pope: Leo XIV
- Bishop: José Vicente Conejero Gallego
- Metropolitan Archbishop: Fabriciano Sigampa

The Roman Catholic Diocese of Formosa 'Dioecesis Formosae' (erected 11 February 1957) is in Argentina and is a suffragan of the Archdiocese of Resistencia.

== Bishops ==
=== Ordinaries ===
- Raúl Marcelo Pacífico Scozzina, O.F.M. (1957–1978)
- Dante Carlos Sandrelli (1978–1998)
- José Vicente Conejero Gallego (1998– )

=== Coadjutor bishop ===
- José Vicente Conejero Gallego (1996–1998)

=== Other priest of this diocese who became bishop ===
- Adolfo Ramón Canecín, appointed Coadjutor Bishop of Goya in 2014

== External links and references ==
- "Diocese of Formosa". Catholic-Hierarchy.^{[self-published]}
