= Archdiocese of Bahía Blanca =

Latin Catholic territory in Argentina

Archdiocese of Bahía Blanca Archidioecesis Sinus Albi Arquidiócesis de Bahía Blanca

Catholic
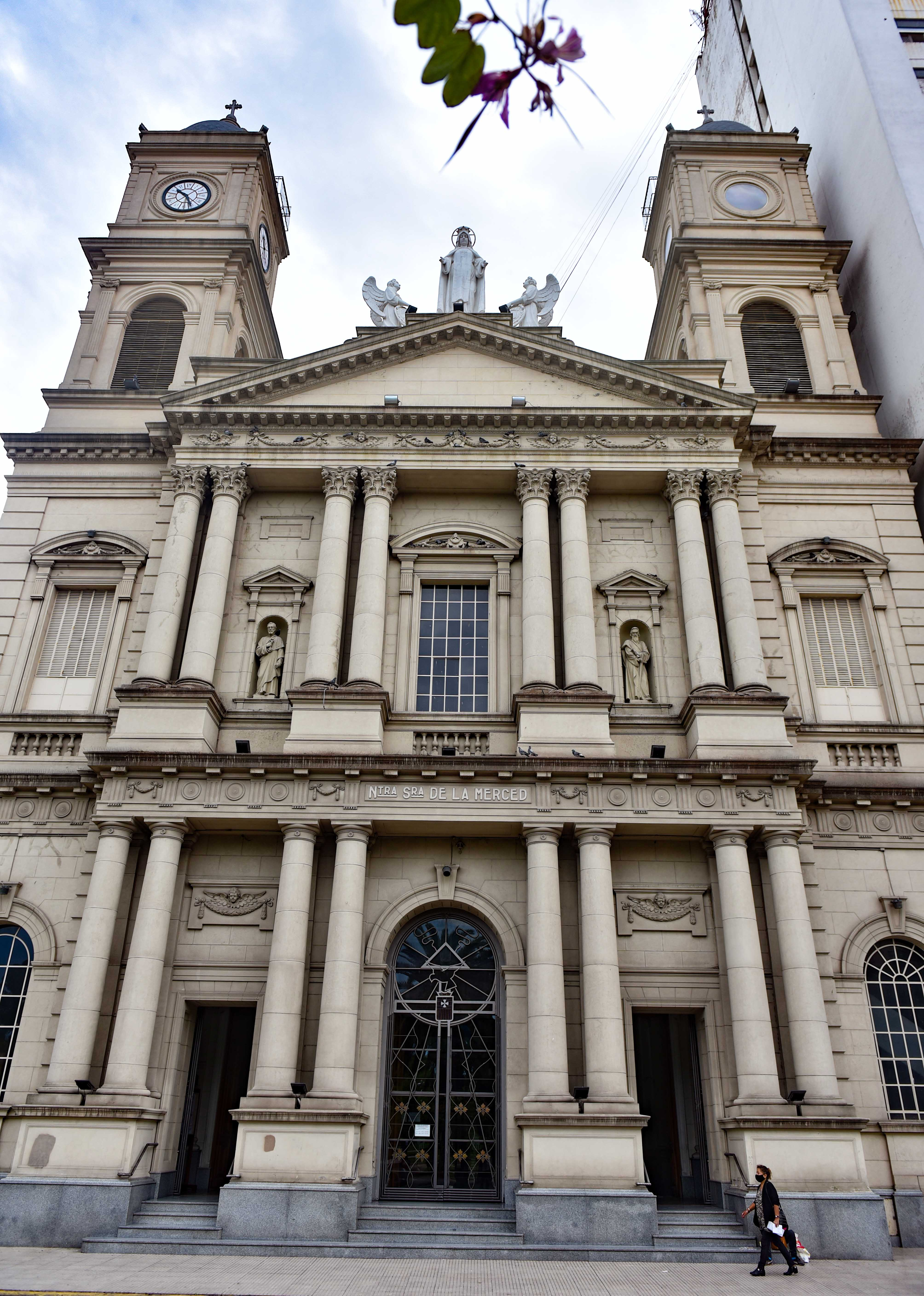
- Cathedral of Our Lady of Mercy

Location
- Country: Argentina
- Ecclesiastical province: Bahía Blanca

Statistics
- Area: 82,634 sq mi (214,020 km^{2})
- Population: Total; Catholics: (as of 2012); 743,000; 635,000 (85.5%)
- Parishes: 56

Information
- Denomination: Catholic Church
- Sui iuris church: Latin Church
- Rite: Roman Rite
- Established: 20 April 1934 (92 years ago)
- Cathedral: Our Lady of Mercy Cathedral in Bahía Blanca
- Patron saint: Virgin of Mercy

Current leadership
- Pope: Leo XIV
- Archbishop: Carlos Azpiroz Costa, OP

Map
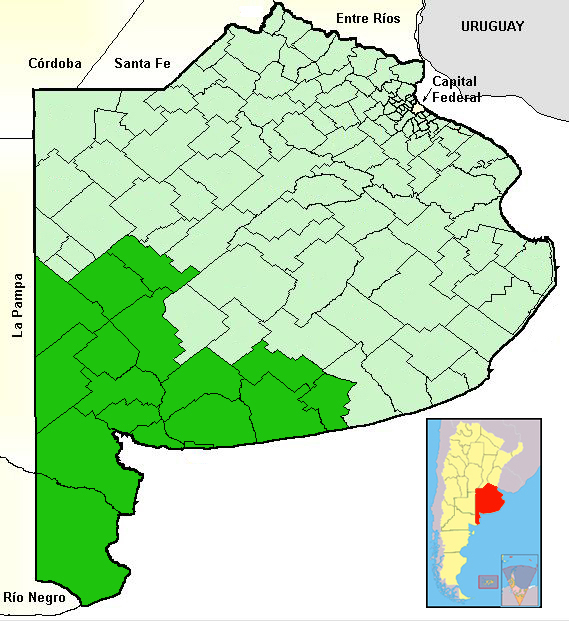

Website
- arzobispadobahia.org.ar

The Archdiocese of Bahía Blanca (Archidioecesis Sinus Albi) is a Latin Church metropolitan archdiocese of the Catholic Church with an ecclesiastical province in the eastern region of the national capital's province of Buenos Aires, central Argentina.

Its cathedral archiepiscopal see and mother church, located in the city of Bahía Blanca, is the Cathedral of Our Lady of Mercy. Since 12 July 2017 Carlos Azpiroz Costa has been its Archbishop.

== Extent and statistics ==
As per 2015, the Archdiocese pastorally served 661,096 Catholics (83.3% of 793,517 total) on 82,624 km² in 55 parishes and 236 missions with 71 priests (45 diocesan, 26 religious), 27 deacons, 211 lay religious (44 brothers, 167 sisters) and 15 seminarians.

It covers the partidos (municipalities) of Adolfo Alsina, Adolfo González Chávez, Bahía Blanca, Coronel Dorrego, Coronel de Marina Leonardo Rosales, Coronel Pringles, Coronel Suárez, Daireaux, Guaminí, Monte Hermoso, Patagones, Puán, Saavedra, San Cayetano, Tornquist, Tres Arroyos and Villarino.

== Ecclesiastical province of Bahía Blanca ==
The Metropolitan Archdiocese has suffragan sees encompassing all of the administrative Provinces of Patagonia and Tierra del Fuego, notably :

- Roman Catholic Diocese of Alto Valle del Río Negro
- Roman Catholic Diocese of Comodoro Rivadavia
- Roman Catholic Diocese of Rawson
- Roman Catholic Diocese of Río Gallegos
- Roman Catholic Diocese of San Carlos de Bariloche
- Roman Catholic Diocese of Santa Rosa, Argentina, its daughter
- Roman Catholic Diocese of Viedma
- (pre-diocesan) Territorial Prelature of Esquel.

== History ==
- It was erected as Diocese of Bahía Blanca / Sinus Albi (Latin) on 20 April 1934 by Pope Pius XI's bull Nobilis Argentinae nationis, on territory split off from the Archdiocese of La Plata. Its first bishop was Leandro Bautista Astelarra (1934–1943).
- It was elevated as Metropolitan Archdiocese of Bahía Blanca / Sinus Albi (Latin) on 11 February 1957 by Pope Pius XII's bull Quandoquidem adoranda, having lost territories to establish Diocese of Mar del Plata and (as its suffragan) Diocese of Santa Rosa.
- It enjoyed a Papal visit from Pope John Paul II in April 1987.

== Bishops ==
=== Episcopal Ordinaries ===
Suffragan Bishops of Bahía Blanca

- Leandro Bautista Astelarra (13 September 1934 – death 24 August 1943)
- Germiniano Esorto (2 November 1946 – 31 May 1972 see below), previously Titular Bishop of Birtha (1943.08.23 – 1946.11.02) as Auxiliary Bishop of La Plata (Argentina) (1943.08.23 – 1946.11.02)

Metropolitan Archbishops of Bahía Blanca

- Germiniano Esorto (see above 2 November 1946 – retired 31 May 1972)
- Jorge Mayer (31 May 1972 – retired 31 May 1991) died 2010: previously Bishop of Santa Rosa (Argentina) (1957.03.13 – 1972.05.31)
  - Auxiliary Bishop: Emilio Ogñénovich (1979.10.01 – 1982.06.08), Titular Bishop of Mibiarca (1979.10.01 – 1982.06.08), later 'last' Suffragan Bishop of Mercedes (Argentina) (1982.06.08 – 1989.05.10), (see) restyled Bishop of Mercedes–Luján (1989.05.10 – 1997.11.21), (see) promoted first Archbishop of Mercedes–Luján (1997.11.21 – retired 2000.03.07), died 2012
  - Auxiliary Bishop: José Vittorio Tommasí (1984.11.19 – 1991.08.28), Titular Bishop of Equizetum (1984.11.19 – 1991.08.28); later Bishop of Nueve de Julio (Argentina) (1991.08.28 – death 1998.09.16)
- Rómulo García (31 May 1991 – retired 15 June 2002), died 2005; previously Titular Bishop of Uzita (1975.08.09 – 1976.01.19) as Auxiliary Bishop of Diocese of Mar del Plata (Argentina) (1975.08.09 – 1976.01.19), succeeding as Bishop of Mar del Plata (1976.01.19 – 1991.05.31)
  - Auxiliary Bishop: Néstor Hugo Navarro (1998.04.15 – 2003.03.19), Titular Bishop of Rotdon (1998.04.15 – 2003.03.19); next Bishop of Alto Valle del Río Negro (Argentina) (2003.03.19 – retired 2010.02.10)
- Guillermo José Garlatti (11 March 2003 – retired 12 July 2017); previously Titular Bishop of Aquæ regiæ (1994.08.27 – 1997.02.20) as Auxiliary Bishop of Archdiocese of La Plata (Argentina) (1994.08.27 – 1997.02.20), Bishop of San Rafael (Argentina) (1997.02.20 – 2003.03.11)
  - Auxiliary Bishop: Pedro María Laxague (2006.11.14 – 2015.11.03), Titular Bishop of Castra Severiana (2006.11.14 – 2015.11.03); next Bishop of Zárate–Campana (Argentina) (2015.11.03 – ...)
- Carlos Alfonso Azpiroz Costa, Dominican Order (O.P.) (12 July 2017 – ...), previously Master (General Superior) of the Order of Preachers (O.P., Dominicans) (2001.07.14 – 2010.09.05), Grand Chancellor of Pontifical University of St. Thomas Aquinas (Angelicum) (2001.07.14 – 2010.09.05), Coadjutor Archbishop of Bahía Blanca (2015.11.03 – succession 2017.07.12).

=== Coadjutor archbishop ===
- Carlos Alfonso Azpiroz Costa, O.P. (2015-2017)

=== Auxiliary bishops ===
- Emilio Ogñénovich (1979-1982), appointed Bishop of Mercedes
- José Vittorio Tommasí (1984-1991), appointed Bishop of Nueve de Julio
- Néstor Hugo Navarro (1998-2003), appointed Bishop of Alto Valle del Río Negro
- Pedro María Laxague (2006-2015) appointed Bishop of Zárate-Campana
- Jorge Luis Wagner (2019-)

== See also ==
- Roman Catholicism in Argentina

== Sources and external links ==
- GCathholic with Google map - data for all sections
- (in Spanish) Archdiocese of Bahía Blanca at AICA (Argentine Catholic News Agency).
- "Archdiocese of Bahía Blanca". Catholic-Hierarchy.org. David M. Cheney.
