= Sexual abuse scandal in the Roman Catholic Archdiocese of Santa Fe de la Vera Cruz =

Sexual abuse cases in Argentina

Sexual abuse in the Roman Catholic Archdiocese of Santa Fe de la Vera Cruz in Argentina is a major chapter in the series of Catholic sex abuse cases in various Western jurisdictions.

== Earlier Vatican investigation ==
In 1994, archbishop Edgardo Gabriel Storni (6 April 1936 – 20 February 2012) was subject to an investigation ordered by the Vatican, led by Monsignor José María Arancibia, after allegations of sexual abuse on 47 young seminarians, who were questioned, together with some of their family members, by Arancibia and a psychologist, at the home of Monsignor Estanislao Karlic in Paraná. Soon after the scandal broke out, in February 1995 Storni employed his contacts with then-Apostolic Nuncio Ubaldo Calabressi to arrange a trip to the Vatican. There he was received and ratified in his post by Pope John Paul II. The investigation was set aside. In 2009 an Argentine judge convicted and sentenced him to eight years.

== Book on the affairs ==
In 2002, the book Our Holy Mother, by journalist Olga Wornat, was presented at the Santa Fe Book Fair. The book recounted the history of the accusations against Storni, and mentions an episode of threats against a priest, José Guntern, who had written a letter to the archbishop asking for him to resign on account of his misconduct (sexual activity with a seminarist). According to Guntern, he was taken practically by force to Storni's house and forced to recant and stay silent.

== Political climate ==
The political climate had changed. While Storni has close relations with members of the local elite, the Catholic Church had been shaken by the wave of abuse allegations in the United States. Storni travelled to Rome on 28 August 2002 where he met the Pope and several other Argentine bishops.

== Episcopal resignation ==
Storni resigned his post on 1 October 2002 stating that this did not signify guilt. He returned to Argentina and went to live at Los Leones, a large farm and horse ranch owned by Eduardo González Kess near Llambí Campbell, 60 km away from Santa Fe's capital. He then moved to a secluded ecclesiastic residence in La Falda, Córdoba; since he was formally still a bishop, he received a pension paid by the state, as per the financial support of the Church mandated by the Argentine Constitution.

== Conviction and annulment ==
In 2009, Storni was sentenced to eight years in prison, the minimum term, for sexually abusing seminarian Rubén Descalzo in 1992. Because Storni was over the age of 70, the sentence was served under house arrest at a church property in Cordoba. In 2011, the Criminal Chamber of the Province of Santa Fe ordered the annulment of the judgement.

== Another Bishop charged ==
On July 15, 2020, it was revealed that Santa Fe Archbishop Sergio Fenoy was criminally charged for attempting to supplant another sex abuse investigation.

== See also ==
- Child sexual abuse
- Sexual abuse
