= 1975 Jubilee ordination =

Religious ritual in Vatican City

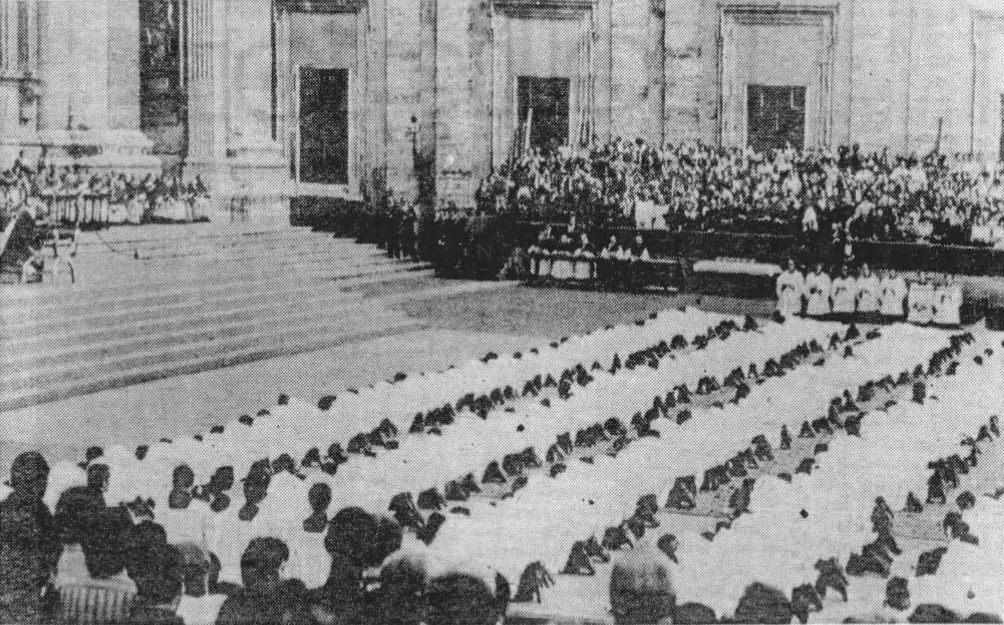
- The ordinandi lying prostrate during the ceremony
- Date: 29 June 1975
- Duration: 3 1/2 hours
- Venue: St. Peter's Square
- Location: Vatican City
- Participants: Over 350 priests ordained (Note: Some accounts report 362, others 354, still others 359.); 100,000–150,000 in attendance

External videos
- A YouTube video
- Associated Press's recording of that day

On Sunday, 29 June 1975, the Feast of Saints Peter and Paul, Pope Paul VI ordained over 350 men as Catholic priests in an open air ceremony in St. Peter's Square in what has been considered the largest ordination in history. Sixteen of the ordinands would go on to be consecrated bishops, and three of them would be elevated to the cardinalate.

== Ordination ==
In 1973, Pope Paul VI declared that 1975 would be a Jubilee Holy Year. The Central Committee for the Holy Year announced the ordination would be a part of the celebration. Those to be ordained came primarily from seminaries in Rome, though some ordinands traveled to Rome. While there had been questions about what participation levels in the Holy Year would be like due to societal changes, by the ordination over 3 million pilgrims had been to Rome, twice the number as 1950.

The ordination took place on 29 June 1975, the Feast of Saints Peter and Paul and the eve of the 12th anniversary of the coronation of Pope Paul VI. Twenty bishops concelebrated the Mass. In his sermon, the pope called the ordinands to be "the salt of the earth and a light to the world", and urged them to be close to the poor. Over 350 men were ordained from 50 different nations, and an estimated 100,000–150,000 people attended. Thirty-five ordinandi were from North America, thirty-four were from Africa, thirty-six were from Asia, fourteen from Latin America, three from Oceania, and 226 were from Europe. The Associated Press reported the lengthy 3 1/2 hour ceremony as the largest ordination in history.

The crash of Eastern Air Lines Flight 66 killed the father, stepmother, and an uncle and aunt of Deacon Millard Boyer, who was to be ordained for the Diocese of Lafayette in Louisiana. They were on their way to the ordination. The pontiff expressed his sorrow about the incident during the homily. Boyer's ordination was delayed, as he returned to the United States to identify the bodies.

== Notable ordinands ==
- Cardinal Raymond Leo Burke — Archbishop of Saint Louis (2004–2008), Prefect of the Apostolic Signatura (2008–2014)
- Bishop Michael Richard Cote — Bishop of Norwich (2003–2024)
- Bishop Luis Alberto Fernández Alara — Bishop of Rafaela (2013–present)
- Bishop Gustavo García Naranjo — Bishop of Guarenas (1997–2020)
- Cardinal James Michael Harvey — Prefect of the Prefecture of the Papal Household (1998–2012), archpriest of the Basilica of Saint Paul Outside the Walls (2012–present)
- Bishop Michael Joseph Hoeppner — Bishop of Crookston (2007–2021)
- Bishop Jacinto Jose — Bishop of Urdaneta (2005–present)
- Bishop Leo Laba Ladjar — Bishop of Jayapura (1997–2002)
- Bishop Luigi Mansi — Bishop of Andria (2015–present)
- Archbishop J. Michael Miller — Secretary of the Congregation for Catholic Education (2003–2007), Archbishop of Vancouver (2009–2025)
- Bishop Michael Mulvey — Bishop of Corpus Christi (2010–2025)
- Bishop Glen Provost — Bishop of Lake Charles (2007–present)
- Cardinal Malcolm Ranjith — Secretary of the Congregation for Divine Worship and the Discipline of the Sacraments (2005–2009), Archbishop of Columbo (2009–present)
- Bishop Joseph Prathan Sridarunsil — Bishop of Surat Thani (2004–2024)
- Bishop José Raúl Vera López — Bishop of Saltillo (2000–2020)
- Bishop Patrick Zurek — Bishop of Amarillo (2008–2026)
