= Luis Alberto Fernández Alara =

- Bishop Emeritus of Rafaela
- Church: Catholic Church
- Diocese: Diocese of Rafaela
- In office: 10 September 2013 – 11 November 2022
- Predecessor: Carlos María Franzini
- Successor: Pedro Javier Torres
- Previous posts: Titular Bishop of Carpi (2009-2013); Auxiliary Bishop of Buenos Aires (2009-2013)

Orders
- Ordination: 29 June 1975 by Pope Paul VI
- Consecration: 27 March 2009 by Jorge Mario Bergoglio

Personal details
- Born: 26 October 1946 (age 79) Lomas de Zamora, Buenos Aires Province, Argentina

Luis Alberto Fernández Alara (born October 26, 1946) is a prelate of the Roman Catholic Church. He served as auxiliary bishop of Buenos Aires from 2009 until 2013, when he became bishop of Rafaela.

== Life ==
Born in Lomas de Zamora, Fernández Alara was ordained to the priesthood on June 29, 1975 by Pope Paul VI.

On January 24, 2009, he was appointed auxiliary bishop of Buenos Aires and titular bishop of Carpi. Fernández Alara received his episcopal consecration on the following March 27 from Jorge Mario Bergoglio, archbishop of Buenos Aires, the later pope Francis, with archbishop of Mercedes-Luján, Agustín Roberto Radrizzani, bishop of Lomas de Zamora, Jorge Rubén Lugones, and archbishop of Santa Fe de la Vera Cruz, José María Arancedo, serving as co-consecrators.

He was appointed bishop of Rafaela on September 10, 2013.
