= Diocese of Concordia =

(Roman Catholic) Diocese of Concordia may refer to the following Latin Catholic jurisdictions :

- the current Roman Catholic Diocese of Concordia in Argentina, Argentina
- the former Roman Catholic Diocese of Concordia (Italy), now Roman Catholic Diocese of Concordia-Pordenone
- the former Roman Catholic Diocese of Concordia in Kansas, now Roman Catholic Diocese of Salina, in Kansas, USA
