= Héctor Sabatino Cardelli =

Argentine Roman Catholic prelate (1941–2022)

His Excellency Héctor Sabatino Cardelli
- Bishop Emeritus of San Nicolás de los Arroyos
- Archdiocese: Rosario
- Appointed: 21 February 2004
- Term ended: 21 September 2016
- Predecessor: Mario Luis Bautista Maulión
- Successor: Hugo Norberto Santiago
- Previous posts: Auxiliary Bishop of Rosario and Titular Bishop of Furnos Maior (1995–1998); Bishop of Concordia (1998–2004)

Orders
- Ordination: 21 September 1968 by Guillermo Bolatti
- Consecration: 14 July 1995 by Eduardo Vicente Mirás

Personal details
- Born: 30 August 1941 Godoy, Argentina
- Died: 7 November 2022 (aged 81) Rosario, Argentina
- Motto: ¡AY DE MI SI NO EVANGELIZARA!
- Coat of arms: Héctor Sabatino Cardelli's coat of arms

Styles of Héctor Sabatino Cardelli
- Reference style: His Excellency; The Most Reverend
- Spoken style: Your Excellency
- Religious style: Bishop

Héctor Sabatino Cardelli (30 August 1941 – 7 November 2022) was an Argentine Roman Catholic prelate.

He was ordained to the priesthood in 1968. He served as auxiliary bishop of Rosario, titular bishop of Furnos Maior, later as bishop Concordia and San Nicolás de los Arroyos.

Catholic Church titles
Preceded by Mario Luis Bautista Maulión	Bishop of San Nicolás de los Arroyos; 2004–2016	Succeeded by Hugo Norberto Santiago
Preceded by Adolfo Gerstner	Bishop of Concordia; 1998–2004	Succeeded by Luis Armando Collazuol
Preceded by Julio Enrique Prado Bolaños	Tituler Bishop of Furnos Maior; 1995–1998	Succeeded by Jorge Eduardo Lozano
Preceded by —	Auxiliary Bishop of Rosario; 1995–1998	Succeeded by —
