= Raúl Martín (bishop) =

Catholic bishop in Argentina

- Archbishop of Paraná
- Church: Catholic Church
- Archdiocese: Archdiocese of Paraná
- Appointed: 28 May 2025
- Predecessor: Juan Alberto Puiggari
- Previous posts: Bishop of Santa Rosa (2013-2025); Titular Bishop of Troyna (2006-2013); Auxiliary Bishop of Buenos Aires (2006-2013)

Orders
- Ordination: 17 November 1990 by Antonio Quarracino
- Consecration: 20 May 2006 by Jorge Mario Bergoglio

Personal details
- Born: 9 October 1957 (age 68) Buenos Aires, Argentina

Raúl Martín (9 October 1957) is a prelate of the Roman Catholic Church. He served as auxiliary bishop of Buenos Aires from 2006 until 2013, when he became bishop of Santa Rosa.

== Life ==
Born in Buenos Aires, Martín was ordained to the priesthood on 17 November 1990.

On 1 March 2006, he was appointed auxiliary bishop of Buenos Aires and titular bishop of Troyna. Martín received his episcopal consecration on the following May 20 from Jorge Mario Bergoglio, archbishop of Buenos Aires, the later pope Francis, with bishop of San Martín, Guillermo Rodríguez Melgarejo, and bishop of Gualeguaychú, Jorge Eduardo Lozano, serving as co-consecrators.

He was appointed bishop of Santa Rosa on 24 September 2013.
