= Archdiocese of Santa Fe (disambiguation) =

Archdiocese of Santa Fe may refer to:

- Roman Catholic Archdiocese of Santa Fe (Latin: Archidioecesis Sanctae Fidei in America Septentrionali) — an archdiocese in New Mexico in the United States: established in 1850 and raised to an archdiocese in 1875
- Roman Catholic Archdiocese of Bogotá — an archdiocese in central Colombia: established in 1562 and raised to an archdiocese in 1564, and formerly known as the Diocese of Santafé en Nueva Granada and Archdiocese of Santafé en Nueva Granada until 1898
- Roman Catholic Archdiocese of Santa Fe de Antioquia (Latin: Archidioecesis Sanctae Fidei de Antioquia) — an archdiocese in northwestern Colombia: established in 1804, formerly known as the Diocese of Antioquía and the Diocese of Antioquía–Jericó, and raised to an archdiocese in 1988
- Roman Catholic Archdiocese of Santa Fe de la Vera Cruz (Latin: Archidioecesis Sanctae Fidei Verae Crucis) — an archdiocese in Argentina: established in 1897 and raised to an archdiocese in 1934, and formerly known as the Diocese of Santa Fe then the Archdiocese of Santa Fe
