= Archdiocese of Mendoza =

Catholic ecclesiastical territory

Coordinates: 32°53′22″S 68°50′13″W

Archdiocese of Mendoza Archidioecesis Mendozensis Arquidiócesis de Mendoza

Catholic

Location
- Country: Argentina
- Ecclesiastical province: Mendoza

Statistics
- Area: 63,839 km^{2} (24,648 sq mi)
- Population: Total; Catholics: (as of 2004); 1,373,000; 1,145,000 (83.4%)
- Parishes: 62

Information
- Denomination: Roman Catholic
- Rite: Roman Rite
- Established: 20 April 1934 (92 years ago)
- Cathedral: Our Lady of Loreto Cathedral in Mendoza
- Patron saint: St James the Greater; Our Lady of the Rosary

Current leadership
- Pope: Leo XIV
- Metropolitan Archbishop: Marcelo Daniel Colombo
- Auxiliary Bishops: Marcelo Fabián Mazzitelli
- Bishops emeritus: José María Arancibia

Map

Website
- https://arquimendoza.org.ar/

The Roman Catholic Archdiocese of Mendoza (Latin: Archidioecesis Mendozensis) is in Argentina and is a metropolitan diocese. Its suffragan sees include Neuquén and San Rafael.

== History ==
On 20 April 1934, Pope Pius XI established the Diocese of Mendoza from the Diocese of San Juan de Cuyo. It lost territory to the Diocese of San Rafael when it was created in 1961. At the same time, the Diocese of Mendoza was elevated to an archdiocese by Pope John XXIII on 10 April 1961.

== 2016–2017 sexual abuse scandal ==
On 5 May 2017, Kosaka Kumiko, a Japanese-Argentinian nun, was arrested and accused of helping priests sexually abuse children at a school for youths with hearing disabilities in Mendoza Province. Kumiko's arrest came after the arrests of two priests: Horacio Corbacho and Nicola Corradi. Three other men employed at one of the Antonio Provolo Institute for the Deaf's Argentine schools were arrested for acts. Corradi had previously been accused as early as 2009 of committing sex abuse at the Antonio Provolo Institute for the Deaf's main campus in Verona, Italy.

On 15 June 2019, it was announced that the two priests will stand trial on 5 August 2019. The two priests will face trial in Argentina, where they were jailed after being accused of sexually abusing 22 children at the Argentine school. The trial began as scheduled. Institute employee Armando Gomez also joined the two priests as a co-defendant. Former institute employee Jorge Bordón had been sentenced to 10 years in prison in 2018 for sex abuse at the institute as well. The trial is expected to last for two more months.

== Bishops ==
=== Ordinaries ===
- José Aníbal Verdaguer y Corominas (1934–1940)
- Alfonso María Buteler (1940–1973)
- Olimpo Santiago Maresma (1974–1979)
- Cándido Genaro Rubiolo (1979–1996)
- José María Arancibia (1996–2012)
- Carlos María Franzini (2012–2017)
- Marcelo Daniel Colombo (2018-

=== Coadjutor archbishop ===
- José María Arancibia (1993–1996)

=== Auxiliary bishops ===
- José Miguel Medina (bishop) (1962-1965), appointed Bishop of Jujuy
- Olimpo Santiago Maresma (1965-1974), appointed Archbishop here
- Rafael Eleuterio Rey (1983-1991), appointed Bishop of Zárate-Campana
- Sergio Osvaldo Buenanueva (2008-2013), appointed Bishop of San Francisco
- Dante Gustavo Braida Lorenzón (2015-2018), appointed Bishop of La Rioja
- Marcelo Fabián Mazzitelli (2017-

=== Other priests of this diocese who became bishops ===
- Paulino Reale Chirina, appointed Bishop of Venado Tuerto in 1989
- Pedro Daniel Martínez Perea (priest here, 1981–1986), appointed Coadjutor Bishop of San Luis in 2009

== Territorial losses ==
Year	Along with	To form
1961		Diocese of San Rafael
