= José María Arancibia =

Argentinian priest

- Archbishop Emeritus of Mendoza
- Church: Catholic Church
- Archdiocese: Archdiocese of Mendoza
- In office: 25 March 1996 – 10 November 2012
- Predecessor: Cándido Rubiolo
- Successor: Carlos María Franzini
- Previous posts: Coadjutor Archbishop of Mendoza (1993-1996); Titular Bishop of Pumentum (1987-1993); Auxiliary Bishop of Córdoba (1987-1993)

Orders
- Ordination: 22 September 1962 by Ramón José Castellano
- Consecration: 28 May 1987 by Raúl Francisco Primatesta

Personal details
- Born: 11 April 1937 (age 89) Buenos Aires, Argentina

José María Arancibia (11 April 1937) is a prelate of the Roman Catholic Church. He served as auxiliary bishop of Córdoba from 1987 until 1993 when he became coadjutor archbishop of Mendoza. He was archbishop of Mendoza from 1996 until his retirement in 2012.

== Life ==
Born in Buenos Aires, he was ordained to the priesthood on 22 September 1962.

On 26 February 1987 he was appointed auxiliary bishop of Córdoba and titular bishop of Pumentum. Arancibia received his episcopal consecration on the following 28 May from Raúl Francisco Primatesta, cardinal and archbishop of Córdoba, with archbishop of Paraná, Estanislao Esteban Karlic, and bishop of Cruz del Eje, Omar Félix Colomé, serving as co-consecrators.

On 13 February 1993 he was appointed coadjutor archbishop of Mendoza, where he was installed on 28 May. He succeeded as archbishop of Mendoza on 25 March 1996. On 10 November 2012 he retired upon reaching the age of 75 years, the retirement age for priests.
