= St. Raphael Cathedral, Surat Thani =

St. Raphael Cathedral
- อาสนวิหารอัครเทวดาราฟาเอล
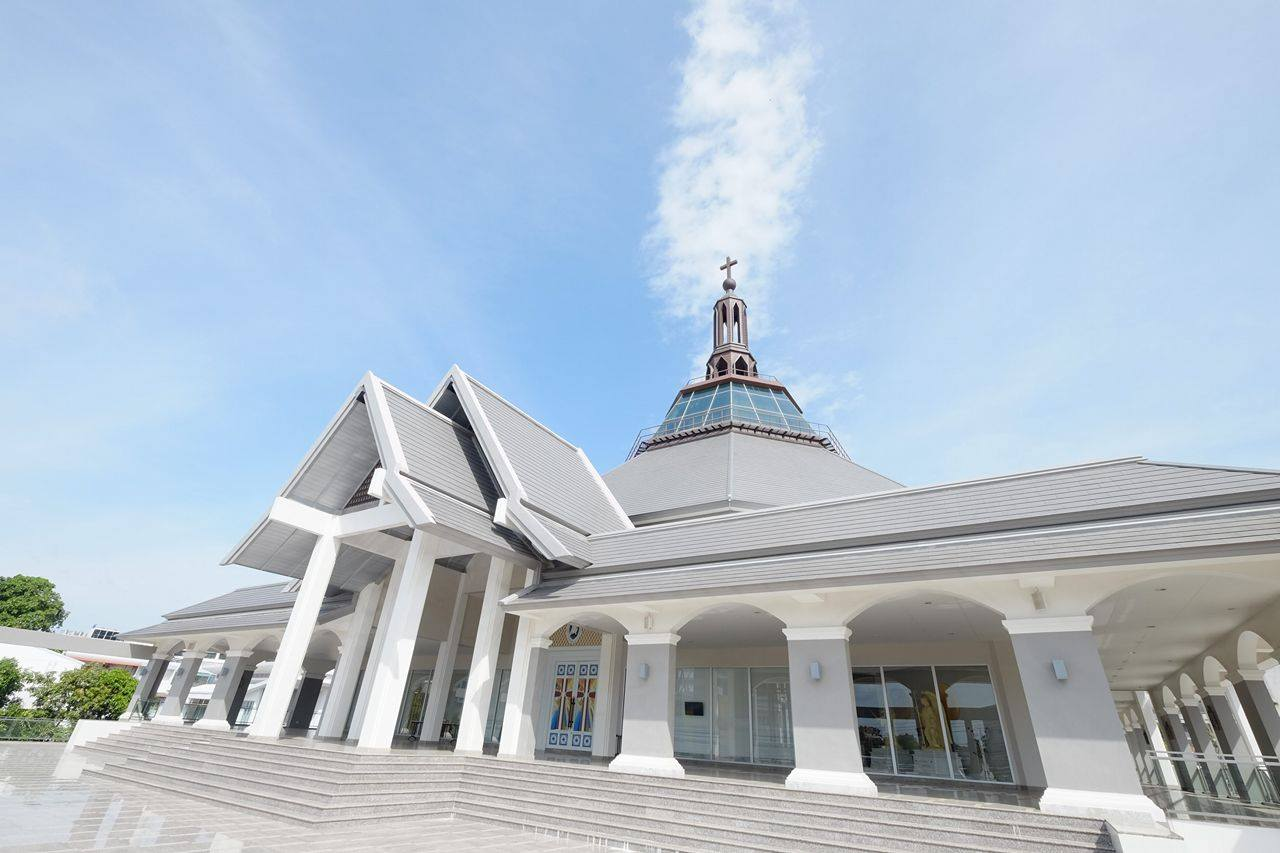
- St. Raphael Cathedral, Surat Thani (current)
- St. Raphael Cathedral
- 9.1495°N 99.3343°E
- Location: Surat Thani
- Country: Thailand
- Denomination: Roman Catholic Church

The St. Raphael Cathedral (Thai: อาสนวิหารอัครเทวดาราฟาเอล) also called Surat Thani Cathedral is the mother church of the Roman Catholic Diocese of Surat Thani. It is located in the city of Surat Thani in the province of the same name in the south of the Southeast Asian country of Thailand.

The present church was built in 1962 and became a cathedral with the creation of the diocese of Surat Thani (Dioecesis Suratthanensis or สังฆมณฑลสุราษฎร์ธานี), which was established in 1969 with the Bull "Qui Regno Christi" of Pope Paul VI.

It is under the pastoral responsibility of the Bishop Joseph Prathan Sridarunsil.

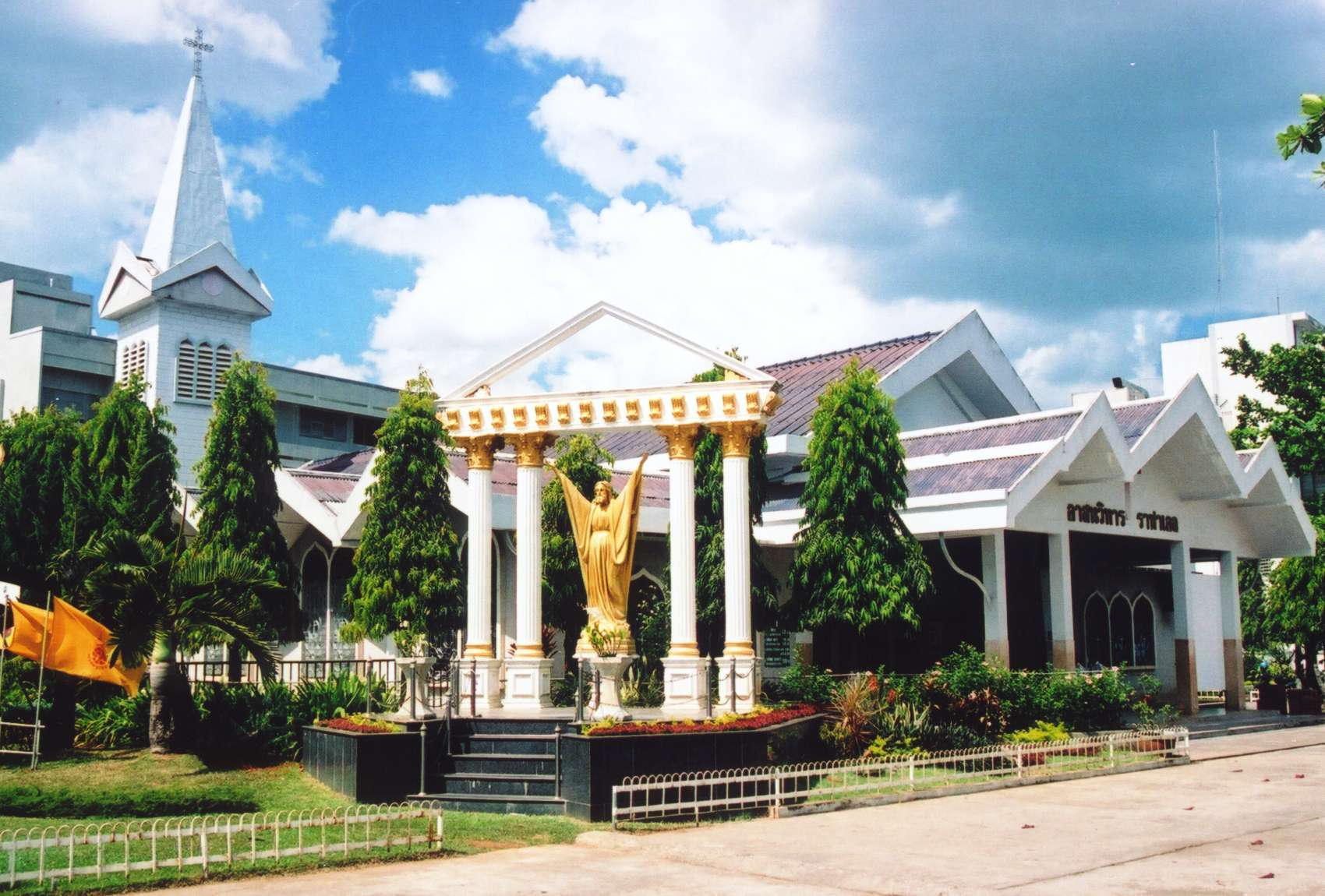
St. Raphael Cathedral, Surat Thani (old)

== See also ==
- Roman Catholicism in Thailand
- Assumption Cathedral, Bangkok
