= Eduardo Eliseo Martín =

Argentine Roman Catholic prelate (born 1953)

- Archbishop of Rosario
- Archdiocese: Rosario
- Appointed: 4 July 2014
- Installed: 24 August 2014
- Predecessor: José Luis Mollaghan
- Previous post: Bishop of Villa de la Concepción del Río Cuarto (2006–2014)

Orders
- Ordination: 26 December 1980 by Mario Picchi
- Consecration: 19 May 2006 by Paulino Reale Chirina

Personal details
- Born: 26 December 1953 (age 72) Venado Tuerto, Santa Fe, Argentina
- Motto: El Verbo se hizo carne
- Coat of arms

Styles of Eduardo Eliseo Martín
- Reference style: His Excellency; The Most Reverend
- Spoken style: Your Excellency
- Religious style: Archbishop

Eduardo Eliseo Martín (born 26 December 1953) is an Argentine prelate of the Roman Catholic Church. Since 2014, he is the current Archbishop of Rosario and was the Bishop of Villa de la Concepción del Río Cuarto from 2006 to 2014.

== Ministry ==
Martín was ordained as a priest on 26 December 1980 and incardinated in the Diocese of Venado Tuerto. He worked primarily as a parish priest, he was also a lecturer at the seminary in La Plata and vicar general of the diocese.

On 21 February 2006, Pope Benedict XVI appointed Martín Bishop of Villa de la Concepción del Río Cuarto. He was consecrated bishop on 19 May by Bishop Emeritus Paulino Reale Chirina. On 13 March 2009, Martín performed his first quinquennial visit ad limina.

On 4 July 2014, Pope Francis appointed Martín as Metropolitan Archbishop of Rosario. The ingress took place on 24 August. On 2 May 2019, Martín performed his second quinquennial visit ad limina. On 11 February 2020, on the occasion of the World Day of the Sick, while celebrating Mass in the province of Santa Fe, he recalled that "life is sacred" and "belongs only to God" and considered it "sad and disappointing" that in the province of Santa Fe persist in applying the abortion protocols.

Catholic Church titles
Preceded by José Luis Mollaghan	Archbishop of Rosario; 4 July 2014 – present	Succeeded by Incumbent
Preceded by Ramón Artemio Staffolani	Bishop of Villa de la Concepción del Río Cuarto; 21 February 2006 – 4 July 2014	Succeeded by Adolfo Armando Uriona
