= Carlos María Franzini =

- Archbishop of Mendoza
- Church: Catholic Church
- Archdiocese: Archdiocese of Mendoza
- In office: 10 November 2012 – 8 December 2017
- Predecessor: José María Arancibia
- Successor: Marcelo Daniel Colombo
- Previous post: Bishop of Rafaela (2000-2012)

Orders
- Ordination: 13 August 1977
- Consecration: 19 June 2000 by Jorge Casaretto

Personal details
- Born: 6 September 1951 Buenos Aires, Argentina
- Died: 8 December 2017 (aged 66) Mendoza, Mendoza Province, Argentina
- Coat of arms

Carlos María Franzini (6 September 1951 – 8 December 2017) was a prelate of the Roman Catholic Church. He served as bishop of Rafaela from 2000 until 2012, when he became archbishop of Mendoza.

== Life ==
Born in Buenos Aires, he was ordained to the priesthood on 13 August 1977, serving as a priest in the diocese of San Isidro.

On 29 April 2000, he was appointed bishop of Rafaela. Polti Franzini received his episcopal consecration on the following 19 June from Alcides Jorge Pedro Casaretto, bishop of San Isidro, with archbishop of Paraná, Estanislao Esteban Karlic, and archbishop of Mendoza, José María Arancibia, serving as co-consecrators.

On 10 November 2012, he was appointed archbishop of Mendoza, where he was installed on 9 February 2013.

He died on 8 December 2017, at the age of 66.
