= José Luis Mollaghan =

Argentinian Roman Catholic prelate (1946–2025)

His Excellency José Luis Mollaghan
- Archbishop Emeritus of Rosario
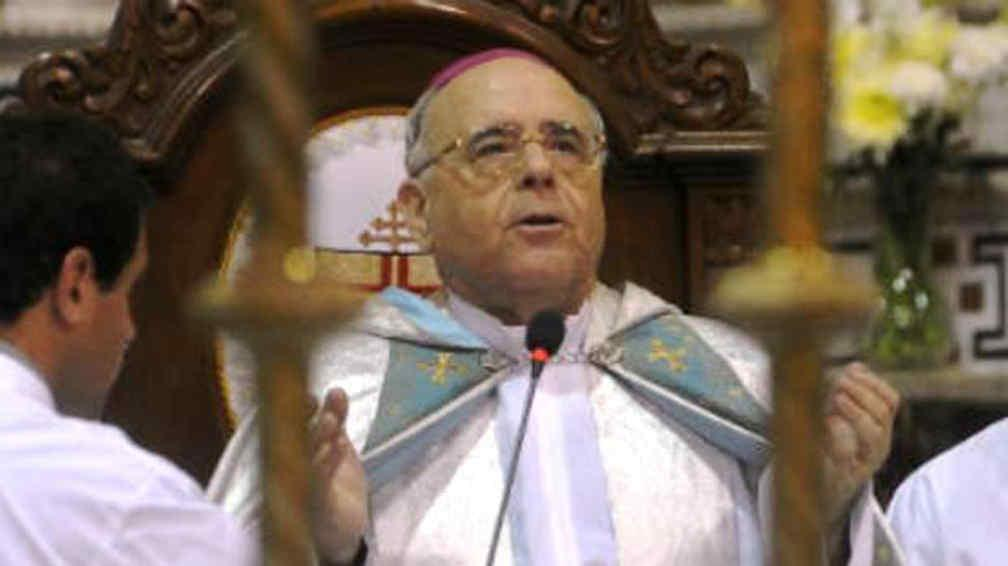
- Archdiocese: Rosario
- Appointed: 22 December 2005
- Term ended: 19 May 2014
- Predecessor: Eduardo Mirás
- Successor: Eduardo Eliseo Martín
- Other post: Official of the Roman Curia (2014–2025)
- Previous posts: Auxiliary Bishop of Buenos Aires and Titular Bishop of Theuzi (1993–2000); Bishop of San Miguel (2000–2005)

Orders
- Ordination: 19 March 1971 by Jacques-Paul Martin
- Consecration: 2 October 1993 by Antonio Quarracino

Personal details
- Born: 2 May 1946 Buenos Aires, Argentina
- Died: 7 June 2025 (aged 79) Buenos Aires, Argentina
- Motto: Juxta crucem Jesu
- Coat of arms

Styles of José Luis Mollaghan
- Reference style: His Excellency; The Most Reverend
- Spoken style: Your Excellency
- Religious style: Archbishop

José Luis Mollaghan (2 May 1946 – 7 June 2025) was an Argentinian prelate of the Roman Catholic Church. From 2014 he was an official of the Congregation for the Doctrine of the Faith. He had previously held positions in Argentina, including Auxiliary Bishop of Buenos Aires and Archbishop of Rosario.

== Biography ==
Mollaghan was born in Buenos Aires, Argentina. After the seminary he studied philosophy and theology at the Seminary of the Immaculate Conception of the Archdiocese of Buenos Aires.

In 1967 he obtained his licentiate in theology and a degree in canon law at the Pontifical Gregorian University in Rome. There he was ordained a priest by Bishop Jacques-Paul Martin on 19 March 1971. He then fulfilled pastoral assignments in Buenos Aires for several years and in 1975 began teaching law at the Pontifical Catholic University of Argentina.

On 22 July 1993, Pope John Paul II appointed him Auxiliary Bishop of Buenos Aires with the titular see of Theuzi. He was consecrated a bishop on 2 October by Cardinal Antonio Quarracino. He held several posts in the administration of the archdiocese including vicar for the administration and moderator of the curia. He served on several committees of the Argentine Episcopal Conference, becoming a member of its Executive Committee and Standing Committee and one of its delegates to the Latin American Bishops' Council. From 1994 to 1999 he was secretary general of the Argentine Bishops' Conference. In Buenos Aires, he served at first alongside Jorge Bergoglio, later Pope Francis, who was an auxiliary until 1997, and then for Bergoglio who became coadjutor archbishop in 1997 and archbishop in 1998.

Pope John Paul II named Mollaghan Bishop of San Miguel on 17 May 2000. On 22 December 2005, Pope Benedict XVI appointed him Archbishop of Rosario, where he was installed on 18 March 2006.

On 19 May 2014, Pope Francis assigned Mollaghan to the Congregation for the Doctrine of the Faith in Rome to work on a commission responsible for handling cases of clerical pedophilia. Because the commission had not been established, he moved to Buenos Aires to signify his release from responsibility for the Rosario diocese. He told a congregation at a festive celebration in Rosario in August: "The technical director decides the changes. I just wanted to stay in Rosario, but he sent me to Buenos Aires to make work easy for me." He remained in Argentina, living in Buenos Aires for several months, before moving to Rome. The seven-member Commission was established on 11 November 2014 with responsibility for sexual abuse of minors, heresy, apostasy, misuse of the sacrament of penance, and the ordination of women. Argentine newspapers interpreted Mollaghan's assignment in Rome as an "elegant" way to remove him from Rosario following an investigation into the mismanagement of church funds and referred to Mollaghan as "an old rival" of the pope. Mollaghan denied that he represented a more conservative faction of the Argentine hierarchy and pointed to his long service alongside Bergoglio in Buenos Aires.

Mollaghan died on 7 June 2025, at the age of 79.

Catholic Church titles
Preceded by Eduardo Mirás	Archbishop of Rosario; 2005–2014	Succeeded by Eduardo Eliseo Martín
Preceded by Abelardo Francisco Silva	Bishop of San Miguel; 2000–2005	Succeeded by Sergio Alfredo Fenoy
Preceded by Antonio José López Castillo	Titular Bishop of Theuzi; 1993–2000	Succeeded by Jorge Solórzano Pérez
Preceded by —	Auxiliary Bishop of Buenos Aires; 1993–2000	Succeeded by —
