= Santa Maria Addolorata a piazza Buenos Aires =

Nuestra Señora de los Dolores
- Sorrowful Blessed Virgin Mary at Piazza Buenos Aires (in English); Beata Mariæ Perdolentis ad forum Bonærense (in Latin)
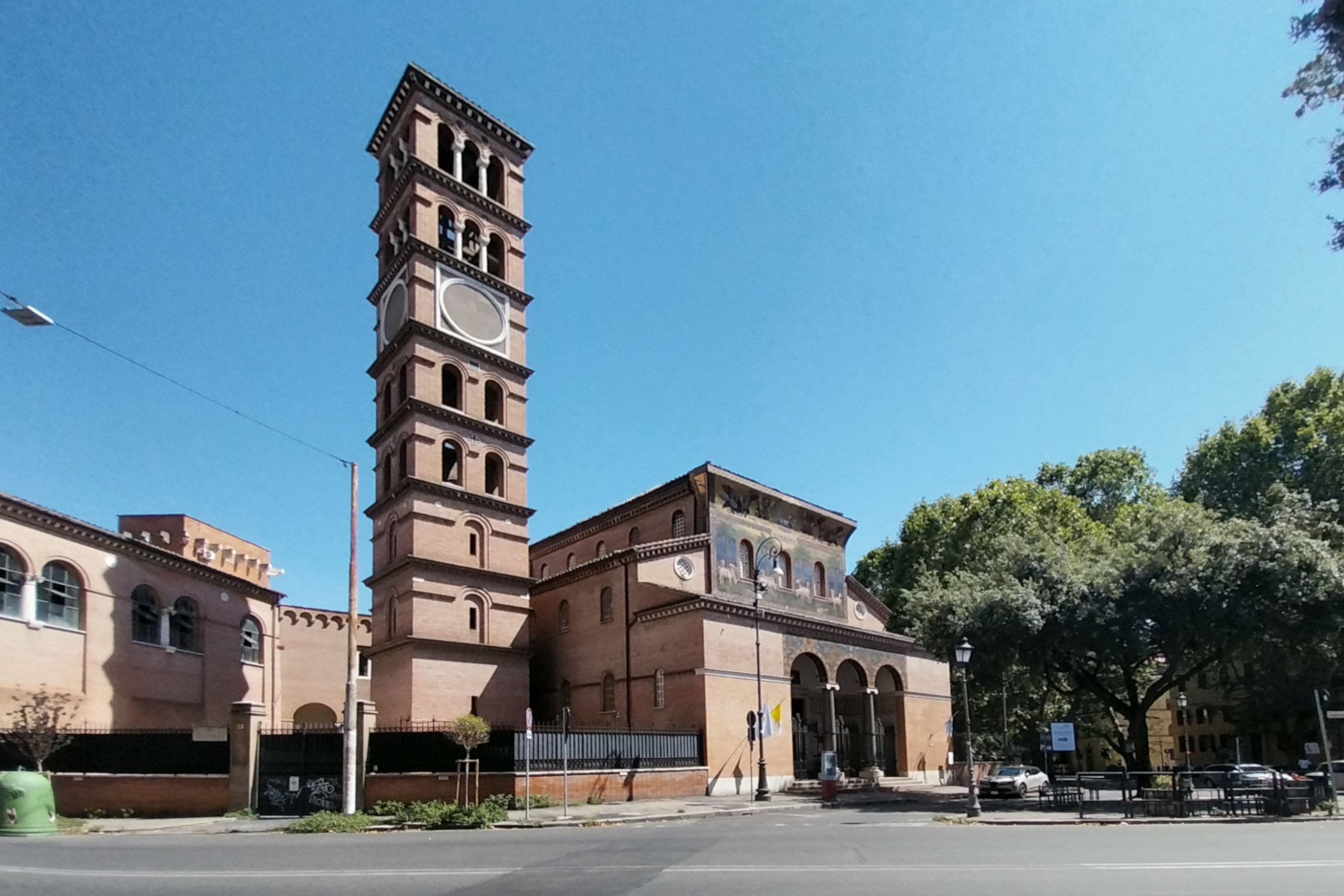
- Nuestra Señora de los Dolores (in Spanish); Santa Maria Addolorata in Piazza Buenos Aires (in Italian)
- Click on the map for a fullscreen view
- 41°55′05″N 12°30′03″E
- Location: Viale Regina Margherita 81, Rome
- Country: Italy
- Denomination: Roman Catholic
- Tradition: Roman rite

History
- Status: Titular church, national church
- Dedication: Mary, mother of Jesus (as Our Lady of Sorrows)
- Consecrated: 1930

Architecture
- Architect: Giuseppe Astorri
- Architectural type: Church
- Style: Neo-paleochristian, Neo-byzantine
- Groundbreaking: 1910
- Completed: 1930

Santa Maria Addolorata a Piazza Buenos Aires (English: Our Lady of Sorrows at Piazza Buenos Aires, Spanish: Nuestra Señora de los Dolores) is a titular church and the Argentine national church, on Viale Regina Margherita, Rome.

== History ==
It was founded by the Argentine priest Msgr. José León Gallardo with donations from the Argentine bishops, with the first stone being laid on 9 July 1910, the centenary of Argentine independence. Mrs. Saenz Peña, wife of the President of Argentina, was present at the ceremony. Construction took twenty years, and the church was finally inaugurated in 1930. From then until 1989, the church was served by Mercedarian fathers; it is now served by Argentine diocesan clergy from a community in an adjoining house.

It was built by the architect Giuseppe Astorri with a 7-storey campanile and a 2-storey façade in the style of ancient Christian architecture, with a central depiction of the Lamb and symbols of the four Evangelists. The interior is also in ancient, Roman-Byzantine style, with a nave and two aisles divided by Ionic columns, a Cosmatesque-style pulpit and lectern and a polychrome marble floor (laid in geometric patterns with the national coat of arms of Argentina in the centre, and a memorial slab to its founder, which was presented by the Argentine cardinals and bishops at the Second Vatican Council).

In the apse at the east end is a mosaic of Our Lady of Sorrows by Giambattista Conti and a high altar decorated with onyx and covered by a baldachino supported by four granite Corinthian columns. The choir is separated from the nave by an altar ring of white marble which includes intaglia and bronze gates with the national coat-of-arms and the arms of the Order of the Mercedarians.

At one altar is a small statue of Our Lady of Luján, principal patron of Argentina. Since 1967, it was a Cardinal's Titular Church.

== Special festivals and Masses ==
The feast of Our Lady of Sorrows is celebrated on 15 September and 15 February (due to different calendars placing the feast on different days, it is celebrated twice in this church).

Mass is celebrated in Spanish on the first Sunday in the month, and occasionally at other times.

== Cardinal-Priest ==
Pope Paul VI established "Beata Maria Virgine Addolorata a Piazza Buenos Aires" as titular church on 6 June 1967 based on the Apostolic Constitution "Sunt hic Romæ".

- Nicolas Fasolino 6 June 1967 appointed-13 August 1969, died
- Raúl Francisco Primatesta 5 March 1973 appointed-1 May 2006, died
- Estanislao Esteban Karlic 24 November 2007 appointed- 8 August 2025, died
