= Nicolás Fasolino =

Argentine Cardinal

His Eminence Nicolás Fasolino
- Archbishop of Santa Fe de la Vera Cruz
- Photo.
- Archdiocese: Santa Fe de la Vera Cruz
- See: Santa Fe de la Vera Cruz
- Appointed: 20 October 1932
- Term ended: 13 August 1969
- Predecessor: Juan Agustín Boneo
- Successor: Vicente Faustino Zazpe
- Other post: Cardinal-Priest of Beata Maria Vergine Addolorata a piazza Buenos Aires (1967-69)
- Previous post: Vicar General of Buenos Aires (1925-26)

Orders
- Ordination: 28 October 1909
- Consecration: 21 December 1932 by Filippo Cortesi
- Created cardinal: 26 June 1967 by Pope Paul VI
- Rank: Cardinal-Priest

Personal details
- Born: Nicolás Fasolino; 3 January 1887 Buenos Aires, Argentina
- Died: 13 August 1969 (aged 82) Santa Fe, Argentina
- Parents: Nicolás Fasolino; María Antonia Coletta
- Education: Pontifical Gregorian University
- Motto: Fratribus meis nomen Tuun narrabo

Nicolás Fasolino (January 3, 1887 – August 13, 1969) was an Argentine Cardinal of the Roman Catholic Church. He served as Archbishop of Santa Fe from 1932 until his death, and was elevated to the cardinalate in 1967.

== Biography ==
Nicolás Fasolino was born in Buenos Aires, and studied at the Conciliar Seminary there before going to Rome to study at the Pontifical Gregorian University. He was ordained to the priesthood on October 28, 1909, and then did pastoral work in Buenos Aires from 1911 to 1916.

From 1913 to 1922, Fasolino successively served as a professor at the Center of Religious Studies in Buenos Aires, Vice-Chancellor of the archdiocese, and general visitor to the Young Workers Association of Argentina. He then resumed his pastoral ministry, and was vicar general of Buenos Aires from 1925 to 1926. He became a protonotary apostolic on July 19, 1928.

On October 20, 1932, Fasolino was appointed Bishop of Santa Fe by Pope Pius XI. He received his episcopal consecration on the following December 21 from Archbishop Filippo Cortesi, with Archbishop Santiago Copello and Bishop Fortunato Devoto serving as co-consecrators.

Fasolino was promoted to the rank of Archbishop upon the elevation of Santa Fe to a metropolitan archdiocese on April 20, 1934. He later attended the Second Vatican Council from 1962 to 1965, and was created Cardinal Priest of Beata Maria Vergine Addolorata a piazza Buenos Aires by Pope Paul VI in the consistory of August 13, 1969.

Cardinal Fasolino died in Santa Fe, at the age of 82, having served as the Ordinary of that city for thirty-six years. He is buried at the metropolitan cathedral of Santa Fe.

Preceded by Juan Agustín Boneo	Archbishop of Santa Fe; 1932–69	Succeeded by Vicente Faustino Zazpe
