= Mendoza Cathedral =

Our Lady of Loreto Cathedral
- Catedral Nuestra Señora de Loreto
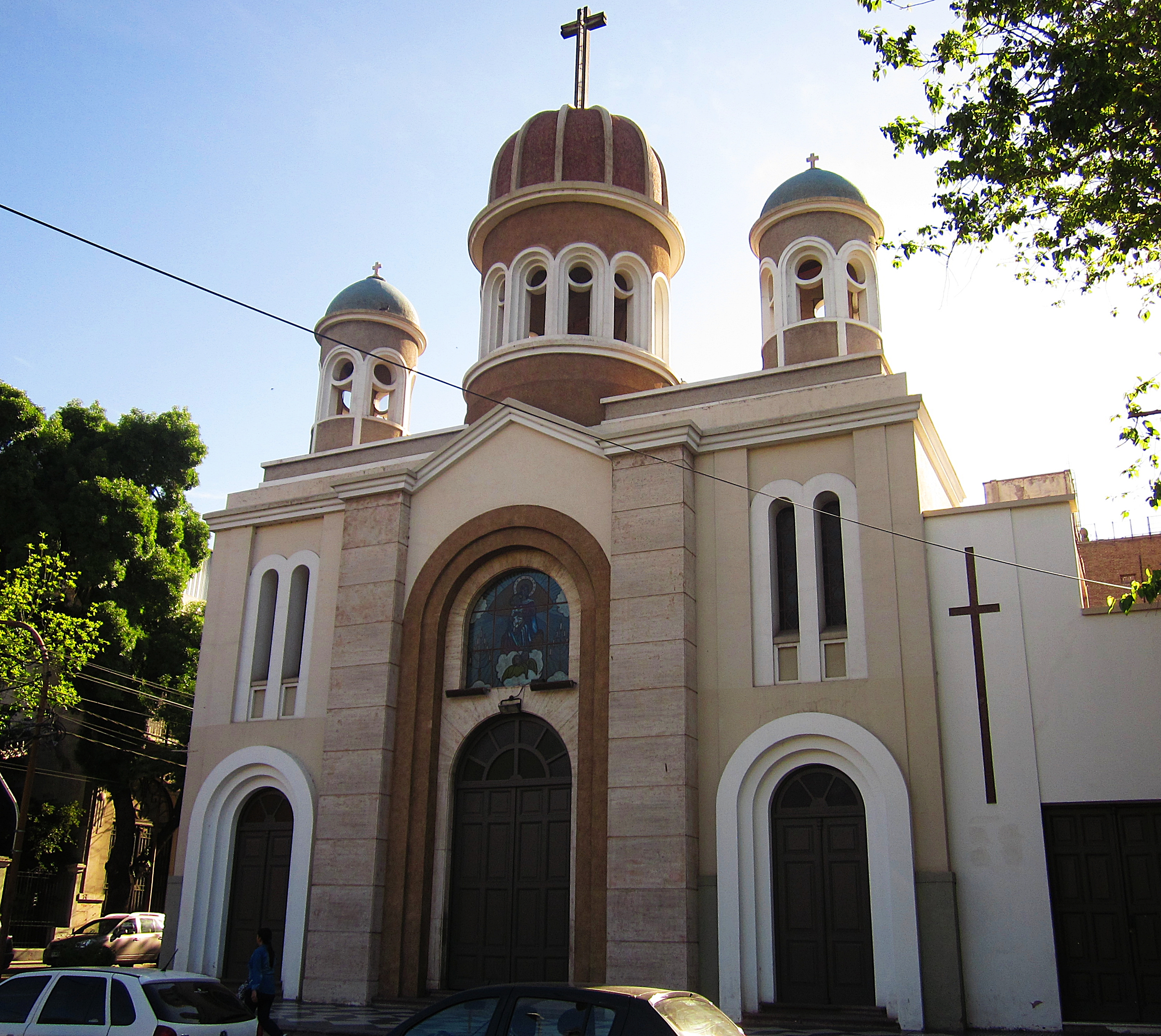
- Our Lady of Loreto Cathedral
- Location: Mendoza
- Country: Argentina
- Denomination: Roman Catholic Church

Administration
- Archdiocese: Roman Catholic Archdiocese of Mendoza

The Our Lady of Loreto Cathedral (Spanish: Catedral Nuestra Señora de Loreto), also called Mendoza Cathedral, is located in Mendoza, Argentina. It was a chapel in the nineteenth century and built as an interim cathedral in 1934.

The original cathedral located in the Old Town was destroyed by an earthquake in 1861. Its replacement was planned for the New Town opposite the Plaza Independencia, but after construction began it had to be demolished, dedicating the land to the construction of another building.

The Archbishopric is undertaking the construction of a new cathedral, Christ the Redeemer, in Central Park. Until work is completed on that project, the Church of Our Lady of Loreto continues to serve as a cathedral, despite its capacity of 500 people being insufficient to serve the city of Mendoza.

== See also ==
- Roman Catholicism in Argentina
- Our Lady of Loreto
