= Mario Luis Bautista Maulión =

Argentine priest (1934–2020)

- Archbishop of Paraná
- Church: Catholic Church
- Archdiocese: Archdiocese of Paraná
- In office: 29 April 2003 – 4 November 2010
- Predecessor: Estanislao Esteban Karlic
- Successor: Juan Alberto Puiggari
- Previous posts: Bishop of San Nicolás de los Arroyos (1995-2003); Titular Bishop of Febiana (1986-1995); Auxiliary Bishop of Rosario (1986-1995)

Orders
- Ordination: 11 June 1960 by Silvino Martínez
- Consecration: 23 May 1986 by Jorge Manuel López

Personal details
- Born: 4 December 1934 Carcarañá, Santa Fe Province, Argentina
- Died: 27 September 2020 (aged 85)

Mario Luis Bautista Maulión (4 December 1934 – 27 September 2020) was an Argentine Roman Catholic archbishop.

Maulión was born in Carcarañá (Santa Fe) and was ordained to the priesthood on 11 June 1960. On 20 March 1986, he was appointed titular bishop in partibus infidelium of Febiana and auxiliary bishop of Diocese of Rosario (serving from 1988 to 1995). He was consecrated bishop in the cathedral of Rosario on 23 May 1986, by Monsignor Jorge Manuel López, Archbishop of Rosario. He was bishop of the Roman Catholic Diocese of San Nicolás de los Arroyos from 1995 to 2003. He served as Metropolitan Archbishop of the Roman Catholic Archdiocese of Paraná from 1995 to 2010.
