= Gualeguaychú Cathedral =

St. Joseph's Cathedral
- Catedral de San José de Gualeguaychú
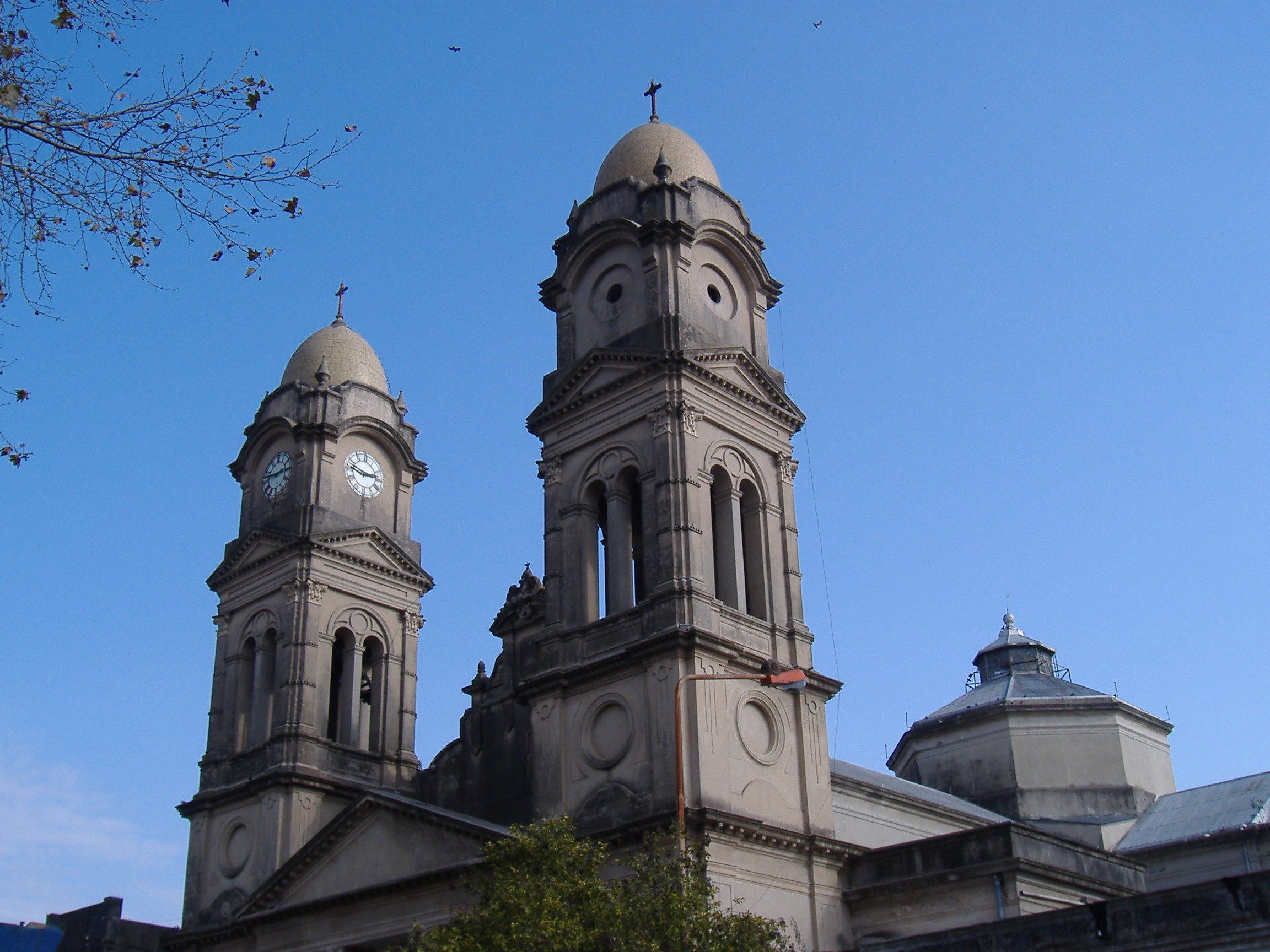
- St. Joseph's Cathedral
- 33.0082°S 58.5141°W
- Location: Gualeguaychú
- Country: Argentina
- Denomination: Roman Catholic Church

St. Joseph's Cathedral (Spanish: Catedral de San José de Gualeguaychú), also known as Gualeguaychú Cathedral, is the cathedral church of the Roman Catholic Diocese of Gualeguaychú in Argentina. It is located at San José Street 25 in the city of Gualeguaychú, Entre Ríos,

The first stone was placed on May 30, 1863, under the patronage and in the presence of then-governor-general Justo José de Urquiza. It was dedicated and consecrated in 1890 by the parish priest Luis N. Palma. The parish church was elevated to cathedral status on June 29, 1957, through the bull "adoranda Cuandoquidem" of then Pope Pius XII, with the rise of the diocese.

The cathedral has the shape of a Latin cross, with an octagonal cupola. The Eclectic style, which was the mainstream at the time of its construction, is visible in its fine architectural lines and neoclassical facade, which includes a portal with columns crowned by a low triangular pediment and flanked by two towers. Each bell tower is crowned with a small elongated dome, crowned by a cross.

It preserves among other treasures, an image of the Our Lady of the Rosary of more than 170 years of antiquity.

== See also ==
- Catholic Church in Argentina

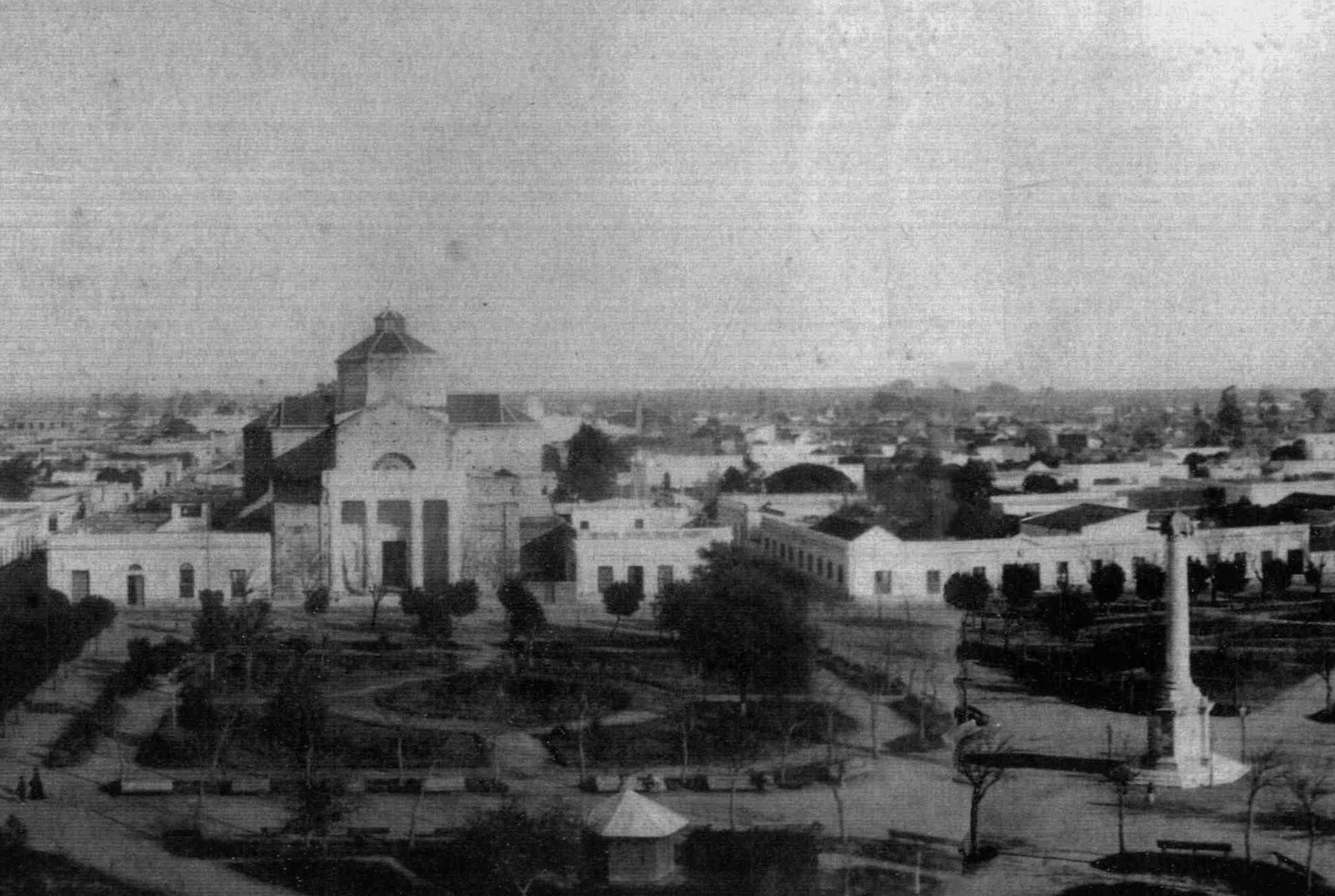
The city and the Cathedral circa 1900
