= Diocese of Venado Tuerto =

Catholic ecclesiastical territory

Diocese of Venado Tuerto Dioecesis Cervi Lusci Diócesis de Venado Tuerto

Catholic

Location
- Country: Argentina
- Ecclesiastical province: Rosario
- Metropolitan: Rosario

Statistics
- Area: 14,000 km^{2} (5,400 sq mi)
- Population: Total; Catholics: (as of 2010); 216,000; 206,000 (95.4%)
- Parishes: 43

Information
- Denomination: Catholic
- Rite: Roman Rite
- Established: 12 August 1963 (63 years ago)
- Cathedral: Cathedral of the Immaculate Conception in Venado Tuerto
- Patron saint: Immaculate Conception

Current leadership
- Pope: Leo XIV
- Bishop: Han Lim Moon
- Metropolitan Archbishop: Eduardo Eliseo Martín
- Bishops emeritus: Gustavo Arturo Help

Website
- www.obispadosn.org.ar

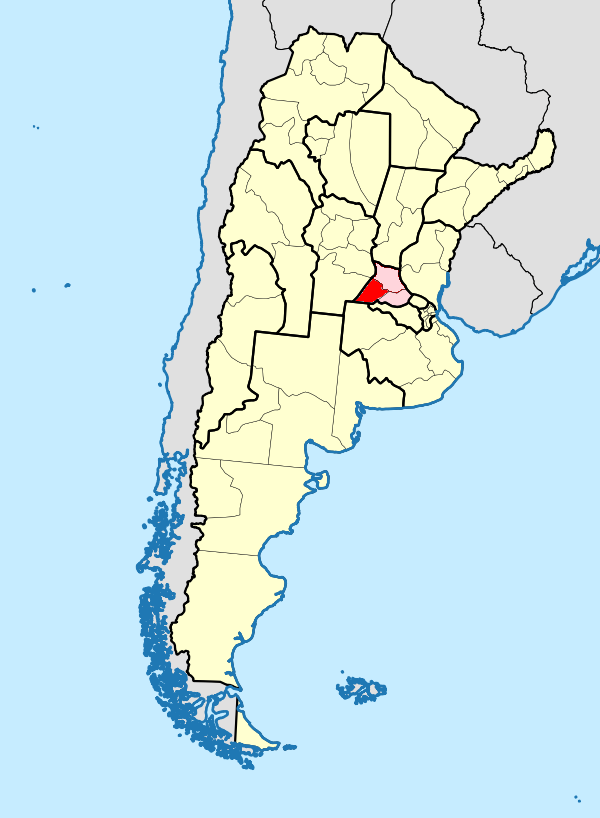
Diocese of Venado Tuerto

The Diocese of Venado Tuerto is an Argentinian diocese within the Ecclesiastical Province of Rosario.

== History ==
On 12 August 1963, Pope Paul VI established the Diocese of Venado Tuerto from the Diocese of Rosario, which on the same day was elevated to an archdiocese and Venado Tuerto became one of its suffragan sees.

== Bishops ==
=== Ordinaries ===
- Fortunato Antonio Rossi (1963–1977), appointed Bishop of San Nicolás de los Arroyos
- Mario Picchi S.D.B. (1977–1989)
- Paulino Reale Chirina (1989–2000)
- Gustavo Arturo Help (2000–2021)
- Han Lim Moon (2021–present)

=== Other priest of this diocese who became bishop ===
- Eduardo Eliseo Martín, appointed Bishop of Villa de la Concepción del Río Cuarto in 2006
