= Leda Bergonzi =

Argentine faith healer

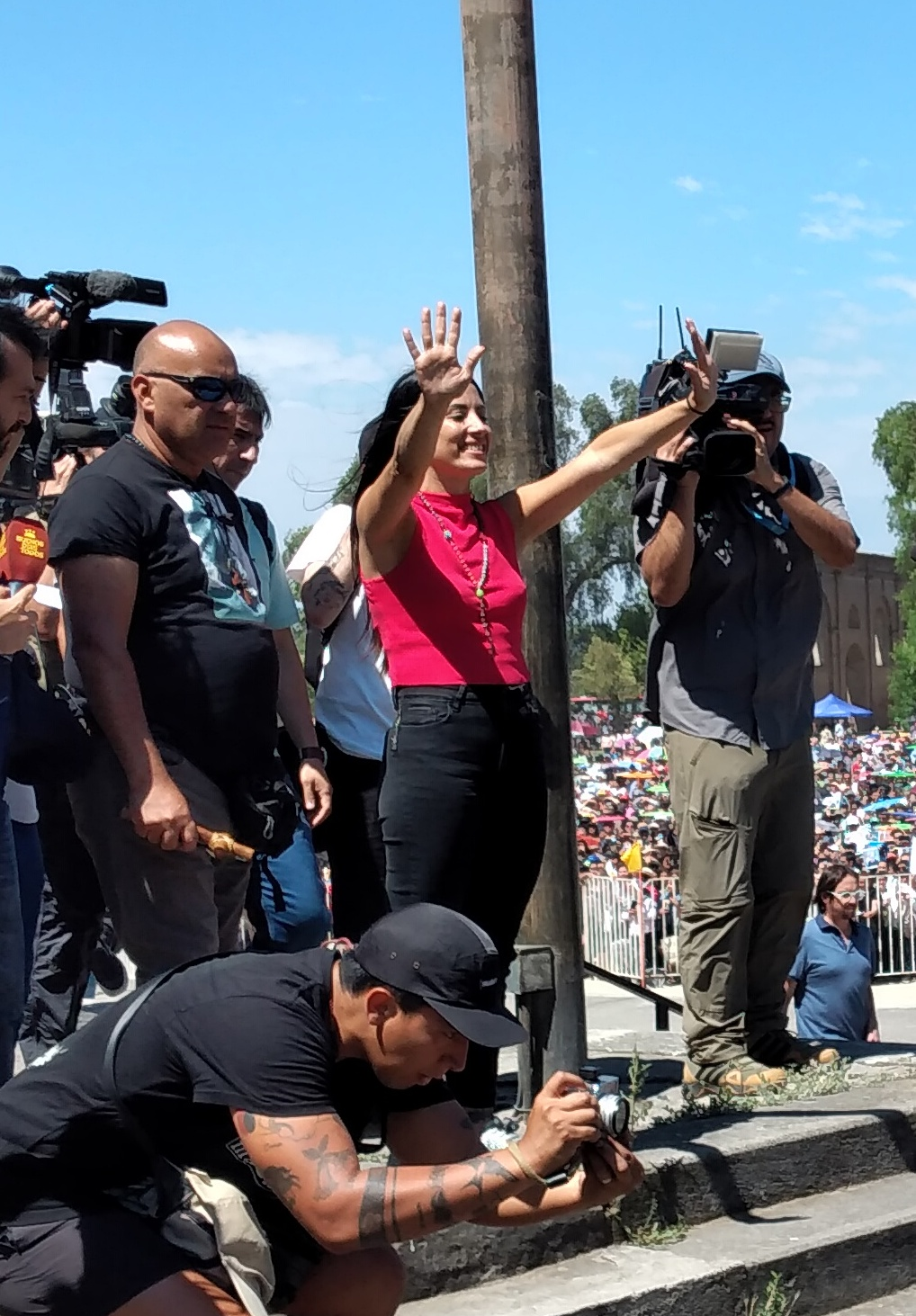
- Leda Bergonzi visiting the Votive Temple of Maipú in Santiago, Chile, January 2024.
- Born: 1979 (age 46–47); San Lorenzo, Santa Fe, Argentina
- Known for: faith healing
- Children: 5
- Website: ledabergonzi.com

Leda Bergonzi (born 1979) is a controversial Argentine faith healer based in Rosario, who has drawn tens of thousands of pilgrims from all over Argentina and South America. Her religious movement, called Breath of the Living God (Spanish: Soplo de Diós Viviente) boasted around 1,000 members as of 2023. However, in September 2024, the Archbishop of Rosario prohibited her religious practices, including the laying on of hands, and expelled her from the Church. Bergonzi's style is unconventional; she has been called "modern and sexy." She dresses fashionably and wears heavy makeup.

== Career ==
In the mid 2010s, Bergonzi led a small but steadily growing Tuesday prayer group in Rosario. She said it was at this time that she first realized she had a divine healing ability. Her popularity skyrocketed after a local news article about her was published and people learned that two family members of the soccer luminary Lionel Messi had attended her prayer sessions. After that, social media helped propel her to fame quickly: as of early 2024, upwards of 20,000 pilgrims had attended her weekly gatherings, many hoping to be healed of illnesses such as dysautonomia, paralysis, or even terminal cancer. Many pilgrims have shared stories of being miraculously healed of their illnesses. For example, in 2024, a man who was blind in one eye said his eyes started to water instantly when Bergonzi laid her hands on him. Rumors of other people being healed include a child whose congenital cardiopathy was healed as well as a woman who had been unable to walk, who was able to do so after receiving Bergonzi's blessing.

To enter the premises, pilgrims, some of whom traveled long distances, had to wait upwards of twelve hours in lines up to a mile long, with many camping outside the venue the night before. Pilgrims came from all over Argentina, as well as from Brazil, Uruguay and Chile, and many famous people attended her events, including the musician Nacha Guevara; the soccer star Jonás Gutierrez; Lionel Messi's mother, Celia; and the wife of Jorge Macri, María Belén Ludueña, among others.

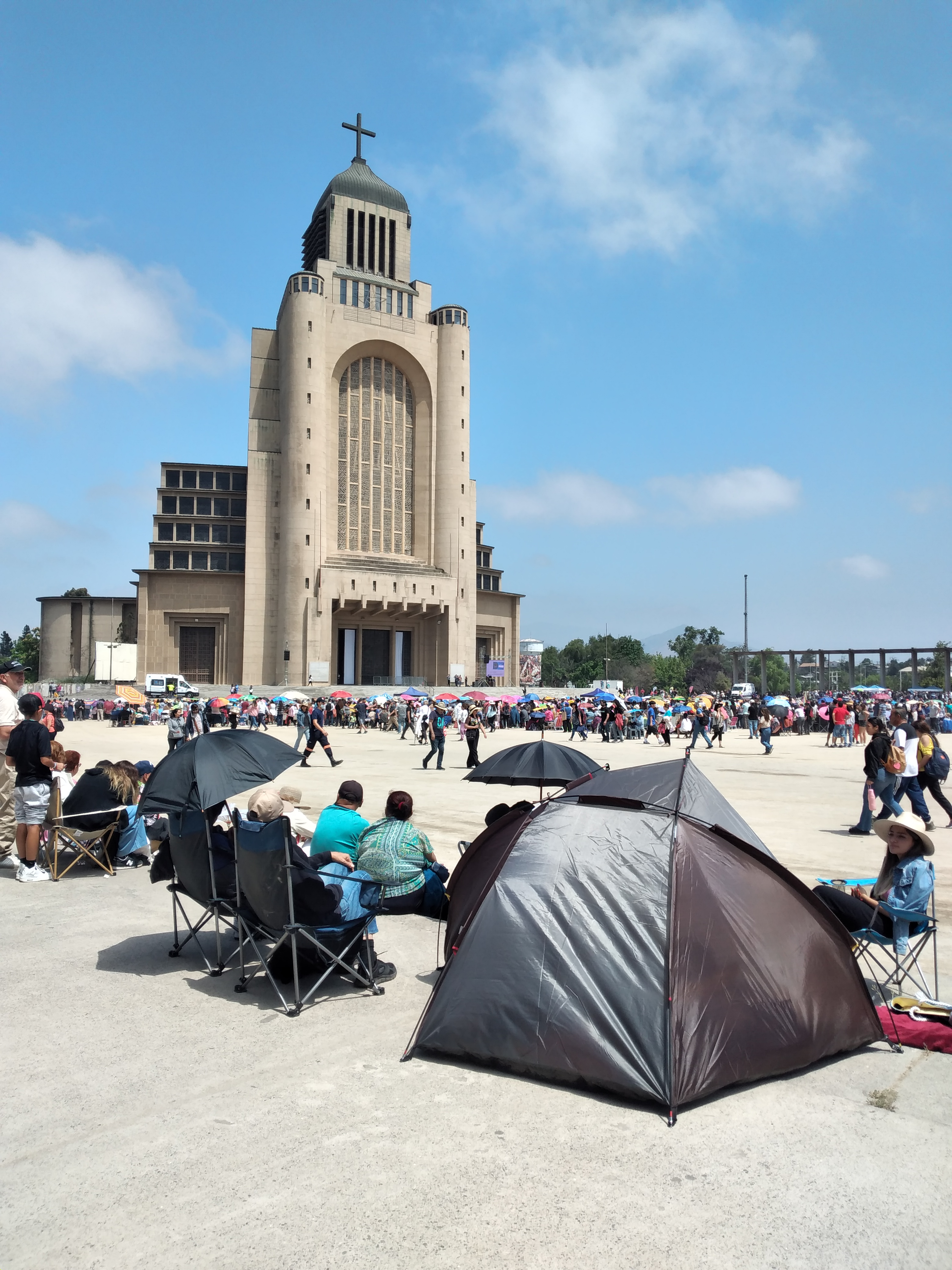
Followers camping out before Bergonzi's visit to the Votive Temple of Maipú, January 2024.

During her large-scale Tuesday prayer sessions, Bergonzi sings, prays and speaks in tongues. Meanwhile a film crew records the event for posterity. The experience is so moving for some attendees that they end up crying, fainting, or convulsing.

As a woman professing Catholicism, Bergonzi may give blessings, but she may not administer confession or the Eucharist; therefore, a priest named José Calandra, known colloquially as Padre Pepe, attends her gatherings for that purpose.

There are presently over a dozen faith healers in Argentina; however, the popularity of organized religion has declined in Argentina and across Latin America in recent decades. Some Catholic leaders expressed optimism that she would bring renewed energy to the faith, while others worry that her style is too flashy. Bergonzi often wears skinny jeans and other fashionable garments while attempting to cure pilgrims or relay a sense of peace.

The Catholic Church had recognized her miraculous healing powers by 2023; however, by September 2024, the local Church had severed all ties with her. The following month, Bergonzi responded by saying that the prohibition imposed on her with respect to laying on of hands was only valid in the Archdiocese of Rosario; she alleged that she was free to continue the practice in other locations.

== Controversies ==
In 2024, Bergonzi had two fraud complaints leveled against her, one by a former producer, and the second by the provincial deputy Amalia Granata, who said she had received government money for her shows.

In June 2024, the nonprofit organization Libre Mente, which fights against religious cults and pseudoscience, formally asked the Argentine government to do an expert analysis of her healing powers. According to the nonprofit, Leda exercises "psychological manipulation" by promising healing to "vulnerable victims."

During a visit to the Votive Temple of Maipú, Leda Bergonzi made controversial statements about cancer, claiming that it is an "emotional disease" and its origin is "the lack of forgiveness." This led the archbishop of Santiago, Fernando Chomalí, who has a master's degree in bioethics, to rebuke her statements. The Archdiocese of Rosario and the Rosario Oncology Association also disagreed with her claim.

In 2026, Bergonzi filed a criminal complaint alleging an identity theft scheme in which fake social media profiles were being used to scam her followers. There were also audio and video messages in which impersonators, possibly with the help of artificial intelligence, asked for money in exchange for healing. According to her complaint, hundreds of her followers may have been affected.

Bergonzi also made controversial statements about trans people, saying, "Look, we evangelize. One of our missions is to evangelize street girls, transgender people, night workers. You talk to them and they tell you how they started to change their sex. Why? Many of them say it is because of anger and unforgiveness." Argentine national deputy Esteban Paulón replied that "it is unfortunate that a message of faith is transformed into a message of hate."

== Personal life ==
Bergonzi grew up in a religious middle class family with five siblings, including a twin sister. Her grandmother was especially religious and devoted to the Virgin Mary. She is a former seamstress who produced work uniforms before becoming a faith healer. She has five children and a granddaughter.

== See also ==
- Megachurch
- Catholic Church in Argentina
- Charismatic Christianity
