= Eduardo Mirás =

Argentinian priest and theologian (1929–2022)

- Archbishop of Rosario
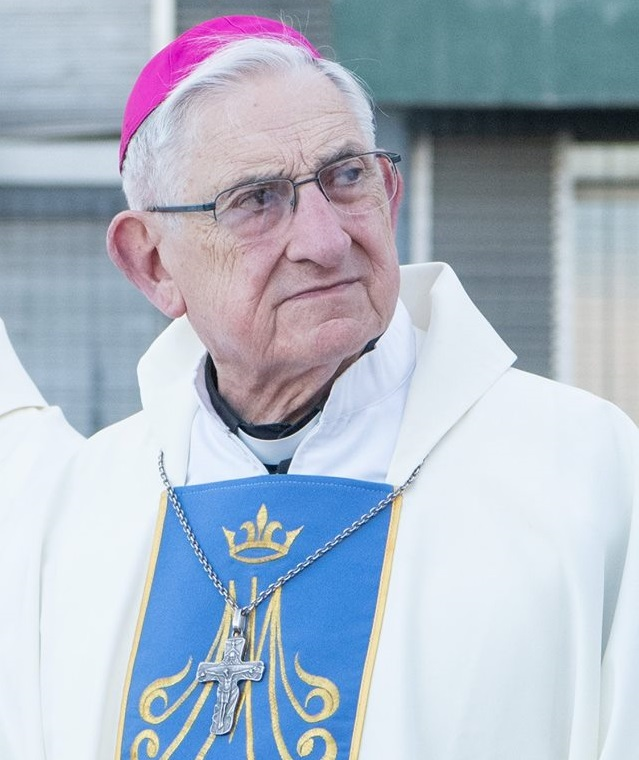
- Eduardo Mirás in 2019
- Church: Catholic Church
- Archdiocese: Archdiocese of Rosario
- In office: 20 November 1993 – 22 December 2005
- Predecessor: Jorge Manuel López
- Successor: José Luis Mollaghan
- Previous posts: Titular Bishop of Ambia (1984-1993); Auxiliary Bishop of Buenos Aires (1984-1993)

Orders
- Ordination: 3 August 1952 by Antonio Rocca
- Consecration: 27 April 1984 by Juan Carlos Aramburu

Personal details
- Born: Eduardo Vincente Mirás; 14 November 1929 Buenos Aires, Argentina
- Died: 24 February 2022 (aged 92) Rosario, Santa Fe Province, Argentina
- Motto: Jesús Es El Hijo De Dios

Eduardo Vincente Mirás (14 November 1929 – 24 February 2022) was an Argentine Roman Catholic bishop.

Mirás was born in Argentina and was ordained to the priesthood in 1952. He served as titular bishop of Ambia and as auxiliary bishop of the Roman Catholic Archdiocese of Buenos Aires from 1984 to 1994 and as archbishop of the Roman Catholic Archdiocese of Rosario, Argentina, from 1994 to 2005 when he retired.

Mirás died from complications of COVID-19 in Rosario, Santa Fe, on 24 February 2022, at the age of 92, during the COVID-19 pandemic in Argentina.
