= Vicente Faustino Zazpe =

- Archbishop of Santa Fe
- Church: Catholic Church
- Archdiocese: Archdiocese of Santa Fe
- In office: 13 August 1969 – 24 January 1984
- Predecessor: Nicolás Fasolino
- Successor: Edgardo Gabriel Storni
- Previous posts: Coadjutor Archbishop of Santa Fe (1968-1969); Titular Archbishop of Aquaviva (1968-1969); Bishop of Rafaela (1961-1968)

Orders
- Ordination: 28 November 1948
- Consecration: 3 September 1961 by Antonio Caggiano

Personal details
- Born: Vicente Faustino Zazpe Zarategui; 15 February 1920 Buenos Aires, Argentina
- Died: 24 January 1984 (aged 63)

Monsignor Vicente Faustino Zazpe Zarategi (15 February 1920 – 24 January 1984) was an archbishop of the Roman Catholic Church of Argentina.

Zazpe (also sometimes spelled Zaspe) was born to Spanish Navarre immigrants in Santa Fe. He attended Buenos Aires Medical School and was ordained priest on 28 November 1948. After Pope John XXIII had appointed him Bishop of Rafaela on 12 June 1961, he took part in the Second Vatican Council. He succeeded as archbishop of Santa Fe on 13 August 1969.

== See also ==
- Edgardo Gabriel Storni
- Enrique Angelelli
- Roman Catholic Archdiocese of Santa Fe de la Vera Cruz

== Literature ==
- Ludger Antonius Müller. "Zazpe, Vincente Faustino". Biographisch-Bibliographisches Kirchenlexikon (BBKL) (in German). Vol. 38. Bautz. cols. 1542–1547.
