= Diocese of Concordia in Argentina =

Catholic ecclesiastical territory

Coordinates: 31.3974°S 58.0181°W

Diocese of Concordia Dioecesis Foroconcordiana Diócesis de Concordia

Catholic
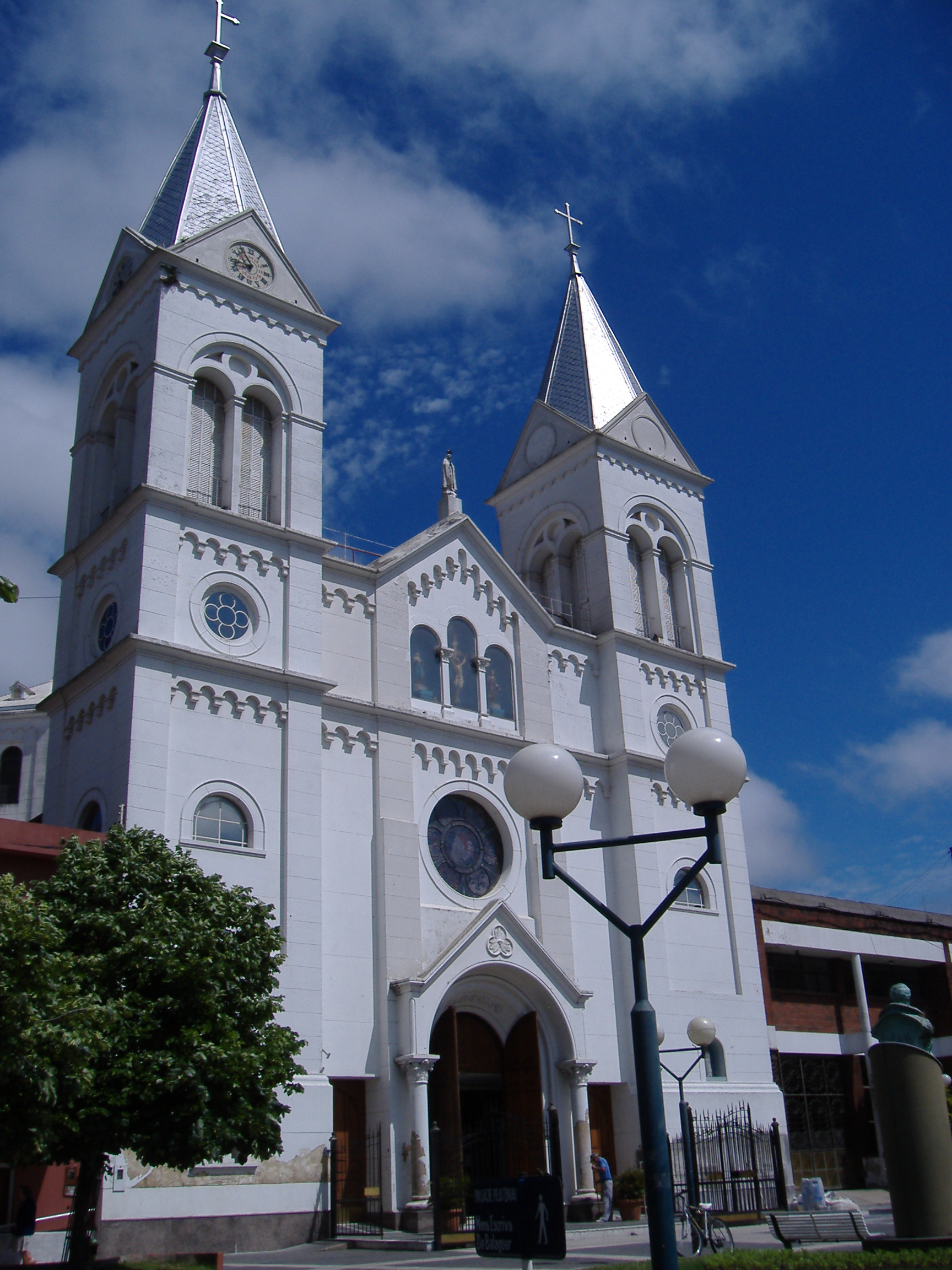
- Cathedral of St. Anthony of Padua

Location
- Country: Argentina
- Ecclesiastical province: Paraná
- Metropolitan: Paraná

Statistics
- Area: 15,000 km^{2} (5,800 sq mi)
- Population: Total; Catholics: (as of 2006); 303,000; 272,000 (89.8%)
- Parishes: 30

Information
- Denomination: Roman Catholic
- Rite: Roman Rite
- Established: 10 April 1961 (65 years ago)
- Cathedral: Cathedral of St Anthony of Padua in Concordia
- Patron saint: Immaculate Conception

Current leadership
- Pope: Leo XIV
- Bishop: Gustavo Gabriel Zurbriggen
- Metropolitan Archbishop: Juan Alberto Puiggari
- Bishops emeritus: Luis Armando Collazuol

Website
- Website of the Diocese

The Roman Catholic Diocese of Concordia (erected 10 April 1961) is in Argentina and is a suffragan of the Archdiocese of Paraná.

== Ordinaries ==
- Ricardo Rösch (1961–1976)
- Adolfo Gerstner (1977–1998)
- Héctor Sabatino Cardelli (1998–2004), appointed Bishop of San Nicolás de los Arroyos
- Luis Armando Collazuol (2004–2023), retired
- Gustavo Gabriel Zurbriggen (2023– )

== External links and references ==
- "Diocese of Concordia". Catholic-Hierarchy. ^{[self-published]}
