= Diocese of Gualeguaychú =

Catholic ecclesiastical territory

Diocese of Gualeguaychú Dioecesis Gualeguaychensis Diócesis de Gualeguaychú

Catholic
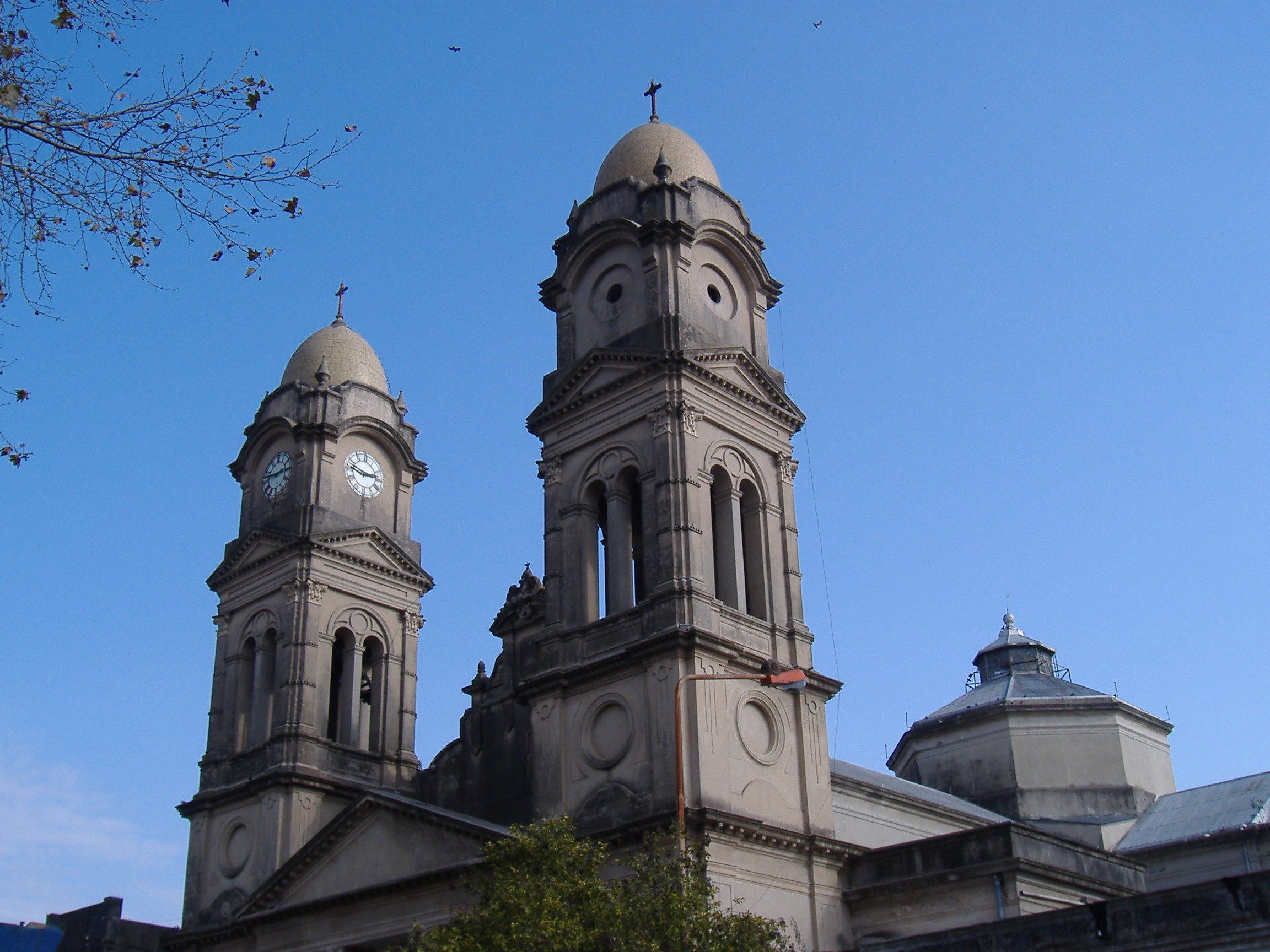
- Cathedral of St. Joseph by Bernardo Poncini

Location
- Country: Argentina
- Metropolitan: Archdiocese of Paraná
- Headquarters: Gualeguaychú, Entre Ríos Province, Argentina

Statistics
- Area: 33,887 km^{2} (13,084 sq mi)
- Population: Total; Catholics: (as of 2023); 386,752; 280,525 (72.5%)
- Parishes: 35

Information
- Denomination: Catholic Church
- Sui iuris church: Latin Church
- Rite: Roman Rite
- Established: 11 February 1957; 69 years ago
- Cathedral: St. Joseph's Cathedral, Gualeguaychú
- Patron saint: Saint Joseph; Our Lady of the Rosary
- Secular priests: 41 (34 Diocesan, 7 Religious Orders)

Current leadership
- Pope: Leo XIV
- Bishop: Héctor Luis Zordán, M.SS.CC.
- Metropolitan Archbishop: Raúl Martín

Website
- Website of the Diocese

The Roman Catholic Diocese of Gualeguaychú is a Latin suffragan bishopric in the ecclesiastical province of the Metropolitan Archdiocese of Paraná in Entre Ríos Province, eastern-central Argentina.

Its cathedral episcopal see is Catedral San José, dedicated to Saint Joseph, in Gualeguaychú, also in Entre Rios province, which also has a Minor basilica : Basílica de la Inmaculada Concepción del Uruguay, dedicated to the Immaculate Conception, in Concepción del Uruguay.

== History ==
Established on 11 February 1957 as Diocese of Gualeguaychú / Gualeguaychen(sis) (Latin), on territory split off from its Metropolitan, the Archdiocese of Paraná.

== Statistics ==
As of 2023, it pastorally served 280,525 Catholics (72.5% of 386,752 total) on 33,887 km² in 35 parishes and 1 mission with 41 priests (34 diocesan, 7 religious), 11 deacons and 49 lay religious (13 brothers, 36 sisters).

== Leadership ==
=== Bishops of Gualeguaychú ===
- Jorge Ramón Chalup (13 March 1957 – 11 July 1966)
- Pedro Boxler (25 April 1967 – 5 December 1996), retired
- Luis Guillermo Eichhorn (5 December 1996 – 30 November 2004), appointed Bishop of Morón
- Jorge Eduardo Lozano (22 December 2005 – 31 August 2016), appointed Coadjutor Archbishop of San Juan de Cuyo
- Héctor Luis Zordán, M.SS.CC. (28 March 2017 – Present)

=== Other priests of this diocese who became bishop ===
- Ricardo Oscar Faifer (1964-2002), appointed Bishop of Goya in 2002
- Mauricio Landra (1998-2023), appointed Auxiliary Bishop of Mercedes-Luján in 2023

== See also ==
- List of Catholic dioceses in Argentina

== Sources and external links ==
- "Diocese of Gualeguaychú". Catholic-Hierarchy. ^{[self-published]}
