= Diocese of Surat Thani =

Latin Catholic diocese in Thailand

Diocese of Surat Thani Diœcesis Suratthanensis สังฆมณฑลสุราษฎร์ธานี

Location
- Country: Thailand
- Ecclesiastical province: Bangkok
- Metropolitan: Bangkok

Statistics
- Area: 76,562 km^{2} (29,561 sq mi)
- Population: Total; Catholics: (as of 2004); 9,015,380; 6,682 (0.1%)

Information
- Denomination: Catholic
- Sui iuris church: Latin Church
- Rite: Roman Rite
- Established: 26 June 1969
- Cathedral: St.Raphael Cathedral, Surat Thani

Current leadership
- Pope: Leo XIV
- Bishop: Paul Trairong Multree
- Metropolitan Archbishop: Francis Xavier Vira Arpondratana
- Bishops emeritus: Joseph Prathan Sridarunsil

Map
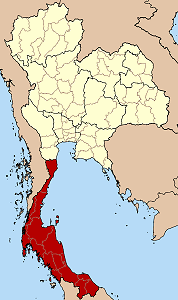

Website
- Official website

The Diocese of Surat Thani (Diœcesis Suratthanensis, Thai: สังฆมณฑลสุราษฎร์ธานี) in southern Thailand was founded in 1969, when it was split off from the Diocese of Ratchaburi by the papal bull Qui Regno Christi. It is a suffragan diocese of the Archdiocese of Bangkok. The area of Surat Thani was evangelized by the Salesians of Don Bosco in the 1930s.

The diocese covers an area of 76,562 km^{2}, covering all of the southern provinces of Thailand, including Prachuap Khiri Khan as its northernmost province. As of 2001, of its nine million citizens, 6,682 or 0.1% are members of the Catholic Church. The diocese is divided into 39 parishes, which are grouped by four regions.

== Bishops ==
- Pietro Luigi Carretto, S.D.B. (June 26, 1969 - June 21, 1988 retired)
- Michael Praphon Chaicharoen, S.D.B. (June 21, 1988 - May 20, 2003 died)
- Joseph Prathan Sridarunsil, S.D.B. (October 9, 2004 - July 8, 2024)
- Paul Trairong Multree (July 8. 2024 – present)

== Cathedral ==
The St.Raphael Cathedral (Thai: อาสนวิหารอัครเทวดาราฟาเอล) is in the town of Surat Thani at 9°9′0″N 99°20′4″E. The church was built in 1962, and became a cathedral when the diocese was established in 1969.

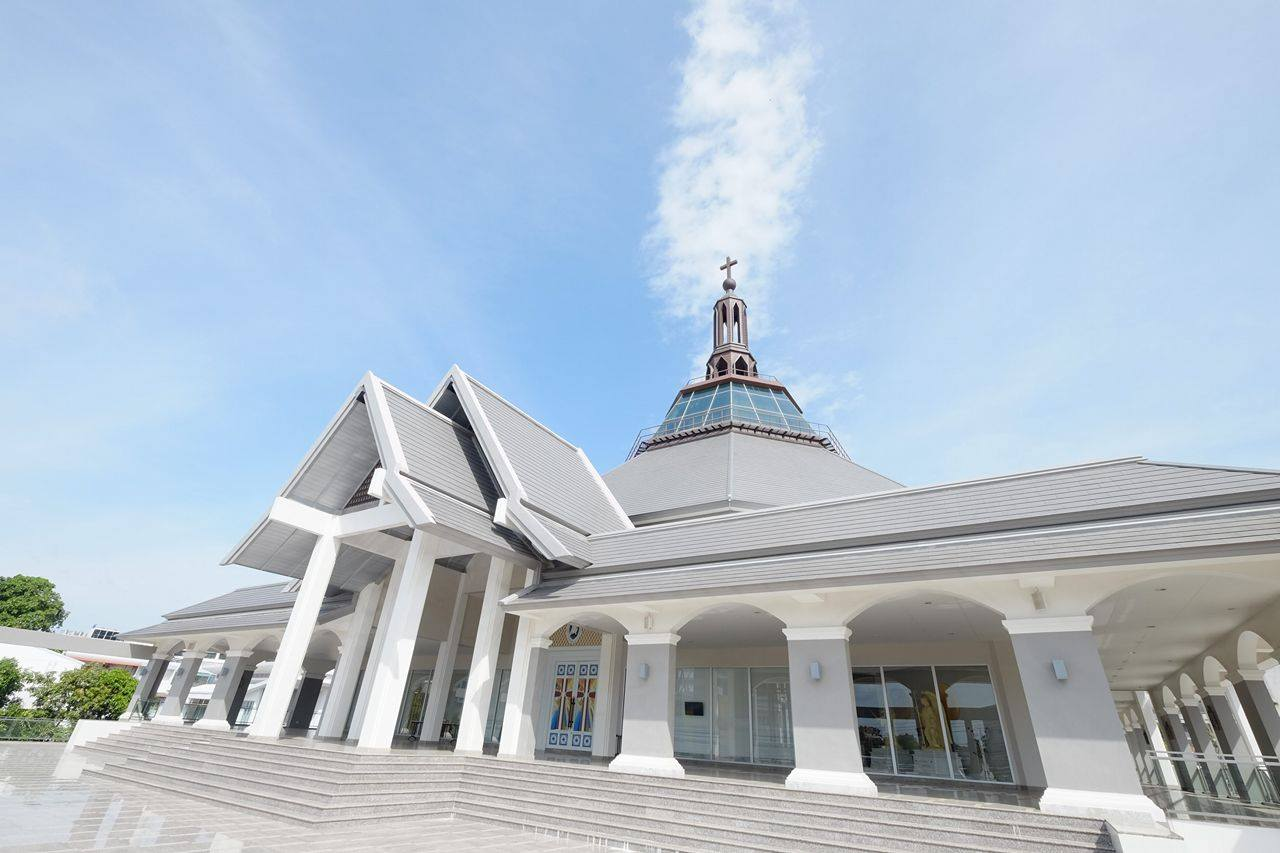
St.Raphael Cathedral, Surat Thani (current)

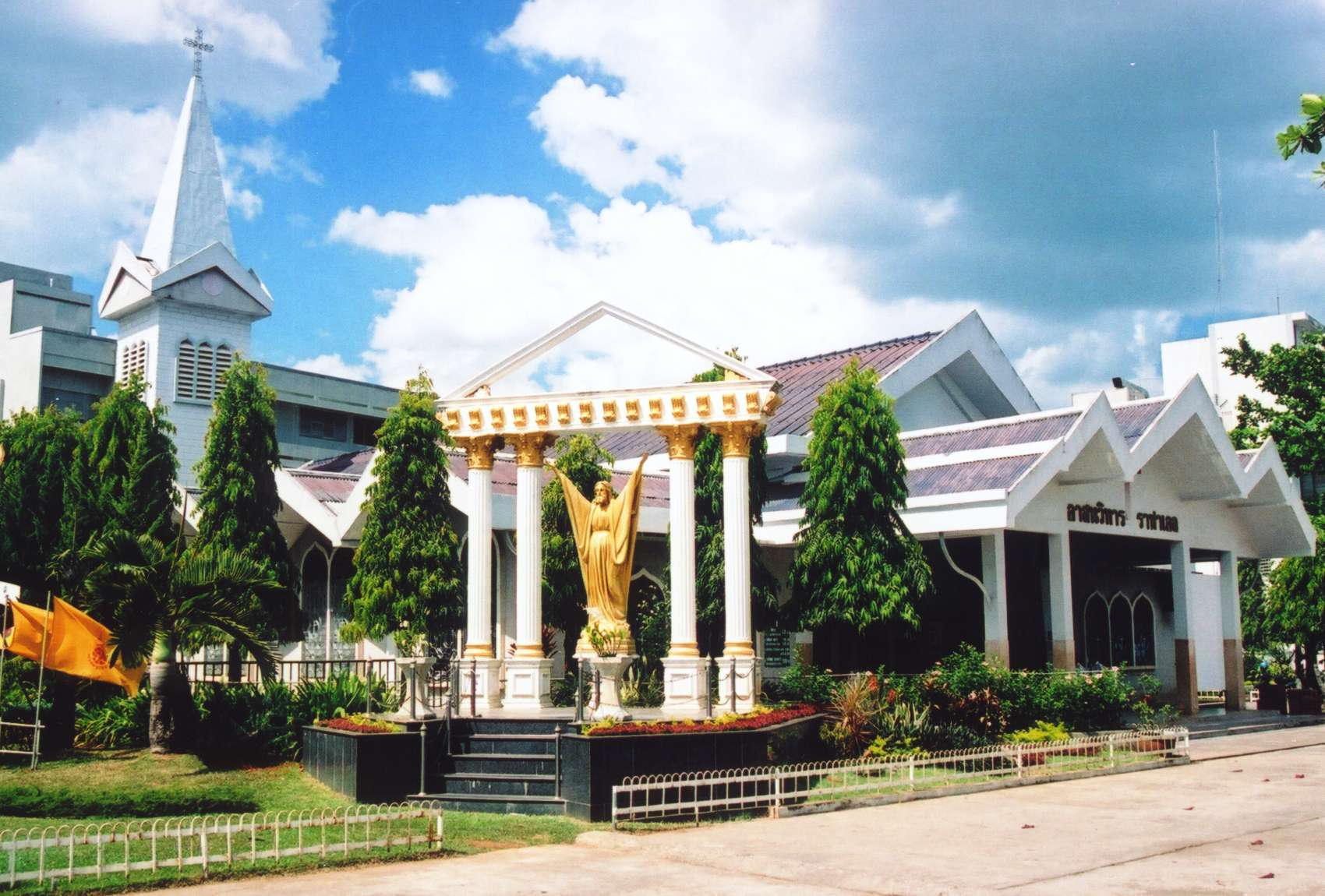
St.Raphael Cathedral, Surat Thani (old)

== See also ==
- Roman Catholicism in Thailand
