= Edgardo Gabriel Storni =

Argentinian archbishop convicted of sexual abuse

- Archbishop emiritus of Santa Fe de la Vera Cruz
- Previous posts: Titular bishop of Croae; Auxiliary bishop of Santa Fe

Personal details
- Born: April 6, 1936 Santa Fe, Argentina
- Died: February 20, 2012 (aged 75) La Falda, Argentina
- Coat of arms: Edgardo Gabriel Storni's coat of arms

Ordination history
History
Priestly ordination
- Date: December 23, 1961
Episcopal consecration
- Consecrated by: Vicente Faustino Zazpe
- Date: March 25, 1977

Edgardo Gabriel Storni (6 April 1936 – 20 February 2012) was an archbishop of Santa Fe de la Vera Cruz. He was investigated and found guilty for sexual abuse of seminarians in 2009.

== Background ==
Storni was born on 6 April 1936 in Santa Fe, Argentina to Víctor Rodolfo and Blanca Cordín. He was ordained a priest on 23 December 1961. Storni. On 4 January 1977, he was appointed auxiliary bishop of the Archdiocese of Santa Fe by Pope Paul VI.

On 28 August 1984, Storni was promoted to the position of archbishop of the metropolitan see of Archdiocese of Santa Fe de la Vera Cruz, taking charge of the archdiocese on 30 September 1984.

== Abuse allegations ==
He was investigated by the church in 1994 for alleged abuse of numerous seminarians. He resigned in October 2002 at the age of 66, following reports of abuse against dozens of young men and boys, some as young as 15 or 16. In 2009, he was convicted and sentenced to eight years in prison for the sexual abuse of a seminarian, who was reportedly 18 years old at the time of the abuse. Due to his age, he was permitted to serve his sentence at home.

In 2011, an appeals court overturned the sentence and ordered a lower court to re-sentence him. However, before this could occur, he died on February 20, 2012. He retained the title of Santa Fe de la Vera Cruz Archbishop Emeritus until his death.
