= Joseph Prathan Sridarunsil =

Thai bishop (born 1946)

Joseph Prathan Sridarunsil SDB
- Bishop Emeritus of Surat Thani
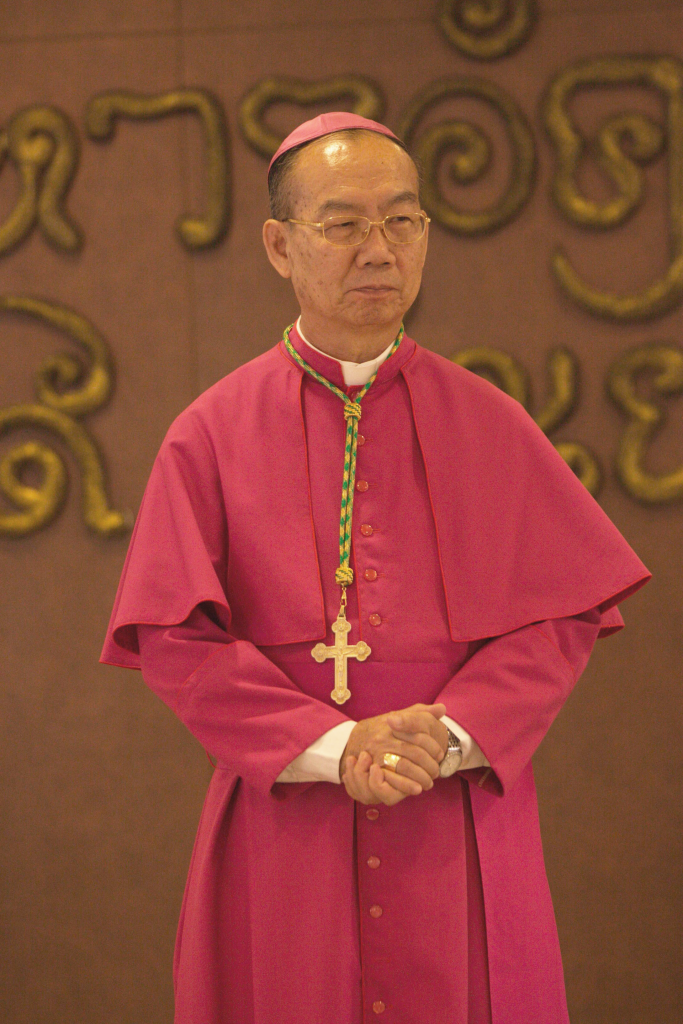
- Native name: โยเซฟ ประธาน ศรีดารุณศีล
- Church: Catholic Church
- Diocese: Diocese of Surat Thani
- In office: October 9, 2004 – July 8, 2024
- Predecessor: Michael Praphon Chaicharoen
- Successor: Paul Trairong Multree
- Other post: Apostolic Administrator of Surat Thani (2024)

Orders
- Ordination: June 29, 1975 by Pope Paul VI
- Consecration: November 28, 2004 by Crescenzio Sepe

Personal details
- Born: February 9, 1946 (age 80) Wat Phleng, Ratchaburi province, Thailand
- Coat of arms

Joseph Prathan Sridanusil SDB (born February 9, 1946, Thai: โยเซฟ ประธาน ศรีดารุณศีล) is a Thai prelate of the Catholic Church who served as bishop of Surat Thani in Thailand from 2004 to 2024.

Born in Wat Phleng, Ratchaburi Province, on February 9, 1946, he joined the order of the Salesians of Don Bosco in Hua Hin in 1964. He studied philosophy in Hong Kong and theology in Bethlehem. On June 29, 1975, he was ordained to the priesthood by Pope Paul VI in Rome.

In the following years he had several posts in the Thai Catholic church, until he was appointed to be the bishop of Surat Thani on October 9, 2004. He was installed as bishop on November 28 by Crescenzio Sepe, Cardinal Prefect of the Congregation for the Evangelization of Peoples.

Pope Francis accepted his resignation on July 8, 2024.

== Coat of arms ==
The shield of the bishopric coat of arms consists of three symbols. The golden color represents the faith. The monstrance with the host in the middle of the shield symbolizes the central standing of Jesus Christ. The star in the top left corner stands for Mother Mary. The book to the right is the holy bible, the inspiration for live and work. The motto below Fiat voluntas tua (Thy Will be done) is the fourth line of the Lord's Prayer.

Preceded by Michael Praphon Chaicharoen	Bishop of Surat Thani; 2005–2024	Succeeded by Paul Trairong Multree
