= Jorge Manuel López =

- Archbishop of Rosario
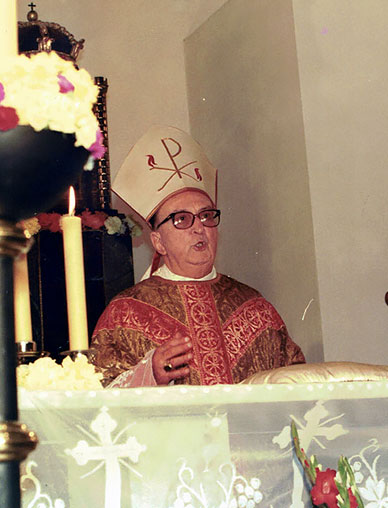
- Church: Catholic Church
- Archdiocese: Archdiocese of Rosario
- In office: 19 January 1983 – 20 November 1993
- Predecessor: Guillermo Bolatti
- Successor: Eduardo Mirás
- Previous posts: Archbishop of Corrientes (1972-1983); Titular Bishop of Ausafa (1968-1972); Auxiliary Bishop of Rosario (1968-1972)

Orders
- Ordination: 19 December 1942 by Antonio Caggiano
- Consecration: 15 August 1968 by Guillermo Bolatti

Personal details
- Born: 5 June 1918 Rosario, Santa Fe Province, Argentina
- Died: 22 December 2006 (aged 88) Rosario, Santa Fe Province, Argentina

Jorge Manuel López (5 June 1918 – 22 December 2006) was a bishop. He was born in Rosario, Santa Fe Province, where he was ordained priest in 1942. He was appointed auxiliary bishop in the city's diocese on 20 May 1968. He then led the Archdiocese of Corrientes, starting on 5 April 1972, and was appointed Archbishop of Rosario on 19 January 1983, where he served for ten years. He retired from this post upon reaching the age of 75, on 20 November 1993.

López was the vice-president of the Argentine Episcopal Conference and served in several episcopal commissions, even after his retirement. He presided the Episcopal Council for the Causes of Saints until November 2005. He died in 2006 at the age of 88, in the residence of the Sisters Servants of Jesus in Rosario.

| Preceded by Guillermo Bolatti | Archbishop of Rosario; 1983–1993 | Succeeded by Eduardo Mirás |
