= Archdiocese of Santa Fe de la Vera Cruz =

Archdiocese in Argentina

Coordinates: 31.6567°S 60.7107°W

Archdiocese of Santa Fe de la Vera Cruz Archidioecesis Sanctae Fidei Verae Crucis Arquidiócesis de Santa Fe de la Vera Cruz

Catholic
- Cathedral of All Saints

Location
- Country: Argentina
- Ecclesiastical province: Santa Fe de la Vera Cruz

Statistics
- Area: 30,701 km^{2} (11,854 sq mi)
- Population: Total; Catholics: (as of 2010); 960,000; 840,000 (87.5%)
- Parishes: 91

Information
- Denomination: Catholic Church
- Sui iuris church: Latin Church
- Rite: Roman Rite
- Established: 15 February 1897 (129 years ago)
- Cathedral: Cathedral of All Saints in Santa Fe
- Patron saint: Our lady of Guadalupe; Saint Joseph

Current leadership
- Pope: Leo XIV
- Metropolitan Archbishop: Sergio Alfredo Fenoy
- Auxiliary Bishops: Matías Vecino (elected)
- Bishops emeritus: José Maria Arancedo

Map

Website
- www.arquisantafe.org.ar

The Archdiocese of Santa Fe de la Vera Cruz (Latin: Archidioecesis Sanctae Fidei Verae Crucis is a Latin Church ecclesiastical jurisdiction or archdiocese of the Catholic Church in Argentina. As metropolitan see, there are two suffragan sees in its ecclesiastical province: Rafaela and Reconquista.

== History ==
On 15 February 1897 Pope Leo XII founded the Diocese of Santa Fe from territory taken from the Diocese of Paraná. On 20 April 1934 the diocese was elevated to an archdiocese by Pope Pius XI. On the same date it lost territory to create the dioceses of Diocese of Mendoza. It lost further territory when the dioceses of Resistencia (1939), Reconquista (1957) and Rafaela (1961) were created. Blessed John Paul II changed the name of the archdiocese to the Archdiocese of Santa Fe de la Vera Cruz on 19 September 1992. The archdiocese has also had a history of sex abuse allegations, with former Archbishop Edgardo Gabriel Storni found guilty and bishop Sergio Fenoy being criminally charged in July 2020 for attempting to supplant an investigation.

== Bishops ==
=== Ordinaries ===
- Juan Agustín Boneo (1898–1932)
- Nicolás Fasolino (1932–1969) (Cardinal from 1967)
- Vicente Faustino Zazpe (1969–1984)
- Edgardo Gabriel Storni (1984–2002)
- José María Arancedo (2003–2018)
- Sergio Alfredo Fenoy (2018–present)

=== Coadjutor archbishop ===
- Vicente Faustino Zazpe (1968–1969)

=== Auxiliary bishops ===
- Rafael Canale Oberti (1921–1956)
- Nicolás de Carlo (1936–1940), appointed Bishop of Resistencia
- Manuel Marengo (bishop) (1950–1956), appointed Bishop of Azul
- Enrique Principe (1957–1974)
- Edgardo Gabriel Storni (1977–1984), appointed Archbishop here
- Matías Vecino (since 2024)

=== Other priest of this diocese who became bishop ===
- Antonio Caggiano, appointed Bishop of Rosario in 1934 (Cardinal in 1946)

== Territorial losses ==
| Year | Along with | To form |
|---|---|---|
| 1934 | | Diocese of Rosario |
| 1939 | | Diocese of Resistencia |
| 1957 | | Diocese of Reconquista |
| 1961 | | Diocese of Rafaela |
