= Juan Alberto Puiggari =

Argentine archbishop (born 1949)

The Most Reverend Juan Alberto Puiggari
- Archbishop of Paraná
- Church: Roman Catholic Church
- Archdiocese: Paraná
- See: Paraná
- Appointed: 4 November 2010
- Installed: 7 March 2011
- Predecessor: Mario Luis Bautista Maulión
- Previous posts: Titular Bishop of Turuzi (1998-2003); Auxiliary Bishop of Paraná (1998-2003); Bishop of Mar del Plata (2003-10)

Orders
- Ordination: 13 November 1976 by Adolfo Tortolo
- Consecration: 8 May 1998 by Estanislao Esteban Karlic

Personal details
- Born: Juan Alberto Puiggari; 21 November 1949 (age 76) Buenos Aires, Argentina
- Education: Pontifical Catholic University of Argentina
- Motto: Instaturare Omnia in Christo ("Restore all things in Christ")
- Coat of arms

Juan Alberto Puiggari (born 21 November 1949) is an Argentinian clergyman. He has been the Roman Catholic Archbishop of Paraná since 2010.

== Biography ==
Puiggari was born in Buenos Aires, Argentina. He was ordained as a priest on 13 November 1976. On 20 February 1998, Pope John Paul II appointed him as titular bishop of Turuzi and auxiliary bishop of Paraná. Later, on 7 June 2003, Pope John Paul II appointed him as Bishop of Mar del Plata. He received his current appointment as Archbishop of Paraná by Pope Benedict XVI on 4 November 2010.
