= Roman Catholic Archdiocese of Rosario =

Catholic ecclesiastical territory

Coordinates: 32.9475°S 60.6323°W

Archdiocese of Rosario Archidioecesis Rosariensis Arquidiócesis de Rosario

Catholic
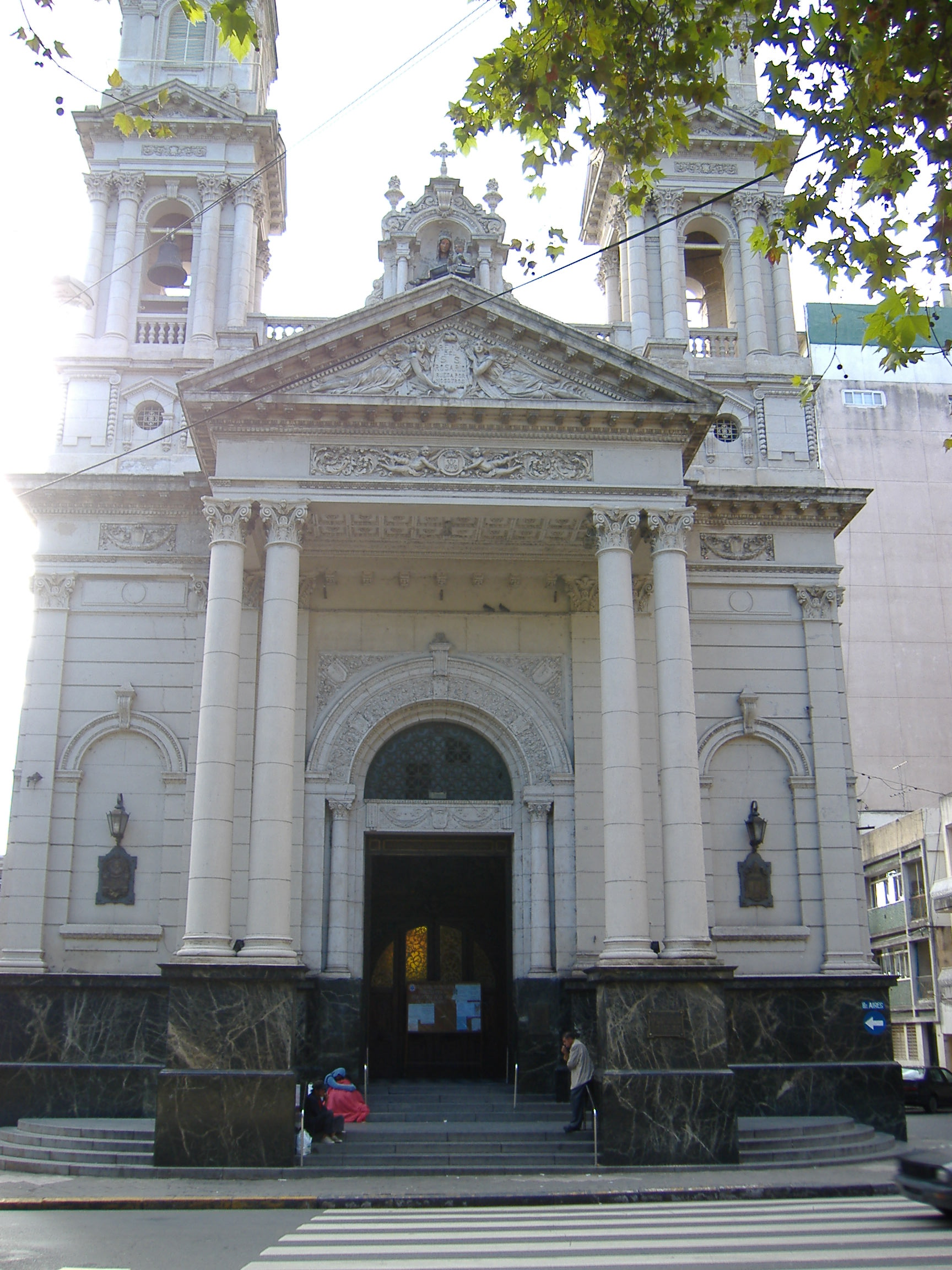
- Cathedral Basilica of Our Lady of the Rosary

Location
- Country: Argentina
- Ecclesiastical province: Rosario

Statistics
- Area: 13,500 km^{2} (5,200 sq mi)
- Population: Total; Catholics: (as of 2010); 1,854,000; 1,647,000 (88.8%)
- Parishes: 121

Information
- Denomination: Catholic
- Sui iuris church: Latin Church
- Rite: Roman Rite
- Established: 20 April 1934 (92 years ago)
- Cathedral: Cathedral Basilica of Our Lady of the Rosary
- Patron saint: Our Lady of the Rosary

Current leadership
- Pope: Leo XIV
- Archbishop: Eduardo Eliseo Martín
- Auxiliary Bishops: Ernesto José Fernández

Website
- delrosario.org.ar

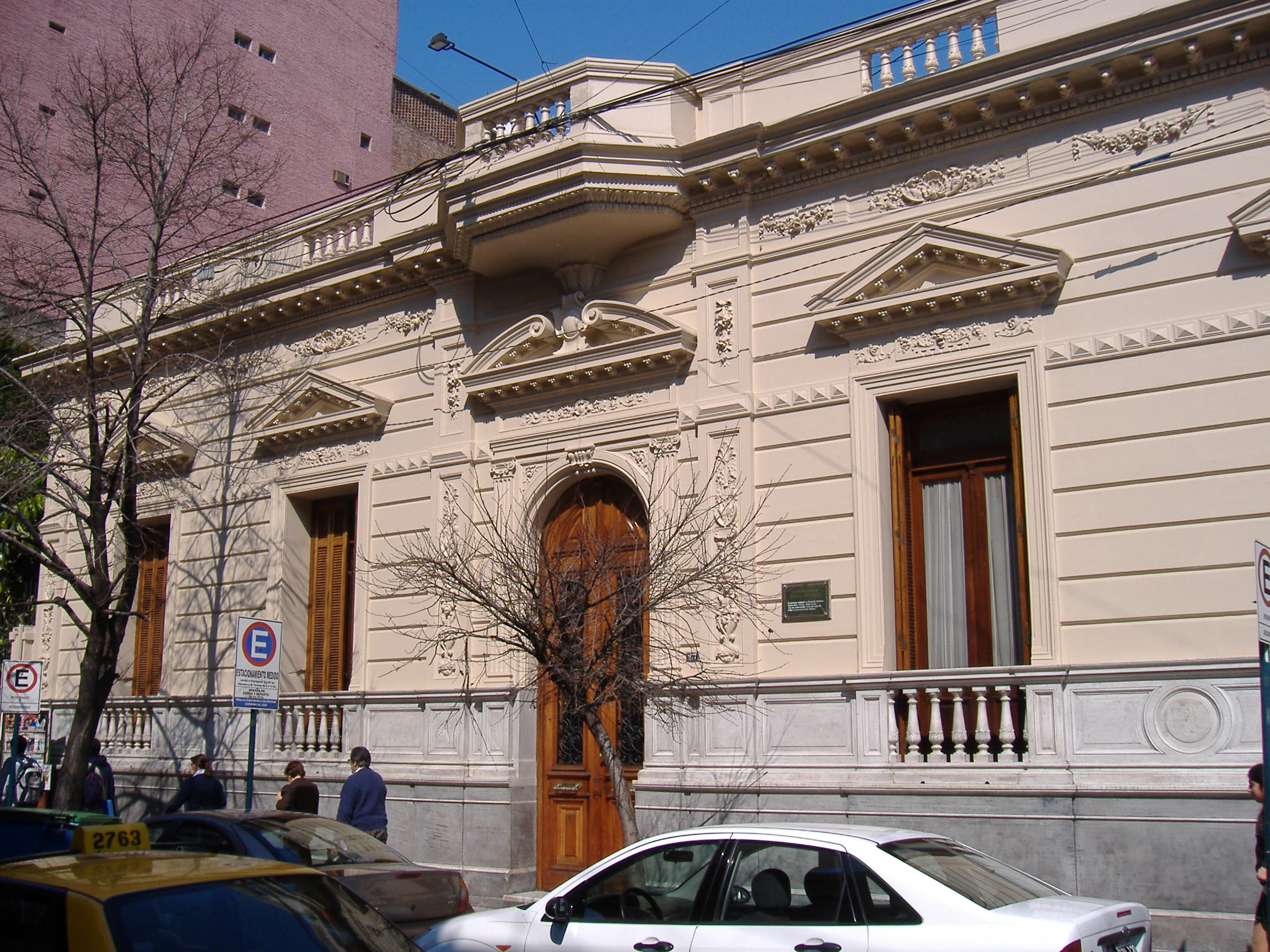
Seat of the Archbishopric, on Córdoba St.

The Archdiocese of Rosario (Latin: Archidioecesis Rosariensis) is an ecclesiastical territory or diocese of the Catholic Church in the southern part of the province of Santa Fe, Argentina, with its mother church, the Basilica Cathedral of Our Lady of the Rosary, located in the city of Rosario. Eduardo Eliseo Martín has served as Archbishop since 2014. Sergio Fenoy served as Auxiliary Bishop until he was appointed Bishop of San Miguel on 5 December 2006. The former archbishop Eduardo Mirás served as Apostolic Administrator of the Archdiocese between 22 December 2005 and 18 March 2006, when José Luis Mollaghan was installed.

The Archdiocese has an area of 13,500 km^{2} and a population of around 1,700,000, with 121 parishes. Its ecclesiastical province includes the departments of Belgrano, General López, Iriondo, Rosario and San Lorenzo, plus almost the whole departments of Caseros and Constitución. It has two suffragan bishops, corresponding to the dioceses of San Nicolás de los Arroyos and Venado Tuerto.

== History ==
The diocese was created by Pope Pius XI through the bull Nobilis Argentinae Nationis Ecclesia on 20 April 1934, along with nine others, citing a lack of sufficient episcopal sees to attend to the population. The first bishop was Antonio Caggiano, who was elevated to the episcopal dignity specifically for this post; at the time he was the General Counselor of the Argentine Catholic Action.

Rosario was raised to archdiocese by Pope Paul VI on 12 August 1963. On 7 October 1966 (day of the Virgin of the Rosary), the pope named Rosario "City of Mary" and elevated the Cathedral to Basilica.

In July 2020, the president of the Rosario Bar Association filed criminal charges against two Argentine archbiships, including Eduardo Martín of Rosario, for attempting to subvert the proper legal channels by setting up an office to investigate sex abuse charges against clergy. This followed a motu proprio by Pope Francis that called for the establishment of such offices (called Vos estis lux mundi). The case was eventually dismissed.

In 2024, the Archbishop of Rosario prohibited a local Catholic faith healer, Leda Bergonzi, from practicing within the diocese. Among other things, he said that only ordained priests had the right to perform the laying on of hands. Known for her unconventional style and allegedly miraculous healing powers, Bergonzi has drawn tens of thousands of followers to gatherings in Rosario.

== Bishops ==
=== Ordinaries ===
- Antonio Caggiano (1935–1959), appointed Archbishop of Buenos Aires (Cardinal in 1946)
- Silvino Martínez (1959–1961)
- Guillermo Bolatti (1963–1982) — first Archbishop of this see
- Jorge Manuel López (1983–1993)
- Eduardo Mirás (1994–2005)
- José Luis Mollaghan (2006–2014), appointed Official of the Congregation for the Doctrine of the Faith
- Eduardo Eliseo Martín (2014–present)

=== Auxiliary bishops ===
- Carlos María Cafferata (1956-1961), appointed Bishop of San Luis
- Francisco Juan Vénnera (1956-1959), appointed Bishop of San Nicolás de los Arroyos
- Silvino Martínez (1959-1961), appointed Bishop of San Nicolás de los Arroyos and Rosario
- Benito Epifanio Rodríguez (1960-1976)
- Jorge Manuel López (1968-1972), appointed Archbishop here
- Desiderio Elso Collino (1972), appointed Bishop of Lomas de Zamora
- Atilano Vidal Núñez (1972-1985), appointed Bishop of Santa Rosa
- Heraldo Camilo A. Barotto (1973-1983)
- Oscar Félix Villena (1982-1994)
- Mario Luis Bautista Maulión (1986-1995), appointed Bishop of San Nicolás de los Arroyos
- Héctor Sabatino Cardelli (1995-1998), appointed Bishop of Concordia
- Sergio Alfredo Fenoy, (1999-2006), appointed Bishop of San Miguel
- Luis Armando Collazuol (1997-2004), appointed Bishop of Concordia

=== Another priest of this diocese who became bishop ===
- Damián Gustavo Nannini, appointed Bishop of San Miguel in 2018

== See also ==
- Catholic Church in Argentina
