= Diocese of Rafaela =

Catholic ecclesiastical territory

Diocese of Rafaela Dioecesis Raphaëliensis Diócesis de Rafaela

Catholic
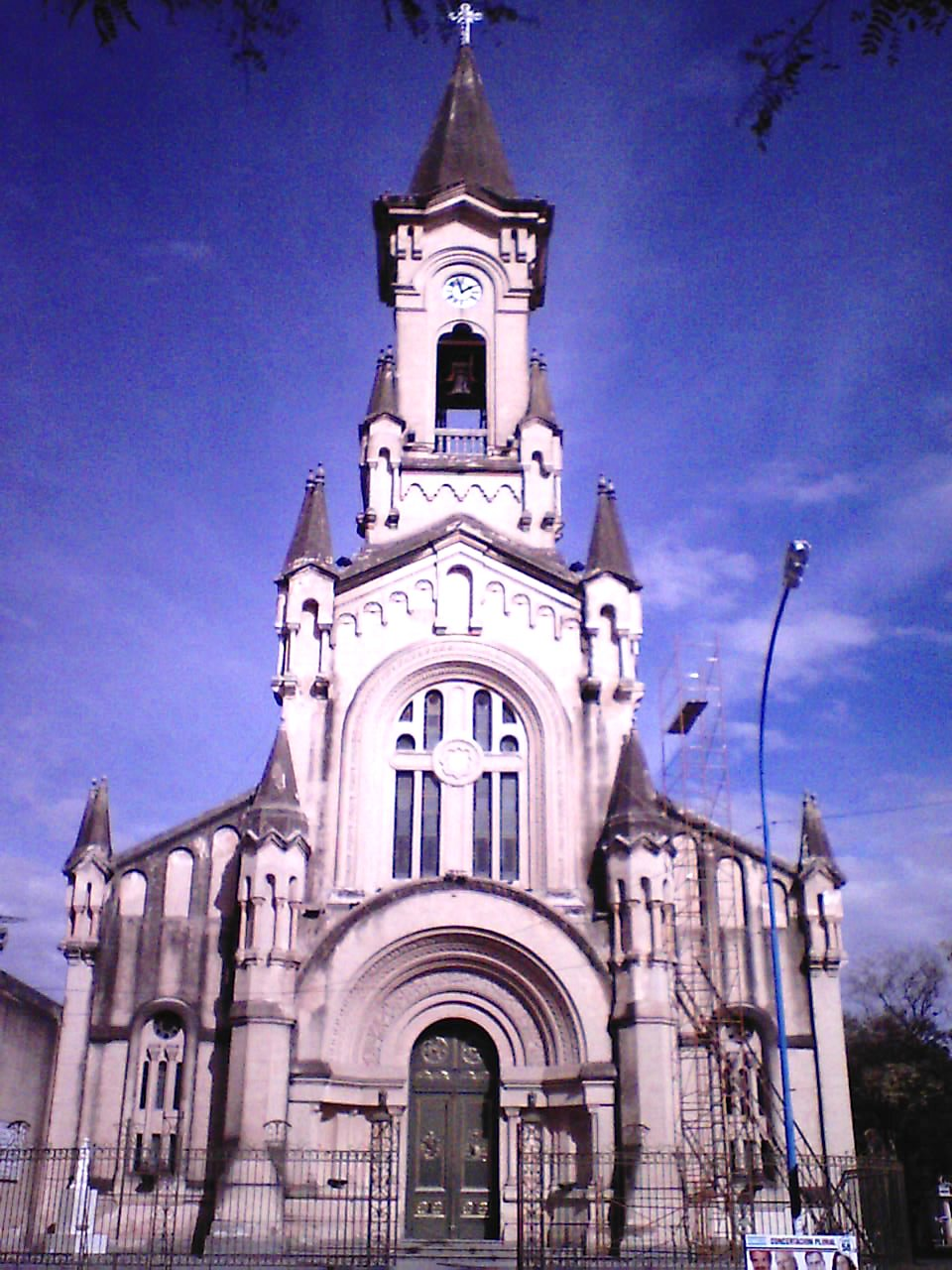
- Cathedral of St. Raphael

Location
- Country: Argentina
- Ecclesiastical province: Santa Fe de la Vera Cruz
- Metropolitan: Santa Fe de la Vera Cruz

Statistics
- Area: 38,320 km^{2} (14,800 sq mi)
- Population: Total; Catholics: (as of 2010); 277,540; 250,255 (80.2%)
- Parishes: 36

Information
- Denomination: Roman Catholic
- Rite: Roman Rite
- Established: 10 April 1961 (65 years ago)
- Cathedral: Cathedral of St Raphael in Rafaela
- Patron saint: Our Lady of Guadalupe; St Joseph the Worker

Current leadership
- Pope: Leo XIV
- Bishop: Pedro Javier Torres Aliaga
- Metropolitan Archbishop: José María Arancedo
- Bishops emeritus: Luis Alberto Fernández Alara

Website
- www.diocesisderafaela.org

The Roman Catholic Diocese of Rafaela (Latin: Dioecesis Raphaëliensis) is in Argentina and is a suffragan diocese of Santa Fe de la Vera Cruz.

== History ==
On 10 April 1961 Saint John XXIII founded the Diocese of Rafaela from territory taken from the Diocese of Reconquista and Archdiocese of Santa Fe.

== Bishops ==
=== Ordinaries ===
- Vicente Faustino Zazpe (1961–1968) Appointed, Coadjutor Archbishop of Santa Fe
- Antonio Alfredo Brasca (1968–1976)
- Alcides Jorge Pedro Casaretto (1976–1983) Appointed, Coadjutor Bishop of San Isidro
- Héctor Gabino Romero (1984–1999)
- Carlos María Franzini (2000–2012) Appointed, Archbishop of Mendoza
- Luis Alberto Fernández Alara (2013–2022)
- Pedro Javier Torres Aliaga (2022–present)

=== Other priests of this diocese who became bishops ===
- Hugo Norberto Santiago, appointed Bishop of Santo Tomé in 2006
- Gustavo Gabriel Zurbriggen, appointed Coadjutor Prelate of Deán Funes in 2011
- Gustavo Alejandro Montini, appointed Auxiliary Bishop of San Roque de Presidencia Roque Sáenz Peña in 2014
