= Archdiocese of Paraná =

Catholic ecclesiastical territory

Coordinates: 31.7333°S 60.5287°W

Metropolitan Archdiocese of Paraná Archidioecesis Metropolitae Paranensis Arquidiócesis Metropolitano de Paraná

Catholic
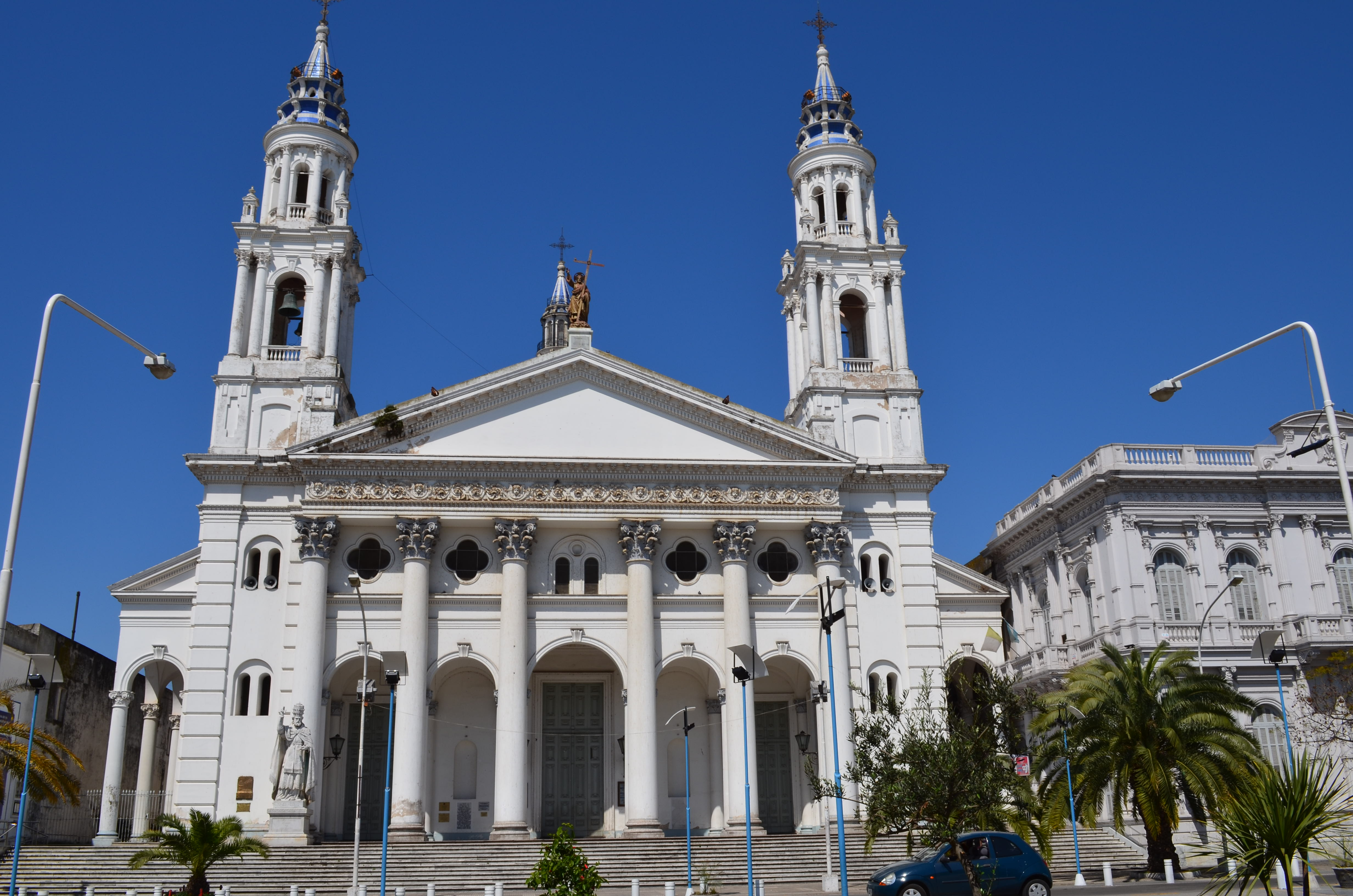
- Cathedral of Our Lady of the Rosary

Location
- Country: Argentina
- Ecclesiastical province: Paraná

Statistics
- Area: 30,348 km^{2} (11,717 sq mi)
- Population: Total; Catholics: (as of 2004); 502,500; 452,250 (90%)
- Parishes: 49

Information
- Denomination: Catholic Church
- Rite: Roman Rite
- Established: 13 June 1859 (167 years ago)
- Cathedral: Our Lady of the Rosary Cathedral in Paraná
- Patron saint: Our Lady of the Rosary

Current leadership
- Pope: Leo XIV
- Metropolitan Archbishop: Raúl Martín
- Bishops emeritus: Juan Alberto Puiggari

Website
- Website of the Archdiocese

The Roman Catholic Metropolitan Archdiocese of Paraná (Latin: Archidioecesis Metropolitae Paranensis) is a metropolitan diocese. Its suffragan sees include Concordia and Gualeguaychú.

== History ==
On 13 June 1859, Pope Pius IX established the Diocese of Paraná from the Diocese of Buenos Aires. It lost territory to the Diocese of Santa Fe when it was created in 1897 and the Diocese of Corrientes in 1910. The Diocese of Paraná was elevated to an archdiocese by Pope Pius XI on 20 April 1934. It lost territory two more times when the dioceses of Gualeguaychú (1957) and Concordia (1961) were created.

== Bishops ==
=== Ordinaries ===
- Luis José Gabriel Segura y Cubas (1859–1862)
- José María Gelabert y Crespo (1865–1897)
- Rudesindo de la Lastra y Gordillo (1898–1908)
- Abel Juan Bazán y Bustos (1910–1926)
- Julián Pedro Martínez (1927–1934)
- Zenobio Lorenzo Guilland (1934–1962)
- Adolfo Servando Tortolo (1962–1986)
- Estanislao Esteban Karlic (1986–2003); elevated to Cardinal in 2007
- Mario Luis Bautista Maulión (2003–2010)
- Juan Alberto Puiggari (2010–2025)
- Raúl Martín (2025–present)

=== Coadjutor archbishop ===
- Estanislao Esteban Karlic (1983-1986); future Cardinal

=== Auxiliary bishops ===
- Nicolás de Carlo (1918-1936), appointed Auxiliary Bishop of Santa Fe
- Adolfo Servando Tortolo (1956-1960), appointed Archbishop here
- Fortunato Antonio Rossi (1961-1963), appointed Bishop of Venado Tuerto
- José María Mestres (1974-1987)
- Juan Alberto Puiggari (1998-2003), appointed Archbishop here
- César Daniel Fernández (2007-2012), appointed Bishop of Jujuy

=== Another priest of this diocese who became bishop ===
- Ramón Alfredo Dus, appointed Auxiliary Bishop of Reconquista in 2005

== Territorial losses ==
| Year | Along with | To form |
|---|---|---|
| 1897 | | Diocese of Santa Fe |
| 1910 | | Diocese of Corrientes |
| 1957 | | Diocese of Gualeguaychú |
| 1961 | | Diocese of Concordia |
