= Paulino Reale Chirina =

- Prelate of Diocese of Venado Tuerto (emeritus)
- Church: Roman Catholic Church
- See: Roman Catholic Diocese of Venado Tuerto
- In office: 1989 - 2000
- Predecessor: Mario Picchi S.D.B.
- Successor: Gustavo Arturo Help
- Previous post(s): Priest

Orders
- Ordination: December 5, 1948

Personal details
- Born: January 25, 1924; Canicattini Bagni, Italy
- Died: 29 March 2012 (aged 88)

Paulino Reale Chirina (January 25, 1924 – March 29, 2012) was an Argentine Prelate of the Catholic Church.

He was born in Canicattini Bagni and was ordained a priest on December 5, 1948. Chirina was appointed bishop of the Diocese of Venado Tuerto on June 19, 1989 and ordained September 8, 1989. Chirina would retire from Venado Tuerto diocese on December 16, 2000.

== See also ==
- Diocese of Venado Tuerto
