= Estanislao Esteban Karlic =

Argentine cardinal (1926–2025)

His Eminence Estanislao Esteban Karlic
- Archbishop of Paraná
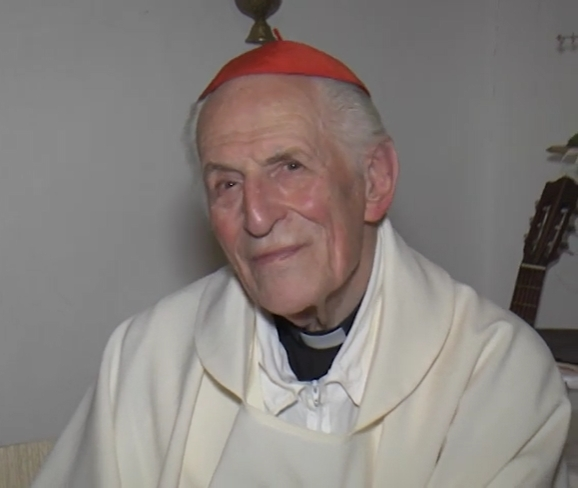
- Karlic in 2019
- Church: Roman Catholic Church
- Archdiocese: Paraná
- See: Paraná
- Appointed: 1 April 1986
- Term ended: 29 April 2003
- Predecessor: Adolfo Servando Tortolo
- Successor: Mario Luis Bautista Maulión
- Other post: Cardinal-Priest of Beata Maria Addolorata a piazza Buenos Aires (2007–2025)
- Previous posts: Titular Bishop of Castrum (1977–83); Auxiliary Bishop of Córdoba (1977–83); Coadjutor Archbishop of Paraná (1983–86); Apostolic Administrator sede plena of Paraná (1983–86); President of the Argentine Bishops' Conference (1996–2002)

Orders
- Ordination: 8 December 1954 by Zenobio Lorenzo Guilland
- Consecration: 15 August 1977 by Raúl Francisco Primatesta
- Created cardinal: 24 November 2007 by Pope Benedict XVI
- Rank: Cardinal-Priest

Personal details
- Born: Estanislao Esteban Karlic; 7 February 1926 Oliva, Córdoba, Argentina
- Died: 8 August 2025 (aged 99) Paraná, Entre Ríos, Argentina
- Education: Pontifical Gregorian University
- Coat of arms

Styles of Estanislao Esteban Karlic
- Reference style: His Eminence
- Spoken style: Your Eminence
- Informal style: Cardinal
- See: Paraná (emeritus)

Estanislao Esteban Karlic (Spanish: [estanizˈla.o esˈteβan kaɾˈlitʃ]; 7 February 1926 – 8 August 2025) was an Argentine cardinal of the Catholic Church. He served as Archbishop of Paraná from 1986 to 2003, and was elevated to the cardinalate in 2007.

== Biography ==
Estanislao Esteban Karlic was born in Oliva, Villa María, to immigrant Croatian parents, Juan Karlic (né Ivan Karlić) and Emilka Mavrić. He studied at the Major Seminary of Córdoba, and at the Pontifical Gregorian University in Rome, from where he obtained a licentiate in theology. Following his ordination to the priesthood on 8 December 1954, Karlic served as superior of the philosophy section of the Major Seminary of Córdoba, where he was also professor of theology.

On 6 June 1977, Karlic was appointed titular bishop of Castrum by Pope Paul VI. He received his episcopal consecration on the following 15 August from Cardinal Raúl Francisco Primatesta, with Bishops Alfredo Disandro and Cándido Rubiolo serving as co-consecrators. Karlic was later named Coadjutor Archbishop of and Apostolic Administrator of Paraná on 19 January 1983, eventually succeeding to the post of its Archbishop on 1 April 1986.

From 1986 to 1992, he was a member of the commission for the redaction of the new Catechism of the Catholic Church. In 1999, Karlic called for unity among the people of the Western Hemisphere and for the respect of small nations' cultures. He served as President of the Argentine Episcopal Conference for two successive terms (1996–1999, 1999–2002) before resigning as Paraná's archbishop on 29 April 2003, after seven years of service.

Pope Benedict XVI created him Cardinal-Priest of Beata Maria Vergine Addolorata a piazza Buenos Aires in the consistory of 24 November 2007. As he was beyond the age of 80 at the time of his elevation, Karlic was never eligible to participate in a papal conclave.

Cardinal Karlic was seen as theologically moderate and as a conciliator between conservative and liberal factions in the Argentine Church. He believed that "the family is the sanctuary of love and of life" and that "the human community is destined for fraternity". Cardinal Karlic celebrated his 45th episcopal anniversary on 15 August 2022 with a Mass of thanksgiving. The cardinal resided in the Benedictine Monastery of Our Lady of Paraná, in Aldea María Luisa.

Karlic died on 8 August 2025, at the age of 99; his health had been failing for some time.

Catholic Church titles
Preceded by Cándido Genaro Rubiolo	Auxiliary Bishop of Córdoba; 6 June 1977 – 19 January 1983	Succeeded by Elmer Osmar Ramón Miani
Preceded by Edgar Aristide Maranta	— TITULAR — Titular Bishop of Castro; 6 June 1977 – 19 January 1983	Succeeded by Juan Antonio Ugarte Pérez
Preceded by Adolfo Servando Tortolo	Archbishop of Paraná; 1 April 1986 – 29 April 2003	Succeeded by Mario Luis Bautista Maulión
Preceded by Antonio Quarracino	President of the Argentine Episcopal Conference; 1996 – 2002	Succeeded by Eduardo Vicente Mirás
Preceded by Raúl Francisco Primatesta	Cardinal-Priest of Beata Maria Addolorata a piazza Buenos Aires; 24 November 2007 – 8 August 2025	Vacant
Records
Preceded by Alexandre do Nascimento	Oldest living cardinal 28 September 2024 – 7 December 2024	Succeeded by Angelo Acerbi
