= List of Catholic dioceses in Argentina =

The Catholic Church in Argentina comprises fourteen ecclesiastical provinces each headed by a Metropolitan archbishop. The provinces are in turn subdivided into 48 dioceses and 14 archdioceses each headed by a bishop or an archbishop.

== Latin/rite-mixed Provinces and (Arch)Dioceses ==
=== Latin Exempt Jurisdictions ===
- Military Bishopric of Argentina (est.1957)

=== Ecclesiastical province of Bahía Blanca ===
- Metropolitan Archdiocese of Bahía Blanca (est. 1934)
  - Diocese of Alto Valle del Río Negro (est. 1993)
  - Diocese of Comodoro Rivadavia (est. 1957)
  - Diocese of Rawson (est. 2023)
  - Diocese of Río Gallegos (est. 1961)
  - Diocese of San Carlos de Bariloche (est. 1993)
  - Diocese of Santa Rosa (est. 1957)
  - Diocese of Viedma (est. 1934)
  - Territorial Prelature of Esquel (est. 2009)

=== Ecclesiastical province of Buenos Aires ===
- Metropolitan Archdiocese of Buenos Aires (est. 1620)
  - Diocese of Avellaneda-Lanús (est. 1961)
  - Diocese of Gregorio de Laferrère (est. 2000)
  - Diocese of Lomas de Zamora (est. 1957)
  - Diocese of Morón (est. 1957)
  - Diocese of Quilmes (est. 1976)
  - Maronite Eparchy of San Charbel en Buenos Aires (est. 1990)
  - Diocese of San Isidro (est. 1957)
  - Diocese of San Justo (est. 1969)
  - Diocese of San Martín (est. 1961)
  - Diocese of San Miguel (est. 1978)
  - Ukrainian Catholic Eparchy of Santa María del Patrocinio en Buenos Aires (est. 1978)

=== Ecclesiastical province of Córdoba ===
- Metropolitan Archdiocese of Córdoba (est. 1570 as Diocese of Tucumán)
  - Diocese of Cruz del Eje (est. 1963)
  - Diocese of Villa de la Concepción del Río Cuarto (est. 1934)
  - Diocese of San Francisco (est. 1963)
  - Diocese of Villa María (est. 1957)
  - Territorial Prelature of Deán Funes (est. 1980)

=== Ecclesiastical province of Corrientes ===
- Metropolitan Archdiocese of Corrientes (est. 1910)
  - Diocese of Goya (est. 1961)
  - Diocese of Oberá (est. 2009)
  - Diocese of Posadas (est. 1957)
  - Diocese of Puerto Iguazú (est. 1986)
  - Diocese of Santo Tomé (est. 1979)

=== Ecclesiastical province of La Plata ===
- Metropolitan Archdiocese of La Plata (est. 1897)
  - Diocese of Azul (est. 1934)
  - Diocese of Chascomús (est. 1980)
  - Diocese of Mar del Plata (est. 1957)

=== Ecclesiastical province of Mercedes–Luján ===
- Archdiocese of Mercedes–Luján (est. 1934)
  - Diocese of Merlo-Moreno (est. 1997)
  - Diocese of Nueve de Julio (est. 1957)
  - Diocese of Zárate-Campana (est. 1976)

=== Ecclesiastical province of Mendoza ===
- Metropolitan Archdiocese of Mendoza (est. 1934)
  - Diocese of Neuquén (est. 1961)
  - Diocese of San Rafael (est. 1961)

=== Ecclesiastical province of Paraná ===
- Metropolitan Archdiocese of Paraná (est. 1859)
  - Diocese of Concordia (est. 1961)
  - Diocese of Gualeguaychú (est. 1957)

=== Ecclesiastical province of Resistencia ===
- Metropolitan Archdiocese of Resistencia (est. 1939)
  - Diocese of Formosa (est. 1957)
  - Diocese of San Roque de Presidencia Roque Sáenz Peña (est. 1963)

=== Ecclesiastical province of Rosario ===
- Metropolitan Archdiocese of Rosario (est. 1934)
  - Diocese of San Nicolás de los Arroyos (est. 1947)
  - Diocese of Venado Tuerto (est. 1963)

=== Ecclesiastical province of Salta ===
- Metropolitan Archdiocese of Salta (est. 1806)
  - Diocese of Catamarca (est. 1910)
  - Diocese of Jujuy (est. 1934)
  - Diocese of Orán (est. 1961)
  - Territorial Prelature of Cafayate (est. 1969)
  - Territorial Prelature of Humahuaca (est. 1969)

=== Ecclesiastical province of San Juan de Cuyo ===
- Metropolitan Archdiocese of San Juan de Cuyo (est. 1826)
  - Diocese of La Rioja (est. 1934)
  - Diocese of San Luis (est. 1934)

=== Ecclesiastical province of Santa Fe de la Vera Cruz ===
- Metropolitan Archdiocese of Santa Fe de la Vera Cruz (est. 1897)
  - Diocese of Rafaela (est. 1961)
  - Diocese of Reconquista (est. 1957)

=== Ecclesiastical province of Tucumán ===
- Metropolitan Archdiocese of Tucumán (est. 1897)
  - Diocese of Añatuya (est. 1961)
  - Diocese of Concepción (est. 1963)
  - Archdiocese of Santiago del Estero (est. 1907)

== Eastern Catholic Sui iuris Jurisdictions ==
- Eparchy of San Gregorio de Narek en Buenos Aires
- Melkite Catholic Apostolic Exarchate of Argentina
- Ordinariate for Eastern Catholics in Argentina (other Eastern Catholic rites)

== Gallery of Archdioceses ==
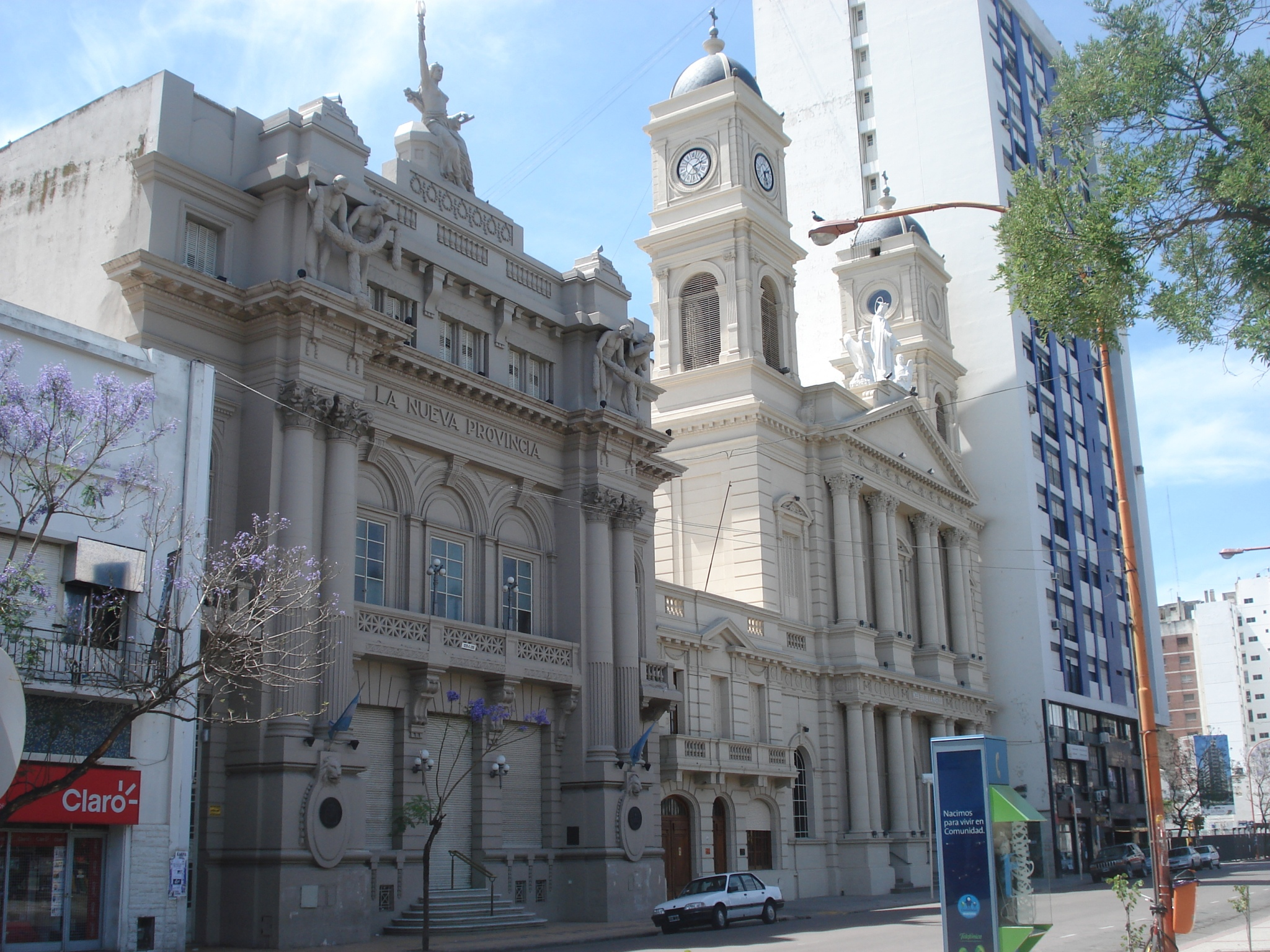
The seat of the Archdiocese of Bahía Blanca is Catedral Nuestra Señora de la Merced.

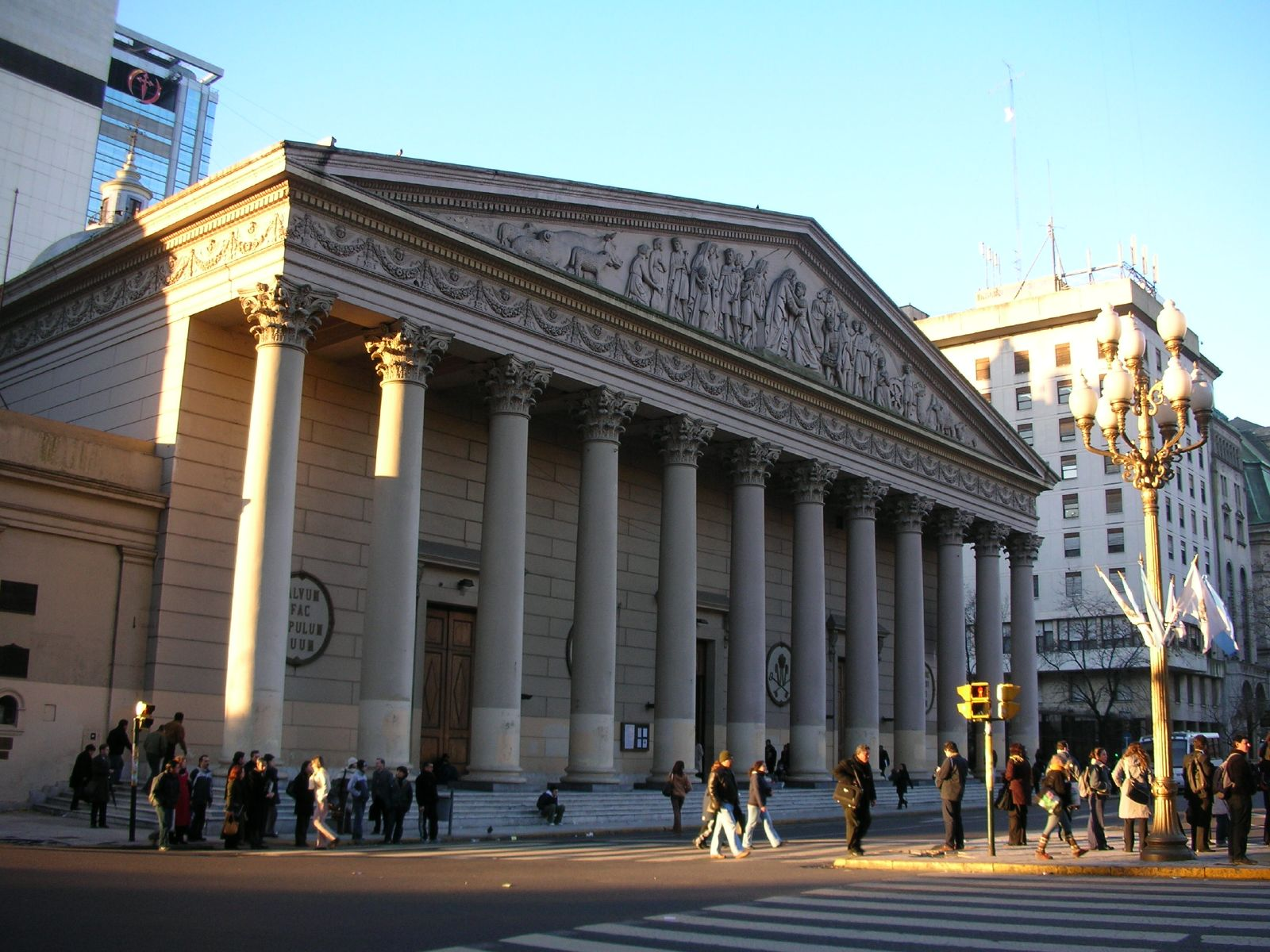
The seat of the Archdiocese of Buenos Aires is Catedral Metropolitana de Buenos Aires.

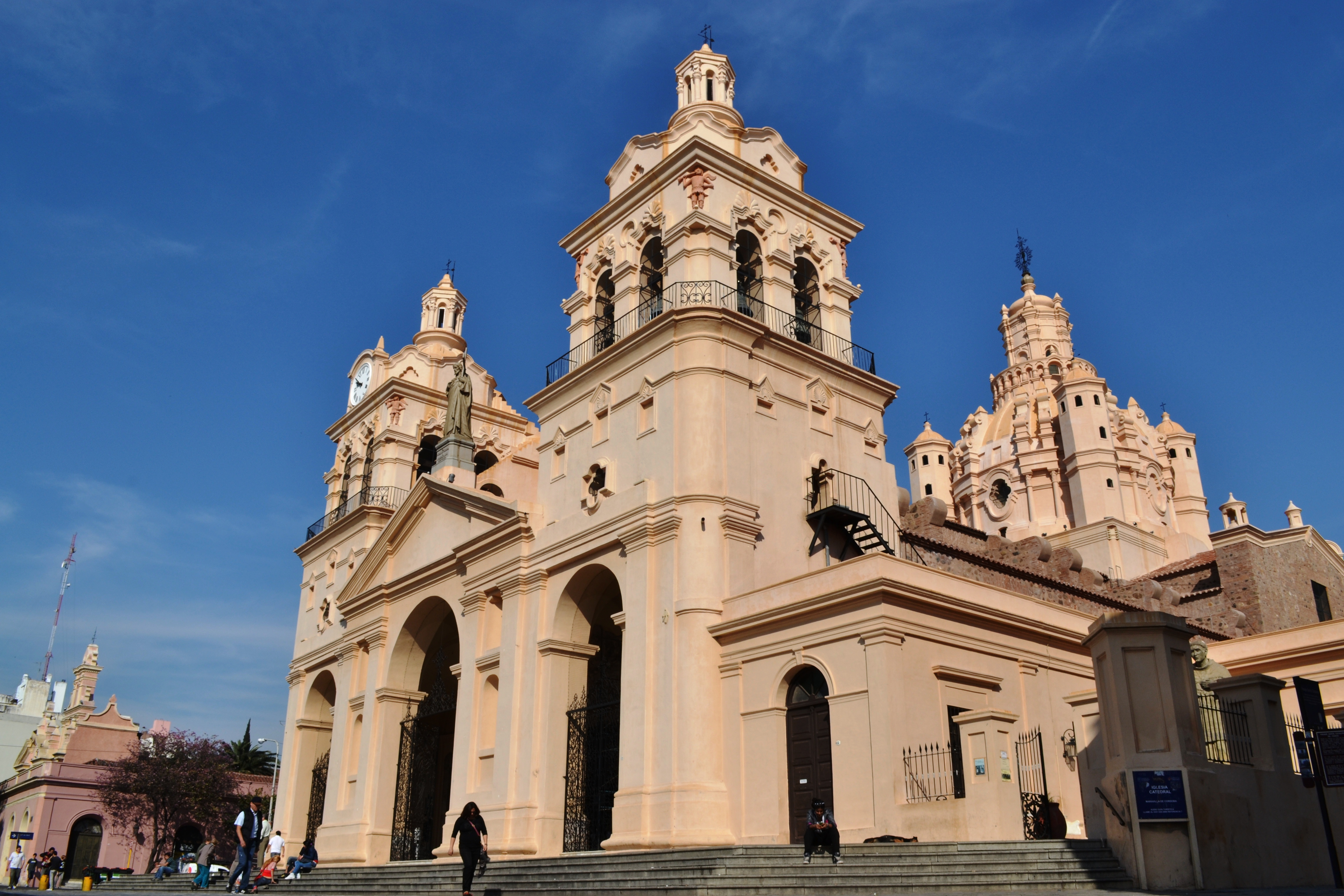
The seat of the Archdiocese of Córdoba is Catedral Nuestra Señora de la Asunción.

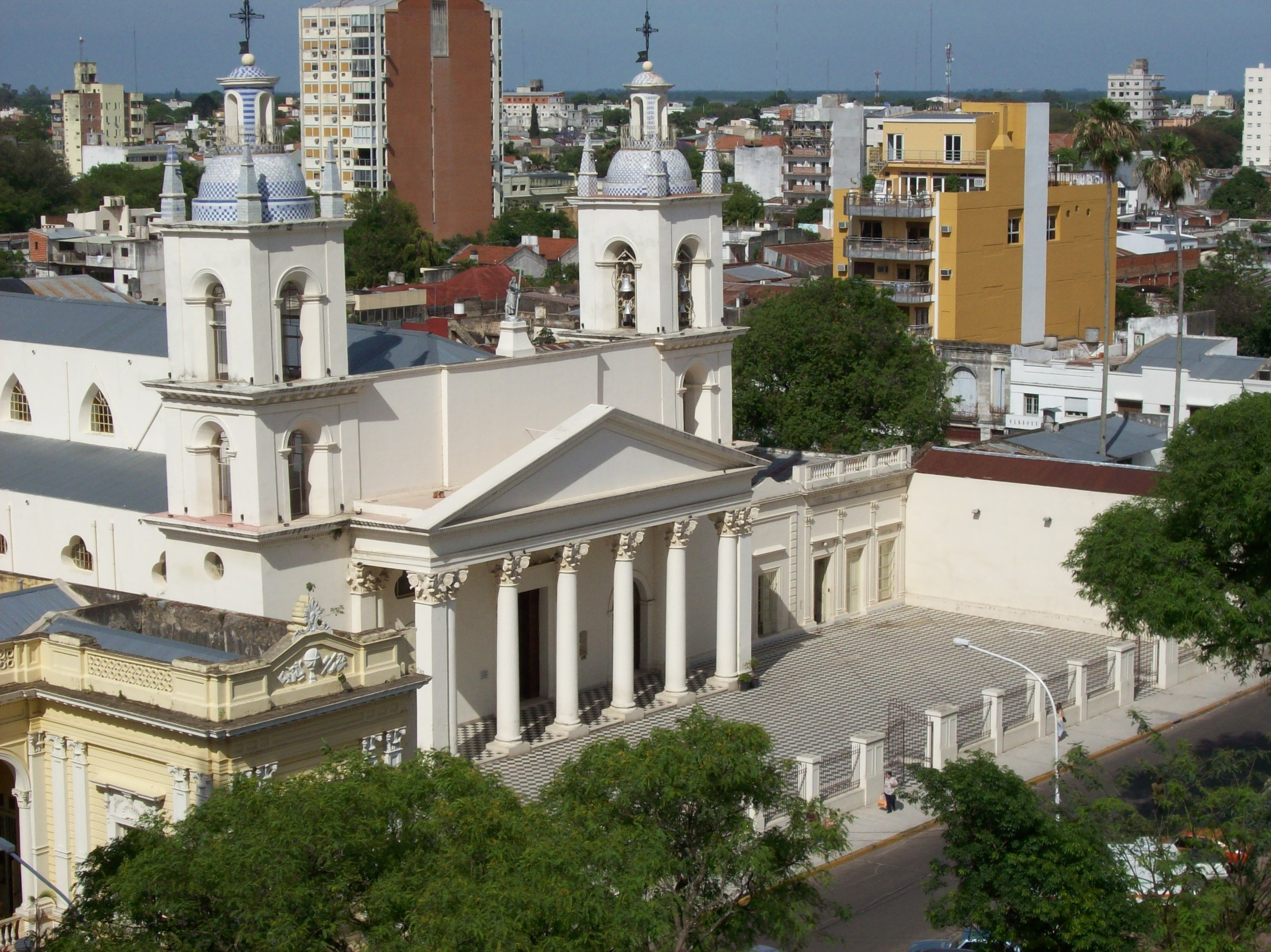
The seat of the Archdiocese of Corrientes is Catedral Nuestra Señora del Rosario.

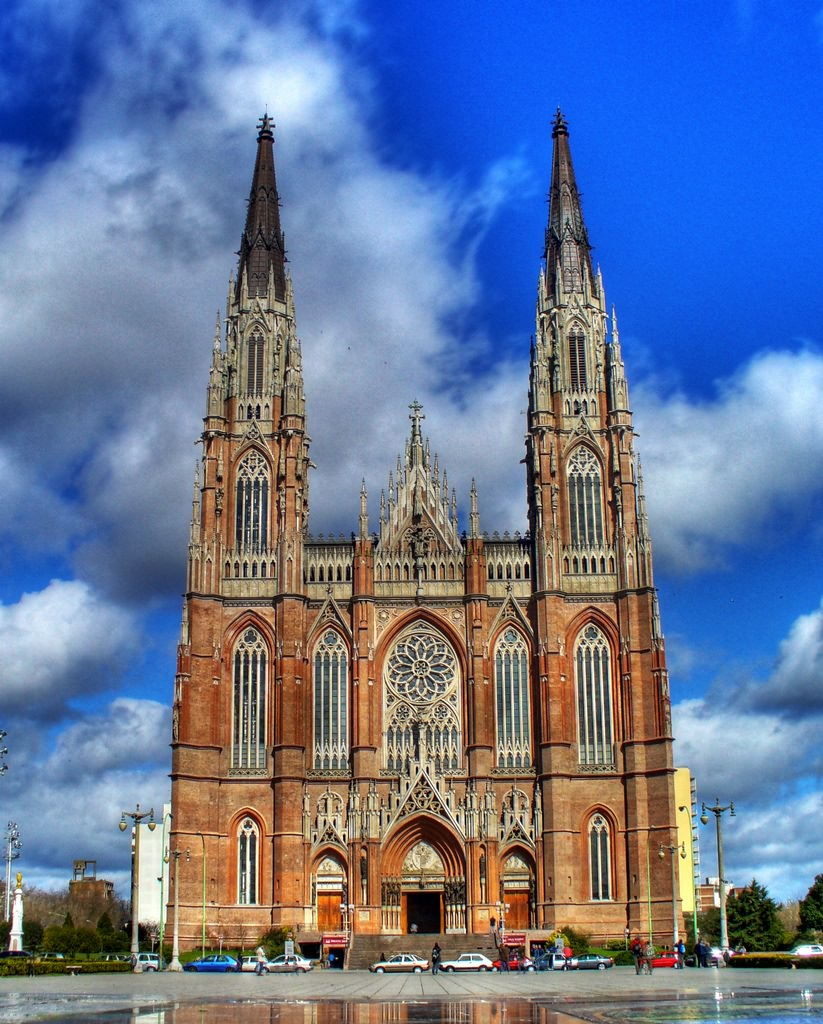
The seat of the Archdiocese of La Plata is Catedral Nuestra Señora de los Dolores .

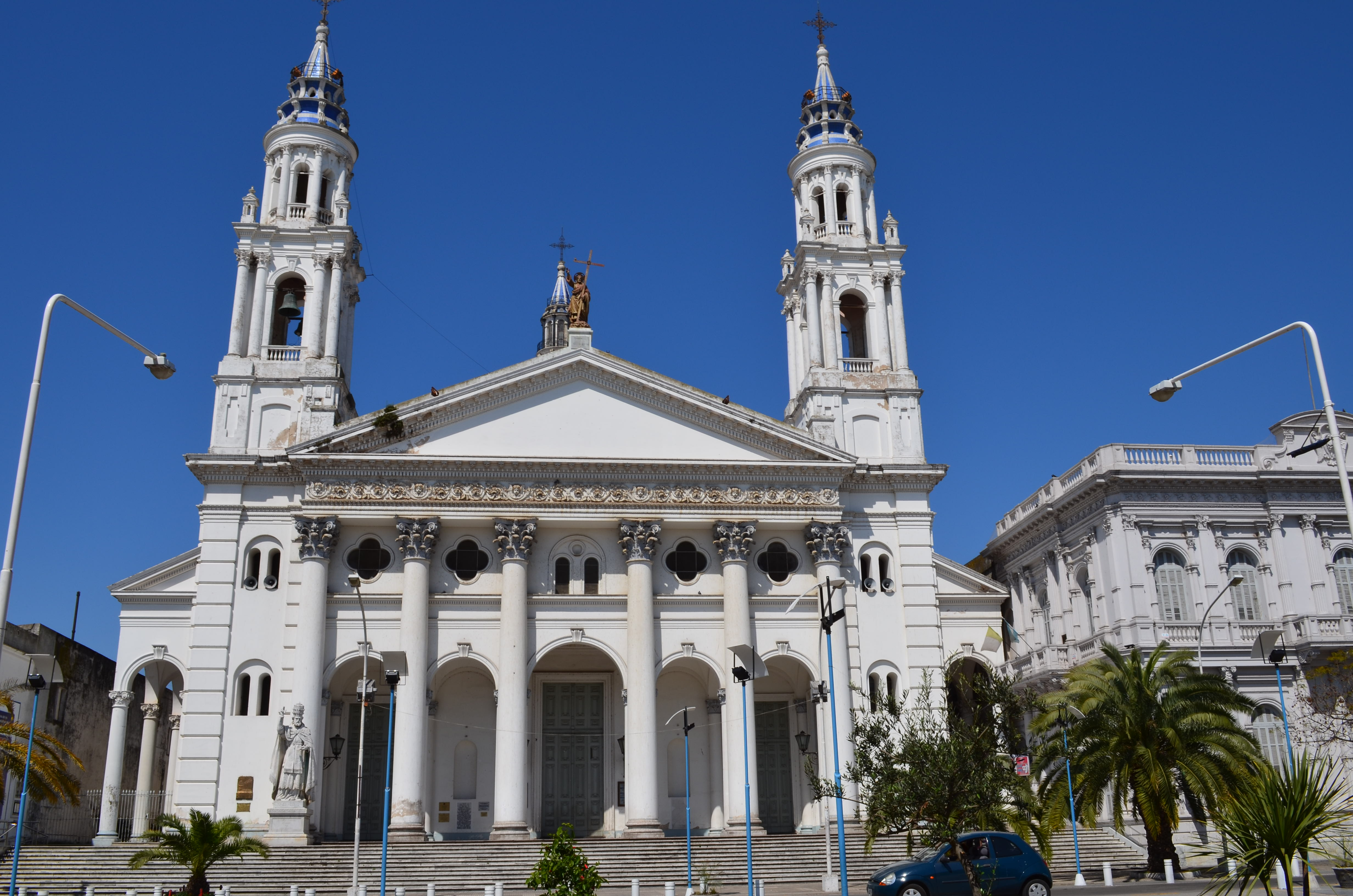
The seat of the Archdiocese of Paraná is Catedral Nuestra Señora del Rosario.

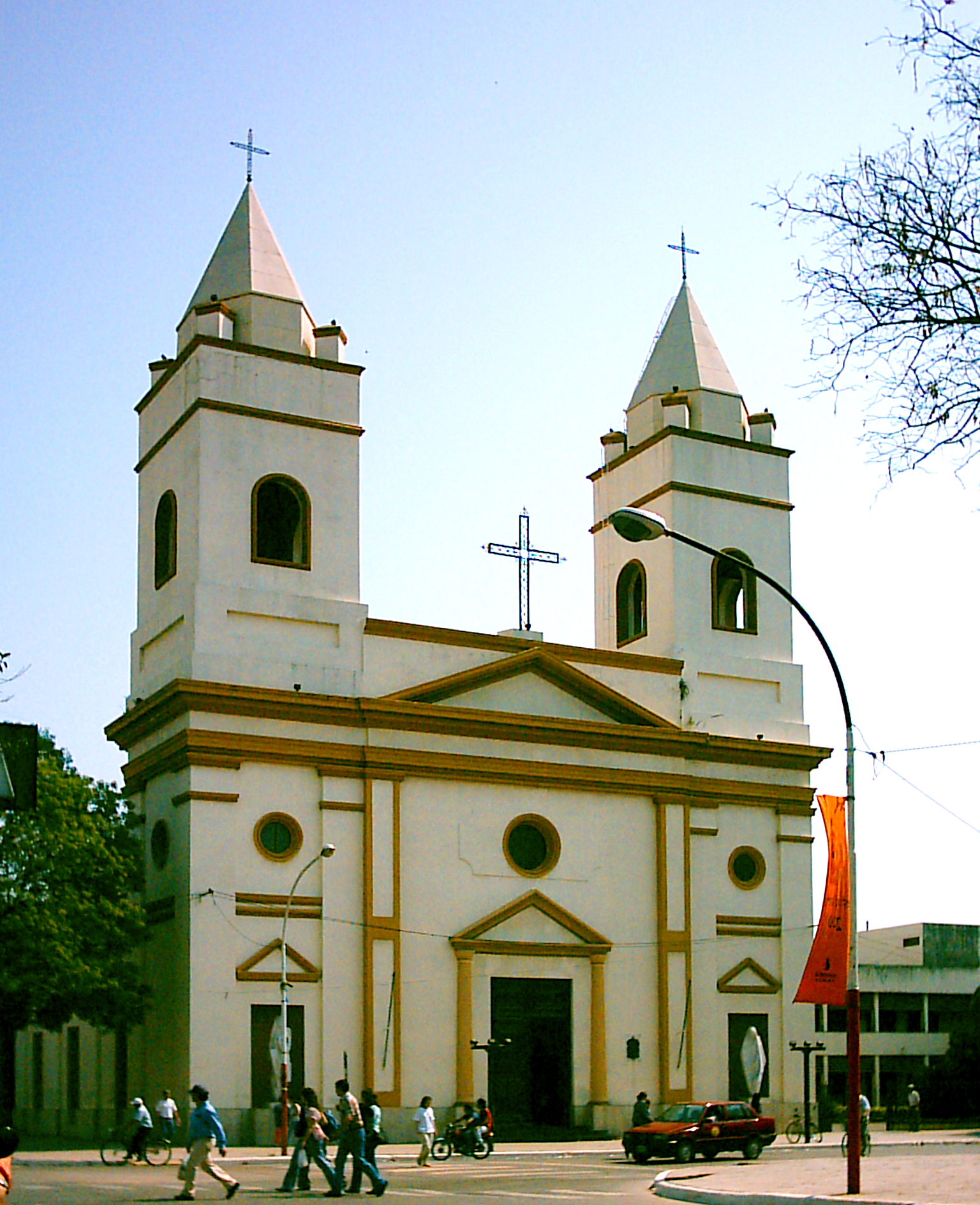
The seat of the Archdiocese of Resistencia is Catedral San Fernando Rey.

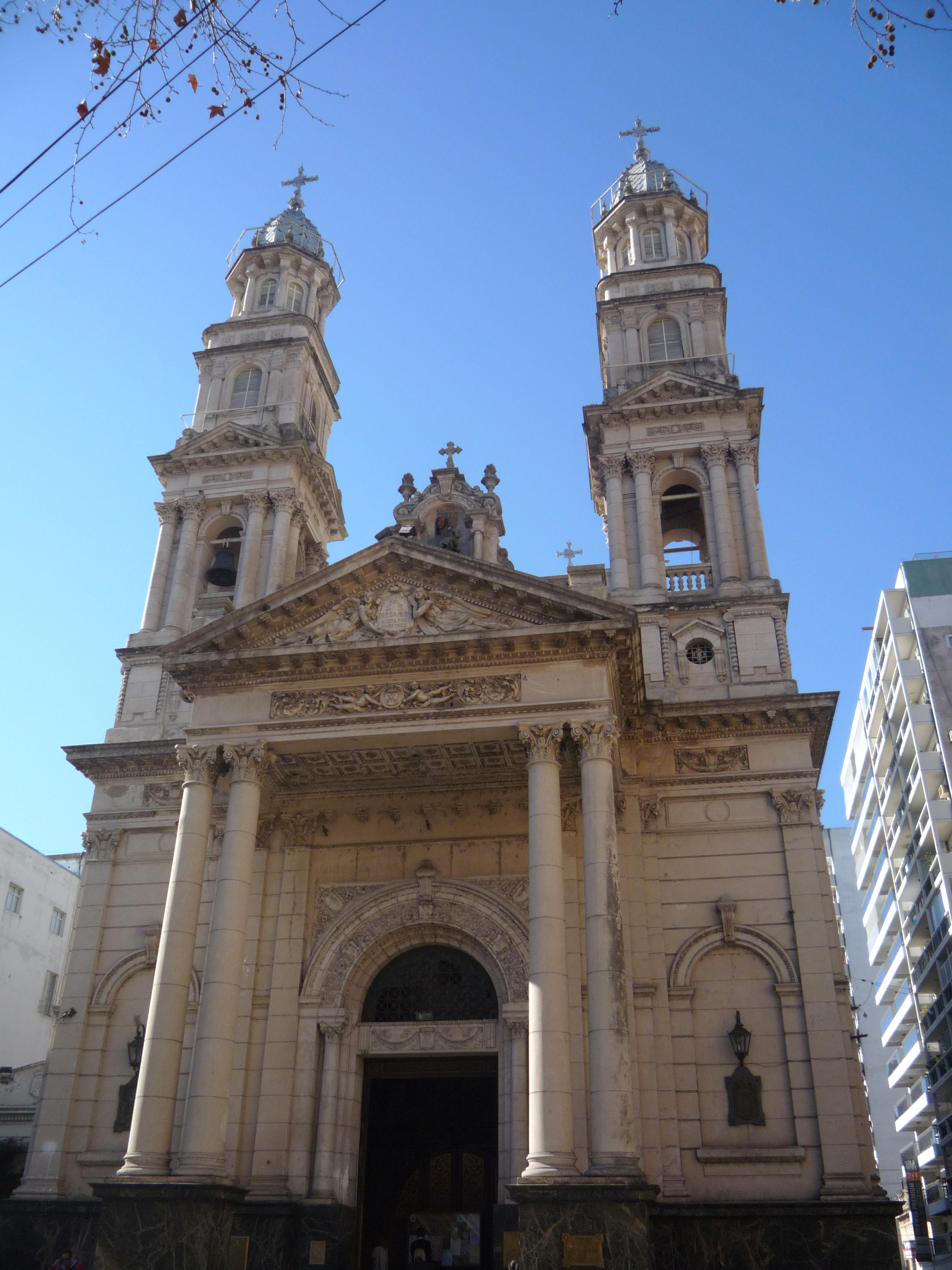
The seat of the Archdiocese of Rosario is Catedral Basílica de Nuestra Señora del Rosario .

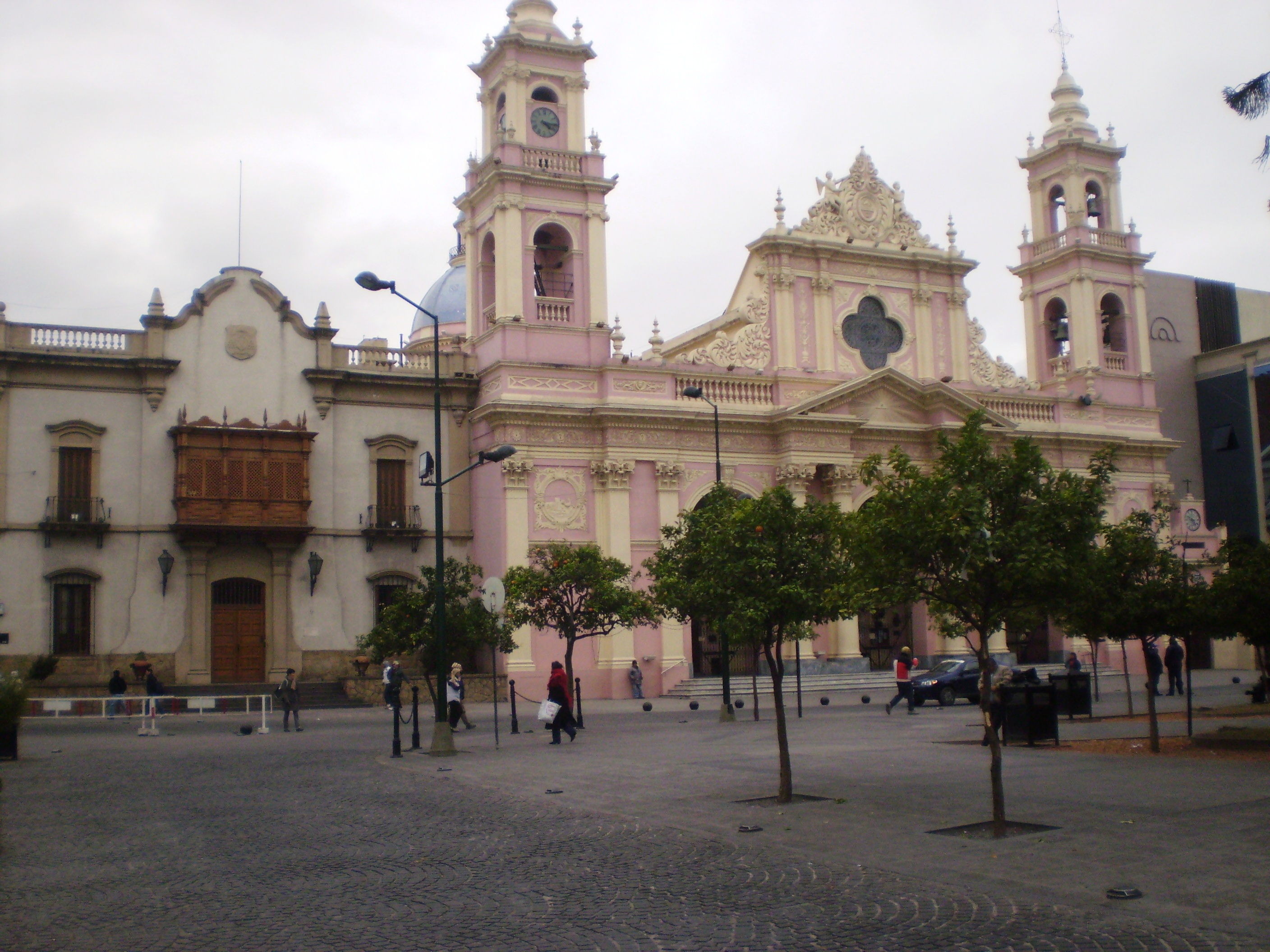
The seat of the Archdiocese of Salta is Catedral Santuario Nuestro Señor y la Virgen del Milagro.

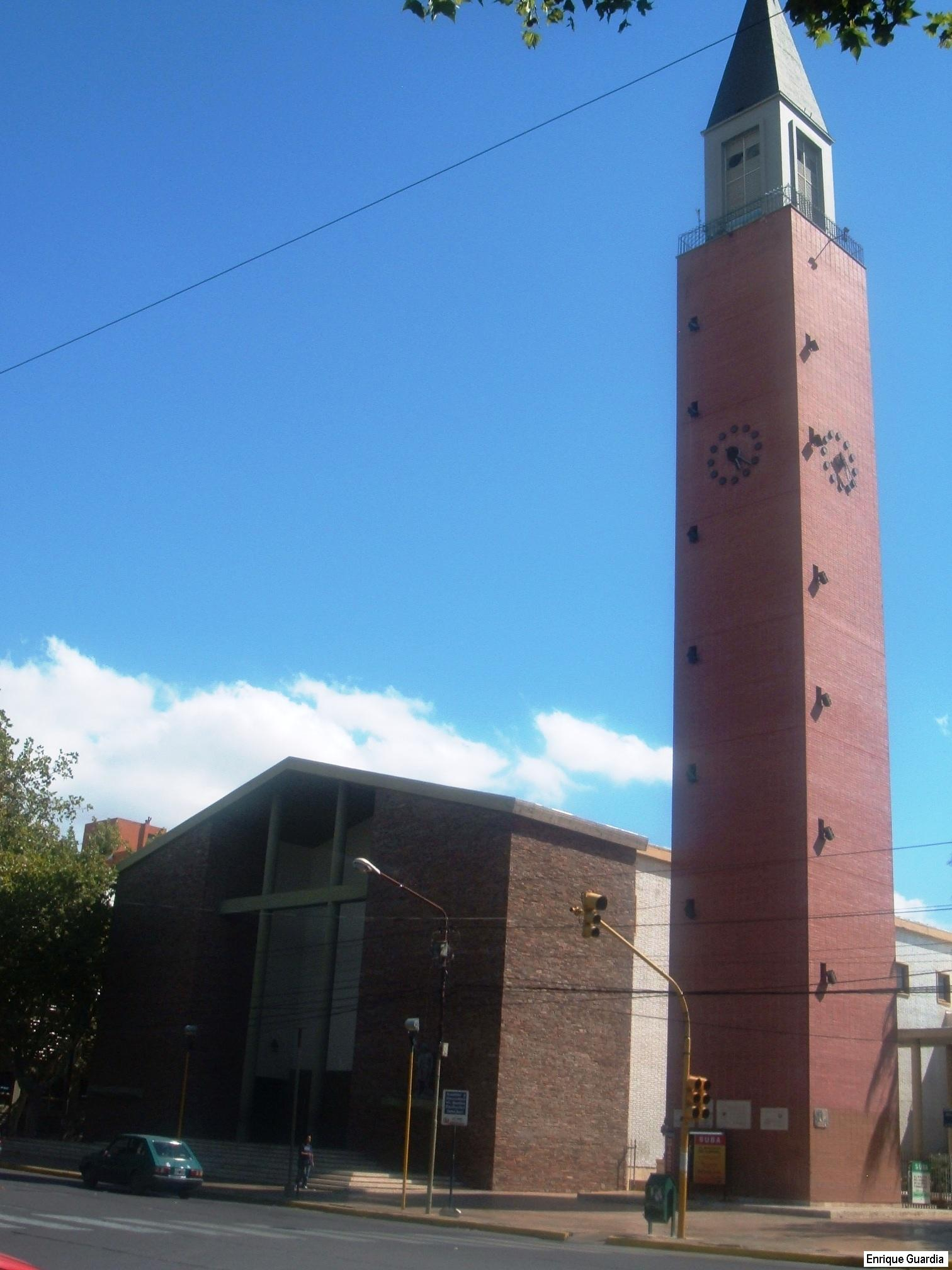
The seat of the Archdiocese of San Juan de Cuyo is Catedral San Juan Bautista.

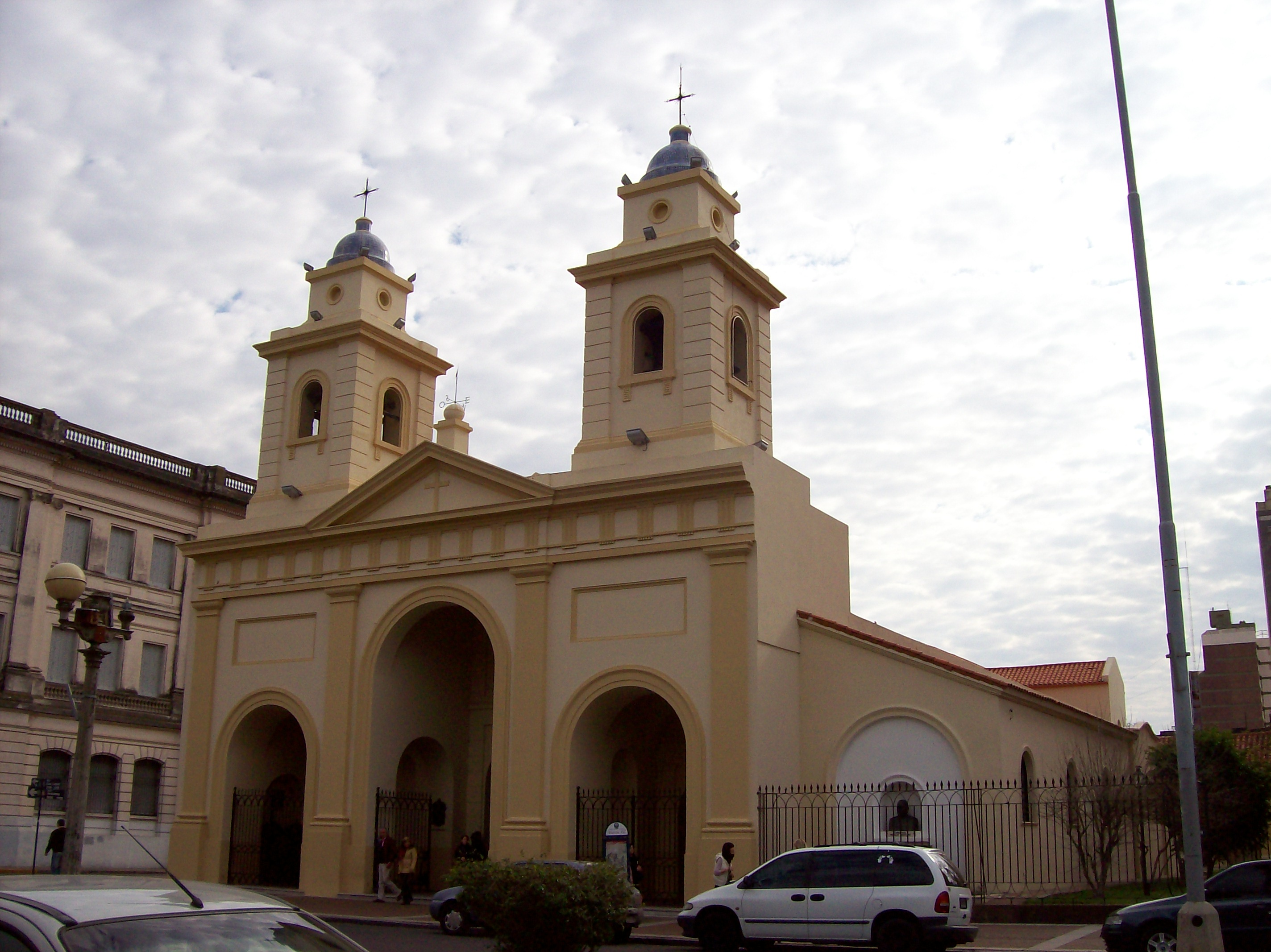
The seat of the Archdiocese of Santa Fe de la Vera Cruz is Catedral Metropolitana Todos los Santos.

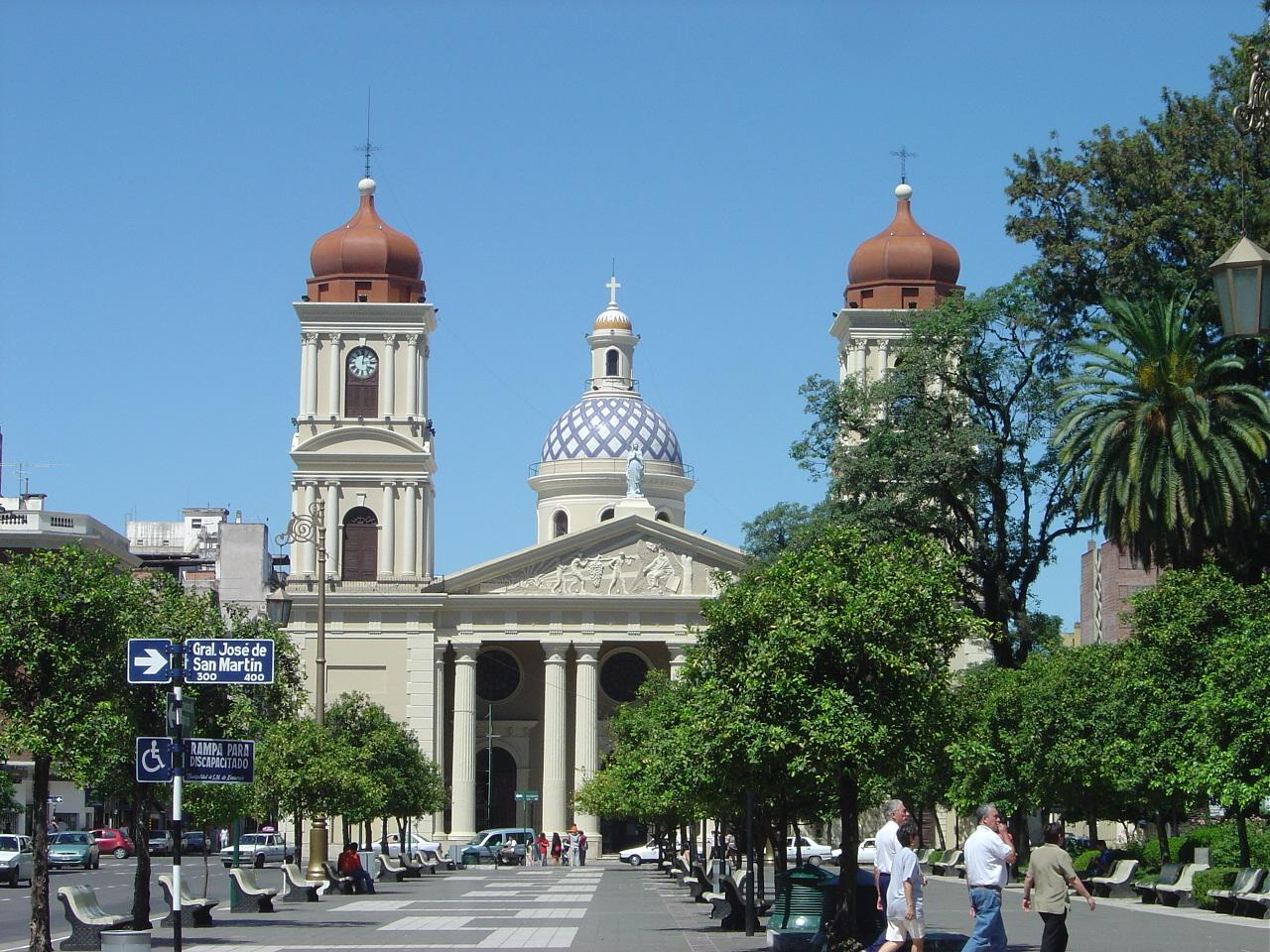
The seat of the Archdiocese of Tucumán is Catedral Nuestra Señora de la Encarnación.

== See also ==
- Catholicism in Argentina
- List of Catholic dioceses (structured view)
- List of Catholic dioceses (alphabetical)
