= Francisco Polti Santillán =

Argentine Roman Catholic prelate

- Bishop Emeritus of Santiago del Estero
- Church: Catholic Church
- Diocese: Diocese of Santiago del Estero
- In office: 17 May 2006 – 23 December 2013
- Predecessor: Juan Carlos Maccarone
- Successor: Vicente Bokalic Iglic
- Previous post: Bishop of Santo Tomé (1994-2006)

Orders
- Ordination: 11 August 1963
- Consecration: 22 August 1994 by Antonio Quarracino

Personal details
- Born: 17 November 1938 (age 87) Santiago del Estero, Santiago del Estero Province, Argentina

Francisco Polti Santillán (17 November 1938) is a prelate of the Roman Catholic Church. He served as bishop of Santo Tomé from 1994 until 2006, and as bishop of Santiago del Estero from 2006 until his retirement in 2013.

== Life ==
Born in Santiago del Estero, Polti Santillán became a member of Opus Dei. He was ordained to the priesthood on 11 August 1963.

On 13 July 1994 he was appointed bishop of Santo Tomé. Polti Santillán received his episcopal consecration on the following 22 August from Antonio Quarracino, archbishop of Buenos Aires, with archbishop of Santa Fe de la Vera Cruz, Edgardo Gabriel Storni, archbishop emeritus of Corrientes, Fortunato Antonio Rossi, archbishop of Corrientes, Domingo Salvador Castagna, and bishop of Posadas, Alfonso Delgado Evers, serving as co-consecrators. He was installed on the following 11 September.

On 17 May 2006 he was appointed bishop of Santiago del Estero, where he was installed on the following 22 July. He resigned on 23 December 2013, when he reached 75, the age of retirement for bishops.
