= Marcelo Martorell =

Argentinian priest (1945–2024)

His Excellency Marcelo Martorell
- Bishop Emeritus of Puerto Iguazú
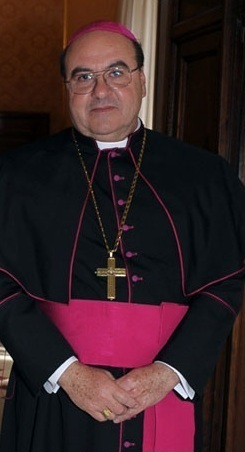
- Metropolis: Roman Catholic Archdiocese of Corrientes
- Appointed: 3 October 2006
- Term ended: 8 May 2020
- Predecessor: Joaquín Piña Batllevell
- Successor: Nicolás Baisi

Orders
- Ordination: 17 May 1970 by Pope Paul VI
- Consecration: 8 December 2006 by Adriano Bernardini

Personal details
- Born: Marcelo Raúl Martorell; 1 March 1945 Salta, Salta Province, Argentina
- Died: 16 June 2024 (aged 79) Salta, Salta Province, Argentina
- Motto: LOS AMÓ HASTA EL FIN
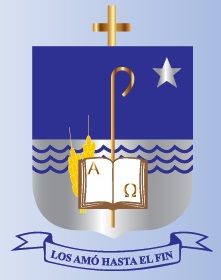
- Coat of arms

Styles of Marcelo Martorell
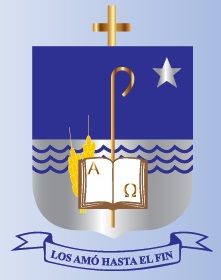
- Reference style: His Excellency; The Most Reverend
- Spoken style: Your Excellency
- Religious style: Bishop

Marcelo Raúl Martorell (1 March 1945 – 16 June 2024) was an Argentine Roman Catholic prelate. He was bishop of Puerto Iguazú from 2006 to 2020. He died in Salta, Salta Province on 16 June 2024, at the age of 79.

Catholic Church titles
Preceded by Joaquín Piña Batllevell	Bishop of Puerto Iguazú; 2006–2020	Succeeded by Nicolás Baisi
