= Roman Catholic Diocese of Santo Tomé =

Catholic ecclesiastical territory

Diocese of Santo Tomé Sancti Thomae in Argentina Diócesis de Santo Tomé

Catholic

Location
- Country: Argentina
- Ecclesiastical province: Corrientes
- Metropolitan: Corrientes

Statistics
- Area: 29,011 km^{2} (11,201 sq mi)
- Population: Total; Catholics: (as of 2010); 165,000; 150,000 (90.9%)
- Parishes: 13

Information
- Denomination: Roman Catholic
- Rite: Roman Rite
- Established: 3 July 1979 (40 years ago)
- Cathedral: Cathedral of the Immaculate Conception in Santo Tomé, Corrientes
- Patron saint: St Thomas Apostle

Current leadership
- Pope: Leo XIV
- Bishop: Gustavo Alejandro Montini
- Metropolitan Archbishop: Andrés Stanovnik

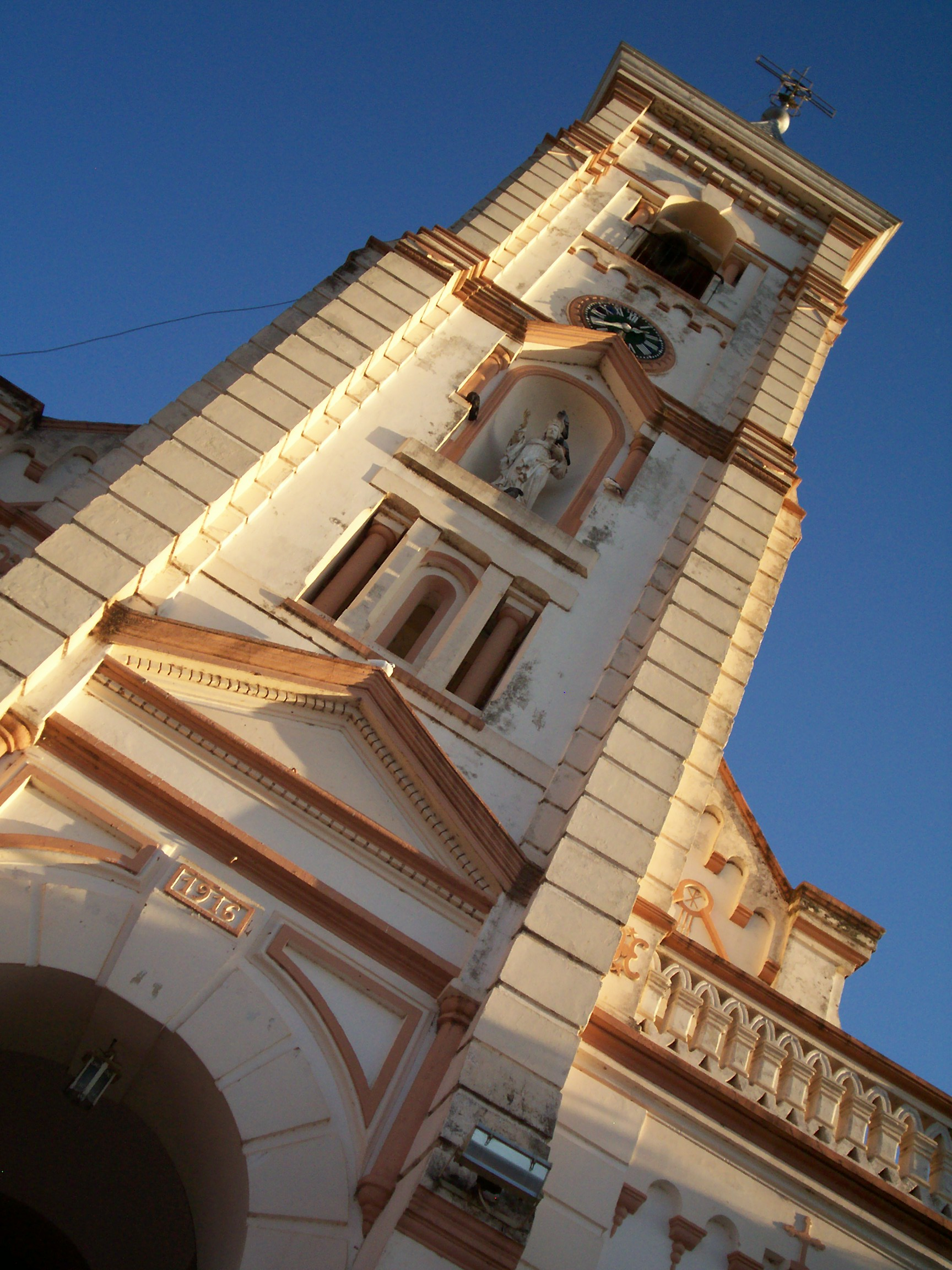
A picture of the Diocese

The Roman Catholic Diocese of Santo Tomé (Latin: Sancti Thomae in Argentina), is located in the city of Santo Tomé, in the province of Santa Fe, Argentina.

== History ==
On 3 July 1979, Blessed John Paul II established the Diocese of Santo Tomé from the Archdiocese of Corrientes and the Diocese of Goya.

== Ordinaries ==
- Carlos Esteban Cremata (1979–1985)
- Alfonso Delgado Evers (1986–1994), appointed Bishop of Posadas
- Francisco Polti Santillán (1994–2006), appointed Bishop of Santiago del Estero
- Hugo Norberto Santiago (2006–2016), appointed Bishop of San Nicolás de los Arroyos)
- Gustavo Alejandro Montini (2016- )
