= Carmelo Giaquinta =

Argentine bishop

Carmelo Juan Giaquinta
- Archbishop of Resistencia
- Church: Catholic Church
- Archdiocese: Archdiocese of Resistencia
- In office: 22 March 1993 – 1 April 2005
- Predecessor: Juan José Iriarte
- Successor: Fabriciano Sigampa
- Previous posts: Bishop of Posadas (1986-1993); Titular Bishop of Zama Minor (1980-1986); Auxiliary Bishop of Viedma (1980-1986)

Orders
- Ordination: 4 April 1953
- Consecration: 30 May 1980 by Juan Carlos Aramburu

Personal details
- Born: 22 June 1930 Buenos Aires, Argentina
- Died: 22 June 2011 (aged 81)

Carmelo Juan Giaquinta (born in Buenos Aires, 22 June 1930 – 22 June 2011) was an Argentine bishop, formerly the Archbishop Emeritus of the Diocese of Resistencia (province of Chaco).

Giaquinta was born in Buenos Aires on 22 June 1930. He was ordained priest in Buenos Aires on 4 April 1953, at the age of 22, and was appointed auxiliary bishop of Viedma (province of Río Negro) on 11 March 1980. Six years later Giaquinta was transferred to the diocese of Posadas, Misiones, and on 22 March 1993 again to Resistencia, where he exercised his ministry as archbishop until his resignation, on 1 April 2005, as customary due to his age. He died on 22 June 2011.

== Views ==
=== Sex education ===
On 6 November 2005, in line with the Catholic Church teachings, Giaquinta criticized the project of a law of compulsory sex education which was under study in Congress, stating that, in the case of its approval, he would "call Christians to civil disobedience". This statement was a follow-up to similarly harsh criticism by Archbishop of La Plata, Héctor Aguer.
