= Diocese of Puerto Iguazú =

Catholic ecclesiastical territory

Diocese of Puerto Iguazú Dioecesis Portus Iguassuensis Diócesis de Posadas

Catholic

Location
- Country: Argentina
- Ecclesiastical province: Corrientes
- Metropolitan: Corrientes

Statistics
- Area: 17,000 km^{2} (6,600 sq mi)
- Population: Total; Catholics: (as of 2004); 300,000; 210,000 (70%)
- Parishes: 25

Information
- Denomination: Roman Catholic
- Rite: Roman Rite
- Established: 16 June 1986 (40 years ago)
- Cathedral: Cathedral of Our Lady of Mount Carmel in Puerto Iguazú
- Patron saint: St Roque González de Santa Cruz

Current leadership
- Pope: Leo XIV
- Bishop: Nicolás Baisi
- Metropolitan Archbishop: Andrés Stanovnik, OFM Cap
- Bishops emeritus: Marcelo Raúl Martorell

The Roman Catholic Diocese of Puerto Iguazú (Latin: Dioecesis Portus Iguassuensis) is in the frontier city of Puerto Iguazú, in the province of Misiones in Argentina.

== History ==
On 16 June 1986, Blessed John Paul II established the Diocese of Puerto Iguazú from the Diocese of Posadas. It lost territory in 2009 when the Diocese of Oberá was established.

== Ordinaries ==
- Joaquín Piña Batllevell S.J. (1986–2006)
- Marcelo Raúl Martorell (2006–2020)
- Nicolás Baisi (2020- )
