= Domingo Salvador Castagna =

Argentine Roman Catholic archbishop (born 1931)

His Excellency, The Most Reverend Domingo Salvador Castagna
- Archbishop Emeritus of Corrientes
- Church: Catholic Church
- Archdiocese: Corrientes
- Appointed: 22 June 1994
- Installed: 27 August 1994
- Term ended: 27 September 2007
- Predecessor: Fortunato Antonio Rossi
- Successor: Andrés Stanovnik
- Other posts: Auxiliary bishop of Buenos Aires (1978–1984); Titular bishop of Germania in Numidia (1978–1984)

Orders
- Ordination: 4 December 1955
- Consecration: 29 December 1978 by Juan Carlos Aramburu

Personal details
- Born: 12 January 1931 (age 95) General La Madrid, Buenos Aires Province, Argentina
- Denomination: Roman Catholic
- Motto: Reconciliatio et Pax

Domingo Salvador Castagna (born 12 January 1931) is an Argentine Roman Catholic prelate, who served as archbishop of Corrientes from 1994 to 2007. He previously served as bishop of San Nicolás de los Arroyos from 1984 to 1994 and as an auxiliary bishop of the Archdiocese of Buenos Aires from 1978 to 1984.

== Early life and priesthood ==
Castagna was born on 12 January 1931 in General La Madrid, in Buenos Aires Province, Argentina. He studied philosophy and theology at the Buenos Aires Metropolitan Seminary and was ordained a priest on 4 December 1955 for the Archdiocese of Buenos Aires.

During his early ministry he served in several pastoral roles in Buenos Aires, including as vicar at the Basilica of Our Lady of Luján and in parishes such as Nuestra Señora del Pilar and Sagrada Eucaristía. He also served as secretary to Bishop Vicente Faustino Zazpe of the Diocese of Rafaela.

Castagna later pursued further studies in theology at the Pontifical Lateran University in Rome and at the Lumen Vitae Institute in Brussels. After returning to Argentina he taught theology at the Universidad del Salvador and the Pontifical Catholic University of Argentina.

== Episcopal ministry ==
On 24 November 1978, Pope John Paul II appointed Castagna auxiliary bishop of Buenos Aires and titular bishop of Germania in Numidia. He received episcopal consecration on 29 December 1978 from Cardinal Juan Carlos Aramburu, archbishop of Buenos Aires, with Archbishop Vicente Faustino Zazpe and Bishop Manuel Marengo as co-consecrators.

On 28 August 1984 he was appointed bishop of the Diocese of San Nicolás de los Arroyos, taking canonical possession of the diocese on 20 October 1984.

During his episcopate in San Nicolás, the devotion to the Virgin of the Rosary of San Nicolás developed following reported Marian apparitions in the city. Castagna established a commission to study the events and organized pastoral attention for the growing number of pilgrims visiting the shrine.

On 22 June 1994 he was appointed archbishop of the Archdiocese of Corrientes. He took canonical possession of the archdiocese on 27 August 1994.

On 27 September 2007, Pope Benedict XVI accepted his resignation upon reaching the canonical retirement age. He was succeeded by Andrés Stanovnik, a member of the Order of Friars Minor Capuchin.

== Works ==
Castagna has authored several works on theology, Christian spirituality, and pastoral life. His publications include books and pastoral reflections intended for clergy and lay faithful in Argentina.

Selected works include:

- La reconciliación y la paz
- Meditaciones para el tiempo litúrgico
- Reflexiones pastorales
- La misión del obispo en la Iglesia
