= Ángel José Macín =

Argentine Roman Catholic bishop (born 1967)

Coat of arms of Ángel José Macín

Ángel José Macín (born 18 March 1967 in Malabrigo) is an Argentine Roman Catholic bishop.

Ordained to the priesthood on 9 July 1992, Macín was named bishop of the Roman Catholic Diocese of Reconquista, Argentina on 12 October 2013.
