= Oberá Cathedral =

Coordinates: 27.4850°S 55.1194°W

St. Anthony of Padua Cathedral
- Catedral de San Antonio de Padua de Oberá
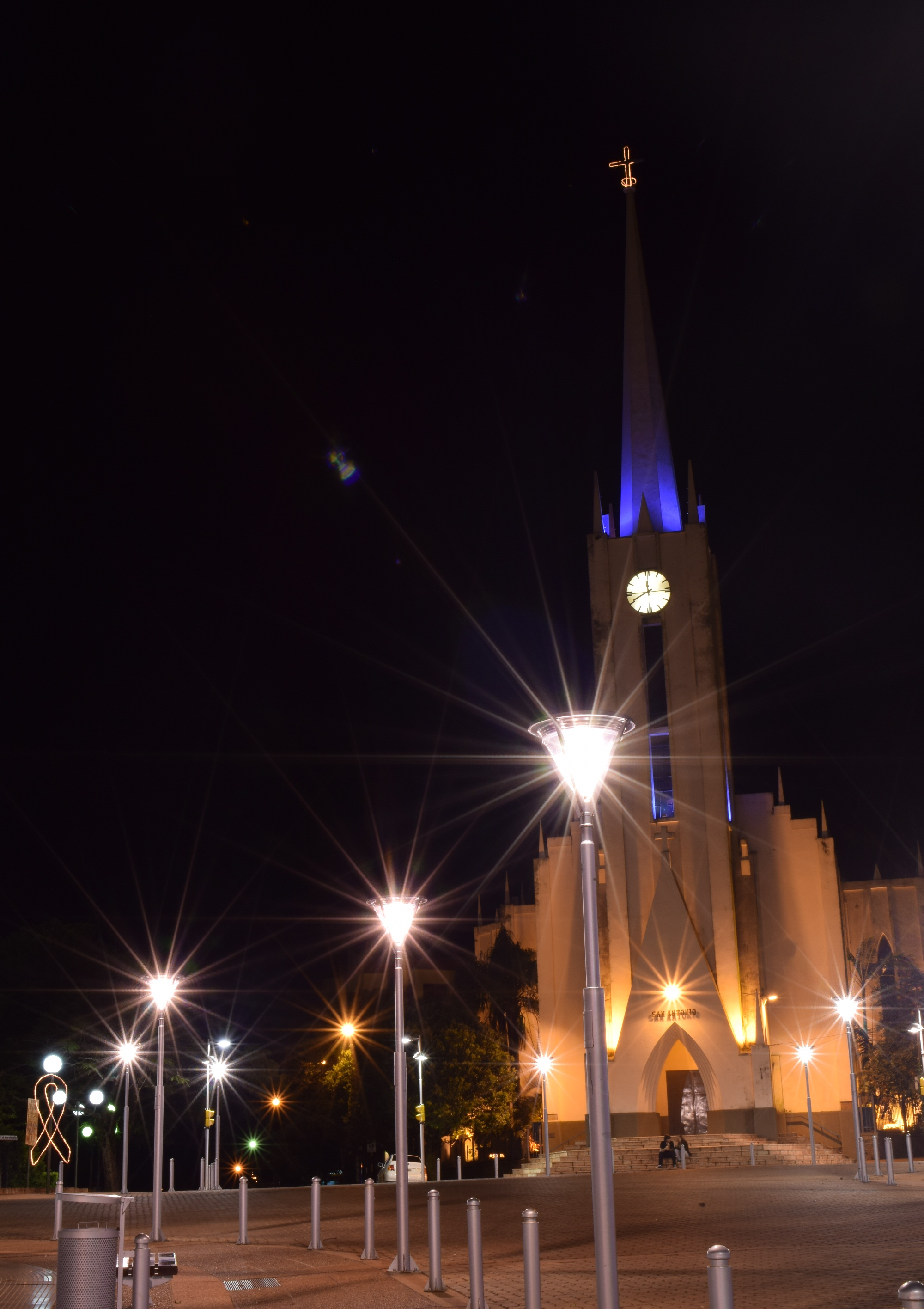
- St. Anthony of Padua Cathedral
- Location: Oberá
- Country: Argentina
- Denomination: Roman Catholic Church

Administration
- Diocese: Roman Catholic Diocese of Oberá

The St. Anthony of Padua Cathedral (Spanish: Catedral de San Antonio de Padua de Oberá), also called Oberá Cathedral, is a Catholic cathedral under the advocacy of St. Anthony of Padua, located in the central area of the city of Oberá, in the province of Misiones, in the South American country of Argentina. Built in neo-Gothic style, it was designed by Austrian architect Anton Von Liebe and started to build in 1943.

In 2009, acquires the status of cathedral when the Diocese of Oberá was created by Pope Benedict XVI. From 1960 he was completing the work, endowing the current fine and modern features. In 1982, he was placed a huge clock tower brought from Switzerland, which was donated by community members.

== See also ==
- List of cathedrals in Argentina
- Roman Catholicism in Argentina
- St. Anthony of Padua Cathedral
