= Fabriciano Sigampa =

Argentine archbishop (1936–2021)

- Archbishop of Resistencia
- Church: Catholic Church
- Archdiocese: Archdiocese of Resistencia
- In office: 17 November 2005 – 21 February 2013
- Predecessor: Carmelo Giaquinta
- Successor: Ramón Alfredo Dus
- Previous posts: Bishop of La Rioja (1992-2005); Bishop of Reconquista (1985-1992)

Orders
- Ordination: 12 December 1970
- Consecration: 3 May 1985 by Bernardo Enrique Witte

Personal details
- Born: 15 September 1936 Vichigasta, La Rioja Province, Argentina
- Died: 31 March 2021 (aged 84) La Rioja, La Rioja Province, Argentina

Fabriciano Sigampa (15 September 1936 – 31 March 2021) was an Argentine Roman Catholic archbishop.

Sigampa was born in Argentina and was ordained to the priesthood in 1970. He served as bishop of the Roman Catholic Diocese of Reconquista, Argentina from 1985 to 1993 and as bishop of the Roman Catholic Diocese of La Rioja, Argentina from 1993 to 2006. He served as archbishop of the Roman Catholic Archdiocese of Resistencia, Argentina, from 2006 to 2013.
