= Diocese of Oberá =

Catholic ecclesiastical territory

Diocese of Oberá Dioecesis Oberensis Diócesis de Oberá
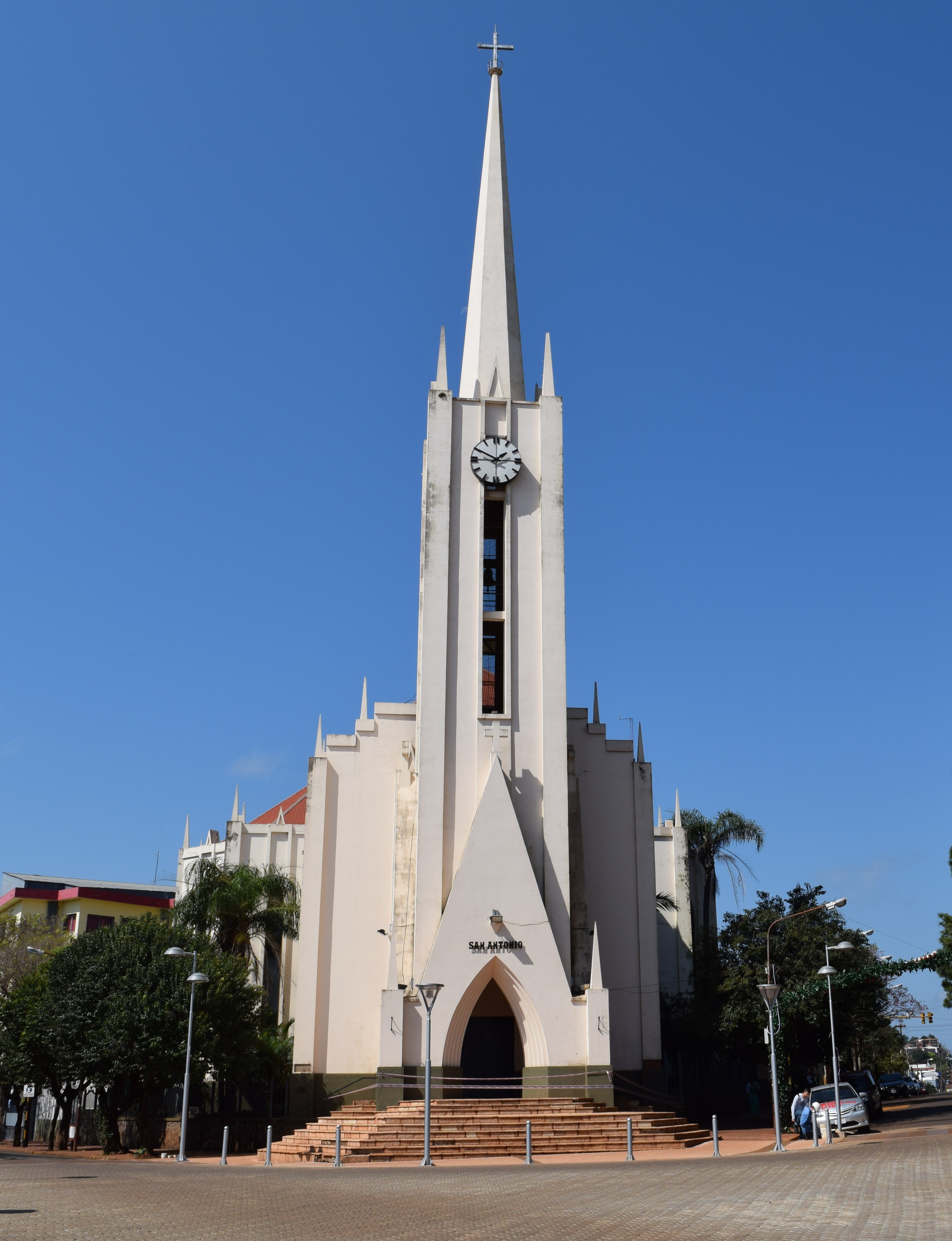
- Cathedral of St. Anthony of Padua

Location
- Country: Argentina
- Ecclesiastical province: Corrientes
- Metropolitan: Corrientes

Statistics
- Area: 78,074 km^{2} (30,145 sq mi)
- Population: Total; Catholics: (as of 2012); 275,100; 203,800 (74.1%)
- Parishes: 17

Information
- Denomination: Roman Catholic
- Rite: Roman Rite
- Established: 13 June 2009 (16 years ago)
- Cathedral: St. Anthony of Padua Cathedral in Oberá

Current leadership
- Pope: Leo XIV
- Bishop: Damián Santiago Bitar
- Metropolitan Archbishop: Andrés Stanovnik

The Roman Catholic Diocese of Oberá (Latin: Dioecesis Oberensis) is a Catholic diocese located in the city of Oberá in the ecclesiastical province of Corrientes in Argentina.

== History ==
On 13 June 2009, Pope Benedict XVI established the Diocese of Oberá from the Diocese of Posadas and the Diocese of Puerto Iguazú.

== Ordinaries ==
- Victor Selvino Arenhart † (13 June 2009 – 17 May 2010) Died
- Damián Santiago Bitar (26 October 2010 – Present)
