= Joaquín Piña Batllevell =

Joaquín Piña Batllevell SJ
- Bishop of Puerto Iguazú
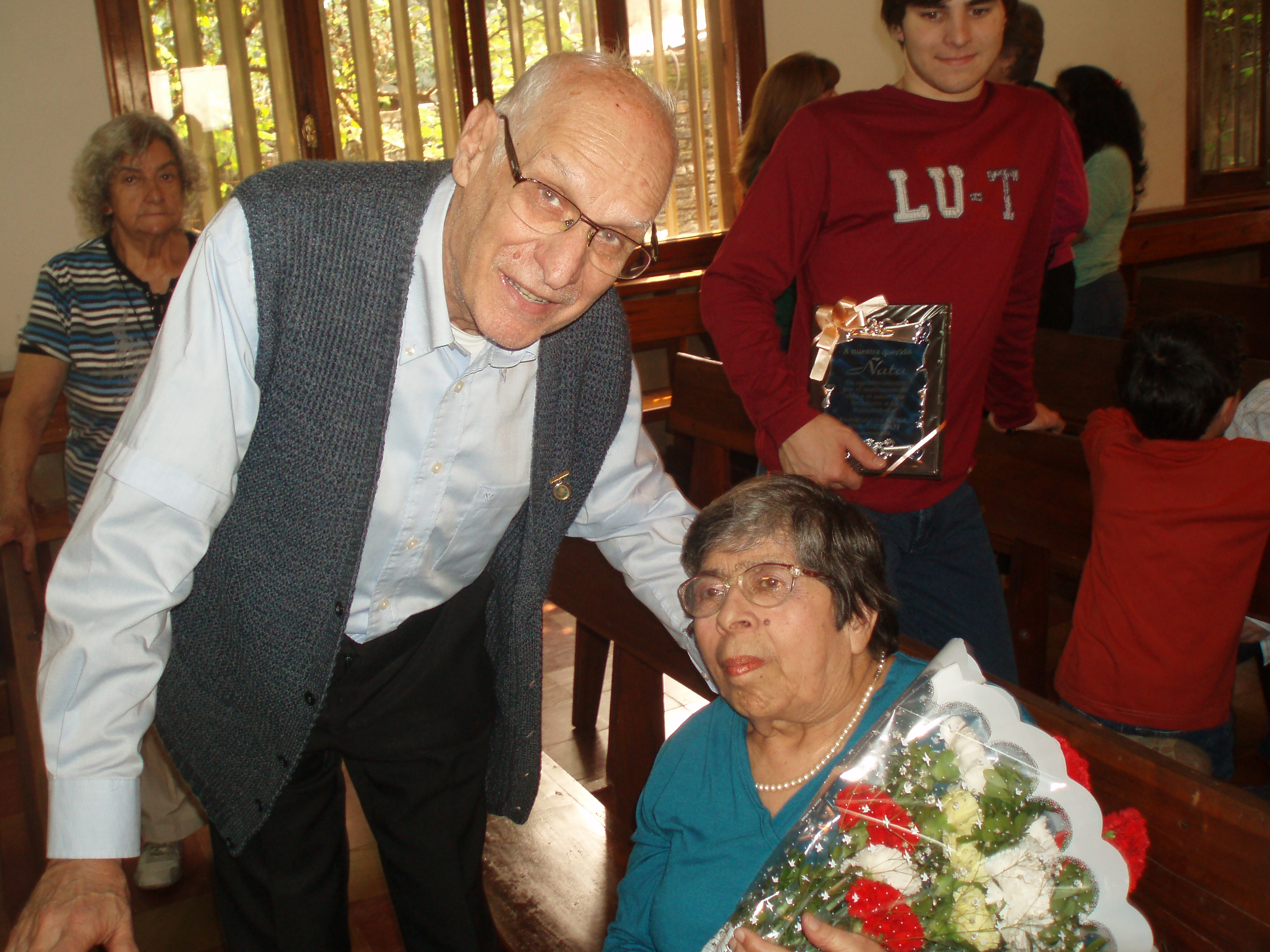
- Joaquín Piña Batllevell in September 2010
- Native name: Joaquim Piña i Batllevell
- Church: Catholic Church
- Diocese: Diocese of Puerto Iguazú
- In office: 16 June 1986 – 3 October 2006
- Predecessor: Diocese erected
- Successor: Marcelo Martorell

Orders
- Ordination: 10 December 1961
- Consecration: 16 August 1986 by Jorge Kemerer

Personal details
- Born: 25 May 1930 Sabadell, Province of Barcelona, Kingdom of Spain
- Died: 8 July 2013 (aged 83)

Joaquin Piña Batllevell SJ (25 May 1930 − 8 July 2013) was a Spanish Argentine Roman Catholic bishop.

Ordained to the priesthood for the Society of Jesus on 10 December 1961, Piña Batllevell was named bishop of the Roman Catholic Diocese of Puerto Iguazú, Argentina on 16 June 1986 and retired on 3 October 2006.
