= Our Lady of the Rosary of San Nicolás =

Apparitions of the Blessed Virgin in Argentina (1983)

Our Lady of the Rosary of San Nicolás Nuestra Señora del Rosario de San Nicolás
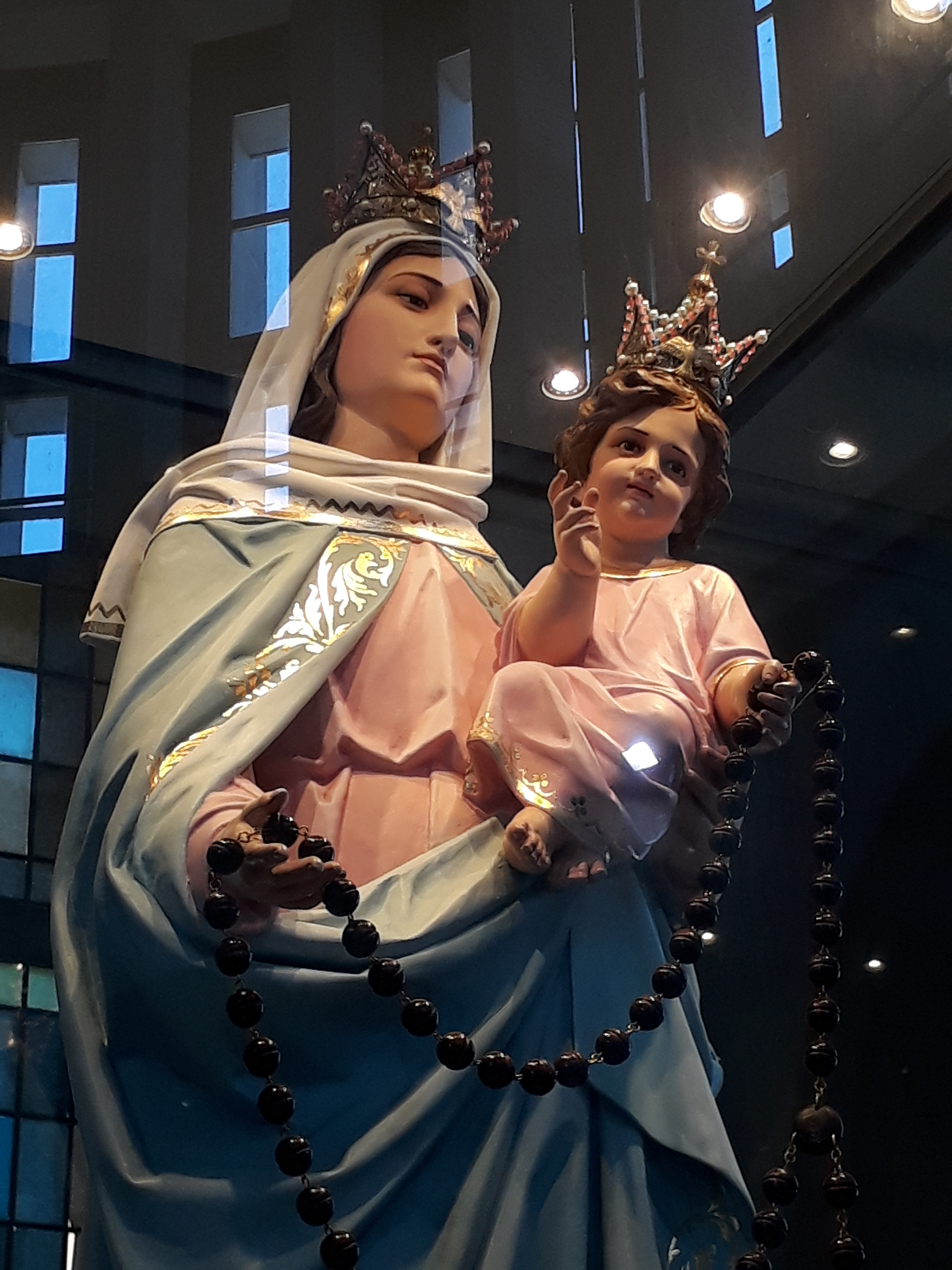
- Date: 1884, rediscovered 1983
- Type: Plaster statue, crowned
- Approval: May 22 2016,Bishop Héctor Cardelli, Diocese of San Nicolás de los Arroyos
- Shrine: Sanctuary of Our Lady of Rosary of San Nicolás, Buenos Aires province, Argentina

Our Lady of the Rosary of San Nicolás is, in Catholicism, a title of veneration of the Virgin Mary associated with reported private revelations to Gladys Quiroga de Motta, a middle-aged housewife, beginning in 1983, in the city of San Nicolás de los Arroyos, Argentina. Gladys said that she was tasked with promoting this devotion to the Mother of God under this title, with an emphasis on key passages in the Bible and a particular mystical stellar symbolism.

The apparitions have continued almost every day since 1983 and have been approved by the Catholic Church. Messages from 1983 to 1990 have been officially approved and published, and miracles, conversions and healings are said to occur in the Sanctuary of Our Lady of the Rosary of San Nicolás in Buenos Aires, Argentina. Under the title María Del Rosario de San Nicolas, de Motta stated that the Virgin Mary called Catholics to pray one hour per day, to receive the Eucharist daily, to repentance and conversion.

The pilgrimage site, named in honor of Our Lady of the Rosary of San Nicolás erected in San Nicolás de los Arroyos, is one of the most important in Argentina.

== History ==
The parish church of San Nicolás de los Arroyos was dedicated to Our Lady of the Rosary. In 1884, a statue of Our Lady of the Rosary was donated by a member of the parish who brought it from Rome and had it blessed by Pope Leo XIII.

A century later, in 1983, Gladys Quiroga de Motta, an Argentine laywoman, married and mother of two daughters, reportedly received a series of private revelations from the Virgin Mary, as well as Jesus Christ. At the time, Motta had only a fourth-grade education and no formal biblical or theological training. The events began after several Rosaries in multiple homes of the town of San Nicolás de los Arroyos began to glow and display unusual radiance, which led her to pray the Rosary.

The first reported apparition of the Virgin Mary to Motta occurred on 25 September 1983, while she was praying the Rosary in her room. This date is now commemorated as the feast of Our Lady of the Rosary of San Nicolás. According to Gladys, Mary appeared dressed in blue, holding the baby Jesus and a rosary in her hand, but quickly disappeared without speaking. Other families in the city later reported similar visitations.

Later, the Virgin Mary allegedly spoke to Gladys for the first time on 13 October 1983, the anniversary of the last apparition at Fátima. That day, Mary said to come to her and to not be afraid, that she did well. She also gave Gladys a Bible reference. During following apparitions and visions, Mary regularly referred Gladys to particular Scriptures.

On October 25, a month after the first apparition, as Gladys was praying in the cathedral in the town of Rosario, the Virgin Mary appeared, gave her a white rosary, and said “Receive this Rosary from my hands and keep it forever and ever. You are obedient; I am happy because of it. Rejoice, for God is with you”.

On 27 November 1983, the Virgin Mary allegedly asked de Motta to look for a statue that was forgotten away in a church. As the priest and Motta were looking for the statue in the belfry of the diocesan church, the priest found it and showed it to Motta. Gladys recognized that the statue represented Mary as she had seen her from the beginning. According to Motta, Mary then appeared to her and requested that the statue be placed back in the cathedral, despite it being missing a hand and lacking a rosary in her hands. Over the course of a century, the church, as well as the statue, had suffered significant damage.

In December 1984, the Virgin reportedly asked for a medal to be cast, with her image on the front side and the title Our Lady of the Rosary of San Nicolás, and on the reverse side, the Holy Trinity with seven stars. Later, in September 1985, Mary explained to Gladys: “My daughter, I will tell you the meaning of the seven stars. They are seven graces that my Son Jesus will grant to those who wear it on their breast. Praise be to the Lord.”

The first unexplained cure linked to the apparitions occurred in 1984, when a seven-year-old boy named Gonzalo Miguel, who was terminally ill with a brain tumor, was reportedly healed.

From the beginning of the apparitions, Motta shared the messages she received with the church authorities and the local bishops and remained fully cooperative. Later, her spiritual guide, Father Carlos Pérez, expressed his conviction that the apparitions were genuine. After local religious authorities approved the spiritual merits, the bishop granted the construction of a sanctuary dedicated to Lady of the Rosary of San Nicolás, as requested by Mary during the apparitions.

Gladys has reportedly received the stigmatas on her wrists, feet, side, and shoulder.

=== Messages ===
The messages of Our Lady of the Rosary of San Nicolás bear similarities to those of other Marian apparitions, such as at Fátima, Portugal, where the Virgin Mary also identified herself as Our Lady of the Rosary. According to Gladys, Mary stated: “Today, like then in Fatima, are my visits to Earth, although these are more frequent and prolonged since mankind lives moments of great drama”.

The messages given to Gladys over time cover a wide range of topics, with a primary focus on themes such as repentance and conversion, emphasizing the necessity of these for the salvation of souls. Key topics include the importance of prayer, particularly the Rosary, the consecration to the Immaculate Heart of Mary, and the frequent reception of the Sacraments. Additionally, the messages highlight the significance of the Eucharist and the real presence of Christ, as well as the role of Mary as the Ark of the New Covenant.

=== Chronology ===
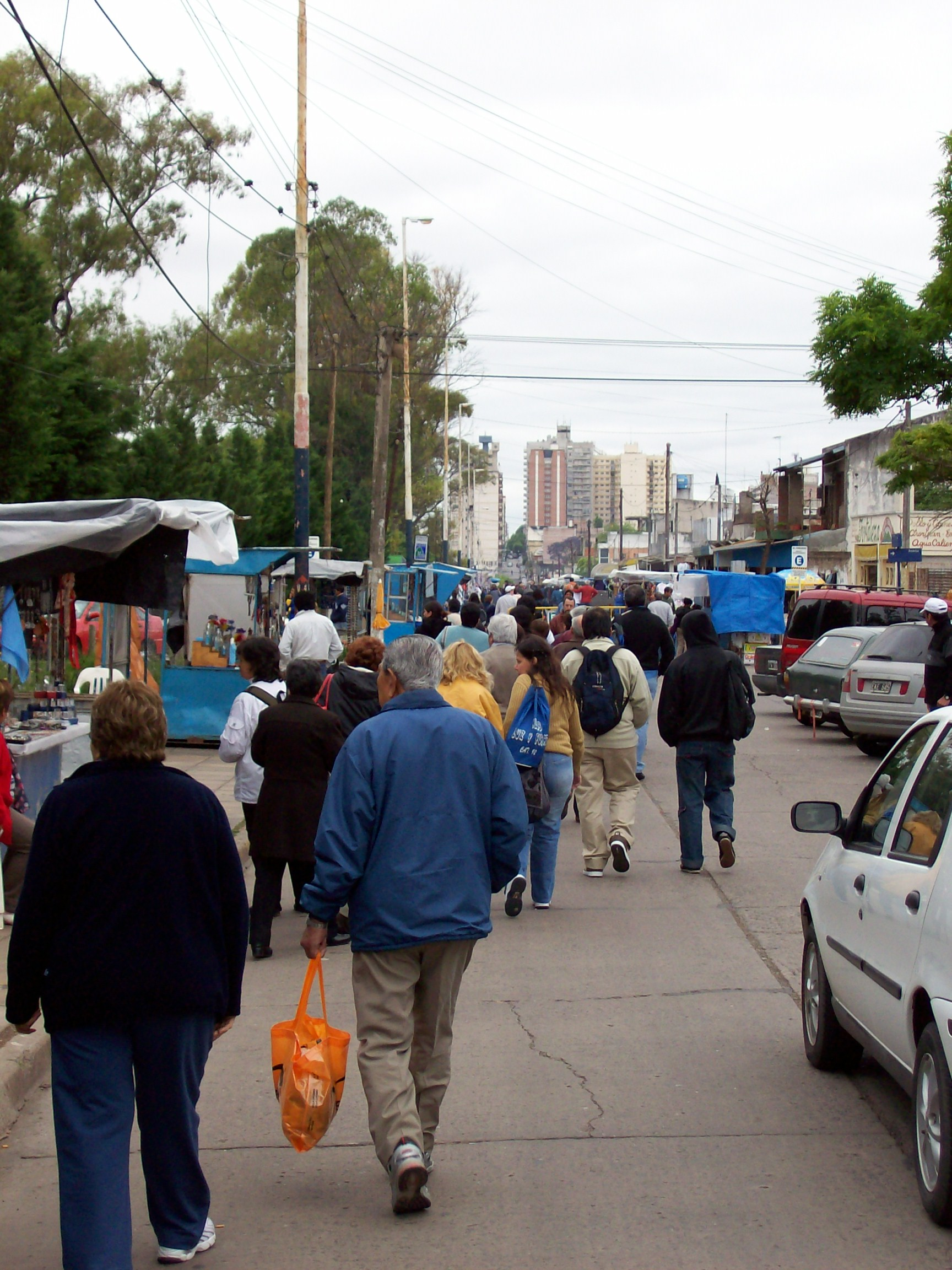
Catholic pilgrims walking along Sarmiento Avenue, lined with religious merchandise booths, leading to the Sanctuary of Our Lady of the Rosary of San Nicolás of the Arroyos, in Argentina

- 1884: Donation of a statue of Our Lady of the Rosary to the parish church of San Nicolás.
- 25 September 1983: The Virgin Mary reportedly appears to Gladys Quiroga de Motta.
- 28 September 1983: A second reported apparition.
- 7 October 1983: Gladys asks the Virgin what she wants, and receives a vision of a chapel.
- 12 October 1983: Gladys entrusts herself to a priest, Carlos Pérez.
- 13 October 1983: The Virgin speaks to her for the first time.
- 15 November 1983: Gladys receives the message: "I am Patroness of this region". "Assert My rights".
- The first message from Jesus is given; in the future Jesus will appear once a month with a message, which prologues the Virgin's message.
- 19 November 1983: The Virgin makes Gladys know her mission: "You are a bridge of union", "Preach My Word".
- 24 November 1983: A ray of light indicates to Gladys the location of the future sanctuary. She recognizes the apparition when she sees the statue of Our Lady of the Rosary, relegated in the bell tower due to its deterioration. The Virgin appears and tells her: "I want to be on the banks of the Paraná".
- 19 July 1984: Founding of the Marian Movement of San Nicolás
- 2 December 1984: Mary asks for a medal to be struck in her image with the title of Our Lady of the Rosary of San Nicolás, and on the reverse side the Holy Trinity with seven stars.
- 25 May 1985: A multitude of pilgrims arrive in San Nicolás.
- 13 June 1985: 10,000 booklets are printed with the messages of Our Lady of the Rosary of San Nicolás in Rosario, Santa Fe, the neighboring province and seat of the Archbishop of the Archdiocese of Rosario.
- 25 August 1985: The municipal authorities of San Nicolás deed the land known as el campito (in English 'little meadow', meaning a small raised patch of dry land amongst the wetland creeks known in Spanish as arroyas) to the Catholic Church for the building of the sanctuary.
- 25 September 1985: The Virgin Mary explains to Gladys the symbolism of the medal and the seven stars, which are the seven graces that her son Jesus Christ grants to whomever carries the medal on their chest.
- 25 October 1985: Inauguration of a hostel for pilgrims and a center for the promotion of Marian devotion under the title Virgen de Rosario de San Nicolas de los Arroyos
- June 1987: 2.3 million copies of images of the statue of Our Lady of the Rosary of San Nicolás had been disseminated.
- 5 April 1987: Local Bishop Castagna greets Pope John Paul II during a papal visit to Argentina.
- 8 October 1987: A contract was signed with a construction company for the building of a new sanctuary.
- 2 April 1990: Worldwide pilgrimage of 60,000 priests from all parts of the globe.

== Veneration and pilgrimages ==
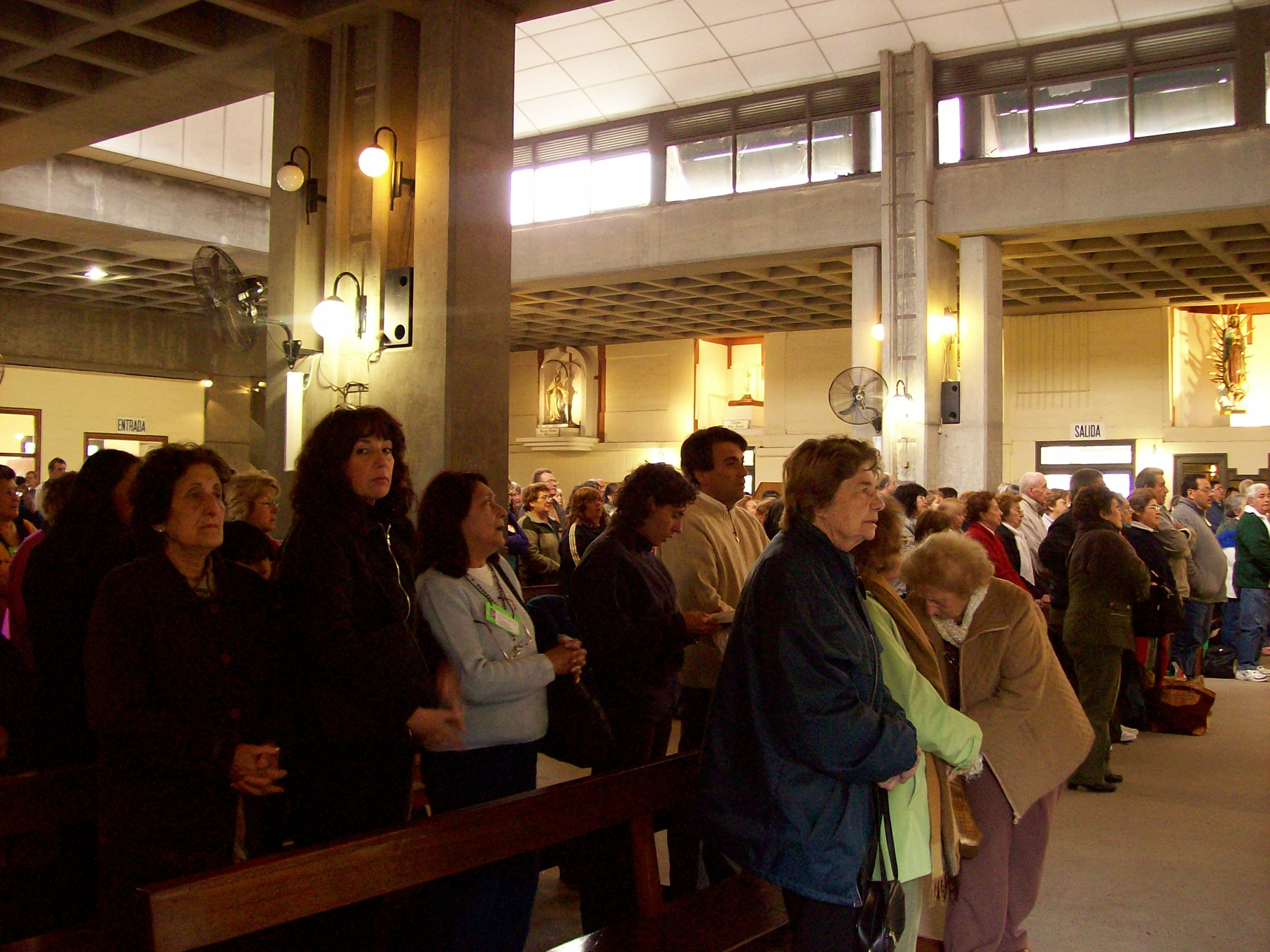
Partial view of pilgrims within the Sanctuary of Our Lady of the Rosary of San Nicolás

At the time of the reported apparitions of Our Lady of San Nicolás, the Bishop Domingo Castagna, as well as his successor, the Bishop Héctor Cardelli, frequently celebrated Mass and led processions at the site of the apparitions, situated on the banks of the Paraná River. A large sanctuary was built at the location. Since then, every September 25, the city of San Nicolás hosts hundreds of thousands of pilgrims and faithful who gather to commemorate the apparitions and to venerate and honor the statue of Our Lady of the Rosary of San Nicolás.

In 2003, on the twentieth anniversary of the first alleged Marian apparition, the second largest group ever congregated: 400,000 faithful. Pilgrims came from all the provinces of Argentina, with a group of more than 1,000 people from Buenos Aires who traveled 240 km (150 mi) on foot.

On 25 September 2008, a Eucharistic celebration was held near the Sanctuary of San Nicolás to mark the 25th anniversary of the apparitions of Our Lady of San Nicolás. The event attracted approximately 200,000 participants and was presided over by Héctor Cardelli, the Bishop of San Nicolás de los Arroyos.

On 25 September 2013, thirty years after the first apparition of the Virgin Mary, 500,000 people gathered, surpassing the record of 2003.

== The Sanctuary ==
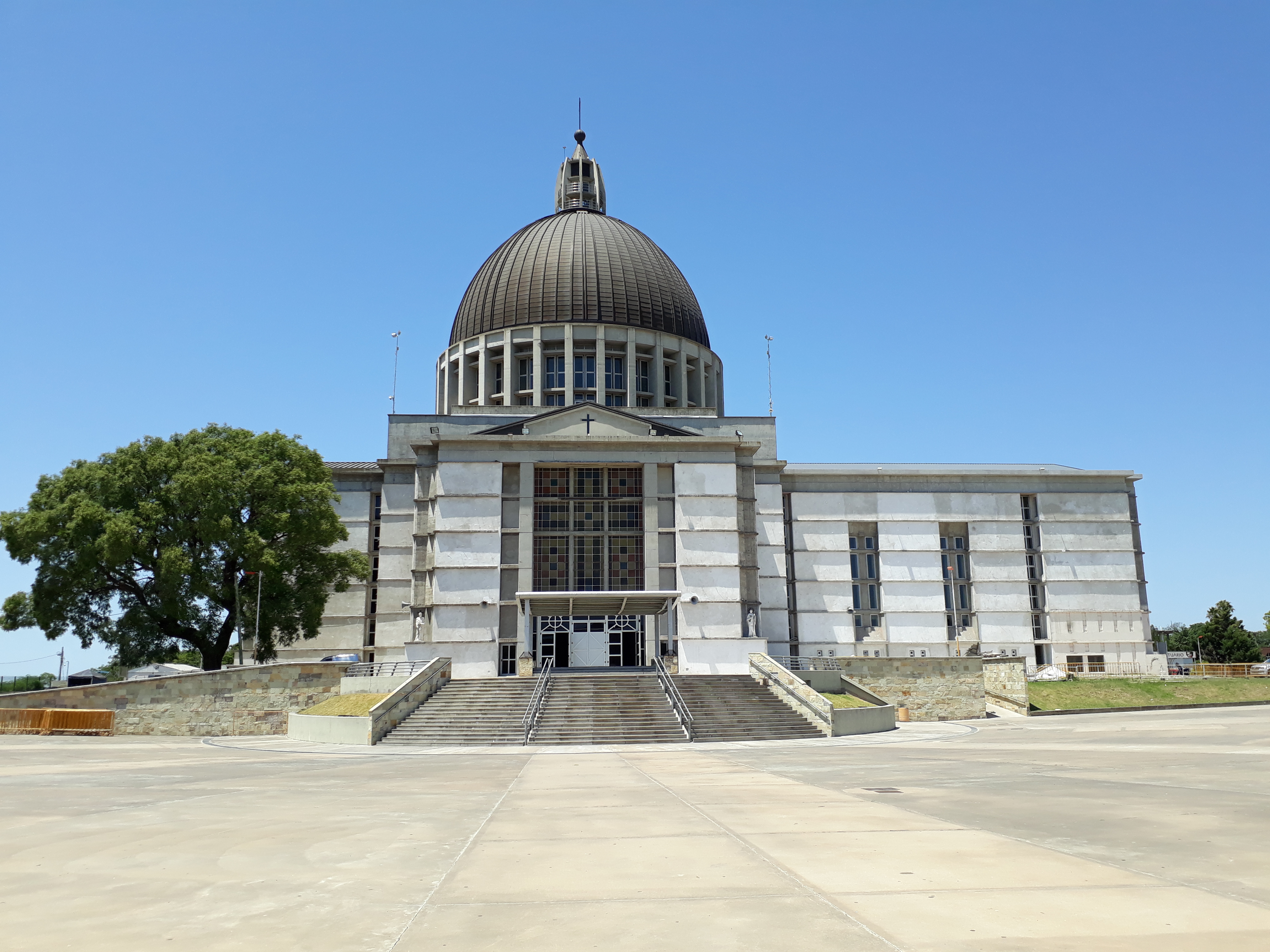
The Sanctuary of Our Lady of the Rosary of San Nicolás in Buenos Aires, Argentina

After a thorough discernment and study of the events, Bishop Domingo Castagna authorized the construction of a Marian shrine capable of welcoming close to 10,000 people, located at a site that was specifically indicated by the Virgin to Gladys de Motta. The shrine was built according to plans to accommodate 8,000 to 9,000 people standing on the ground floor and special mezzanines. Additionally, terraces and esplanades were constructed to accommodate larger numbers during outdoor events.

The 24-metre (79 ft) diameter dome, comprising a vertical arrangement of 64 sections of reinforced concrete faced on the exterior with copper plating, is visible from many locations in the city.

On 25 May 2014, the interior of the Sanctuary was inaugurated in its entirety.

== Publications ==
In August 1990, the French theologian René Laurentin, an expert in Marian devotions, published the results of his study of the apparitions in over 163 pages produced during his visit to the city. He acknowledged a collaboration with local Bishop Domingo Salvador Castagna, Marie Helene Sutter de Gall, and the priest Carlos Pérez, the priest in whom Gladys Motta confided her spiritual experiences.

In 1994, the historian Cayetano Bruno from the nearby city of Rosario, seat of the Archdiocese, published his "History of the Manifestations of Our Lady of the Rosary of San Nicolás" compiled from testimonies and official records kept in the archives of the Sanctuary.

A 1990 book titled "Messages" records a compendium of the messages in the words of the visionary Gladys Motta as received during apparitions since 1987. In 1991 Victor Martinez published his book titled "Who is this woman?"

== Approval by the Roman Catholic Church ==
In a decree made public during a Mass on 22 May 2016, Holy Trinity Sunday, Héctor Cardelli, Bishop of the Diocese of San Nicolás, officially declared that the apparitions that took place in San Nicolás have a "supernatural character" and are "worthy of belief". This recognition also officially makes the first 1800 messages of Our Lady of the Rosary of San Nicolas to Gladys, between 1983 and 1990, of supernatural origin and worthy of belief. The bishop also granted official license, an imprimatur, for these revelations to be published. This official recognition was declared after twelve years of study by Bishop Cardelli according to Vatican guidelines and in consultation with experts and witnesses.

Since then, the two following bishops of San Nicolás allowed the publication of the new messages through 2015 and the Marian phenomenon has been approved by the last four local bishops.

== See also ==
- Marian devotions
- Veneration of Mary in the Catholic Church
- Other Titles of Mary in Latin America
- Other Shrines to the Virgin Mary in Argentina
- Marian art in the Catholic Church
- Roman Catholic Mariology
