= Diocese of Posadas =

Catholic ecclesiastical territory

Coordinates: 27°21′57″S 55°53′38″W

Diocese of Posadas Dioecesis Posadensis Diócesis de Posadas

Catholic
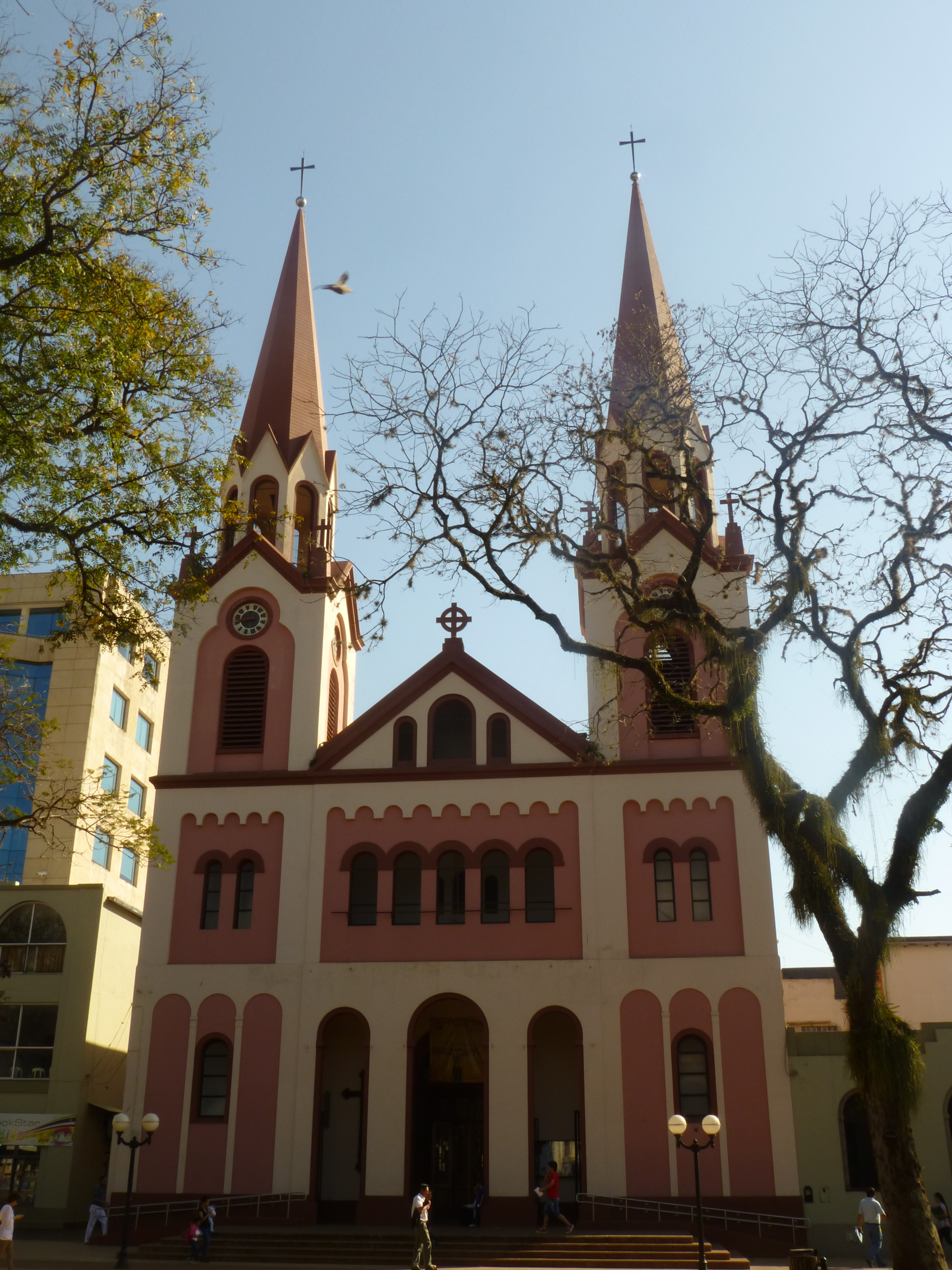
- Cathedral of St Joseph

Location
- Country: Argentina
- Ecclesiastical province: Corrientes
- Metropolitan: Corrientes

Statistics
- Area: 13,206 km^{2} (5,099 sq mi)
- Population: Total; Catholics: (as of 2004); 769,000; 552,890 (71.9%)
- Parishes: 37

Information
- Denomination: Roman Catholic
- Rite: Roman Rite
- Established: 11 February 1957 (69 years ago)
- Cathedral: St. Joseph's Cathedral in Posadas, Misiones
- Patron saint: St Ignatius of Loyola; St Roque González de Santa Cruz

Current leadership
- Pope: Leo XIV
- Bishop: Juan Rubén Martinez
- Metropolitan Archbishop: Andrés Stanovnik

The Roman Catholic Diocese of Posadas (Latin: Dioecesis Posadensis) is a Catholic diocese located in the city of Posadas, Misiones in the ecclesiastical province of Corrientes in Argentina.

== History ==
On 11 February 1957, Pope Pius XII established the Diocese of Posadas from the Diocese of Corrientes. It lost territory in 1986 when the Diocese of Puerto Iguazú was established and again in 2009 when the Diocese of Puerto Oberá was established.

== Bishops ==
=== Ordinaries ===
- Jorge Kémérer S.V.D. (1957–1986)
- Carmelo Juan Giaquinta (1986–1993), appointed Archbishop of Resistencia
- Alfonso Delgado Evers (1994–2000), appointed Archbishop of San Juan de Cuyo
- Juan Rubén Martinez (2000– )

=== Other priest of this diocese who became bishop ===
- Victor Selvino Arenhart, appointed Bishop of Oberá in 2009
