= Diocese of Goya =

Catholic ecclesiastical territory

Diocese of Goya Dioecesis Goyanensis Diócesis de Goya

Catholic

Location
- Country: Argentina
- Ecclesiastical province: Corrientes
- Metropolitan: Corrientes

Statistics
- Area: 33,603 km^{2} (12,974 sq mi)
- Population: Total; Catholics: (as of 2006); 270,000; 244,000 (90.4%)
- Parishes: 15

Information
- Denomination: Catholic Church
- Rite: Roman Rite
- Established: 10 April 1961 (65 years ago)
- Cathedral: Cathedral of Our Lady of the Rosary in Goya, Corrientes

Current leadership
- Pope: Leo XIV
- Bishop: Adolfo Ramón Canecín
- Metropolitan Archbishop: Andrés Stanovnik

The Roman Catholic Diocese of Goya (Latin: Dioecesis Goyanensis) is in Argentina and is a suffragan of the Archdiocese of Corrientes. It was established by Blessed John XXIII on 10 April 1961.

== Bishops ==
=== Ordinaries ===
- Alberto Devoto (1961–1984)
- Luis Teodorico Stöckler (1985–2002)
- Ricardo Oscar Faifer (2002–2015)
- Adolfo Ramón Canecín (2015- )

=== Coadjutor bishop ===
- Adolfo Ramón Canecín (2014-2015)

=== Other priest of this diocese who became bishop ===
- Ricardo Rösch, appointed Bishop of Concordia in 1961

== Territorial losses ==
Year	Along with	To form
1979	Archdiocese of Corrientes	Diocese of Santo Tomé

== External links and references ==
- "Diocese of Goya". Catholic-Hierarchy. ^{[self-published]}
