= Diocese of Reconquista =

Catholic ecclesiastical territory

Diocese of Reconquista Dioecesis Reconquistensis Diócesis de Reconquista

Catholic
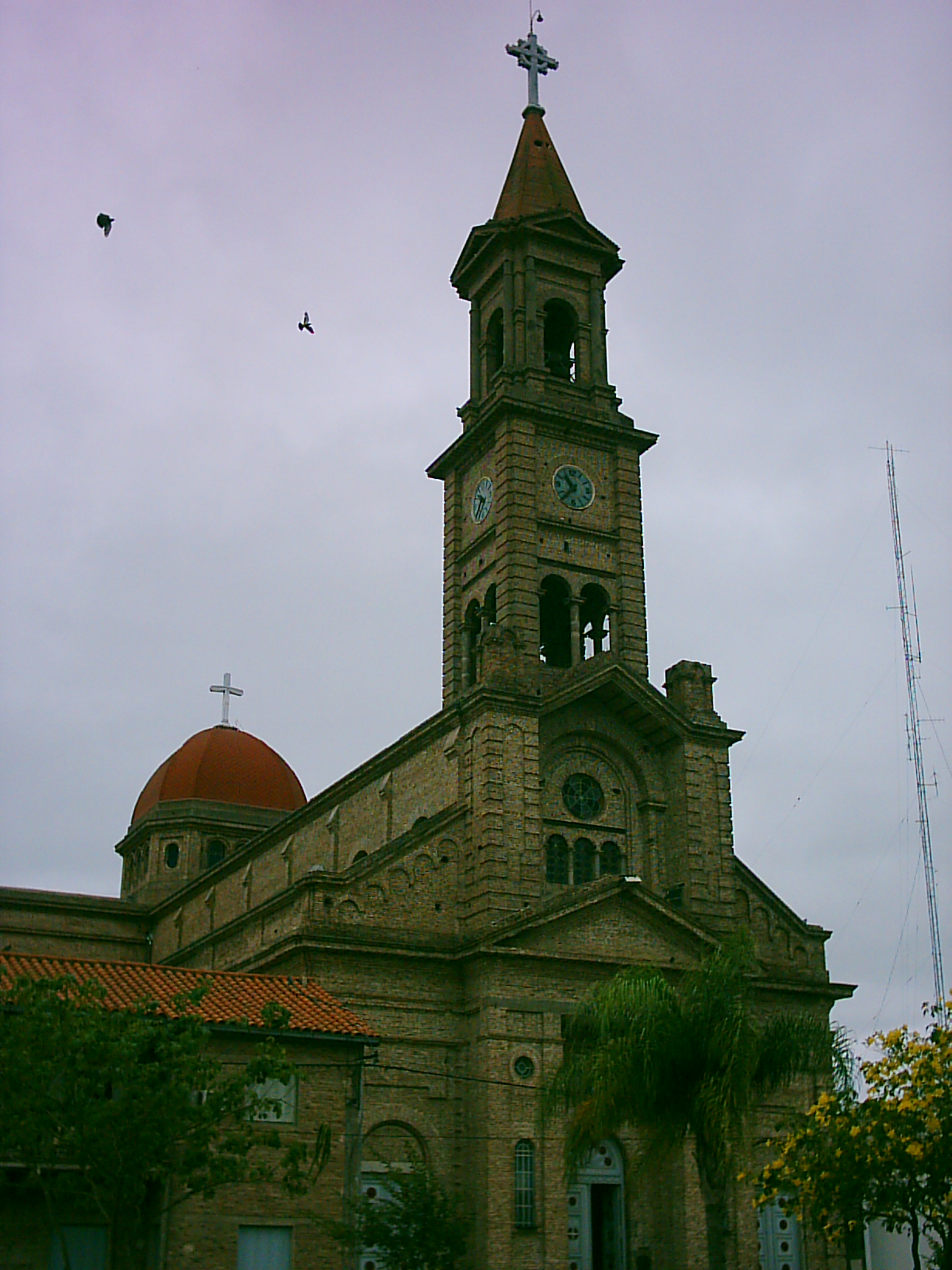
- Cathedral of the Immaculate Conception

Location
- Country: Argentina
- Ecclesiastical province: Santa Fe de la Vera Cruz

Statistics
- Area: 35,000 km^{2} (14,000 sq mi)
- Population: Total; Catholics: (as of 2010); 273,000; 240,000 (87.9%)
- Parishes: 20

Information
- Denomination: Roman Catholic
- Rite: Roman Rite
- Established: 11 February 1957 (69 years ago)
- Cathedral: Cathedral of the Immaculate Conception in Reconquista, Santa Fe
- Patron saint: Saint Joseph; St John the Apostle

Current leadership
- Pope: Leo XIV
- Bishop: Ángel José Macín
- Metropolitan Archbishop: José María Arancedo

Website
- www.obispadorqta.org.ar

The Roman Catholic Diocese of Reconquista (Latin: Dioecesis Reconquistensis) is located in the city of Reconquista, in the north of the province of Santa Fe, in Argentina.

== History ==
On 11 February 1957 Pope Pius XII founded the Diocese of Reconquista from territory taken from the Archdiocese of Santa Fe. It lost territory to the Diocese of Rafaela in 1961.

== Bishops ==
=== Ordinaries ===
- Juan José Iriarte (1957–1984) appointed, Archbishop of Resistencia
- Fabriciano Sigampa (1985–1992) appointed, Bishop of La Rioja
- Juan Rubén Martinez (1994–2000) appointed, Bishop of Posadas
- Andrés Stanovnik, O.F.M. Cap. (2001–2007) appointed, Archbishop of Corrientes
- Ramón Alfredo Dus (2008–2013) appointed, Archbishop of Resistencia
- Ángel José Macín (2013–present)

=== Other priest of this diocese who became bishop ===
- Dante Gustavo Braida Lorenzón, appointed Auxiliary Bishop of Mendoza in 2015
