= Archdiocese of Resistencia =

Catholic ecclesiastical territory

Coordinates: 27.4507°S 58.9883°W

Archdiocese of Resistencia Archidioecesis Resistenciae Arquidiócesis de Resistencia

Catholic
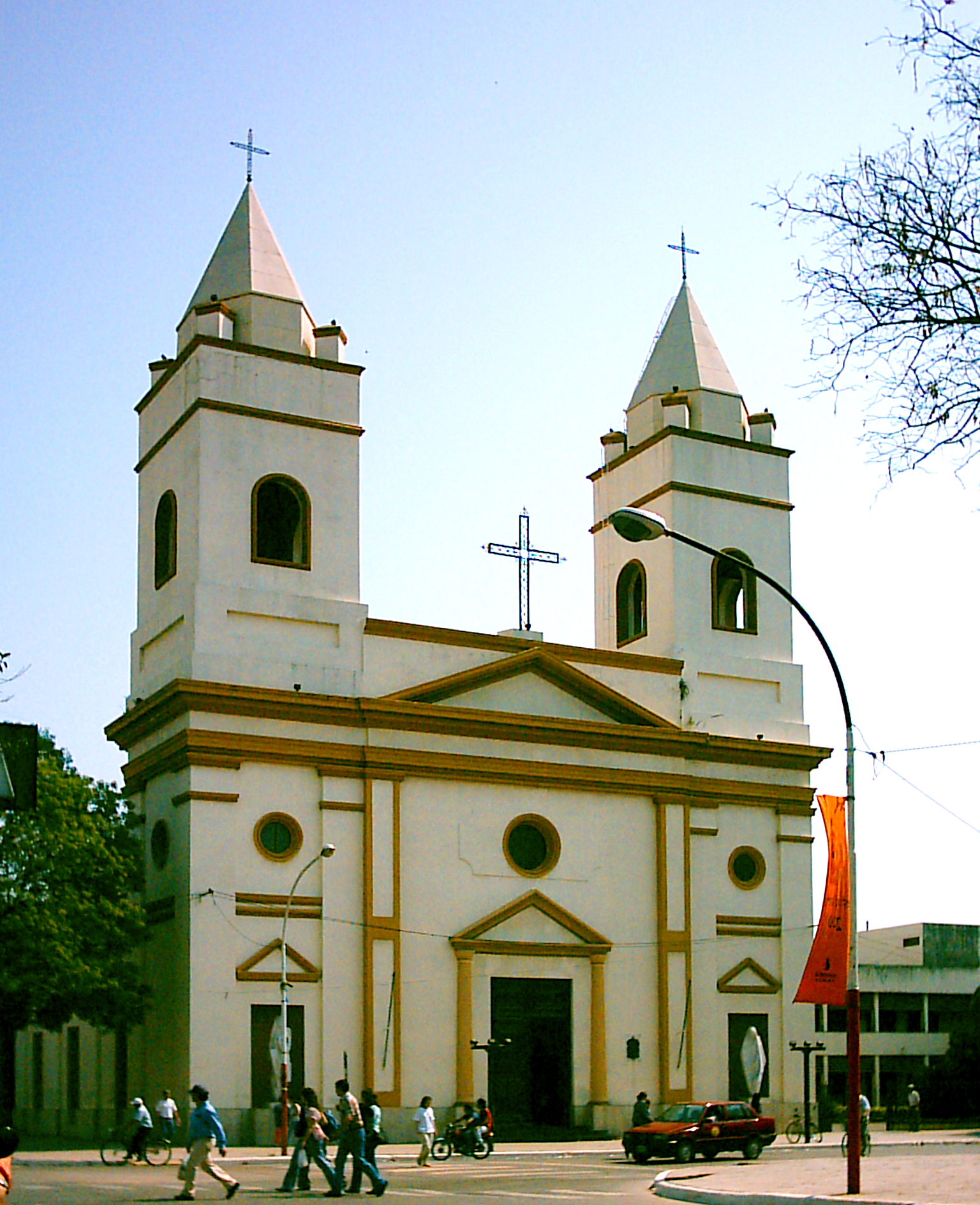
- Cathedral of St. Fernando the King

Location
- Country: Argentina
- Ecclesiastical province: Resistencia

Statistics
- Area: 28,250 km^{2} (10,910 sq mi)
- Population: Total; Catholics: (as of 2010); 595,000; 495,000 (83.2%)
- Parishes: 30

Information
- Denomination: Roman Catholic
- Rite: Roman Rite
- Established: 3 June 1939 (87 years ago)
- Cathedral: Cathedral of St Ferdinand III of Castile in Resistencia, Chaco
- Patron saint: Immaculate Conception; St Joseph the worker

Current leadership
- Pope: Leo XIV
- Metropolitan Archbishop: Ramón Alfredo Dus

The Roman Catholic Archdiocese of Resistencia (Latin: Archidioecesis Resistenciae) is in Argentina and is a metropolitan diocese. Its suffragan sees include Formosa and San Roque de Presidencia Roque Sáenz Peña.

== History ==
On 3 June 1939, Pope Pius XII established the Diocese of Resistencia from the Archdiocese of Santa Fe. It lost territory to the Diocese of Formosa when it was created in 1957 and to the Diocese of Presidencia Roque Sáenz Peña in 1961. The Diocese of Resistencia was elevated to an archdiocese by Pope John Paul II on 28 February 1984.

== Ordinaries ==
Bishops of Resistencia (Roman Rite)

- Nicolás de Carlo (1940–1951)
- Enrique Rau (1954–1957), appointed Bishop of Mar del Plata
- José Agustín Marozzi (1957–1984), retired

Archbishops of Resistencia (Roman Rite)

- Juan José Iriarte (1984–1991), retired
- Carmelo Juan Giaquinta (1993–2005), resigned
- Fabriciano Sigampa (2005–2013), retired
- Ramón Alfredo Dus (2013–Present)

== Territorial losses ==
Year	Along with	To form
1957		Diocese of Formosa
1963		Diocese of Presidencia Roque Sáenz Peña
