= Víctor Selvino Arenhart =

- Bishop of Oberá
- Church: Catholic Church
- Diocese: Diocese of Oberá
- In office: 13 June 2009 – 17 May 2010
- Predecessor: Diocese erected
- Successor: Damián Santiago Bitar

Orders
- Ordination: 5 March 1977
- Consecration: 15 August 2009 by Adriano Bernardini

Personal details
- Born: 23 December 1948 Campo Grande, National Territory of Misiones, Argentina
- Died: 17 May 2010 (aged 61)

Víctor Selvino Arenhart (23 December 1948 – 17 May 2010) was the first Roman Catholic bishop of the Roman Catholic Diocese of Oberá, Argentina.

Ordained on 5 March 1977, Selvino Arenhart was appointed the first bishop of the newly created Oberá Diocese by Pope Benedict XVI on 13 June 2009 and was ordained bishop on 15 August 2009. The bishop died while still in office.
