= Diocese of San Nicolás de los Arroyos =

Catholic ecclesiastical territory

Diocese of San Nicolás de los Arroyos Dioecesis Sancti Nicolai de los Arroyos Diócesis de San Nicolás de los Arroyos

Catholic
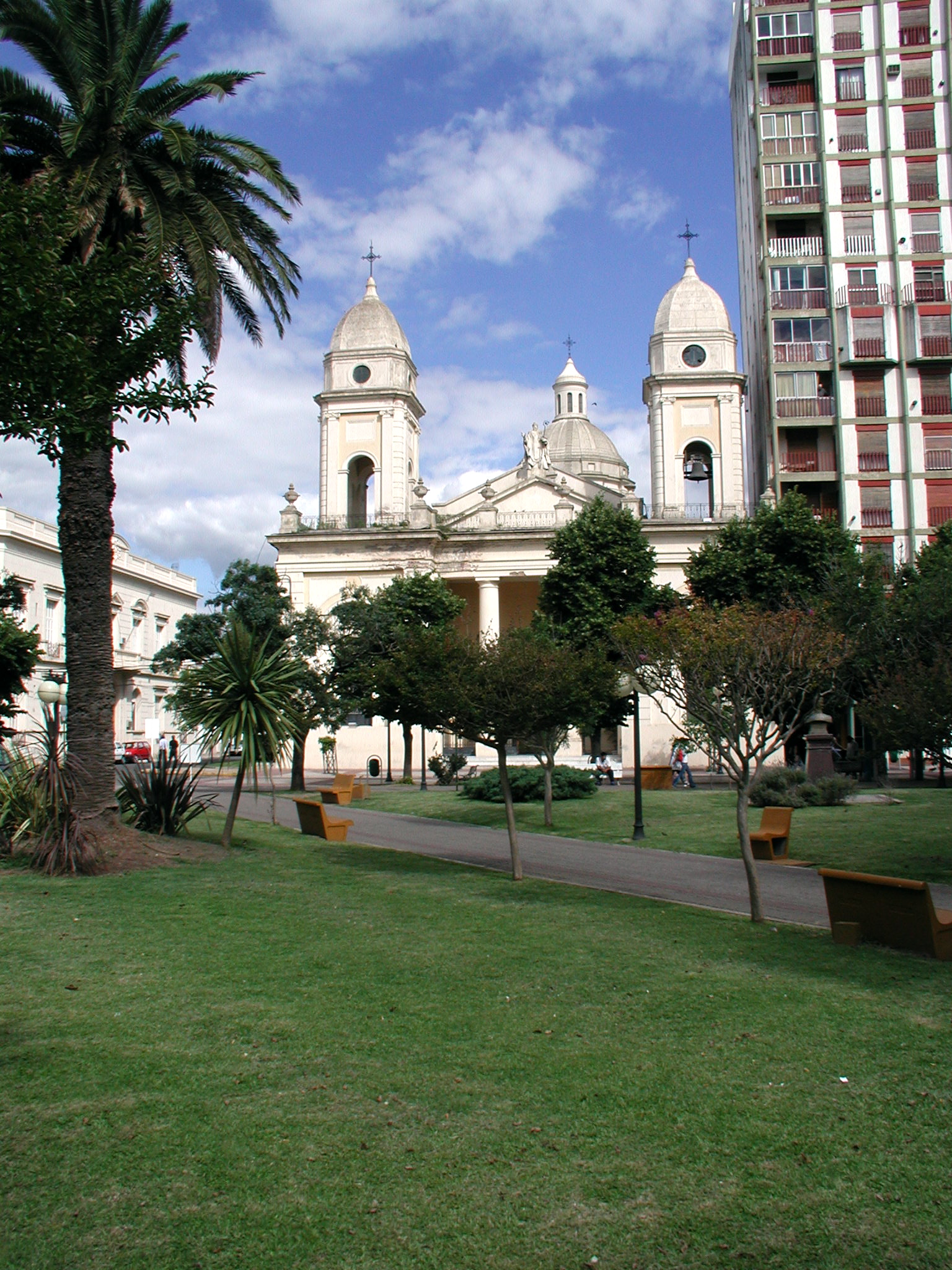
- Cathedral of St. Nicholas of Bari

Location
- Country: Argentina
- Ecclesiastical province: Rosario
- Metropolitan: Rosario

Statistics
- Area: 14,500 km^{2} (5,600 sq mi)
- Population: Total; Catholics: (as of 2004); 427,000; 390,000 (91.3%)
- Parishes: 51

Information
- Denomination: Catholic
- Rite: Roman Rite
- Established: 3 March 1947 (79 years ago)
- Cathedral: Cathedral of St Nicholas of Myra in San Nicolás de los Arroyos
- Patron saint: Saint Nicholas

Current leadership
- Pope: Leo XIV
- Bishop: Hugo Norberto Santiago
- Metropolitan Archbishop: Eduardo Eliseo Martín

Website
- Website of the Diocese

The Diocese of San Nicolás de los Arroyos is based in the city of San Nicolás de los Arroyos, which is usually shortened to San Nicolás, and is a suffragan of the archdiocese of Rosario, Argentina.

== History ==
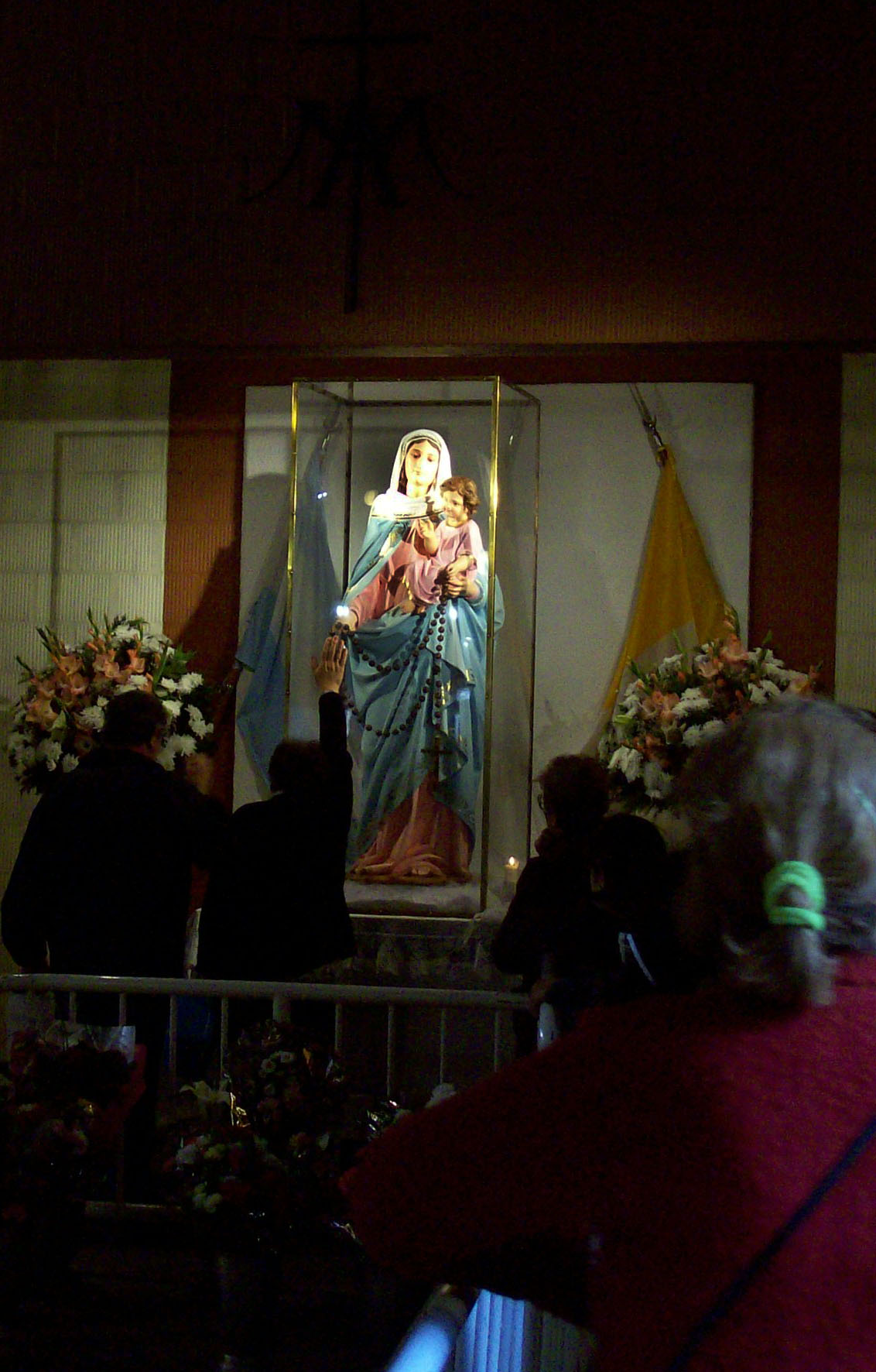
Statue of Our Lady of the Rosary of San Nicolás original furnishings of St. Nicholas of Bari Cathedral, now enshrined in a newly-erected Sanctuary of the same name in San Nicolás de los Arroyos

On 3 March 1947, Pope Pius XII established the Diocese of San Nicolás de los Arroyos from territory taken from the Diocese of La Plata and the Diocese of Mercedes. It lost territory to the Diocese of San Isidro when it was created in 1957 and the Diocese of Zárate-Campana in 1976.

=== Apparations approved ===
The diocesan seat, the Cathedral of St Nicholas of Myra, was home to a neglected statue of Our Lady of the Rosary that had been blessed by Pope Leo XIII. The statue was rediscovered after an image of Our Lady appeared in a vision to a local lay woman mother-of-two Gladys Motta, leading to a renewed devotion under the title Our Lady of the Rosary of San Nicolás and the erection of a new Sanctuary with hostel for pilgrims and a center for promoting popular piety. In a decree signed on May 22, 2016 and made public a few days later, Héctor Cardelli, Bishop of the Diocese of San Nicolás, declared that the apparitions that occurred over a number of years beginning in the 1980s were supernatural in origin. The devotion is thus approved "worthy of belief" at the Diocesan level within the Catholic Church.

== Ordinaries ==
- Silvino Martínez (1954–1959), appointed Bishop of Rosario
- Francisco Juan Vénnera (1959–1966)
- Carlos Horacio Ponce de Léon (1966–1977)
- Fortunato Antonio Rossi (1977–1983), appointed Archbishop of Corrientes
- Domingo Salvador Castagna (1984–1994), appointed Archbishop of Corrientes
- Mario Luis Bautista Maulión (1995–2003), appointed Archbishop of Paraná
- Héctor Sabatino Cardelli (2004–2016)
- Hugo Norberto Santiago (2016–
