= Archdiocese of Corrientes =

Catholic ecclesiastical territory

Archdiocese of Corrientes Archdioecesis Corrientensis Arquidiócesis de Corrientes

Catholic
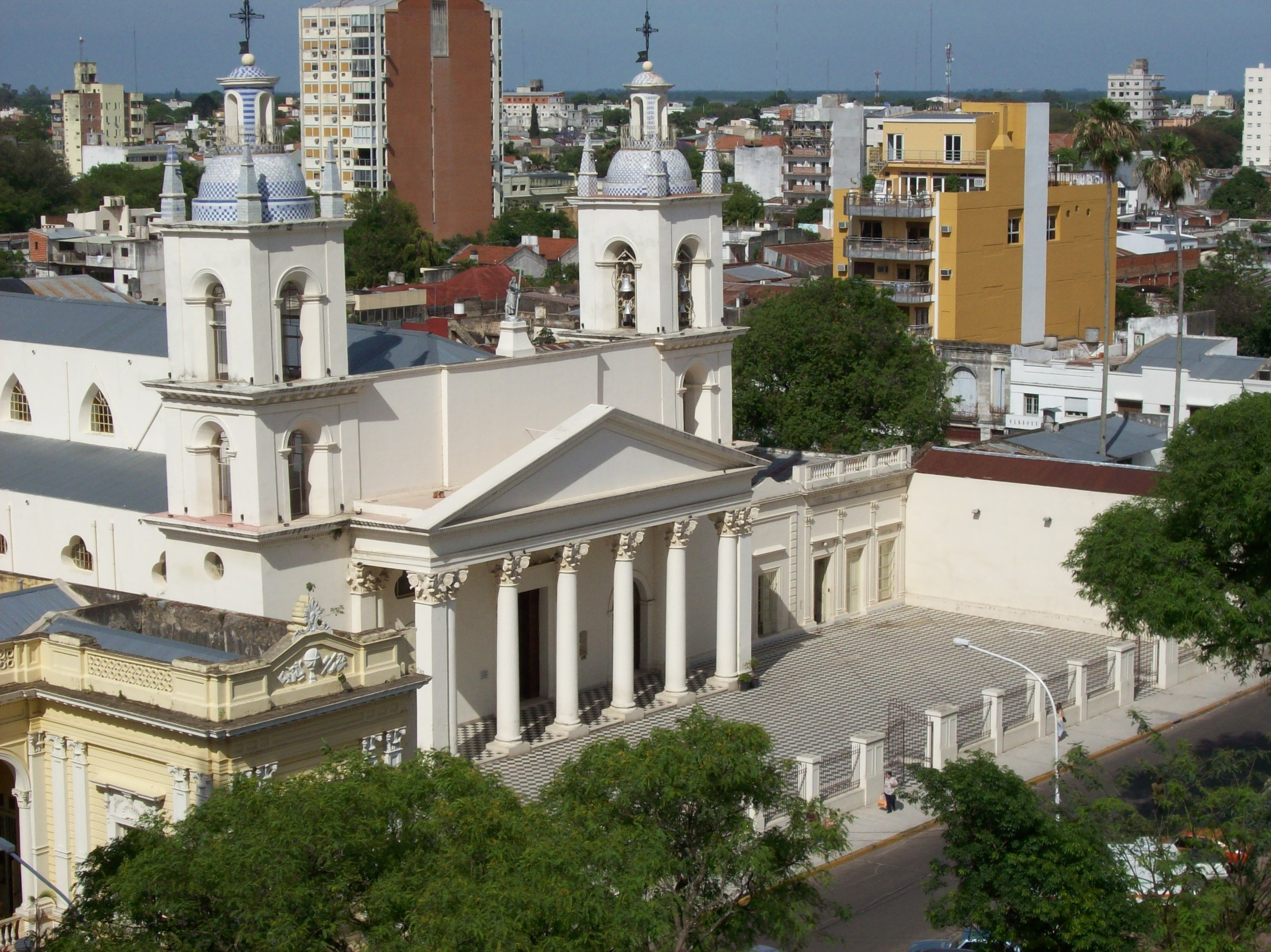
- Cathedral of Our Lady of the Rosary

Location
- Country: Argentina
- Ecclesiastical province: Corrientes

Statistics
- Area: 26,218 km^{2} (10,123 sq mi)
- Population: Total; Catholics: (as of 2006); 880,649; 946,936 (93%)
- Parishes: 49

Information
- Denomination: Roman Catholic
- Rite: Roman Rite
- Established: 21 January 1910 (116 years ago)
- Cathedral: Cathedral of Our Lady of the Rosary in Corrientes
- Patron saint: Our Lady of Itatí

Current leadership
- Pope: Leo XIV
- Metropolitan Archbishop: José Adolfo Larregain
- Bishops emeritus: Domingo Salvador Castagna

The Roman Catholic Archdiocese of Corrientes (erected 21 January 1910, as the Diocese of Corrientes) is in Argentina and is a metropolitan diocese and its suffragan sees include Goya, Oberá, Posadas, Puerto Iguazú and Santo Tomé. It was elevated on 10 April 1961.

== History ==
The Diocese of Corrientes was established on 21 January 1910. (Note: However, a footnote in the Second Vatican Council's Decree on the Apostolate of the Laity (1965) refers to a Sacred Congregation of the Council document from 1920 relating to its dissolution.) It became an Archdiocese on 10 April 1961.

== Bishops ==
=== Ordinaries ===
- Luis María Niella (1911–1933)
- Francisco Vicentín (1934–1972)
- Jorge Manuel López (1972–1983), appointed Archbishop of Rosario
- Fortunato Antonio Rossi (1983–1994)
- Domingo Salvador Castagna (1994–2007)
- Andres Stanovnick, O.F.M. Cap. (2007–present)

=== Auxiliary bishops ===
- Pedro Dionisio Tibiletti (1929–1934), appointed Bishop of San Luis
- José Adolfo Larregain, O.F.M. (2020– ), elect

=== Other priest of this diocese who became bishop ===
- Jorge Ramón Chalup, appointed Bishop of Gualeguaychú in 1957

== Territorial losses ==
Year	Along with	To form
1957		Diocese of Posadas
1961		Diocese of Goya
1979		Diocese of Santo Tomé
