= Andrés Stanovnik =

The Most Reverend Andrés Stanovnik OFMCap
- Archbishop of Corrientes
- Church: Roman Catholic Church
- Archdiocese: Corrientes
- See: Corrientes
- Appointed: 27 September 2007
- Installed: 15 December 2007
- Predecessor: Domingo Salvador Castagna
- Previous posts: Bishop of Reconquista (2001-07); Secretary General of the Latin American Episcopal Council (2004-07); Second Vice-President of the Latin American Episcopal Council (2007-11); Apostolic Administrator of Orán (2017-18)

Orders
- Ordination: 2 September 1978
- Consecration: 16 December 2001 by Jorge Mario Bergoglio

Personal details
- Born: Andrés Stanovnik; 15 December 1949 (age 76) Buenos Aires, Argentina
- Education: Universidad del Salvador
- Motto: Hagan lo que él les diga
- Coat of arms

Andrés Stanovnik OFMCap (December 15, 1949) is a prelate of the Roman Catholic Church. He served as bishop of Reconquista from 2001 until 2007, when he became archbishop of Corrientes.

== Life ==
Born in Buenos Aires, Stanovnik became a member of the Order of Friars Minor Capuchin on July 16, 1978. He was ordained to the priesthood on September 2, 1978.

On October 30, 2001, he was appointed bishop of Reconquista. Stanovnik received his episcopal consecration on the following December 16 from Jorge Mario Bergoglio, archbishop of Buenos Aires, the future Pope Francis, with bishop of Posadas, Juan Rubén Martinez, bishop emeritus of San Luis, Juan Rodolfo Laise, nuncio for Argentina, archbishop Santos Abril y Castelló, and bishop of Venado Tuerto, Gustavo Arturo Help, serving as co-consecrators.

On September 27, 2007, he was appointed archbishop of Corrientes.
