= Eduardo Maria Taussig =

Catholic bishop

The Most Reverend Eduardo Maria Taussig
- Bishop of San Rafael
- Church: Roman Catholic Church
- Diocese: San Rafael
- See: San Rafael
- Appointed: 21 July 2004
- Installed: 11 October 2004
- Term ended: 5 February 2022
- Predecessor: Guillermo José Garlatti
- Successor: Carlos María Domínguez

Orders
- Ordination: 3 December 1982 by Juan Carlos Aramburu
- Consecration: 25 September 2004 by Jorge Mario Bergoglio

Personal details
- Born: Eduardo Maria Taussig; 4 July 1954 (age 72)
- Education: Pontifical Catholic University of Argentina; Pontifical University of Saint Thomas Aquinas
- Motto: Paterna atque fraterna charitate
- Coat of arms

Eduardo Maria Taussig (born July 4, 1954) is an Argentinian prelate of the Roman Catholic Church. He was the bishop of San Rafael from 2004 to 2022.

== Biography ==
Eduardo Maria Taussig was born in Buenos Aires on 9 July 1954. His family immigrated to Argentina from Bohemia, now the Czech Republic. After attending the Colegio San Pablo in Buenos Aires, he studied philosophy at the Pontifical Catholic University of Argentina (UCA) and theology at the Buenos Aires seminary. He was ordained to the priesthood on 3 December 1982 by Cardenal Juan Carlos Aramburu. He continued his studies, earning a philosophy degree at UCA and then a doctorate in theology at the Pontifical University of Saint Thomas Aquinas in 1990.

Returning to Buenos Aires, he was Parish Vicar in San José del Talar, professor of philosophy and theology at UCA, chaplain of a university residence hall, and advisor of the Fundar Association and of the Consortium of Catholic Odontologists. In 2002 he was appointed parish priest of San Luca and director of the diocesan office of university pastoral service.

On 21 July 2004, Pope John Paul II appointed him bishop of San Rafael. Taussig received his episcopal consecration on 25 September from Jorge Mario Bergoglio, archbishop of Buenos Aires, later Pope Francis. He was installed as bishop on 11 October. He was viewed as a relatively conservative bishop, friendly with Archbishop Hector Aguer, for example, Pope Francis' "nemesis" when he was archbishop of Buenos Aires.

In July 2020, as a safety measure to restrict the spread of the COVID-19 virus, he instituted a rule that Holy Communion be received in the hand rather than on the tongue. When the priests and laity of the diocese protested this, Taussig identified the seminary, the largest in Argentina, as the center of opposition to his authority and closed it. In October he asked people not to join marches protesting the seminary closure. In November, Taussig faced protests during a pastoral visit where he attempted to explain his decision to close the seminary.

Pope Francis accepted his resignation as bishop of San Rafael on 5 February 2022.
