= Rómulo García =

- Archbishop of Bahía Blanca
- Church: Catholic Church
- Archdiocese: Archdiocese of Bahía Blanca
- In office: 31 May 1991 – 15 June 2002
- Predecessor: Jorge Mayer
- Successor: Guillermo José Garlatti
- Previous posts: Bishop of Mar del Plata (1976-1991); Titular Bishop of Uzita (1975-1976); Auxiliary Bishop of Mar del Plata (1975-1976)

Orders
- Ordination: 10 December 1950
- Consecration: 24 September 1975 by Eduardo Francisco Pironio

Personal details
- Born: 24 March 1927 Necochea, Buenos Aires Province, Argentina
- Died: 18 December 2005 (aged 78) Bahía Blanca, Buenos Aires Province, Argentina

Rómulo García (24 March 1927 – 18 December 2005) was Roman Catholic archbishop emeritus of the Archdiocese of Bahía Blanca, Argentina. His title, in Latin, at the moment of his death was Romulus, Archiepiscopus Emeritus Sinus Albinensis. His highest position was archbishop from 1991 to 2002. His style, as the one of any archbishop or bishop in Argentina is "His Very Reverend Excellency". Address style for them is Monsignor.

He was born in Buenos Aires on 24 March 1927. Ordained as priest on 10 December 1950, he was appointed as Bishop of Uzita and auxiliary bishop of the Diocese of Mar del Plata, - suffragan of the Archdiocese of La Plata - on 9 August 1975. He became Bishop of Mar del Plata on 19 January 1976.

Pope John Paul II appointed him Archbishop of Bahía Blanca on 31 May 1991 taking over on a formal Mass on 24 September 1991. The chosen motto for his coat of arms was "Totus tuus" ("completely yours", addressing The Lord). His predecessor was Archbishop Jorge Mayer. He was reputed for his speeches, lectures, serene and reflective character. He was also appointed as a member of the Catholic Commission for homeless and refugees, in the Vatican whom her served until retirement.

As it is of common use in the Catholic Church and ruled by Pope John Paul II, he resigned to his pastoral duty on 15 June 2002 when he turned 80 years of age, becoming then archbishop emeritus, after which he decided to continue living in Bahía Blanca, in a private home of his own. His successor is the present archbishop of Bahía Blanca HVRE Monsignor Guillermo José Garlatti.

García died in Bahía Blanca on 18 December 2005.
