= Óscar Vicente Ojea Quintana =

The Most Reverend Oscar Vicente Ojea Quintana
- Bishop of San Isidro
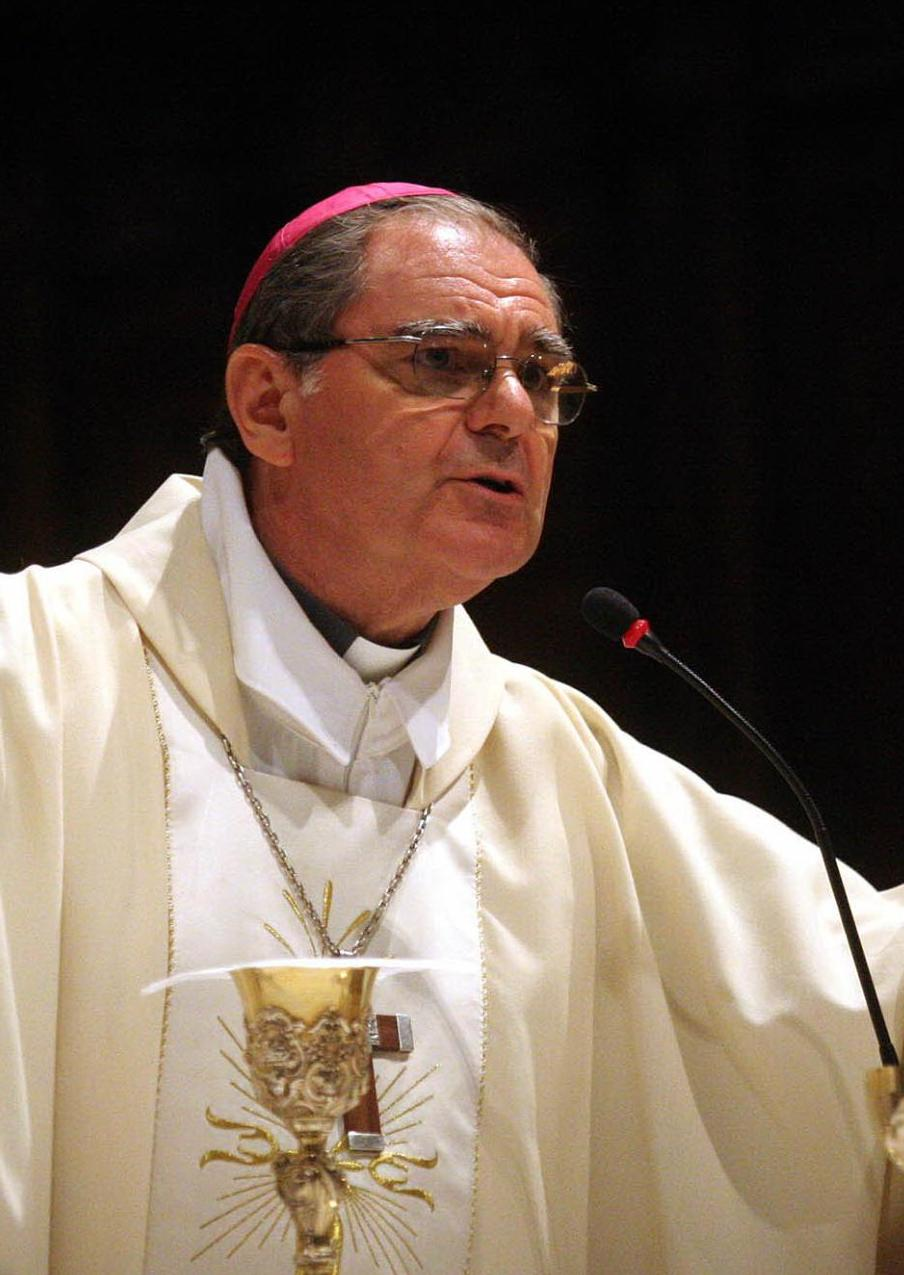
- Church: Roman Catholic Church
- Diocese: San Isidro
- See: San Isidro
- Appointed: 30 December 2011
- Predecessor: Alcides Jorge Pedro Casaretto
- Other post(s): President of the Argentine Episcopal Conference (2017-)
- Previous post(s): Titular Bishop of Suelli (2006-09); Auxiliary Bishop of Buenos Aires (2006-09); Coadjutor Bishop of San Isidro (2009-11)

Orders
- Ordination: 25 November 1972 by Juan Carlos Aramburu
- Consecration: 2 September 2006 by Jorge Mario Bergoglio

Personal details
- Born: 15 October 1946 (age 78); Buenos Aires, Argentina
- Motto: Spe gaudentes
- Coat of arms

Oscar Vicente Ojea Quintana (15 October 1946) is an Argentine prelate of the Catholic Church who has been bishop of San Isidro since 2011 after being named bishop coadjutor there in 2009. He was an auxiliary bishop of Buenos Aires from 2006 until 2009.

== Biography ==
Born in Buenos Aires on 15 October 1946, Ojea Quintana attended the seminary in his native diocese and earned a bachelor's degree in theology at the Catholic University of Argentina. He was ordained a priest of the Diocese of Buenos Aires on 25 November 1972.

He was a parish vicar from 1973 to 1985 and then priest in the parishes of Saint Magdalena and Saint Rose of Lima. Beginning in 1994 he led the parish of Our Lady of Perpetual Help, one of the largest and most important in Buenos Aires. He served several times as deacon of zone 2 of the diocese and assessor of the Christian Family Movement.

On 24 May 2006, he was appointed auxiliary bishop of Buenos Aires and titular bishop of Suelli. Ojea Quintana received his episcopal consecration on the following 2 September from Jorge Mario Bergoglio, archbishop of Buenos Aires, the later Pope Francis, with archbishop emeritus of Rosario, Eduardo Mirás, and archbishop of La Plata, Héctor Rubén Aguer, serving as co-consecrators.

On 7 October 2009, he was appointed bishop co-adjutor of San Isidro, succeeding as bishop on 30 December 2011.

He was elected to a three-year term as president of the Argentine Bishops Conference in the fall of 2017 and has been re-elected.

On 8 March 2018, Pope Francis named him a member of the council of 18 bishops charged with preparing the Synod on the Amazon in 2019.

After revelations of political favoritism in the distribution of COVID-19 vaccine, Ojea decried the fact that politics were allowed to play a role in vaccine distribution. He said it "must have a universal scope, no one should be left without it, and those who are responsible for essential care deserve to receive it first".
