= Diocese of Chascomús =

Catholic ecclesiastical territory

Coordinates: 35.5798°S 58.0137°W

Diocese of Chascomús Dioecesis Chascomusensis Diócesis de Chascomús

Catholic

Location
- Country: Argentina
- Ecclesiastical province: La Plata
- Metropolitan: La Plata

Statistics
- Area: 27,115 km^{2} (10,469 sq mi)
- Population: Total; Catholics: (as of 2023); 408,000; 358,900 (88.0%)
- Parishes: 27

Information
- Denomination: Catholic Church
- Sui iuris church: Latin Church
- Rite: Roman Rite
- Established: 27 March 1980; 46 years ago
- Cathedral: Cathedral of Our Lady of Mercy in Chascomús
- Patron saint: Virgin of Mercy; St John the Baptist
- Secular priests: 22 (19 Diocesan, 3 Religious Orders)

Current leadership
- Pope: Leo XIV
- Bishop: Juan Liébana
- Metropolitan Archbishop: Gustavo Oscar Carrara
- Auxiliary Bishops: José María Baliña
- Bishops emeritus: Carlos Humberto Malfa

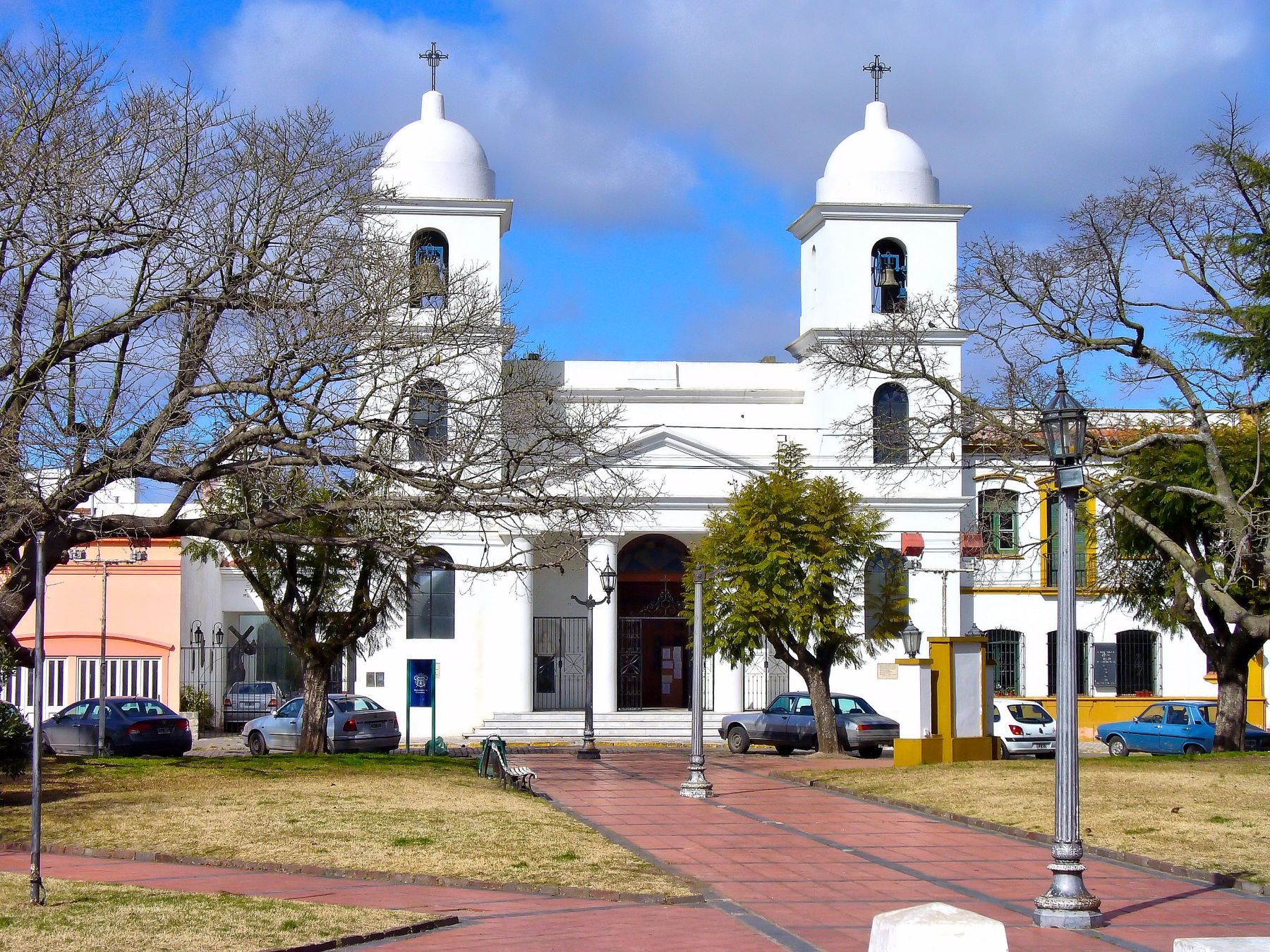
Front view of the Chascomús Cathedral, "Our Lady of Mercy".

The Roman Catholic Diocese of Chascomús (Latin: Dioecesis Chascomusensis) is in Argentina and is a suffragan of the Archdiocese of La Plata.

== History ==
On 27 March 1980, Blessed John Paul II established the Diocese of Chascomús from the Archdiocese of La Plata and the Diocese of Mar del Plata.

== Ordinaries ==
=== Bishops of Chascomús ===
- Rodolfo Bufano † (1980–1982), appointed bishop of San Justo
- José María Montes † (1983–1996), retired
- Juan Carlos Maccarone † (1996–1999), appointed bishop of Santiago del Estero
- Carlos Humberto Malfa (2000–2024), retired
- Juan Liébana (2024–Present)

=== Auxiliary Bishop ===
- José María Baliña (2025-Present)
