= Mario Mestril =

Cuban Roman Catholic bishop (1940–2026)

The Most Reverend Mario Mestril
- Bishop Emeritus of Ciego de Ávila
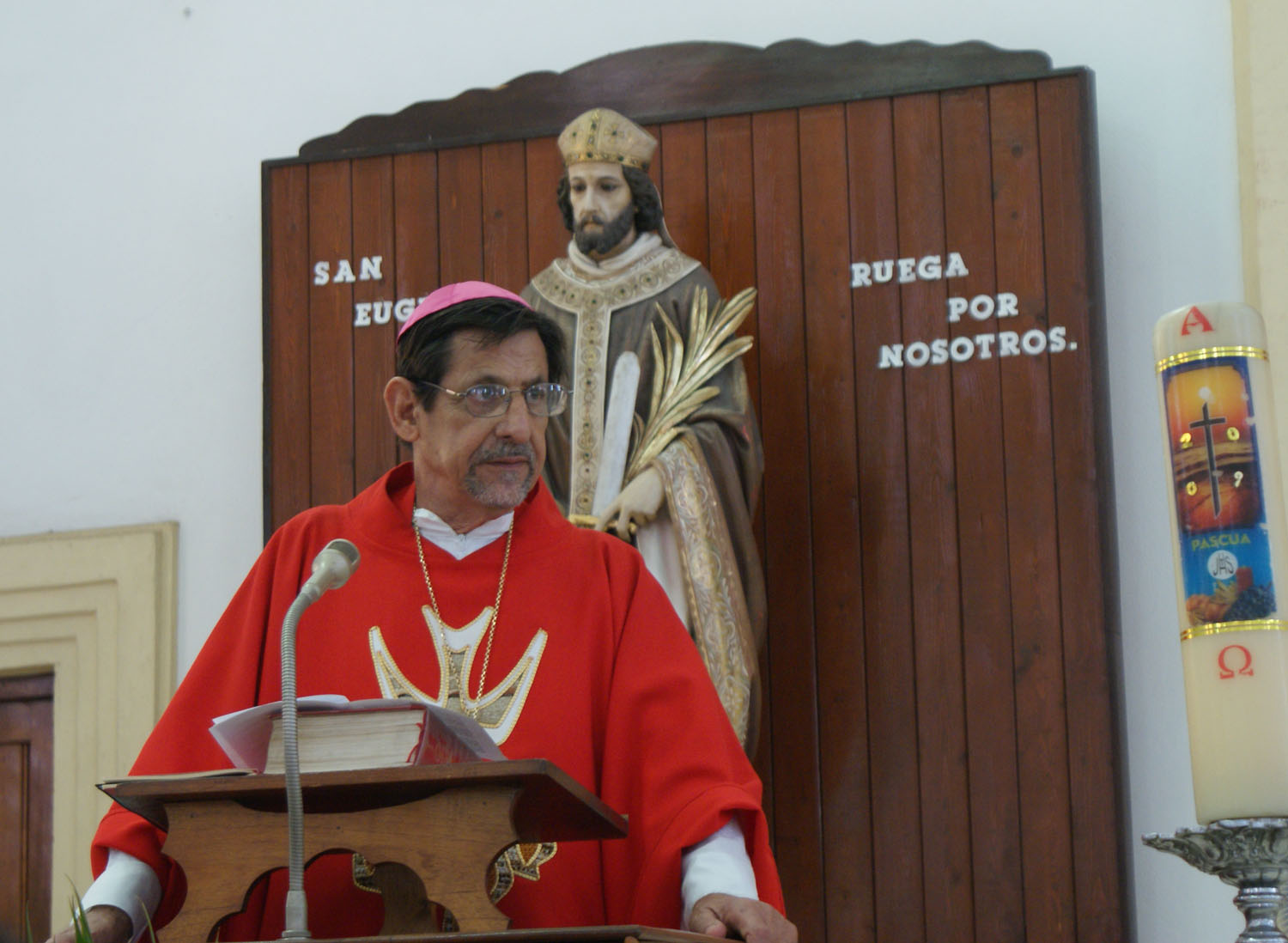
- Church: Catholic Church
- Archdiocese: Camagüey
- Diocese: Ciego de Ávila
- Appointed: 2 February 1996
- Term ended: 8 July 2017
- Predecessor: Diocese established
- Successor: Juan Gabriel Díaz Ruiz
- Previous posts: Auxiliary Bishop of Camagüey and Titular Bishop of Cediae (1991–1996)

Orders
- Ordination: 4 August 1964
- Consecration: 9 February 1992 by Adolfo Rodríguez Herrera, Faustino Sainz Muñoz and Pedro Claro Meurice Estiu

Personal details
- Born: 5 March 1940 Nuevitas, Camagüey Province, Cuba
- Died: 1 October 2026 (aged 86) Cuba
- Motto: Dominus pascit me et nihil mihi deerit

Mario Eusebio Mestril Vega (5 March 1940 – 1 October 2026) was a Cuban Roman Catholic prelate who served as the first bishop of Ciego de Ávila from 1996 until his retirement in 2017. He had previously served as an auxiliary bishop of the Archdiocese of Camagüey and titular bishop of Cediae from 1991 to 1996.

== Early life and priesthood ==
Mestril Vega was born in Nuevitas, Cuba, on 5 March 1940. (Note: L'Osservatore Romano gives his date of birth as 6 March 1940, while Catholic-Hierarchy and CiberCuba give 5 March 1940.) He was ordained a priest on 4 August 1964 for the Archdiocese of Camagüey and began his priestly ministry in his home diocese.

== Episcopate ==
On 16 November 1991, Pope John Paul II appointed Mestril Vega titular bishop of Cediae and auxiliary bishop of Camagüey.

Mestril Vega was consecrated a bishop on 9 February 1992. The principal consecrator was Adolfo Rodríguez Herrera, Bishop of Camagüey, with Apostolic Nuncio Faustino Sainz Muñoz and Pedro Meurice Estiu, Archbishop of Santiago de Cuba, as co-consecrators.

On 2 February 1996, Pope John Paul II established the Diocese of Ciego de Ávila and appointed Mestril Vega as its first bishop. The establishment of the diocese marked the creation of a new ecclesiastical jurisdiction in central Cuba, with Ciego de Ávila as its episcopal see.

He served as bishop of Ciego de Ávila for more than two decades. He was the diocese's first bishop and remained in office until 2017.

== Retirement ==
On 8 July 2017, Pope Francis accepted Mestril Vega's resignation from the pastoral governance of the Diocese of Ciego de Ávila and appointed Juan Gabriel Díaz Ruiz as his successor. Mestril Vega thereafter became bishop emeritus.

== Death ==
Mestril Vega died on 1 October 2026, at the age of 86. The Conference of Catholic Bishops of Cuba announced his death on 2 October and recalled his ministry as priest and bishop.

In the period preceding his death, the Diocese of Ciego de Ávila reported that his health had deteriorated rapidly and that he required intensified medical care.

== Notes ==
Catholic Church titles
Preceded by Diocese established	Bishop of Ciego de Ávila; 1996–2017	Succeeded by Juan Gabriel Díaz Ruiz
Preceded by Carlos Walter Galán Barry	Titular Bishop of Cediae; 1991–1996	Succeeded by Fidel Herráez Vegas
Preceded by —	Auxiliary Bishop of Camagüey; 1991–1996	Succeeded by —
