= Tomás Juan Carlos Solari =

- Archbishop of La Plata
- Church: Catholic Church
- Archdiocese: Archdiocese of La Plata
- In office: 20 September 1948 – 13 May 1954
- Predecessor: Juan Pascual Chimento
- Successor: Antonio José Plaza
- Previous posts: Titular Bishop of Aulon (1943-1948); Auxiliary Bishop of Buenos Aires (1943-1948)

Orders
- Ordination: 19 April 1924
- Consecration: 11 November 1943 by Santiago Copello

Personal details
- Born: 26 March 1899 Buenos Aires, Federal District, Argentina
- Died: 13 May 1954 (aged 55)

Tomás Juan Carlos Solari (26 March 1899 – 13 May 1954) was an Argentine prelate of the Roman Catholic Church. He served as auxiliary bishop of Buenos Aires from 1943 till 1948, when he became archbishop of La Plata.

== Life ==
Born in Buenos Aires, Solari was ordained to the priesthood on 19 April 1924.

On 23 August 1943, he was appointed auxiliary bishop of Buenos Aires and titular bishop of Aulon. Solari received his episcopal consecration on the following 11 November from Santiago Luis Cardinal Copello, archbishop of Buenos Aires, with the auxiliary bishop of Buenos Aires, Antonio Rocca, and the auxiliary bishop of Buenos Aires, Miguel de Andrea, serving as co-consecrators.

On 20 September 1948, he was appointed archbishop of La Plata, where he was installed on 11 November that year.

As a bishop he was principal consecrator of bishop Enrique Rau.

He died on 13 May 1954.
