= Hugo Manuel Salaberry Goyeneche =

Argentine Catholic bishop (born 1952)

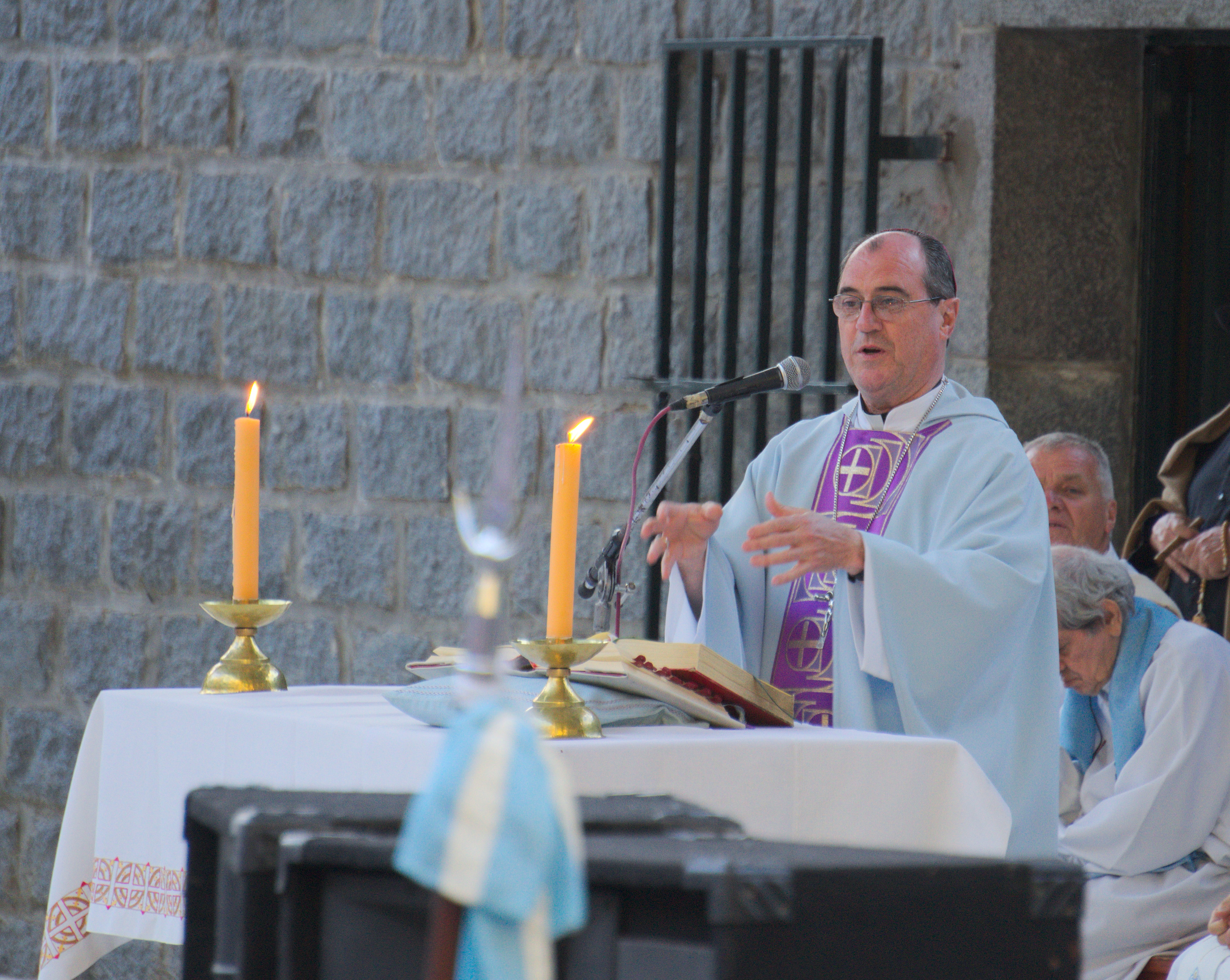

Hugo Manuel Salaberry Goyeneche S.J. (March 7, 1952) is an Argentine prelate of the Roman Catholic Church. He serves as 5th bishop diocesan of Diocese of Azul since 2006.

== Life ==
Born in San Andrés de Giles, Salaberry Goyeneche was ordained to the priesthood on December 3, 1985. He became a member of the Society of Jesus on August 15, 1989.

On May 24, 2006, he was appointed bishop of Azul. Salaberry Goyeneche received his episcopal consecration on the following August 21 from Jorge Mario Bergoglio, archbishop of Buenos Aires, the later pope Francis, with bishop emeritus of Azul, Emilio Bianchi di Cárcano, and archbishop of Bahía Blanca, Guillermo José Garlatti, serving as co-consecrators.
