= Gustavo Oscar Carrara =

Catholic prelate (born 1973)

His Excellency Gustavo Oscar Carrara
- Metropolitan Archbishop of La Plata in Argentina
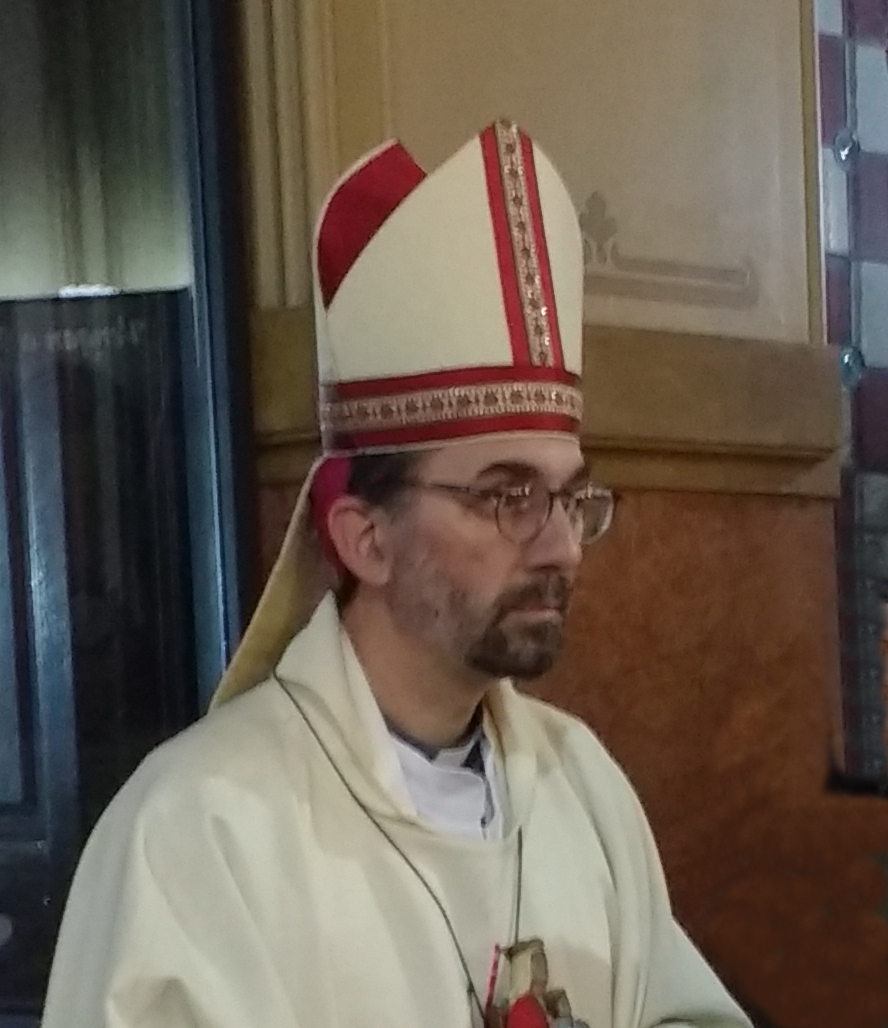
- Carrara in 2018
- Church: Roman Catholic Church
- Archdiocese: La Plata in Argentina
- See: La Plata in Argentina
- Appointed: 21 November 2024
- Predecessor: Gabriel Antonio Mestre
- Other post: Titular Bishop of Thasbalta (2017–2024)

Orders
- Ordination: 24 October 1998 by Jorge Mario Bergoglio
- Consecration: 16 December 2017 by Mario Aurelio Poli

Personal details
- Born: Gustavo Oscar Carrara; 24 May 1973 (age 53) Buenos Aires, Argentina
- Motto: Share with the poor the joy of the Gospel

His Excellency. The Most Reverend. Monsignor. Gustavo Oscar Carrara (born 24 May 1973) is a prelate of the Roman Catholic Church. He has been appointed Metropolitan Archbishop-designate of La Plata in Argentina. He has served as an auxiliary bishop of Buenos Aires since 2017 to 2024.

== Life ==
Born in Buenos Aires, Carrara was ordained to the priesthood on 24 October 1998 by Jorge Mario Bergoglio, archbishop of Buenos Aires, the future Pope Francis.

On 20 November 2017, he was appointed auxiliary bishop of Buenos Aires and titular bishop of Thasbalta. Carrara received his episcopal consecration on 16 December from Mario Aurelio Poli, archbishop of Buenos Aires, with bishop of San Isidro, Óscar Vicente Ojea Quintana, titular archbishop and rector of the Pontifical Catholic University of Argentina, Víctor Manuel Fernández, auxiliary bishop of Buenos Aires, Joaquín Mariano Sucunza, and auxiliary bishop of Buenos Aires, Ernesto Giobando, serving as co-consecrators.

On 21 November 2024, he was appointed metropolitan archbishop of La Plata.

== See also ==
- Catholic Church in Argentina
