= Cediae =

Ancient city and former bishopric in Roman North Africa

Cediae (Cediæ) was an ancient city and former bishopric in Roman North Africa. It is now a Latin Catholic titular see.

== History ==
The city of Cediæ was situated in modern Oum-Kif, in present Algeria. It was important enough in the Roman province of Numidia (in the papal sway) to become one its many suffragan sees, but like most faded completely, plausibly at the seventh century advent of Islam.

The first record of the diocese, from 256, mentions bishop Secondinus, partaking in the council called at Carthage in 256 by Saint Cyprianus on 'lapsed Christians', who accept forced idolatry to avoid martyrdom; he died a martyr himself at Cirta in 259, mentioned in the Vetus Martyrologium Romanum under 29 April. Francesco Lanzoni believes him identical to the saint Secondinus venerated throughout southern Italy.

Later Cediae adhered to the heresy Donatism, like its bishop Fortis, participant at the council called in Carthage in 484 by king Huneric of the Vandal Kingdom, where it had no Catholic counterpart, and probably exiled afterward like most Catholic bishops.

The last recorded bishop, Secundus, may still have been Donatist.

Archeological digs found remnants of a basilica, probably from the Donatist period, and numerous sarcophagi, one of which is inscribed with a dedication of the church to bishop Secundus.

== Titular see ==
The diocese was nominally restored in 1933 as Latin Catholic titular bishopric of Cediæ (Latin) / Cedie (Curiate Italian) / Cedien(sis) (Latin adjective).

It has had the following incumbents, so far of the fitting Episcopal (lowest) rank:

- Nicolas Stam, Mill Hill Missionaries (M.H.M.) (born Netherlands) (1936.03.09 – death 1949.05.26) as Apostolic Vicar of Kisumu (Kenya) (1936.03.09 – retired 1946) and on emeritate
- Ladislav Hlad (1950.02.09 – death 1979.12.16) (born Czechoslovakia) without prelature
- Carlos Walter Galán Barry (1981.02.11 – 1991.05.08) as Auxiliary Bishop of Diocese of Morón (Argentina) (1981.02.11 – 1991.05.08), later Metropolitan Archbishop of La Plata (Argentina) (1991.05.08 – retired 2000.06.12); died 2003
- Mario Eusebio Mestril Vega (1991.11.16 – 1996.02.02) as Auxiliary Bishop of Diocese of Camagüey (Cuba) (1991.11.16 – 1996.02.02), later first Bishop of Ciego de Ávila (Cuba) (1996.02.02 – 2017.07.08)
- Fidel Herráez Vegas (1996.05.14 – 2015.10.30) as Auxiliary Bishop of Archdiocese of Madrid (Spain) (1996.05.14 – 2015.10.30), later Metropolitan Archbishop of Burgos (Spain) (2015.10.30 – ...)
- Wojciech Tomasz Osial (2015.12.24 – ...), Auxiliary Bishop of Diocese of Łowicz (Poland) (2015.12.24 – ...), no previous prelature.

== See also ==
- List of Catholic dioceses in Algeria

== Sources and external links ==
- GCatholic (titular) see - data for all sections

Bibliography

- Pius Bonifacius Gams, Series episcoporum Ecclesiae Catholicae, Leipzig, 1931, p. 465
- Stefano Antonio Morcelli, Africa christiana, Volume I, Brescia 1816, pp. 132–133
- Joseph Mesnage, L'Afrique chrétienne, Paris, 1912, pp. 346–347
- J. Ferron, lemma 'Cedias' in Dictionnaire d'Histoire et de Géographie ecclésiastiques, vol. XII, Paris, 1953, coll. 43-44
- H. Jaubert, Anciens évêchés et ruines chrétiennes de la Numidie et de la Sitifienne, in Recueil des Notices et Mémoires de la Société archéologique de Constantine, vol. 46, 1913, pp. 29–30
