= Gabriel Antonio =

Gabriel Antonio may refer to:

- Gabriel Antonio Mestre, Argentine prelate
- Gabriel Antonio Pereira, Uruguayan politician
