= Diocese of Azul =

Latin Catholic territory in Argentina

Coordinates: 36.7779°S 59.8640°W

Diocese of Azul Dioecesis Azulensis Diócesis de Azul

Catholic
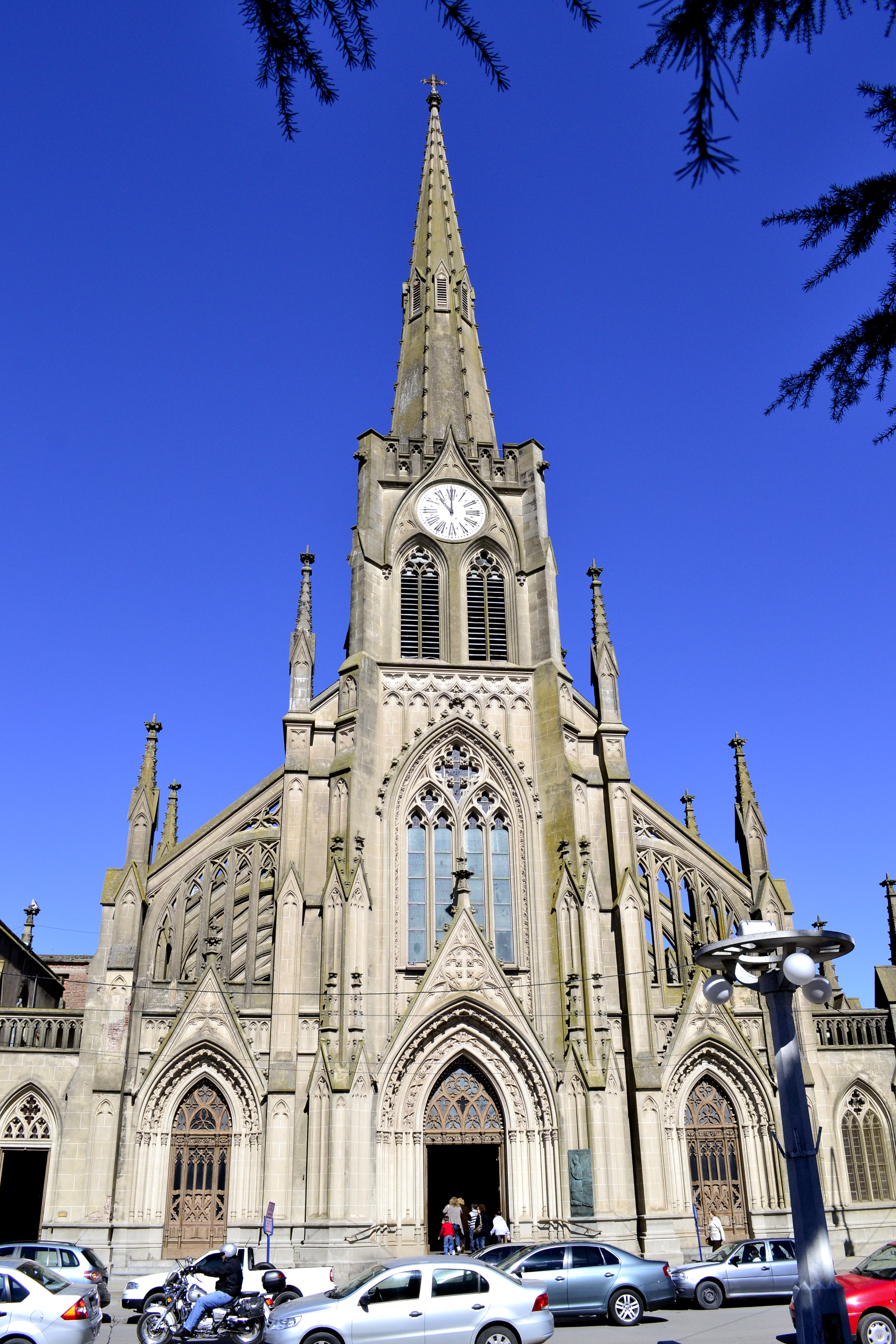
- Cathedral of Our Lady of the Rosary

Location
- Country: Argentina
- Ecclesiastical province: La Plata
- Metropolitan: La Plata

Statistics
- Area: 64,210 km^{2} (24,790 sq mi)
- Population: Total; Catholics: (as of 2012); 504,000; 428,000 (84.9%)
- Parishes: 43

Information
- Denomination: Catholic Church
- Sui iuris church: Latin Church
- Rite: Roman Rite
- Established: 20 April 1934 (92 years ago)
- Cathedral: Cathedral of Our Lady of the Rosary in Azul
- Patron saint: St Serapion of Algiers; Our Lady of the Rosary

Current leadership
- Pope: Leo XIV
- Bishop: Hugh Manuel Salaberry
- Metropolitan Archbishop: Héctor Rubén Aguer

Map
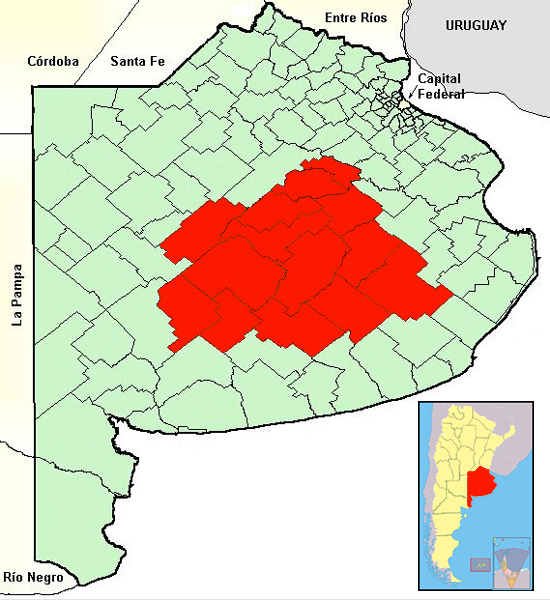

The Diocese of Azul (Latin: Dioecesis Azulensis) is a Latin Church diocese of the Catholic Church in Argentina and is a suffragan diocese of the Archdiocese of La Plata.

== History ==
On 20 April 1934, Pope Pius XI established the Diocese of Azul from the Diocese of La Plata. In 1957 territory was taken from this diocese to form the Diocese of Nueve de Julio.

== Bishops ==
=== Ordinaries ===
- César Antonio Cáneva (1934–1953)
- Antonio José Plaza (1953–1955), appointed Archbishop of La Plata
- Manuel Marengo (1956–1982)
- Emilio Bianchi di Cárcano (1982–2006)
- Hugh Manuel Salaberry, S.J. (2006–present)

=== Auxiliary bishops ===
- Antonio José Plaza (1950–1953), appointed Bishop here
- Emilio Bianchi di Cárcano (1976–1982), appointed Bishop here

== Territorial losses ==
Year	Along with	To form
1957	Diocese of Mercedes	Diocese of Nueve de Julio
