= List of Catholic dioceses in Cuba =

The Catholic Church in Cuba comprises three ecclesiastical provinces each headed by an archbishop. The provinces are in turn subdivided into 9 dioceses and 3 archdiocese each headed by a bishop or an archbishop.

== List of Dioceses ==
=== Ecclesiastical province of San Cristobal de la Habana ===
- Archdiocese of San Cristóbal de la Habana
  - Diocese of Matanzas
  - Diocese of Pinar del Rio

=== Ecclesiastical province of Santiago de Cuba ===
- Archdiocese of Santiago de Cuba
  - Diocese of Guantánamo-Baracoa
  - Diocese of Holguín
  - Diocese of Santísimo Salvador de Bayamo y Manzanillo

=== Ecclesiastical province of Camagüey ===
- Archdiocese of Camagüey
  - Diocese of Ciego de Avila
  - Diocese of Cienfuegos
  - Diocese of Santa Clara
