= Juan Nepomuceno Terrero y Escalada =

Juan Nepomuceno Terrero y Escalada (August 13, 1850 – January 10, 1921) was a prelate of the Roman Catholic Church. He served as auxiliary bishop of Buenos Aires from 1898 till 1900, when he became bishop of La Plata.

== Life ==
Born in Buenos Aires, Terrero y Escalada was ordained to the priesthood on December 18, 1880.

On April 21, 1898, he was appointed auxiliary bishop of Buenos Aires and titular bishop of Dercos. Terrero y Escalada received his episcopal consecration on the following June 19 from Uladislao Castellano, archbishop of Buenos Aires, with the bishop of La Plata, Mariano Antonio Espinosa, and the Vicar Apostolic of Méndez y Gualaquiza in Ecuador, Santiago Costamagna, serving as co-consecrators.

On December 12, 1900, he was appointed bishop of La Plata, where he was installed on March 3, 1901.

He died on January 10, 1921.
