= Diocese of San Rafael =

Catholic ecclesiastical territory

Diocese of San Rafael Dioecesis Fororaphaëliensis Diócesis de San Rafael

Catholic

Location
- Country: Argentina
- Ecclesiastical province: Mendoza
- Metropolitan: Mendoza

Statistics
- Area: 87,286 km^{2} (33,701 sq mi)
- Population: Total; Catholics: (as of 2004); 230,000; 195,500 (85%)
- Parishes: 28

Information
- Denomination: Roman Catholic
- Rite: Roman Rite
- Established: 10 April 1961 (65 years ago)
- Cathedral: Cathedral of St Raphael the Archangel in San Rafael
- Patron saint: St Raphael the Archangel; Our Lady of Lourdes; Saint Joseph

Current leadership
- Pope: Leo XIV
- Bishop: Sede vacante
- Metropolitan Archbishop: Marcelo Daniel Colombo
- Apostolic Administrator: Marcelo Fabián Mazzitelli
- Bishops emeritus: Carlos María Domínguez, O.A.R. Eduardo Maria Taussig

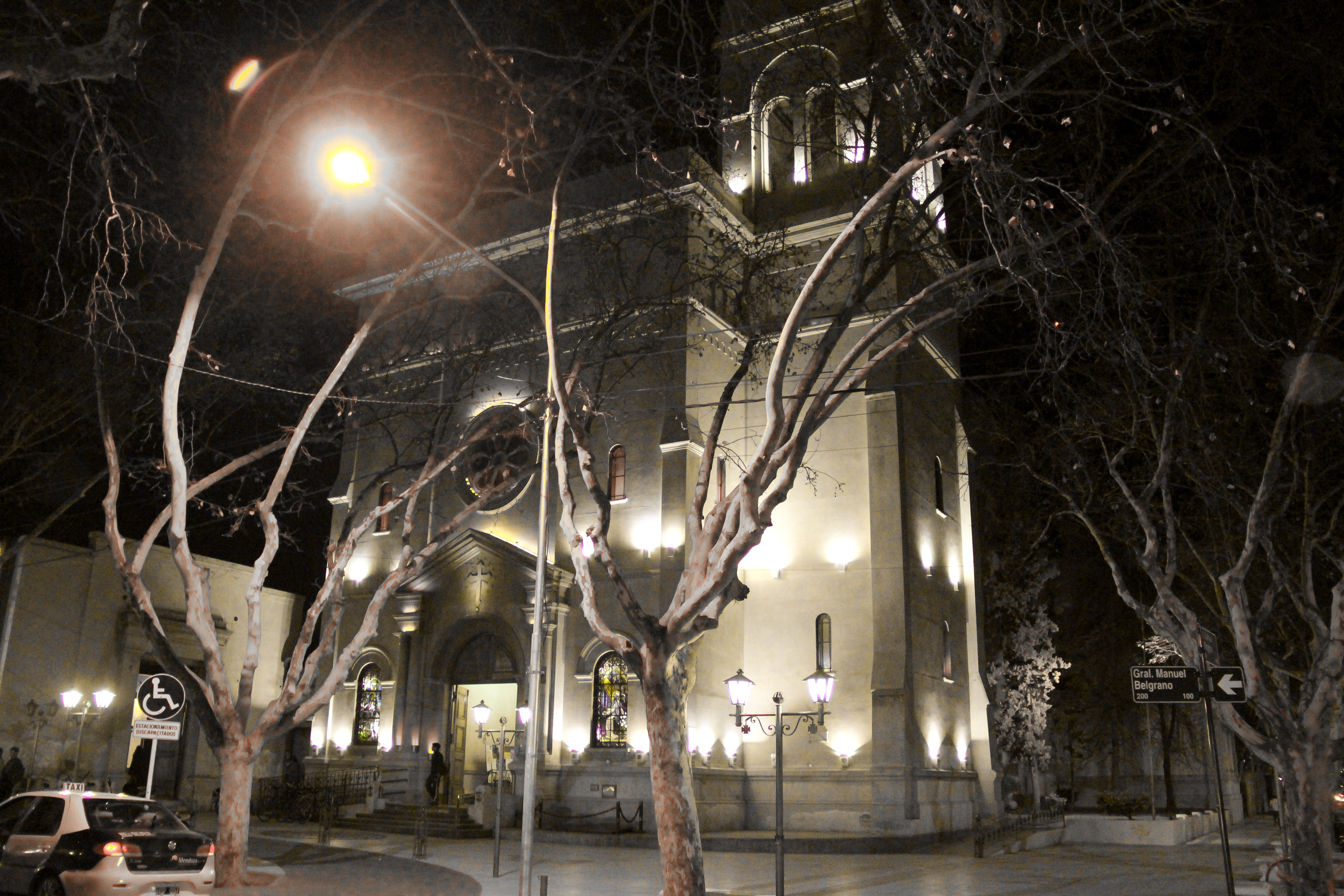
The Cathedral of San Rafael in the night.

The Diocese of San Rafael (Latin: Dioecesis Fororaphaëliensis) is a Roman Catholic diocese in San Rafael, Argentina. It came into existence on 10 April 1961.

== Bishops ==
=== Past and present ordinaries ===
- Raúl Francisco Primatesta (1961–1965), appointed Archbishop of Córdoba
- Jorge Carlos Carreras (1965–1969) appointed Bishop of San Justo
- Oscar Félix Villena (1970–1972), resigned
  - Apostolic Administrator Olimpio Maresma (1972–1973)
- León Kruk (1973–1991)
- Jesús Arturo Roldán (1991–1996)
  - Apostolic Administrator Cándido Rubiolo (1996–1997)
- Guillermo José Garlatti (1997–2003), appointed Archbishop of Bahía Blanca
- Eduardo Maria Taussig (2004–2022), resigned
  - Apostolic Administrator Carlos María Domínguez, O.A.R. (2022–2023, see below)
- Carlos María Domínguez, O.A.R. (2023–2025), resigned
  - Apostolic Administrator Marcelo Fabián Mazzitelli (2025–Present)

=== Other priest of this diocese who became bishop ===
- Pedro Daniel Martínez Perea, appointed Coadjutor Bishop of San Luis in 2009
