= St. Catherine of Ricci Cathedral =

- Catedral de Santa Catalina de Ricci
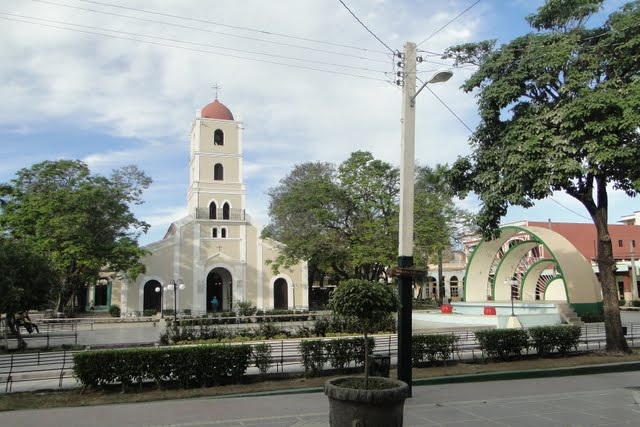
- St. Catherine of Ricci Cathedral
- Location: Guantánamo
- Country: Cuba
- Denomination: Roman Catholic Church

Administration
- Diocese: Roman Catholic Diocese of Guantánamo-Baracoa

The St. Catherine of Ricci Cathedral (Spanish: Catedral de Santa Catalina de Ricci) also called Guantánamo Cathedral is a religious building affiliated with the Catholic Church and is located in front of the Martí Park in the city of Guantánamo, in the homonymous province on the Caribbean island nation of Cuba.

The construction of the cathedral began in 1837 and briefly paralyzing being restarted in 1839 and was blessed in 1842 when Cuba was still under the rule of the Spanish Empire. In 1953 he was added a tower and between 1959 and 1960 were made major repairs.

Follow the Roman or Latin rite and is the principal church of the Diocese of Guantánamo-Baracoa (Dioecesis Guantanamensis-Baracoensis) created in 1998 by bull Spirituali christifidelium of Pope John Paul II.

== See also ==
- List of cathedrals in Cuba
- Roman Catholicism in Cuba
- St. Catherine of Ricci

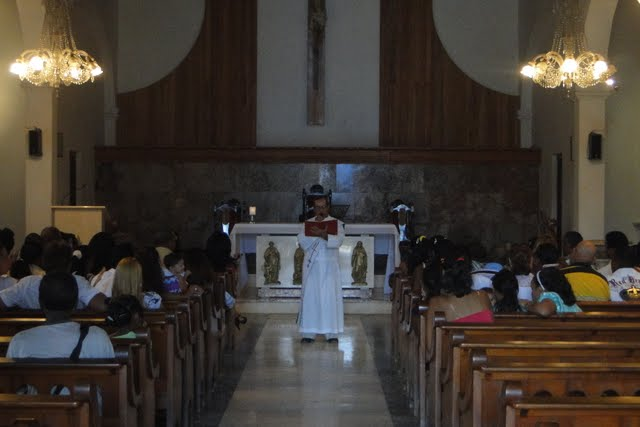
Internal view
