= Roman Catholic Archdiocese of La Plata =

Roman Catholic Archdiocese of La Plata or Archdiocese of La Plata may refer to:

- the current Roman Catholic Archdiocese of La Plata in Argentina
- the historical Roman Catholic Archdiocese of La Plata or Chacas in present Bolivia, now Metropolitan Roman Catholic Archdiocese of Sucré
