= St. Eugene's Cathedral, Ciego de Ávila =

St. Eugene's Cathedral
- Catedral de San Eugenio de la Palma
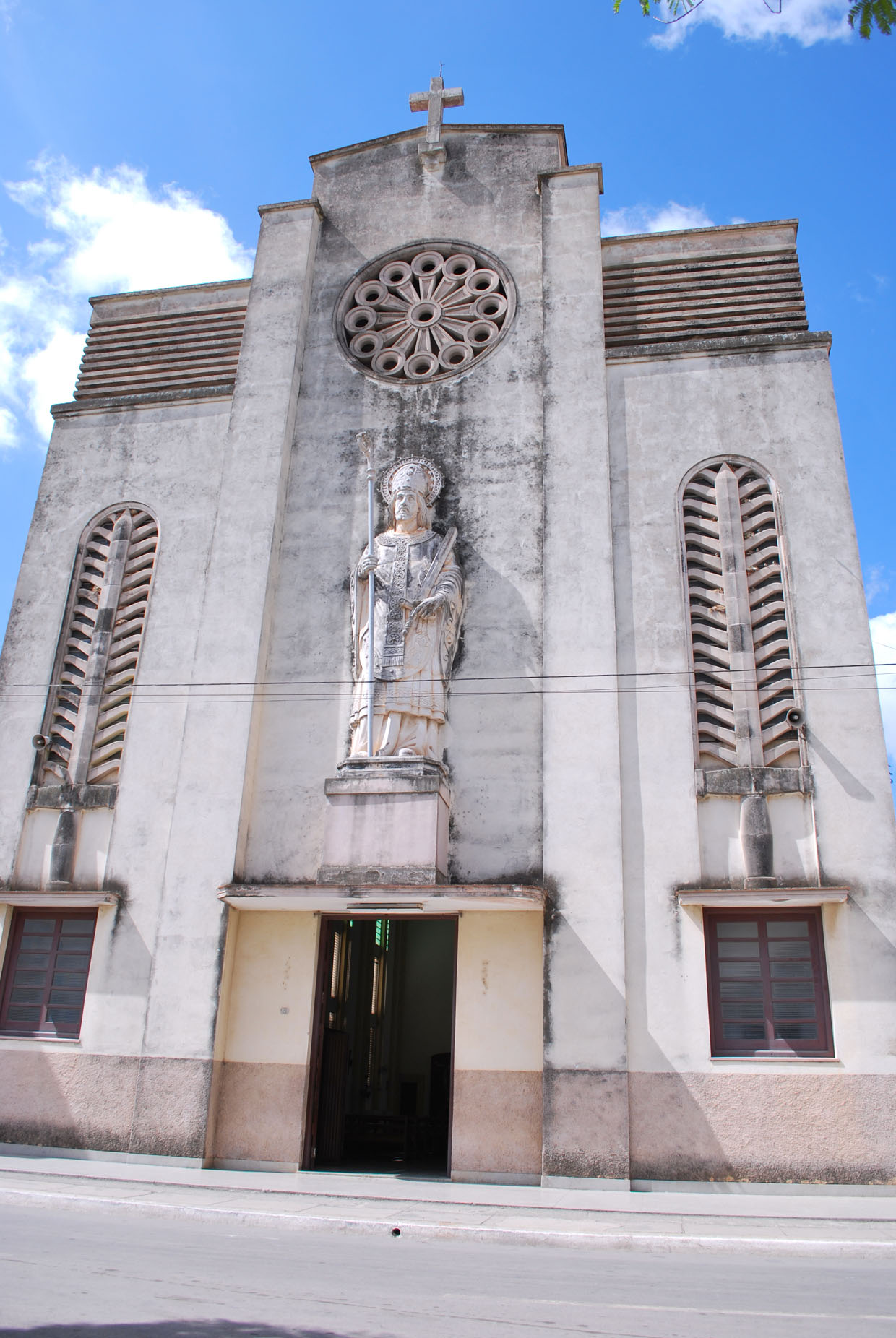
- St. Eugene's Cathedral
- Location: Ciego de Ávila
- Country: Cuba
- Denomination: Roman Catholic Church

Architecture
- Architectural type: church

Administration
- Diocese: Roman Catholic Diocese of Ciego de Ávila

St. Eugene's Cathedral (Spanish: Catedral de San Eugenio; Catedral de San Eugenio de la Palma), also called the Cathedral of Saint Eugene of the Palma or simply Cathedral of Ciego de Ávila, is Roman Catholic cathedral in the city of Ciego de Ávila, in Cuba, located on Independencia Avenue by José Martí Park.

== History ==
The first church built on the site dated to 1890. This building was demolished in 1947 to give space to a much larger church, designed by the architect Salvador Figueras, which opened in 1951. The church became a cathedral in 1996 as the seat of the newly-created Diocese of Ciego de Ávila. The church's most distinctive feature is its facade.

== See also ==
- List of cathedrals in Cuba
- Roman Catholicism in Cuba
