= Cienfuegos Cathedral =

Our Lady of the Immaculate Conception Cathedral
- Catedral de Nuestra Señora de la Purísima Concepción
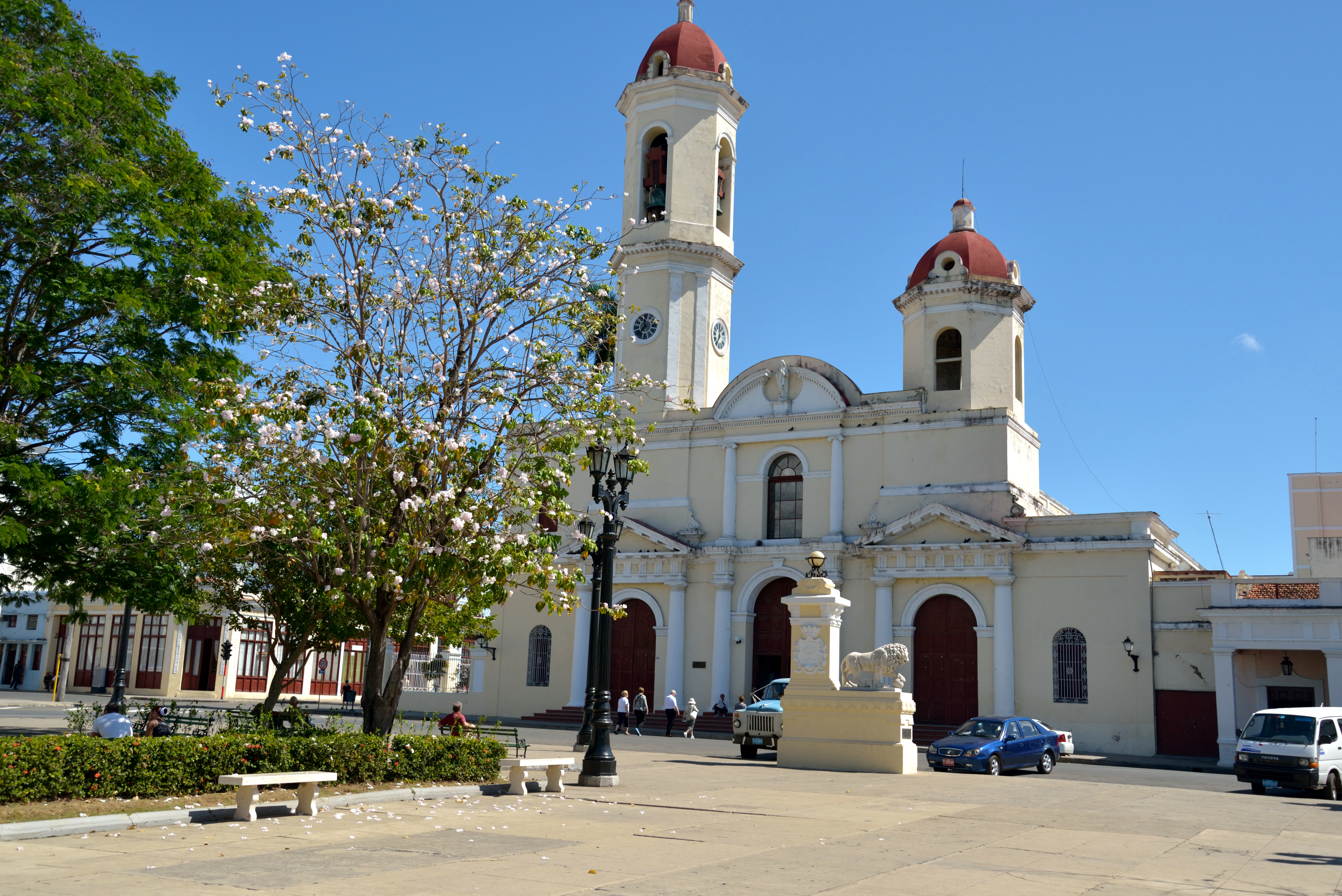
- Our Lady of the Immaculate Conception Cathedral
- 22.14606°N 80.45186°W
- Location: Cienfuegos
- Country: Cuba
- Denomination: Roman Catholic Church

Administration
- Diocese: Roman Catholic Diocese of Cienfuegos

The Our Lady of the Immaculate Conception Cathedral (Spanish: Catedral de Nuestra Señora de la Purísima Concepción) also called Cienfuegos Cathedral is a Catholic church is located opposite the Martí Park in the city of Cienfuegos in the province of the same name on the Caribbean island nation of Cuba.

Its parish archives date back to 1819 when the city was founded, at that time it belonged to Yagua and Guano. The original building was completed in 1833 during the Spanish colonization, but expansions and improvements occurred in 1850, between 1852 and 1861, between 1866 and 1869 and between 1869 and 1875. It became an official cathedral in on February 20, 1903, following the Roman or Latin rite and is the mother of the Diocese of Cienfuegos (Dioecesis Centumfocencis) that was created by Pope Leo XIII by the apostolic brief "Actum praeclare".

The cathedral is part of the Historic Centre of Cienfuegos and, along with other historic buildings in the city center, was designated a World Heritage Site by UNESCO in 2005, because of its outstanding Neoclassical architecture.

== Gallery ==
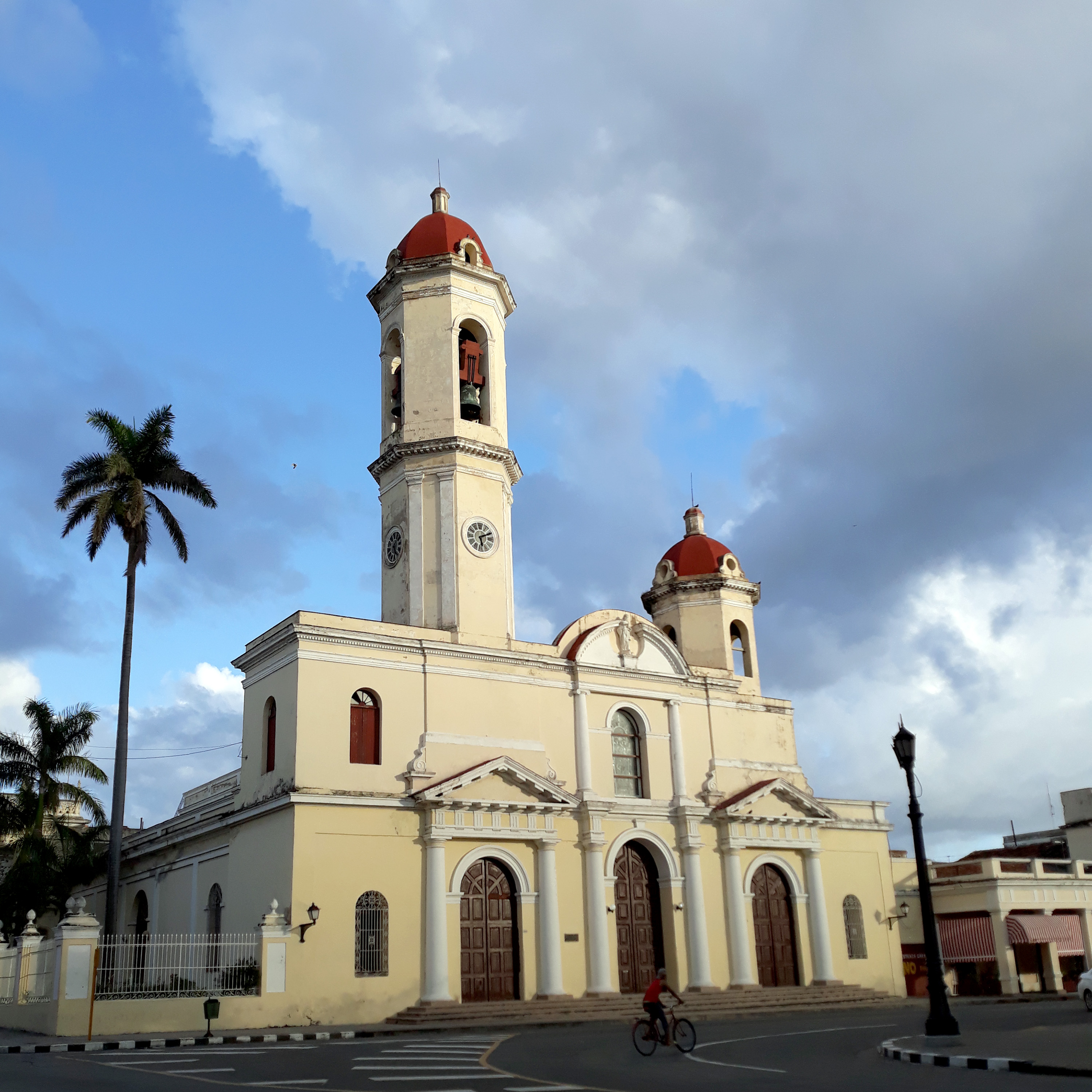
Cienfuegos Cathedral

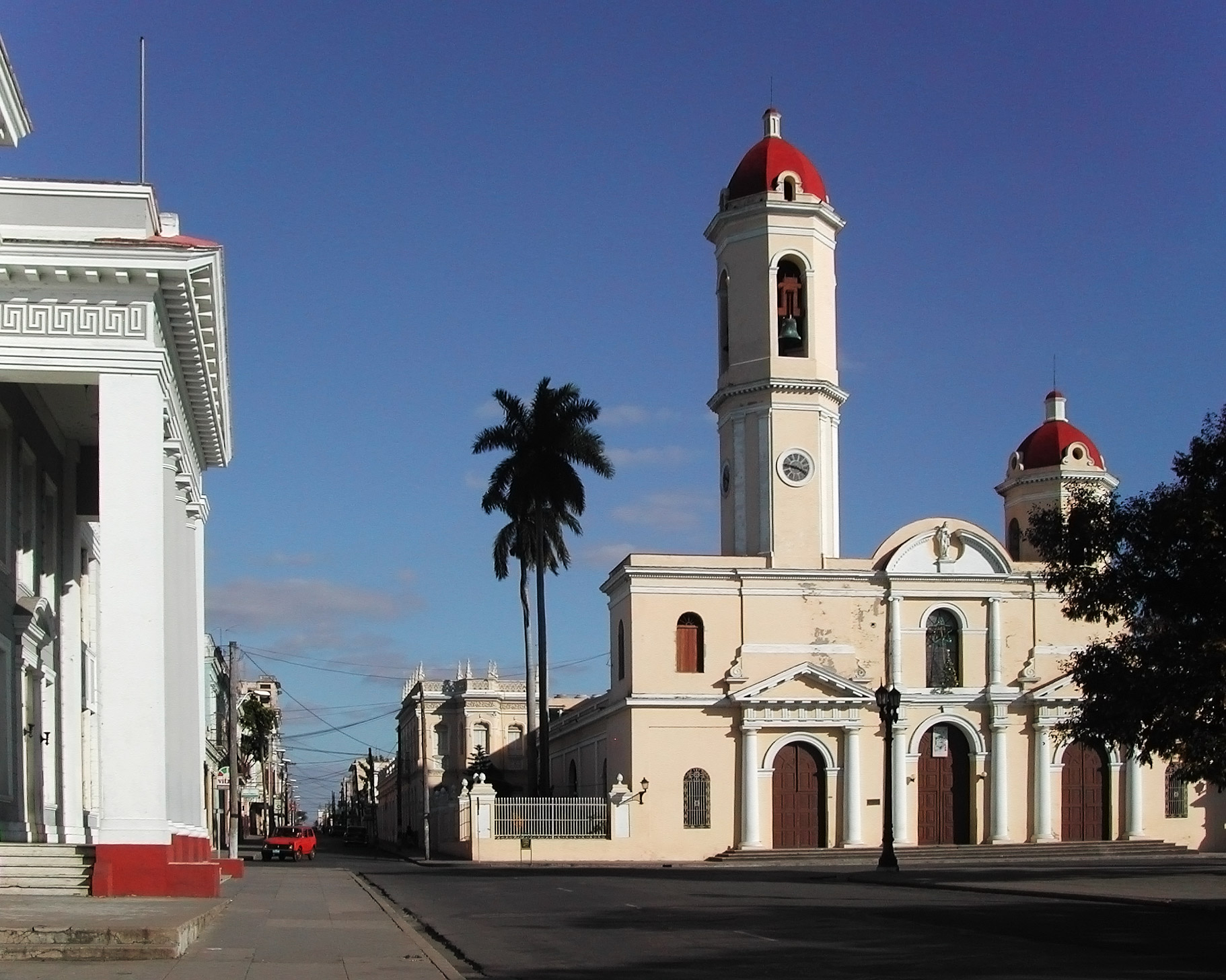
Another view of the cathedral

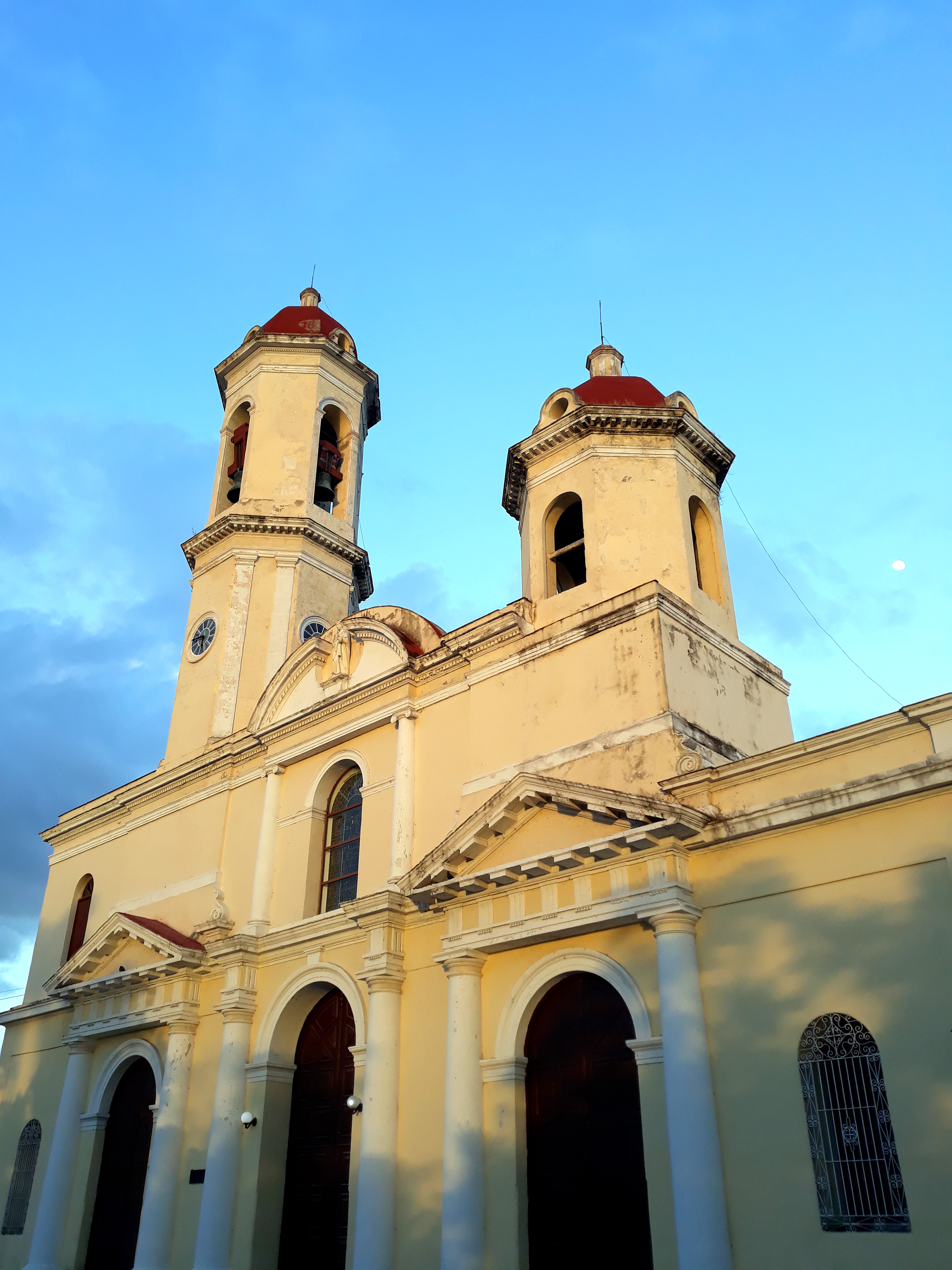
Closer view of architecture

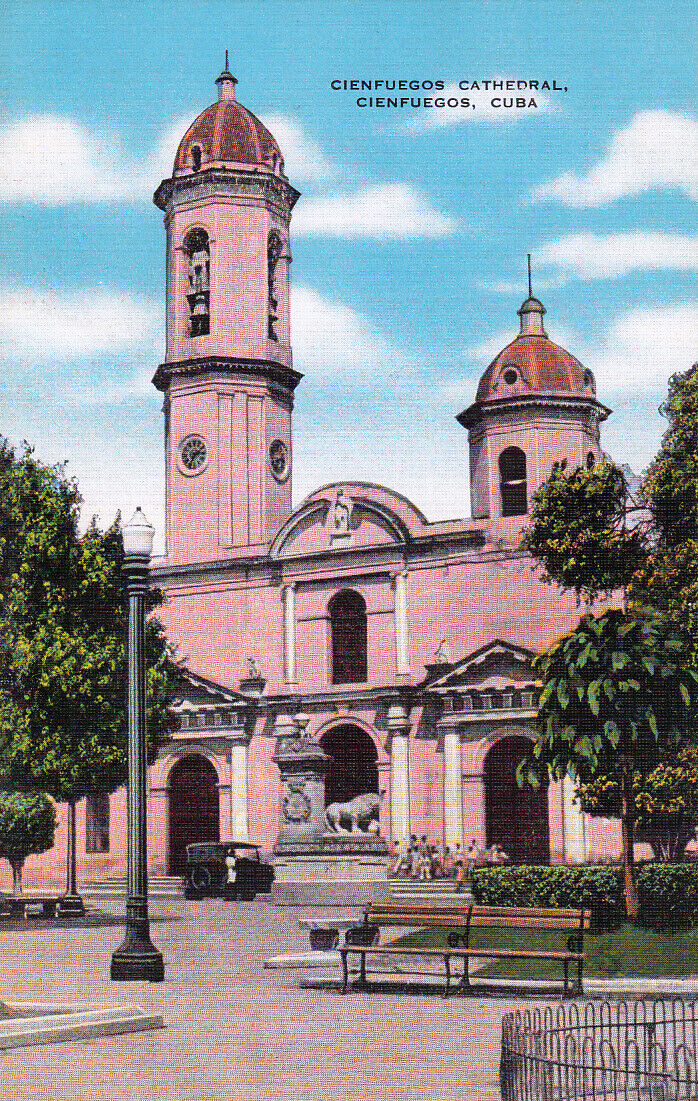
Cathedral in a postcard of 1935.

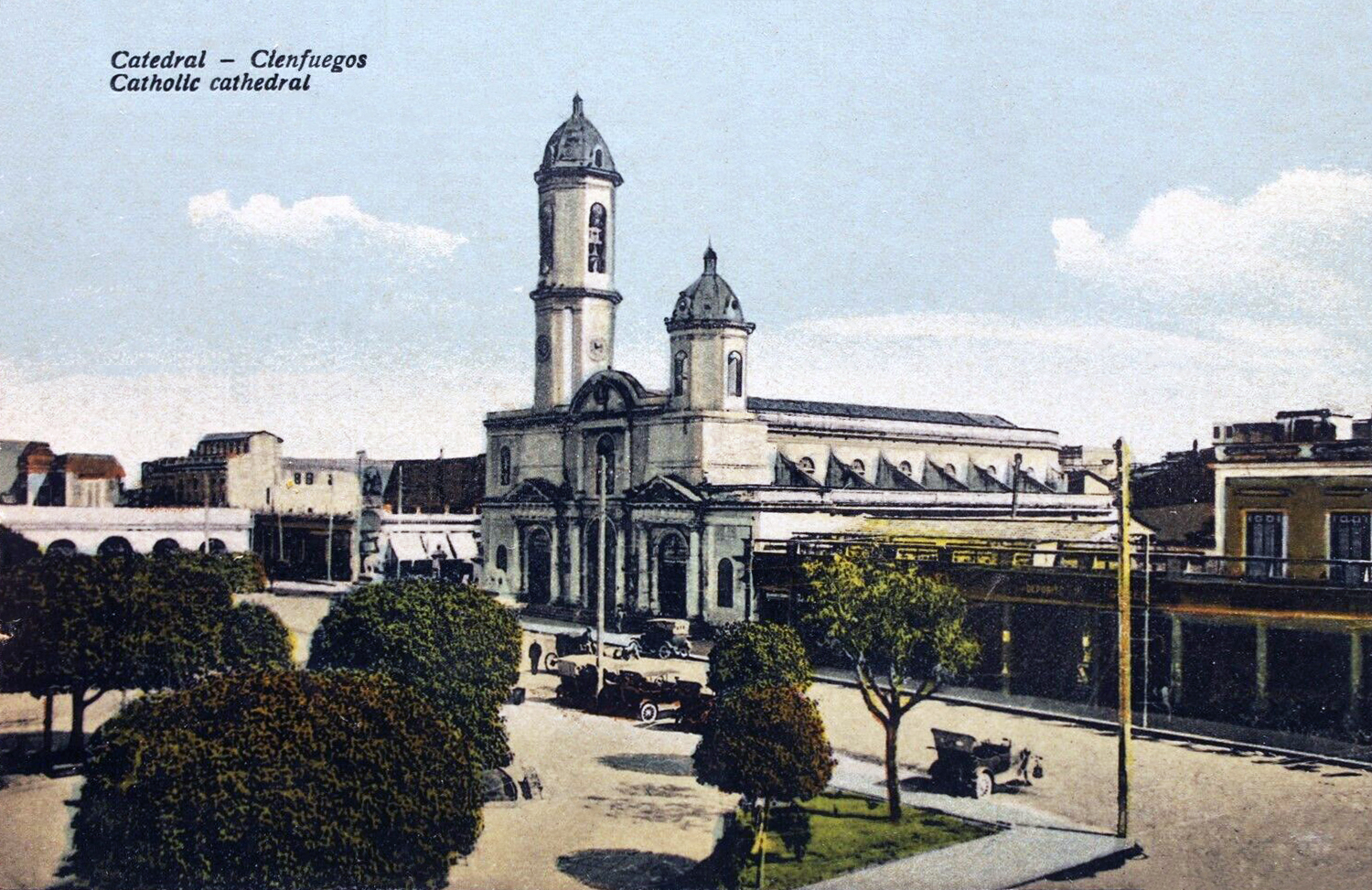
Cathedral of Cienfuegos, postcard of 1915.

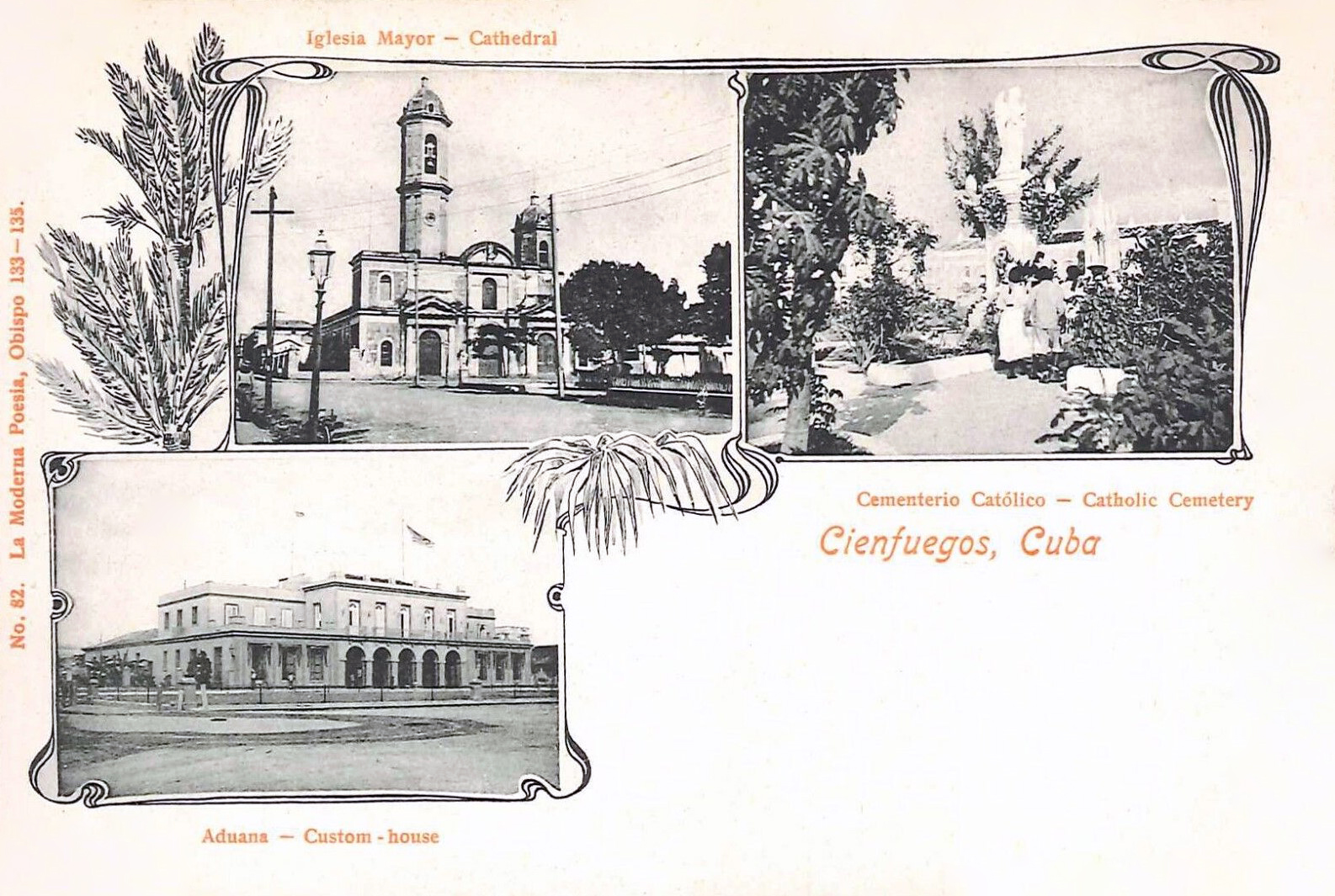
Cienfuegos Postal, in 1900.

== See also ==
- List of cathedrals in Cuba
- Roman Catholicism in Cuba
