= Roman Catholic Diocese of Ciego de Ávila =

Latin Catholic diocese in Cuba

Coordinates: 21.8414°N 78.7603°W

Diocese of Ciego de Avila Dioecesis Caeci Abulensis
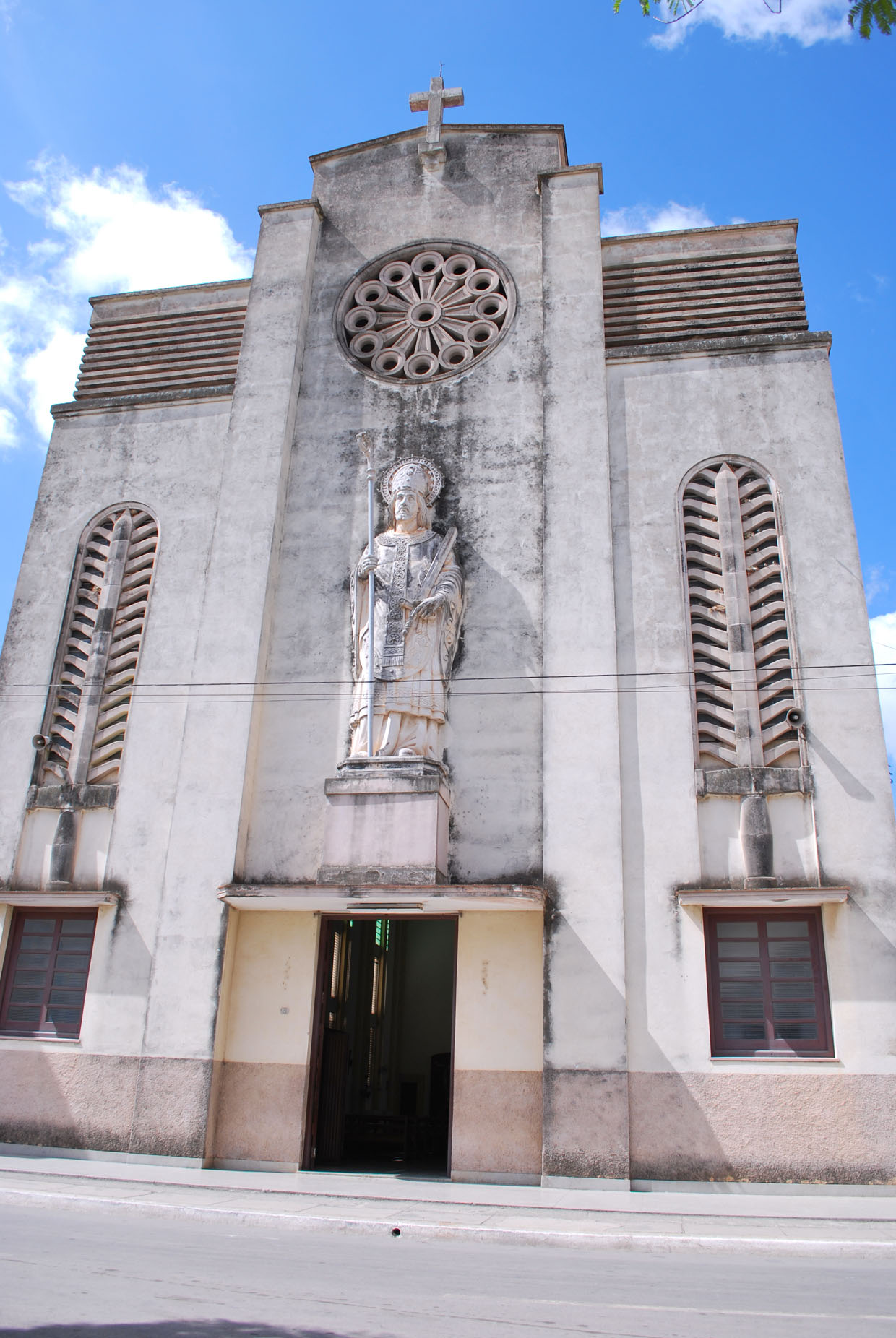

Location
- Country: Cuba
- Ecclesiastical province: Camagüey
- Metropolitan: Ciego de Avila

Statistics
- Area: 7,887 km^{2} (3,045 sq mi)
- Population: Total; Catholics: (as of 2006); 452,100; 186,900 (41.3%)
- Parishes: 4

Information
- Denomination: Catholic Church
- Sui iuris church: Latin Church
- Rite: Roman Rite
- Established: 10 December 1912 (113 years ago)
- Cathedral: Catedral de San Eugenio de la Palma

Current leadership
- Pope: Leo XIV
- Bishop: Sede vacante

Map

The Diocese of Ciego de Avila is a suffragan Latin Catholic diocese of the Metropolitan Archdiocese of Camagüey, in Cuba.

Its cathedral episcopal see is St. Eugene's Cathedral, Ciego de Ávila.

== History ==
- Established on 2 February 1996 as Diocese of Ciego de Ávila / Cæci Abulen(sis) (Latin), on Cuban territory split off from the then Diocese of Camagüey, now its Metropolitan.

== Statistics ==
As per 2015, it served 190,343 Catholics (40.9% of 465,628 total) on 7,887 km^{2} in 5 parishes and 36 missions with 8 priests (6 diocesan, 2 religious), 2 deacons, 18 lay religious (2 brothers, 16 sisters) and 1 seminarian.

== Episcopal ordinaries ==
(all Roman Rite)

Suffragan Bishops of Ciego de Ávila

- Mario Eusebio Mestril Vega (2 February 1996 - retired 2017.07.08), previously Titular Bishop of Cediæ (16 November 1991 – 2 February 1996) as Auxiliary Bishop of Camagüey (Cuba)
- Juan Gabriel Diaz Ruiz (8 July 2017 – 7 April 2022).

== See also ==
- List of Catholic dioceses in Cuba

== Sources and external links ==
- GCatholic, with Google satellite photo - data for all sections
- "Diocese of Ciego de Avila". Catholic-Hierarchy.
