= Gabriel Antonio Mestre =

Argentine Roman Catholic Archbishop

His Excellency, The Most Reverend, Mons. Don. Gabriel Antonio Mestre
- Metropolitan Archbishop Emeritus of La Plata
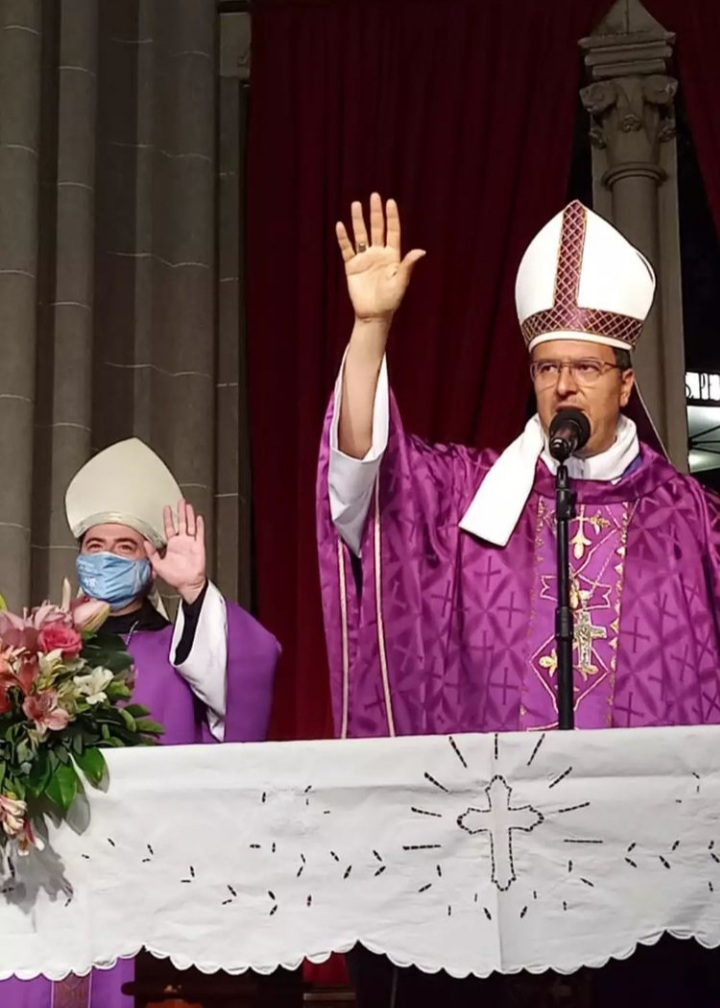
- Gabriel Mestre in 2021
- Church: Roman Catholic Church
- Archdiocese: La Plata
- Province: La Plata
- Metropolis: La Plata
- Appointed: July 2023
- Term ended: 2024
- Predecessor: Victor Manuel Fernandez
- Successor: Gustavo Oscar Carrara
- Previous post: Bishop of Mar del Plata (2017-2023)

Orders
- Consecration: August 2017

Personal details
- Born: Gabriel Antonio Mestre; September 15, 1968 (age 57) Mar de Plata, Argentina
- Denomination: Catholic Church
- Occupation: Archbishop, Prelate
- Motto: "Christ is our peace".

Gabriel Antonio Mestre (born 15 September 1968) is an Argentine Catholic prelate who served as Archbishop of La Plata from 2023 to 2024. He was Bishop of Mar del Plata from 2017 to 2023.

== Biography ==
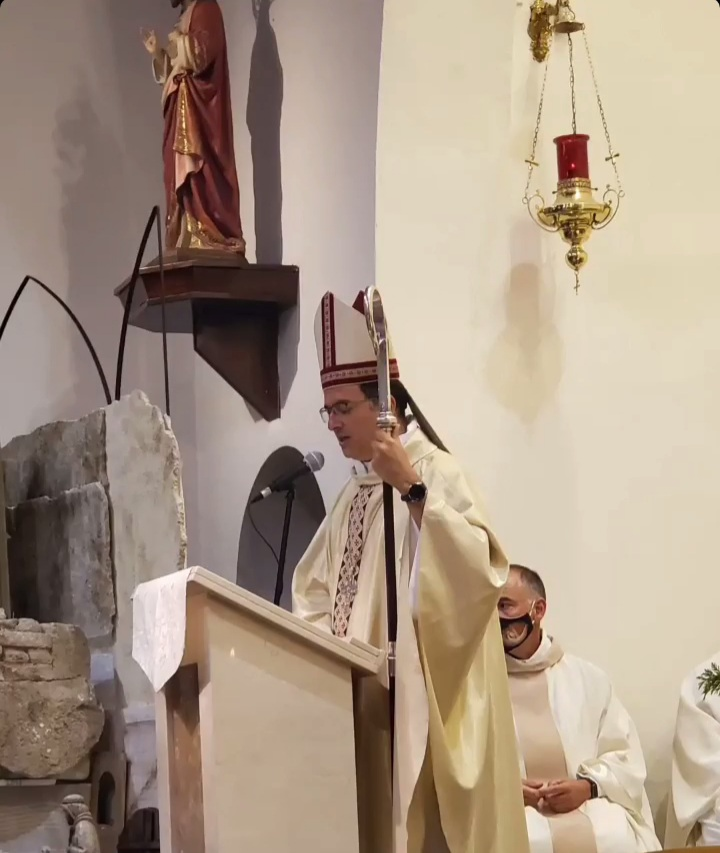
Mestre, 2021

Gabriel Antonio Mestre was born on 15 September 1968 in Mar del Plata, Argentina, to Cándido Mestre y Ana Luisa Gasparoli. He has one sister. After studying at local schools, he studied social work at the National University of Mar del Plata for a year. In 1989 he entered the San José Seminary, in La Plata. He obtained a licentiate in biblical theology from the Pontifical Catholic University of Argentina, while working in a local parish and living at the major seminary of Buenos Aires. He was ordained a priest of the Diocese of Mar del Plata on 16 May 1997 by José María Arancedo, Bishop of Mar del Plata.

He served as parish vicar of the cathedral from 1997 to 2000; parish priest of Asunción de la Virgen and chaplain of the Maternity Hospital of Mar del Plata from 2002 to 2010. He was also a member of the priests council and the college of consulters, vice rector and professor at the University School of Theology in Mar del Plata, and a founder and councillor of the diocesan secretariat for family pastoral care from 2010 to 2014. Within CELAM, he served as a member of the Biblical Pastoral Centre for Latin America and the Caribbean. From 2012 to 2017 he was vicar general and parish priest of the Cathedral of Mar del Plata.

On 18 July 2017, Pope Francis appointed him bishop of Mar del Plata. He was the first bishop there to be a native of Mar del Plata. He received his episcopal consecration on 16 August from Antonio Marino, Bishop Emeritus of Mar del Plata. He chose as his episcopal motto "Christ is our peace".

Within the Argentine Episcopal Conference, he was president of the Episcopal Commission for Catechesis, Animation and Biblical Pastoral Ministry.

On 28 July 2023, Pope Francis promoted him as Archbishop of La Plata. His was installed on 16 September. His resignation was accepted on 27 May 2024.
