= José María Montes =

- Bishop of Diocese of Chascomús Emeritus
- Church: Roman Catholic Church
- See: Diocese of Chascomús
- In office: 1983–1996
- Predecessor: Rodolfo Bufano
- Successor: Juan Carlos Maccarone

Orders
- Ordination: December 20, 1958

Personal details
- Born: March 22, 1920 Almirante Brown, Argentina
- Died: September 2, 2011 (aged 91)

José María Montes (March 22, 1920 – September 2, 2011) was an Argentine prelate of the Roman Catholic Church.

Montes was born in Almirante Brown, Argentina and was ordained a priest on December 20, 1958, from the Archdiocese of La Plata. He was appointed Auxiliary Archbishop of the Archdiocese of La Plata on June 15, 1978, as well as titular bishop of Lamdia, and was ordained bishop on August 15, 1978. Montes was appointed to the Diocese of Chascomús on January 19, 1983, where he served until his retirement on July 3, 1996.
