= List of cathedrals in Cuba =

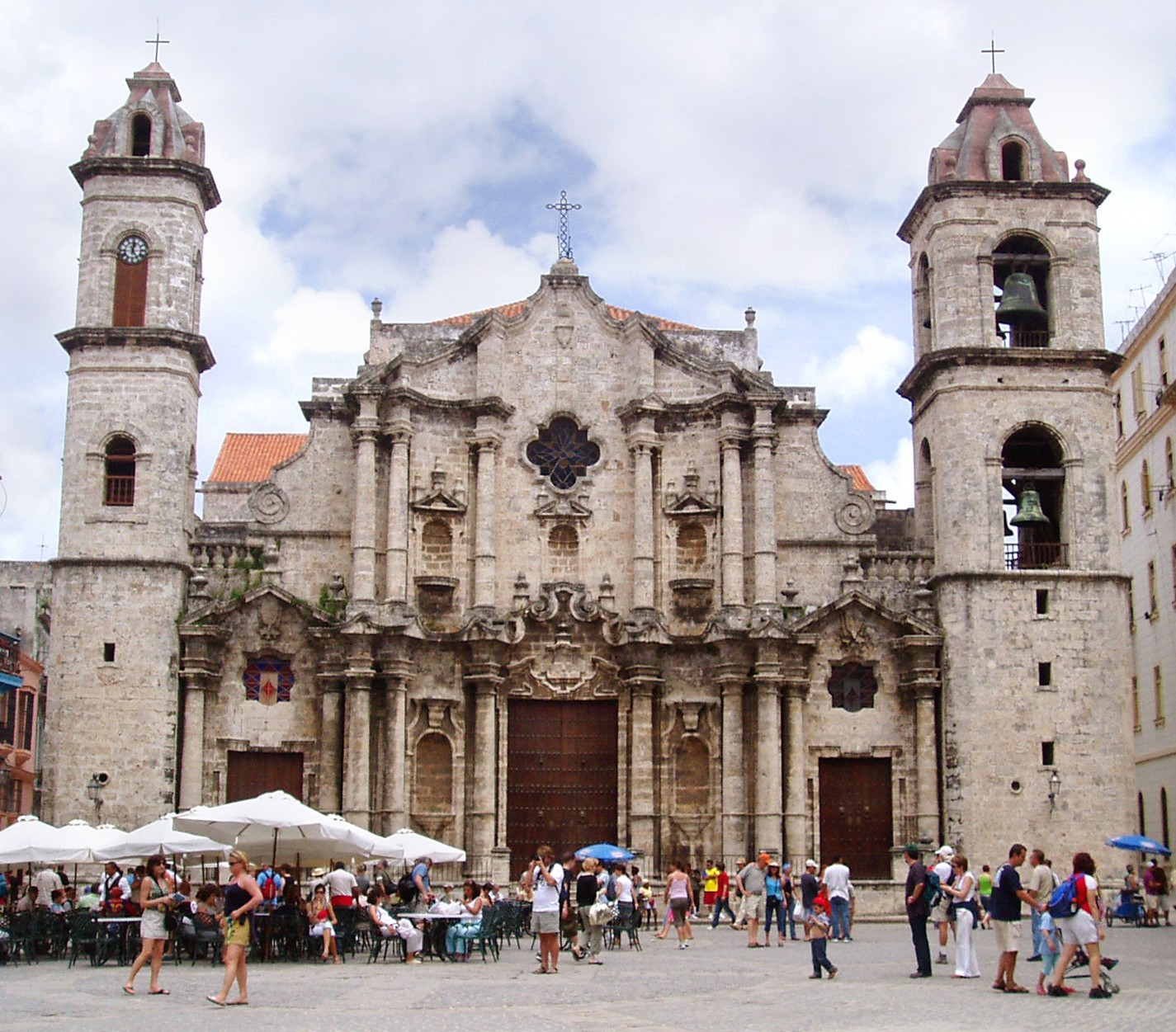
Catedral de San Cristobal in Havana

This is the list of cathedrals in Cuba sorted by denomination.

Location of cathedrals in Cuba
Roman Catholic
Anglican

== Catholic ==
Cathedrals of the Catholic Church in Cuba:

- Cathedral of Our Lady of Candelaria in Camagüey
- Cathedral of Saint Eugene of the Palma in Ciego de Avila
- Cathedral of Our Lady of the Immaculate Conception in Cienfuegos
- Cathedral of St. Catherine of Ricci in Guantánamo
- Cathedral of St. Isidore in Holguín
- Cathedral of St. Charles Borromeo in Matanzas
- Cathedral of San Rosendo in Pinar del Río
- Cathedral of St. Christopher in Havana
- Cathedral of St. Clare of Assisi in Santa Clara
- Cathedral Basilica of Our Lady of the Assumption in Santiago de Cuba
- Cathedral of the Holy Savior in Bayamo

== Eastern Orthodox ==
- Orthodox Cathedral of St. Nikolas of Myra in Havana (Ecumenical Patriarchate)
- Our Lady of Kazan Orthodox Cathedral in Havana (Russian Orthodox)

== Anglican ==
Cathedrals of the Episcopal Church of Cuba:

- Cathedral of the Holy Trinity in Havana

== See also ==
- Lists of cathedrals
- Christianity in Cuba
