= Diocese of Mar del Plata =

Catholic ecclesiastical territory

Diocese of Mar del Plata Dioecesis Maris Platensis Diócesis de Mar del Plata

Catholic

Location
- Country: Argentina
- Ecclesiastical province: La Plata
- Metropolitan: La Plata

Statistics
- Area: 22,895 km^{2} (8,840 sq mi)
- Population: Total; Catholics: (as of 2004); 827,732; 662,186 (80%)
- Parishes: 26

Information
- Denomination: Roman Catholic
- Rite: Roman Rite
- Established: 11 February 1957 (69 years ago)
- Cathedral: Cathedral Basilica of St Peter and St Cecilia in Mar del Plata
- Patron saint: Saint Cecilia

Current leadership
- Pope: Leo XIV
- Bishop: Ernesto Giobando
- Auxiliary Bishops: Dario Rubén Quintana, O.A.R.
- Bishops emeritus: Antonio Marino

Map
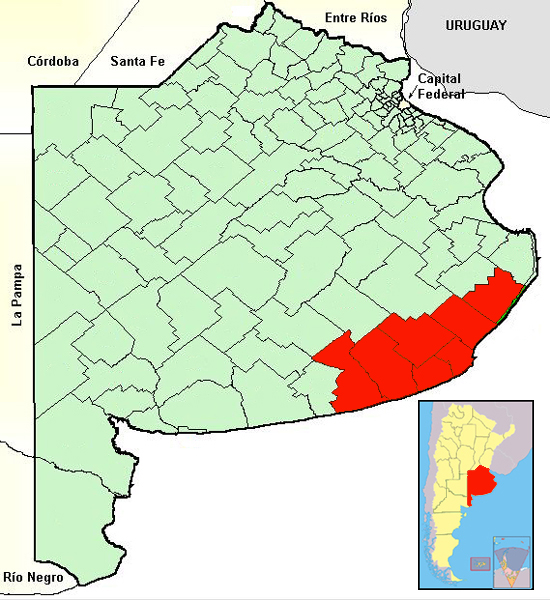

Website
- Website of the Diocese

The Roman Catholic Diocese of Mar del Plata (Latin: Dioecesis Maris Platensis) is in Argentina and is a suffragan of the Archdiocese of La Plata.

== History ==
On 11 February 1957, Pope Pius XII established the Diocese of Mar del Plata from the Diocese of Bahía Blanca and the Archdiocese of La Plata. Territory was taken from the diocese in 1980 to form the Diocese of Chascomús.

== Bishops ==
=== Ordinaries ===
- Enrique Rau (1957–1971)
- Eduardo Francisco Pironio (1972–1975), appointed titular Archbishop and Pro-Prefect of the Congregation for Religious and Secular Institutes (Cardinal in 1976)
- Rómulo García (1976–1991), appointed Archbishop of Bahía Blanca
- José María Arancedo (1991–2003), appointed Archbishop of Santa Fe de la Vera Cruz
- Juan Alberto Puiggari (2003–2010), appointed Archbishop of Paraná
- Antonio Marino (2011-2017)
- Gabriel Mestre (2017-2023), appointed Archbishop of La Plata
- José María Baliña (2023-2023), resigned due health reasons, not possessed
- Gustavo Manuel Larrazábal, C.M.F. (2023-2024), resigned, not possessed, reappointed as auxiliary bishop San Juan de Cuyo and Titular bishop of Buslacena.
- Ernesto Giobando (2024)

=== Auxiliary bishops ===
- Rómulo García (1975–1976), appointed Bishop here
- Dario Rubén Quintana, O.A.R. (2019-)

== Ministries ==
- Regional Council of Catholic Education (JUREC): Prebyster Juan Cruz Menilli Caldararo (2023–26)
- University Minister: Prebyster Lucas di Leva
- Vocations Ministry: Gabriela Verónica Tumini (2020–23)
- Family Ministry: Nora Cristina Pompa (2020–23)
- Addictions Ministry: Sandra Karina Vitali (2023–26)
- Council of Cultural Heritage: Analía Benítez

== Territorial losses ==
Year	Along with	To form
1980	Archdiocese of La Plata	Diocese of Chascomús
