= Jorge Mayer =

- Archbishop of Bahía Blanca
- Church: Catholic Church
- Archdiocese: Archdiocese of Bahía Blanca
- In office: 31 May 1972 – 31 May 1991
- Predecessor: Germiniano Esorto
- Successor: Rómulo García
- Previous post: Bishop of Santa Rosa in Argentina (1957-1972)

Orders
- Ordination: 23 March 1940
- Consecration: 9 June 1957 by Germiniano Esorto

Personal details
- Born: 20 November 1915 San Miguel Arcángel (southwest of Colonia Lapin), Buenos Aires Province, Argentina
- Died: 25 December 2010 (aged 95)

Jorge Mayer (20 November 1915 – 25 December 2010) was the Roman Catholic Archbishop of the Archdiocese of Bahía Blanca, Argentina from 1972 to 1991.

== Biography ==
Mayer was born in San Miguel Arcángel, Adolfo Alsina Partido, Buenos Aires Province; he was of Volga German descent. Ordained a priest on 24 March 1940, he was named bishop of the Diocese of Santa Rosa, La Pampa Province, on 9 July 1957. On 31 May 1972 Pope Paul VI appointed him Archbishop of Bahía Blanca, succeeding Germiniano Esorto.

He took over in a formal Mass on 21 July 1972 until he resigned to his Pastoral task on 31 May 1991, upon turning 80 years of age, as established by the Pope. He was succeeded by Rómulo García, becoming then Archbishop Emeritus, where he continued working actively as of 2006, despite his age. Mayer spoke both Spanish and German, as well as Italian, among other languages. During the 1980s and 1990s he led many groups of pilgrims from Bahía Blanca to Israel.

== See also ==
- Catholic Church in Argentina
