= Carlos Walter Galán Barry =

- Archbishop of La Plata
- Church: Catholic Church
- Archdiocese: Archdiocese of La Plata
- In office: 8 May 1991 – 12 June 2000
- Predecessor: Antonio Quarracino
- Successor: Héctor Aguer
- Previous posts: Titular Bishop of Cediae (1981-1991); Auxiliary Bishop of Morón (1981-1991)

Orders
- Ordination: 19 September 1953 by Antonio Rocca
- Consecration: 25 March 1981 by Raúl Francisco Primatesta

Personal details
- Born: 31 May 1925
- Died: 25 January 2003 (aged 77)

Carlos Walter Galán Barry (31 May 1925 – 25 January 2003) was a prelate of the Catholic Church. He served as auxiliary bishop of Morón from 1981 till 1991, when he became archbishop of La Plata, which he remained till his resignation in 2000 on reaching the age of 75.

== Life ==
Born in Nueve de Julio, Galán Barry was ordained to the priesthood on September 19, 1953.

On 11 February 1981, he was appointed auxiliary bishop of Buenos Aires and titular bishop of Cediae. Galán Barry received his episcopal consecration on the following March 25 from Raúl Francisco Cardinal Primatesta, archbishop of Córdoba, with the bishop of Morón, Justo Oscar Laguna, and the bishop of San Justo, Jorge Carlos Carreras, serving as co-consecrators.

On 8 May 1991, he was appointed archbishop of La Plata, where he was installed on the following July 27. He would serve in this position for nearly 9 years, retiring on 12 June 2000, upon reaching the age of 75.

As a bishop he was principal consecrator of Guillermo José Garlatti, archbishop of Bahía Blanca, and Martín de Elizalde, bishop of Nueve de Julio.

He died on 25 January 2003.
