= Guillermo José Garlatti =

- Archbishop Emeritus of Bahía Blanca
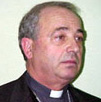
- Church: Catholic Church
- Archdiocese: Archdiocese of Bahía Blanca
- In office: 11 March 2003 – 12 July 2017
- Predecessor: Rómulo García
- Successor: Carlos Azpiroz Costa
- Previous posts: Bishop of San Rafael (1997-2003); Titular Bishop of Aquae Regiae (1994-1997); Auxiliary Bishop of La Plata in Argentina (1994-1997)

Orders
- Ordination: 5 July 1964
- Consecration: 30 November 1994 by Carlos Walter Galán Barry

Personal details
- Born: 12 July 1940 (age 86) Forgaria nel Friuli, Province of Udine, Kingdom of Italy

Styles of Guillermo José Garlatti
- Reference style: His Very Reverend Excellency
- Spoken style: Monsignor

Guillermo José Garlatti (born 12 July 1940, in Forgaria nel Friuli) is an Argentine prelate of the Catholic Church and was the archbishop of Bahía Blanca from 2004 to 2017. He has been a bishop since 1994.

== Biography ==
He was born in Forgaria nel Fiurle, Udine, Northern Italy on 12 July 1940. His parents moved with him to La Plata, Argentina when he was a child, where he completed his primary and secondary education. He is fluent in Spanish, Italian and Latin.

He studied at the local seminary, and was ordained a priest on 5 July 1964, at St. Cajetan Church. He obtained a degree in Theology at Universidad Católica Argentina and served as Prefect at St. Joseph Seminary.

He moved to Jerusalem where he completed biblical studies, which he then taught at the Pontifical Biblical Institute in Rome.

He was ordained a bishop in 1994 with title to the ancient see at Acque Regie and serving as auxiliary bishop of the Archdiocese of La Plata. On 20 February 1997, he was named bishop of San Rafael in Mendoza Province, Argentina.

On 11 March 2003, he was named Archbishop of the Archdiocese of Bahía Blanca, succeeding Rómulo García, taking his seat on 10 May 2004. He is an active member of the Argentine National Episcopal Conference. His received his pallium from Pope John Paul II in Saint Peter's Square on 28 June 2004.

== See also ==
- Roman Catholicism in Argentina
