= Víctor Manuel Fernández =

Argentine Catholic prelate and theologian (born 1962)

His Eminence Víctor Manuel Fernández
- Prefect of the Dicastery for the Doctrine of the Faith
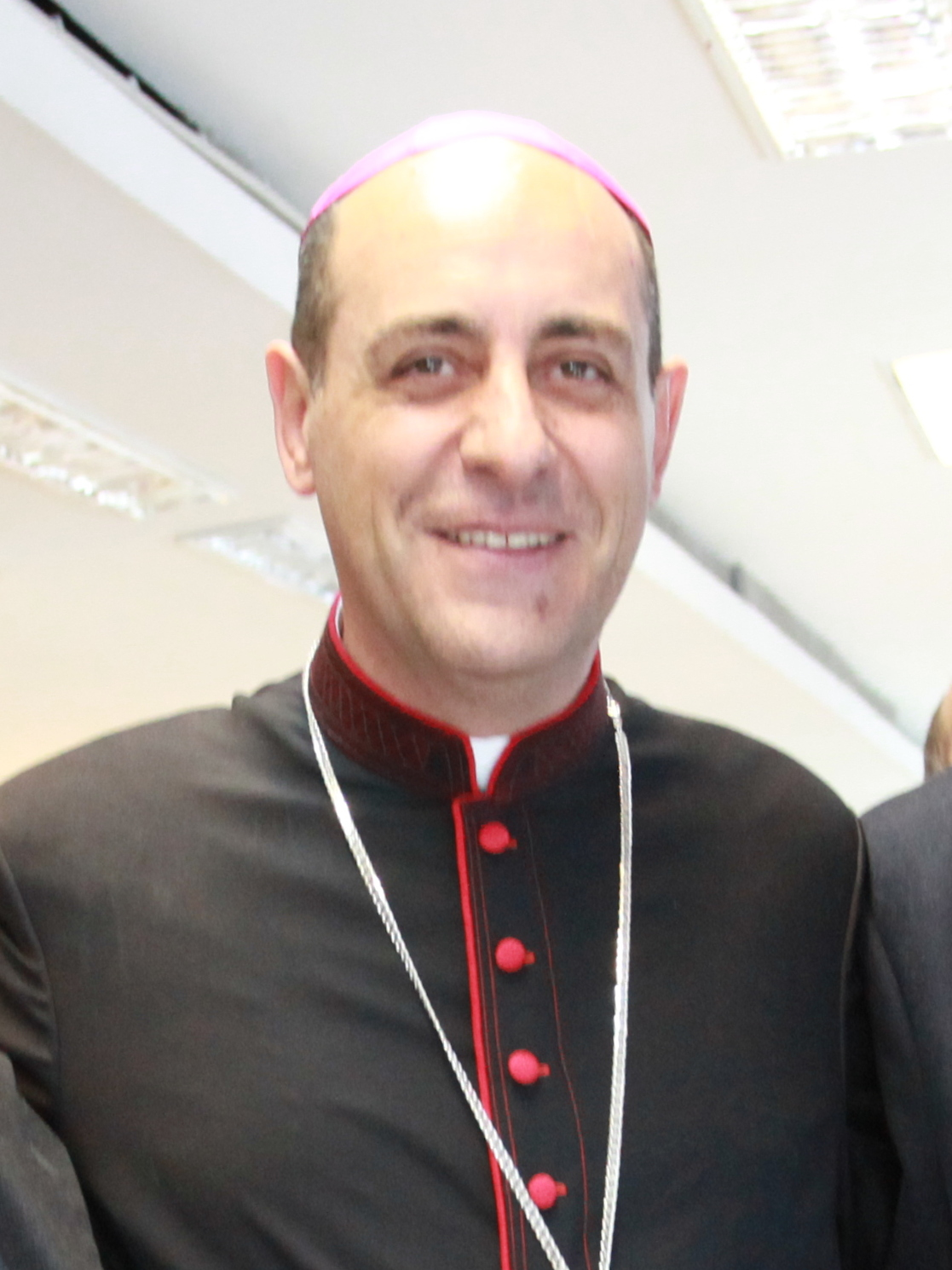
- Fernández in 2013
- Church: Latin Church
- Appointed: 1 July 2023
- Installed: 15 September 2023
- Predecessor: Luis Ladaria Ferrer
- Other post: Cardinal-Deacon of Santi Urbano e Lorenzo a Prima Porta (2023–present)
- Previous posts: Rector of the Pontifical Argentine Catholic College (2009–18); Titular Archbishop of Tiburnia (2013–18); Archbishop of La Plata (2018–23)

Orders
- Ordination: 15 August 1986 by Adolfo Roque Esteban Arana
- Consecration: 15 June 2013 by Mario Aurelio Poli
- Created cardinal: 30 September 2023 by Pope Francis
- Rank: Cardinal Deacon

Personal details
- Born: 19 July 1962 (age 64) Alcira Gigena, Córdoba, Argentina
- Education: Pontifical Gregorian University; Pontifical Catholic University of Argentina
- Motto: En medio de tu pueblo (Spanish for 'Your servant is here among the people') —1 Kings 3:8–10
- Styles
- Reference style: His Eminence
- Spoken style: Your Eminence
- Religious style: Cardinal
- Informal style: Cardinal

Víctor Manuel Fernández (born 18 July 1962) is an Argentine prelate of the Latin Church and a theologian. He is currently the head of the Dicastery for the Doctrine of the Faith.

Fernández served as rector of the Pontifical Catholic University of Argentina from December 2009 to April 2018. He was named Archbishop of La Plata on 2 June 2018. On 1 July 2023, Pope Francis named Fernández prefect of the Dicastery for the Doctrine of the Faith as of mid-September. Pope Francis made Fernández a cardinal on 30 September 2023.

== Early life and career ==
Fernández was born on 18 July 1962 in Alcira Gigena, in Córdoba Province. His father, Emilio, was a shopkeeper who supported Raúl Alfonsín, a radical political leader. Fernández entered the seminary in 1978. He was ordained as a deacon on 21 December 1985, and to the priesthood on 15 August 1986 for the Roman Catholic Diocese of Villa de la Concepción del Río Cuarto. After his ordination, he went to Rome where he studied Biblical theology at the Pontifical Gregorian University, graduating with a Licentiate of Sacred Theology (STL) in 1988. He returned to Argentina to undertake a doctorate in the Faculty of Theology of the Catholic University of Argentina, which he completed in 1990.

His early career was focused on catechesis, lay formation and working at his diocese's seminary. He served as formator and director of studies at the seminary of Río Cuarto from 1988 to 1993 and from 2000 to 2007. In the intervening years, between 1993 and 2000, he was the parish priest of Parish of Santa Teresita in Río Cuarto, Córdoba.

== Theologian and educator ==
In the late 1990s, Fernández followed the recommendation of the Archbishop of Buenos Aires Jorge Bergoglio and declined an invitation to head a theological institute in Bogotá.

He headed the Faculty of Theology at the Pontifical Catholic University of Argentina (CUA) when Cardinal Bergoglio nominated him to serve as its rector on 15 December 2009. He took his oath of office on 20 May 2011, when his designation received confirmation from the Congregation for Catholic Education, which had withheld its assent while Fernandez responded to objections to his appointment from the Congregation for the Doctrine of the Faith (CDF). Bergoglio resented this questioning of his judgment and Fernández found the process itself disrespectful when he traveled to Rome only to have the CDF cancel a meeting at the last minute. In July 2023, after his nomination as prefect, he stated the CDF "even investigated me"; he added that over the span of months he "clarified [his] true thinking [to the CDF] and everything was resolved serenely". Cardinal Gerhard Müller, who headed the CDF from 2012 to 2017, confirmed that the CDF had maintained a file on Fernández in the late 2000s due to concerns about his theology.

Two months after Cardinal Bergoglio became Pope Francis, he named Fernández titular archbishop of Tiburnia on 13 May 2013, and he received his episcopal consecration on 15 June 2013 in the Metropolitan Cathedral of Buenos Aires from the Archbishop of Buenos Aires, Mario Poli, with the Archbishop of Santa Fe José María Arancedo, the bishop of Río Cuarto, Eduardo Martín, the bishop of Quilmes, Carlos Tissera, and the Archbishop of Corrientes, Andrés Stanovnik, as consecrators. Fernández wore a pectoral cross Francis sent him from Rome. He was the first rector of the University to be made an archbishop. As Francis' first Argentine episcopal appointment, it was seen as a rebuke to the Roman Curia with which Francis as Archbishop of Buenos Aires had an occasionally antagonistic relationship, especially with the attempt of some in Rome to block Fernández' appointment as rector of UCA in 2011.

Pope Francis named him to the commission that drafted the concluding message (relatio) of the Extraordinary Synod of Bishops on the Family, held in October 2014.

Francis named him a member of the Fourteenth Ordinary General Assembly of the Synod of Bishops in October 2015 and appointed him to the drafting committee for the final report to be submitted to the synod participants for their votes.

On 17 December 2016, he was named a consultor to the Congregation for Catholic Education.

He ended his tenure as rector of the CUA on 25 April 2018, after completing the maximum two terms in that post.

== Archbishop of La Plata ==
Following the election of Pope Francis, Fernandez was often mentioned as a candidate for an important post in the Roman Curia, such as head of the Congregation for Catholic Education or, more distantly, prefect of the Congregation for the Doctrine of the Faith. Pope Francis named him Archbishop of La Plata on 2 June 2018 to succeed Héctor Rubén Aguer, who had been in poor health for several years, had submitted his resignation as required on his 75th birthday just a week earlier, and was long identified as an opponent of Bergoglio within the Argentine Episcopal Conference. Fernández said his program for the archdiocese would be "Evangelium gaudium, but seriously, not as a slogan", and that Francis has told him to look carefully at the archdiocesan seminary. He was enthroned in his archdiocese on the following 16 June.

As archbishop in 2019, he was accused of supporting a La Plata priest Father Eduardo Lorenzo in the face of five sex abuse allegations. Fernandez was accused of supporting Lorenzo even after an arrest warrant was issued and the priest committed suicide.

== Dicastery for the Doctrine of the Faith ==
On 1 July 2023, Pope Francis appointed him to succeed Cardinal Luis Ladaria Ferrer as prefect of the Dicastery for the Doctrine of the Faith (DDF) in mid-September. He became the first Argentine named by Pope Francis to a senior position in the Roman Curia.

A "highly unusual" letter written in Spanish from Pope Francis to Fernández was published alongside the announcement of his appointment. It defined his mission, saying: "The dicastery over which you will preside in other times came to use immoral methods. Those were times when, rather than promoting theological knowledge, possible doctrinal errors were pursued. What I expect from you is certainly something very different". The letter told Fernández to encourage theology aimed at "increasing intelligence and the transmission of the faith at the service of evangelization", noting that his life's work showed he knew how to "put theological knowledge in dialogue with the life of the holy People of God". It directed his attention here rather than to the DDF's new responsibility for clerical discipline and cases of sexual abuse.

In a letter to the faithful of his archdiocese, Fernández said he initially declined the appointment because he did not feel "qualified or trained" to lead the dicastery's section responsible for child abuse, and relented when assured that the specialists in that section were capable of working independently.

In an interview after his appointment, Fernandez said he opposed same-sex blessings but stated that those that did not create confusion should be affirmed.

On 9 July 2023, Pope Francis announced plans to make him a cardinal at a consistory scheduled for 30 September. At that consistory he was created Cardinal-Deacon of Santi Urbano e Lorenzo a Prima Porta. He participated as a cardinal elector in the 2025 papal conclave that elected Pope Leo XIV.

On his creation as a cardinal, the Survivors Network of those Abused by Priests (SNAP) and Ending Clergy Abuse (ECA) groups issued a joint statement calling on Pope Francis to remove Fernández as head of the DDF and to rescind his elevation as a cardinal. In their statement, SNAP and ECA said that in their view, by tapping Fernández to lead the DDF, “Pope Francis demonstrates not only poor judgment, but also gross disrespect to Catholic victims around the world.”

On 18 December 2023, Pope Francis approved a DDF ruling allowing priests to bless unmarried and same-sex couples. The Declaration Fiducia supplicans allowed the blessing of same-sex couples but without any type of ritualization or offering the impression of a marriage. This document sparked worldwide opposition, especially from Africa, with at least 25 episcopal conferences, 46 cardinals and bishops, and various organizations criticizing or voicing concerns about the document, including Cardinals Müller, Sarah, Napier, Kutwa and Sturla.

On 8 April 2024, Pope Francis approved the declaration Dignitas Infinita, which condemned violations of human dignity, including gender theory, as well as abortion and discrimination against women.

== Relationship with Pope Francis ==
His relationship with Pope Francis dates to his work for the Argentine Bishops' Conference, where he demonstrated his ability to incorporate different viewpoints in drafting group statements. As head of the drafting committee for the Aparecida Conference of CELAM in 2007, Francis relied on Fernandez' skill. The resistance on the part of the Roman Curia to Francis' selection of Fernández as rector of UCA is thought to have solidified Francis' support and prompted his naming Fernández an archbishop and giving him important assignments as well.

Trusted by Pope Francis, he is commonly recognized as a contributor to the exhortation Evangelii gaudium. He wrote or "contributed in significant ways" to the encyclical Laudato Si'.

Called Francis' "trusted theologian", he is said to have been the principal author of Amoris Laetitia, the apostolic exhortation issued by Francis in 2016 following the two sessions of the Synod of Bishops on the Family. In his own extended defense of Amoris, Fernandez argued for greater latitude when deciding giving Communion to the divorced and remarried. He wrote that "one cannot maintain those [sexual] acts in each and every case are gravely dishonest in a subjective sense. In the complexity of particular situations is where, according to St. Thomas Aquinas, 'the indetermination increases'". He has also said that "in many issues I am far more progressive than the Pope".

He has also been called Francis' "primary ghostwriter", as well as his close collaborator. Francis cited his essay "The Good Things of Living in This Time" in a talk to the clergy of Rome in February 2018.

== Works ==
Fernandez's book Heal Me With Your Mouth: The Art of Kissing was published in 1995; it contains a theological analysis on the art of kissing. The book resurfaced in 2023 following Fernandez's appointment to the DDF; he defended it, denying that it contained heresy or heterodox teachings, but stated that he would not write it today and that its republishing had already been discontinued.

In 1998 published in Mexico the book Mystical Passion: Spirituality and Sensuality that includes graphic descriptions of human sexual relations and discussion of what the Argentinian theologian describes as "mystical orgasm". It depicts in detail an imaginary erotic encounter with Jesus Christ on the shores of Galilee. The book's final section focuses on the human orgasm and its connection to divine intimacy. Fernández's description of "an experience of love, a passionate encounter with Jesus, that a sixteen-year-old-teenager [girl] told me about", is in the book's sixth chapter. Fernandez later described the work as "a book of my youth that I certainly would not write now" and that "could be misinterpreted"; he argued that he dismissed it soon after his publishing and ordered it not to be re-printed and later wrote "more serious works" on mysticism. Some clerical sex abuse survivors described themselves as "deeply troubled" by Fernandez's works, while the John Paul II Academy for Human Life and Family urged Pope Francis to dismiss Fernandez from his post.

In Il progetto di Francesco. Dove vuole portare la Chiesa (The Francis Project: Where He Wants to Take the Church), a book-length interview Fernandez gave to the journalist Paolo Rodari from the Italian daily La Repubblica, he describes the broad themes of Francis' papacy, the need to view moral issues in context rather than assert them as non-negotiable, to "set hearts on fire" rather than reiterate dated "philosophical or natural law-related" arguments. He said: "For example, it is no good opposing same-sex marriage because people tend to see us as a group of resentful, cruel, insensitive, over-the-top even, individuals. It is an entirely different thing to talk about the beauty of marriage and the harmony of differences that form part of an alliance between a man and woman. This positive context speaks for itself when it comes to showing that the use of the same term 'marriage' to describe same-sex unions, is unsuitable."

== See also ==
- Cardinals created by Francis
