= Héctor Aguer =

Argentine Catholic bishop (1943–2026)

- Archbishop Emeritus of La Plata
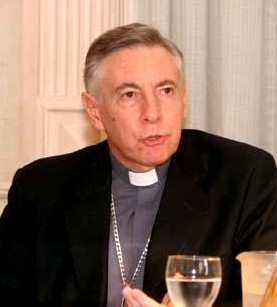
- Church: Catholic Church
- Archdiocese: La Plata
- Installed: 12 June 2000
- Term ended: 2 June 2018
- Predecessor: Carlos Walter Galán Barry
- Successor: Víctor Manuel Fernández
- Previous posts: Auxiliary Bishop of Buenos Aires and Titular Bishop of Lamdia (1992–1998); Coadjutor Archbishop of La Plata (1998–2000)

Orders
- Ordination: 25 November 1972 by Juan Carlos Aramburu
- Consecration: 4 April 1992 by Antonio Quarracino, Horacio Alberto Bózzoli and José Manuel Lorenzo

Personal details
- Born: 24 May 1943 Buenos Aires, Argentina
- Died: 10 November 2026 (aged 83)
- Coat of arms: Héctor Aguer's coat of arms

Héctor Rubén Aguer (24 May 1943 – 10 November 2026) was an Argentine Roman Catholic bishop who served as Arcbishop of La Plata in the province of Buenos Aires.

== Early life and ordination ==
Héctor Rubén Aguer was born in Buenos Aires, Argentina, on 24 May 1943. He was a member of the parish of Saint Mary Theresa Goretti; he received the degree of S.T.L. He was ordained a priest by Cardinal Juan Carlos Aramburu in Buenos Aires on 25 November 1972. After work in the parish of Saint Pedro Gonzalez Telmo, he was appointed rector of the Major Seminary of San Miguel (province of Buenos Aires).

== Bishop ==
Aguer was appointed auxiliary bishop of the Archdiocese of Buenos Aires on 26 February 1992. He was consecrated by Cardinal Antonio Quarracino on 4 April 1992. On 26 June 1998, he was appointed Archbishop Coadjutor of La Plata. He took possession of the post on 8 September 1998. He became the seventh Archbishop of La Plata on 12 June 2000.

Pope Benedict XVI named him a member of the Pontifical Council for Justice and Peace on 24 February 2007, of the Pontifical Council for Culture on 17 January 2009, and of the Pontifical Commission for Latin America on 8 October 2009. Aguer also received a papal appointment to the 2012 Synod of Bishops on the New Evangelization.

== Later life and death ==
Pope Francis accepted his resignation on 2 June 2018.

Aguer was a grand prior of the Argentinian lieutenancy of the Order of the Holy Sepulchre.

On 9 November 2026, Aguer gave an interview just before the visit of Pope Leo XIV to Argentina despite being in ill health. He died the following day, 10 November, aged 83.

Catholic Church titles
Preceded by Carlos Walter Galán Barry	Archbishop of La Plata; 2000–2018	Succeeded by Víctor Manuel Fernández
Preceded by —	Auxiliary Bishop of Buenos Aires; 1992–1998	Succeeded by —
Preceded by Baltazar Enrique Porras Cardozo	Titular Bishop of Lamdia; 1992–1998	Succeeded by Jean Gagnon
