= Archdiocese of La Plata in Argentina =

Latin Catholic territory in Argentina

Coordinates: 34.9227°S 57.9561°W

Archdiocese of La Plata Archidioecesis Metropolitae Platensis Arquidiócesis Metropolitana de La Plata

Catholic
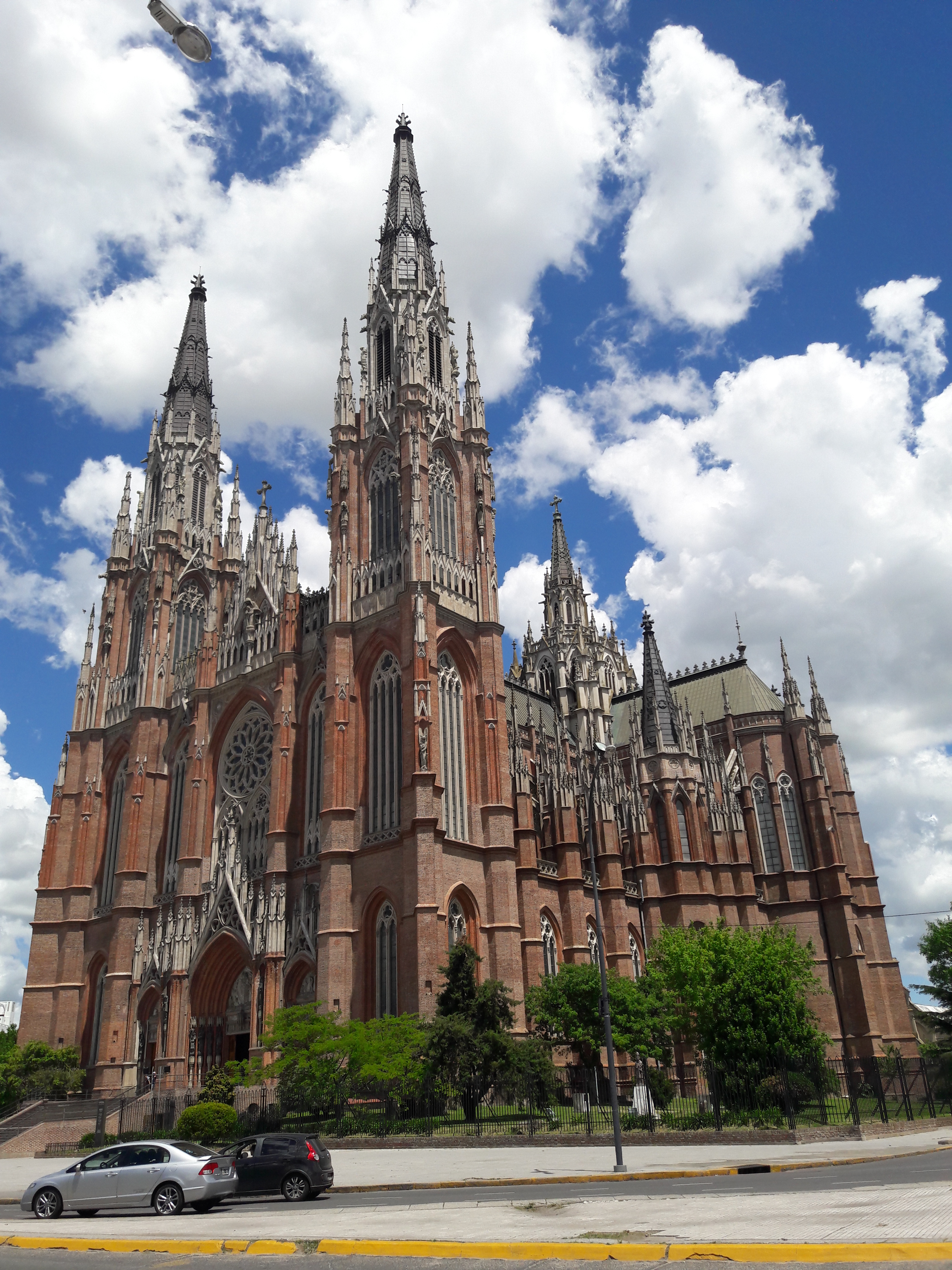
- Cathedral of the Immaculate Conception

Location
- Country: Argentina
- Ecclesiastical province: La Plata

Statistics
- Area: 4,652 km^{2} (1,796 sq mi)
- Population: Total; Catholics: (as of 2004); 750,000; 637,500 (85%)
- Parishes: 65

Information
- Denomination: Catholic Church
- Sui iuris church: Latin Church
- Rite: Roman Rite
- Established: 15 February 1897 (129 years ago)
- Cathedral: Cathedral of the Immaculate Conception
- Patron saint: Immaculate Conception; St Pontian

Current leadership
- Pope: Leo XIV
- Metropolitan Archbishop: Gustavo Oscar Carrara
- Auxiliary Bishops: Alberto Germán Bochatey Chaneton; Jorge Esteban González; Federico Wechsung
- Bishops emeritus: Gabriel Antonio Mestre

Map
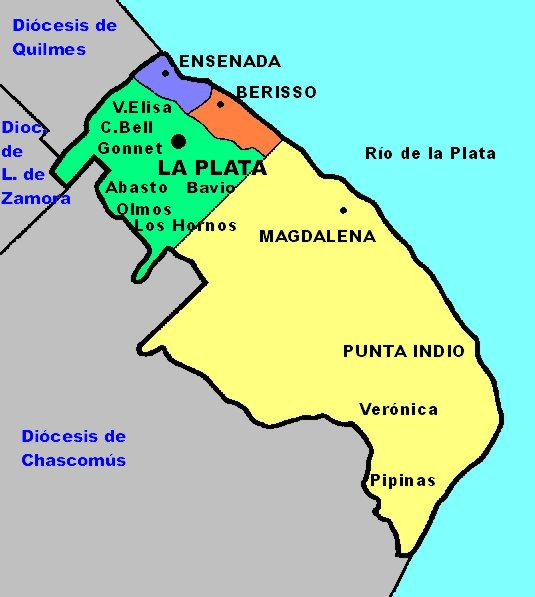

Website
- Website of the Archdiocese

The Archdiocese of La Plata is a Latin Church diocese in Argentina. It was erected on 15 February 1897, as the Diocese of La Plata and is the metropolitan see and its suffragan sees are Azul, Chascomús, and Mar del Plata. It was elevated on 20 April 1934.

== Bishops ==
=== Ordinaries ===
- Mariano Antonio Espinosa (1898–1900), appointed Archbishop of Buenos Aires
- Juan Nepomuceno Terrero y Escalada (1900–1921)
- Francisco Alberti (1921–1938)
- Juan Pascual Chimento (1938–1946)
- Tomás Juan Carlos Solari (1948–1954)
- Antonio José Plaza (1955–1985), retired
- Antonio Quarracino (1985–1990), appointed Archbishop of Buenos Aires (Cardinal in 1991)
- Carlos Walter Galán Barry (1991–2000), retired
- Héctor Rubén Aguer (2000–2018), retired
- Víctor Manuel Fernández (2018 – 2023), appointed Prefect of Dicastery for the Doctrine of the Faith
- Gabriel Antonio Mestre (2023–2024), resigned
- Gustavo Oscar Carrara (2024–Present)

=== Coadjutor archbishop ===
- Héctor Rubén Aguer (1998–2000)

=== Auxiliary bishops ===
- Francisco Alberti (1899–1917), appointed Bishop here
- Santiago Luis Copello (1918–1928), appointed Auxiliary Bishop of Buenos Aires; future Cardinal
- Juan Pascual Chimento (1928–1934), appointed Bishop of Mercedes (later returned here as Archbishop)
- Anunciado Serafini (1935–1939), appointed Bishop of Mercedes
- Germiniano Esorto (1943–1946), appointed Bishop of Bahía Blanca
- Enrique Rau (1951–1954), appointed Bishop of Resistencia
- Raúl Francisco Primatesta (1957–1961), appointed Bishop of San Rafael; future Cardinal
- Eduardo Francisco Pironio (1964–1972), appointed Bishop of Mar del Plata; future Cardinal
- Octavio Nicolás Derisi (1970–1984)
- Mario Picchi, S.D.B. (1975–1978), appointed Bishop of Venado Tuerto
- José María Montes (1978–1983), appointed Bishop of Chascomús
- Guillermo José Garlatti (1994–1997), appointed Bishop of San Rafael
- Antonio Marino (2003–2011), appointed Bishop of Mar del Plata
- Nicolás Baisi (2010–2020), appointed Bishop of Puerto Iguazú
- Alberto Germán Bochatey Chaneton, O.S.A. (2012–
- Jorge Esteban González (2020–

=== Other priests of this diocese who became bishops ===
- Miguel d’Andrea, appointed Auxiliary Bishop of Buenos Aires in 1919
- Alejandro Schell (priest here, 1922–1957), appointed Coadjutor Bishop of Lomas de Zamora in 1958

== Territorial losses ==
Year	Along with	To form
1934		Diocese of Azul; Diocese of Bahía Blanca; Diocese of Mercedes
1947		Diocese of San Nicolás de los Arroyos
1957		Diocese of Lomas de Zamora; Diocese of Morón
1957	Diocese of Bahía Blanca	Diocese of Mar del Plata
1957	Diocese of San Nicolás de los Arroyos	Diocese of San Isidro
1961	Diocese of Lomas de Zamora	Diocese of Avellaneda
1976	Diocese of Avellaneda	Diocese of Quilmes
1980	Diocese of Mar del Plata	Diocese of Chascomús

== External links and references ==
- Arzobispado de La Plata official site
- "Archdiocese of La Plata". Catholic-Hierarchy.
