= José Ángel Rovai =

Argentine Roman Catholic prelate (1936–2024)

Most Reverend José Ángel Rovai
- Bishop Emeritus of Villa María
- Church: Roman Catholic Church
- Metropolis: Córdoba
- Diocese: Villa María
- Installed: 3 October 2006
- Term ended: 28 February 2013
- Predecessor: Roberto Rodríguez
- Successor: Samuel Jofré Giraudo
- Previous post: Titular Bishop of Abaradira (1996–2006)

Orders
- Ordination: 15 August 1963 by Ramón José Castellano
- Consecration: 1 November 1999 by Carlos José Ñáñez

Personal details
- Born: José Ángel Rovai; 19 October 1936 Córdoba, Córdoba Province, Argentina
- Died: 19 June 2024 (aged 87) Córdoba, Córdoba Province, Argentina
- Denomination: Roman Catholic
- Motto: Praedicamus Christum crucifixum

Styles of José Ángel Rovai
- Reference style: His Excellency; The Most Reverend
- Spoken style: Your Excellency
- Religious style: Bishop

José Ángel Rovai (19 October 1936 – 19 June 2024) was an Argentine Roman Catholic prelate. He was auxiliary bishop of Córdoba and titular bishop of Abaradira from 1999 to 2006 and bishop of Villa María. He died in Córdoba, Argentina on 19 June 2024, at the age of 87.

Catholic Church titles
Preceded by Roberto Rodríguez	Bishop of Villa María; 2006–2013	Succeeded by Samuel Jofré Giraudo
Preceded by Fernando Torres Durán	Titular Bishop of Abaradira; 1999–2006	Succeeded by Matthias Kobena Nketsiah
