= Roman Catholic Territorial Prelature of Deán Funes =

Catholic particular church territory

Territorial Prelature of Deán Funes Praelatura Territorialis Funesiopolitanus Prelatura Territorial de Deán Funes

Catholic

Location
- Country: Argentina
- Ecclesiastical province: Córdoba
- Metropolitan: Córdoba
- Headquarters: Deán Funes, Córdoba Province, Argentina

Statistics
- Area: 28,700 km^{2} (11,100 sq mi)
- Population: Total; Catholics: (as of 2021); 68,100; 66,310 (97.4%)
- Parishes: 8

Information
- Denomination: Catholic Church
- Sui iuris church: Latin Church
- Rite: Roman Rite
- Established: 25 January 1980; 46 years ago
- Cathedral: Cathedral of Our Lady of Mount Carmel in Deán Funes, Córdoba
- Patron saint: St Francis Solanus; Virgin of Mercy
- Secular priests: 9 Diocesan

Current leadership
- Pope: Leo XIV
- Prelate: Enrique Eguía Seguí
- Metropolitan Archbishop: Ángel Sixto Rossi, S.J.
- Bishops emeritus: Aurelio José Kühn Hergenreder, O.F.M.

The Roman Catholic Territorial Prelature of Deán Funes (Latin: Praelatura Territorialis Funesiopolitanus) is in Argentina and is a suffragan see of the Archdiocese of Córdoba.

== History ==
On 25 January 1980, Blessed John Paul II established the Territorial Prelature of Deán Funes from the Diocese of Cruz del Eje.

== Leadership ==
=== Prelates of Deán Funes ===
- Ramón Iribarne Arámburu, O. de M. (25 January 1980 – 2 July 1980)
- Lucas Luis Dónnelly, O. de M. (30 December 1980 – 18 January 2000), retired
- Aurelio José Kühn Hergenreder, O.F.M. (18 January 2000 – 21 December 2013), retired
- Gustavo Gabriel Zurbriggen (21 December 2013 – 21 June 2023), appointed Bishop of Concordia
- Enrique Eguía Seguí (28 October 2023 – Present)

=== Coadjutor ===
- Gustavo Gabriel Zurbriggen (2011-2013), succeeded
