= Mamerto Esquiú =

Argentine Roman Catholic professed member

Blessed Bishop Mamerto Esquiú OFM
- Bishop of Córdoba
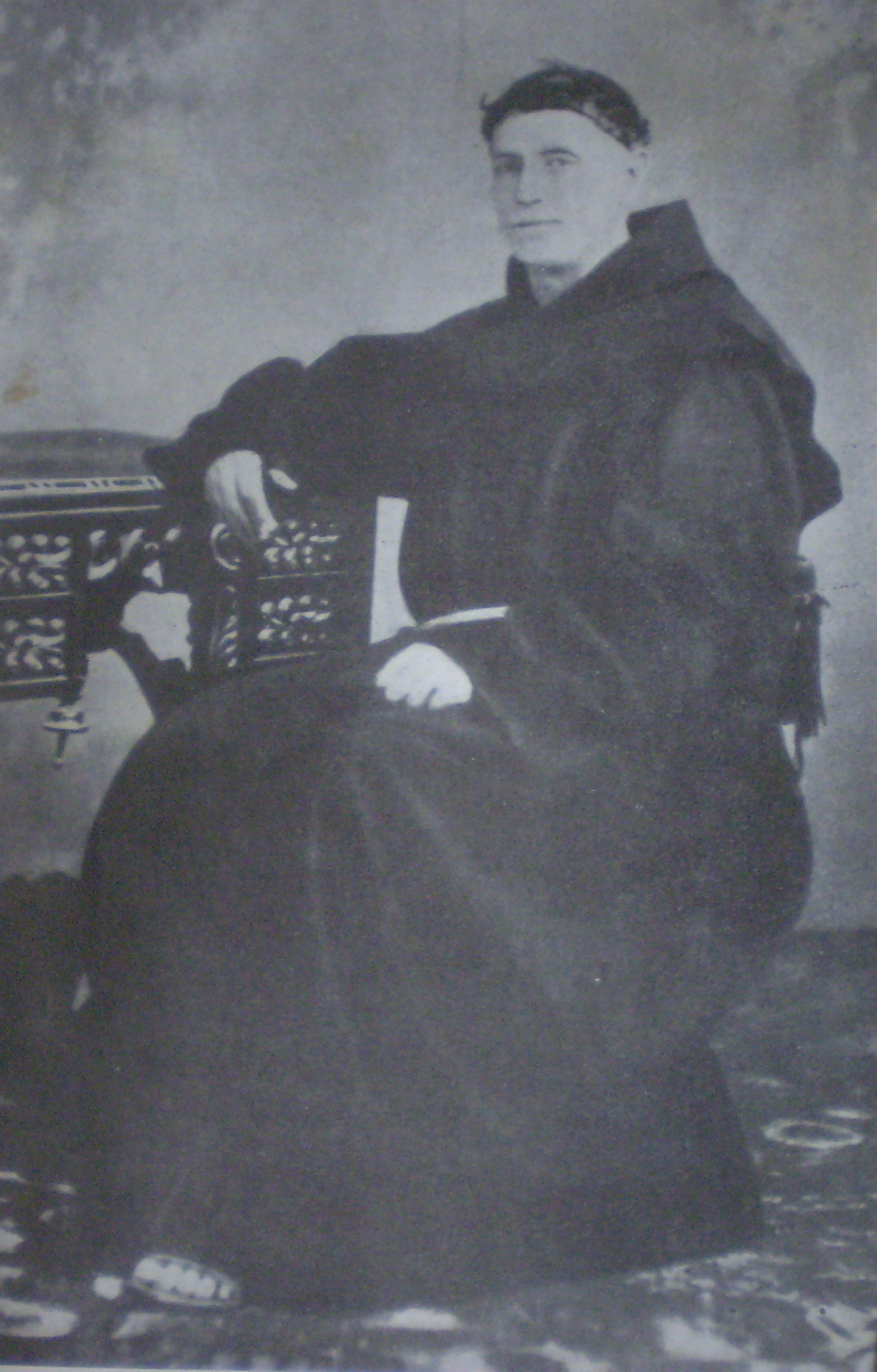
- Church: Roman Catholic Church
- Diocese: Córdoba
- See: Córdoba
- Appointed: 27 February 1880
- Installed: 17 January 1881
- Term ended: 10 January 1883
- Predecessor: Eduardo Manuel Alvarez
- Successor: Juan José Blas Tissera

Orders
- Ordination: 18 October 1848
- Consecration: 12 December 1880 by Federico León Aneiros

Personal details
- Born: Mamerto Esquiú Medina; 11 May 1826 Piedra Blanca, Catamarca, Argentina
- Died: 10 January 1883 (aged 56) El Suncho, Córdoba, Argentina

Sainthood
- Feast day: 11 May
- Venerated in: Roman Catholic Church
- Beatified: 4 September 2021; Templo de San José, Piedra Blanca, Catamarca, Argentina by Cardinal Luis Héctor Villalba

Mamerto Esquiú Medina (11 May 1826 – 10 January 1883) - born Mamerto de la Ascensión Esquiú - was an Argentine Roman Catholic professed member from the Order of Friars Minor and the Bishop of Córdoba from 1880 until his death.

Esquiú's cause for sainthood commenced under Pope Paul VI on 13 April 1978 and he became titled as a Servant of God while the confirmation of his heroic virtue allowed for Pope Benedict XVI to name him as Venerable on 16 December 2006. He was beatified on 4 September 2021.

== Life ==
Mamerto de la Ascensión Esquiú was born on 11 May 1826 in Piedra Blanca to Santiago Esquiú and María de las Nieves Medina. His mother chose the name "Mamerto de la Ascensión" in homenage to Saint Mamerto due to his date of birth being the commemoration date for Saint Mamertus while "Ascensión" comprised part of the name because the because Ascension feast fell on his birth.

Esquiú's faith came from his mother and he decided to pursue a path to the priesthood; his mother was a devotee of Francis of Assisi and from age five he himself began to cultivate a devotion and admiration for the Italian saint. He entered the Order of Friars Minor and on 31 May 1836 began his education and his period of novitiate at the Catamarca Franciscan convent in Catamarca. On 14 July 1842 he made his solemn profession into the order and was ordained to the priesthood on 18 October 1848; he celebrated his first Mass on 15 May 1849. He was committed to education being a teacher and professor at the convent for sometime and from 1850 to 1860 taught philosophical studies at a school that Governor Manuel Navarro (1791-1852) had founded.

After the Argentine civil war - and during the celebration of the Oath of the Constitution of 9 July 1853 - he preached his famous Sermon of the Constitution where he prayed for the union of all Argentine people. He became noted as a patriot for his preaching and sermons that advocated a united Argentina in accordance with the 1853 constitution. Esquiú lauded the constitution and welcomed it in the name of peace but could not finish the last sentence of his sermon because the audience burst into thunderous applause. President Justo José de Urquiza (1801-70) lauded his comments and ordered the sermon printed and distributed across Argentina.

In 1860 he settled in Paraná as the private aid to the diocese's first bishop Luis Gabriel Segura (1803-62) and remained there until the bishop's death in 1862 before moving to the Franciscan convent at Tarija in Bolivia. He was stationed there until 1867 when the Archbishop of Sucre Pedro José Puch i Solona summoned him; he remained there until 1872 and there published the newspaper dubbed "The Crusader" in response to anti-clericalism. In 1872 - while in Sucre before he left - the President endorsed him as the new Archbishop of Buenos Aires but he refused this and instead moved to Peru and then to Guayaquil in Ecuador to escape further pressure to accept the nomination. Esquiú made a trip to Rome and later to Jerusalem in 1876 and preached on the night of Good Friday to thousands of pilgrims in 1877 before returning to his hometown in late 1878.

He was appointed as the Bishop of Córdoba under Pope Leo XIII on 27 February 1880. Esquiú received his episcopal consecration on 12 December 1880 from the Cardinal Archbishop of Buenos Aires, Federico León Aneiros; he later assumed possession of his new episcopal see on 17 January 1881.

Esquiú died at 3:00pm on 10 January 1883 in El Suncho and his remains lie in the Córdoba Cathedral. Before he died he was in La Rioja but returned his diocese on 8 January 1883 weakened; he felt indigestion and was nauseous and could not eat while also being unable to sleep. There is a department in Catamarca Province that is named in his honour. The house where he was born which stands facing the church of San Antonio was declared a National Historic Monument.

=== Stolen heart ===
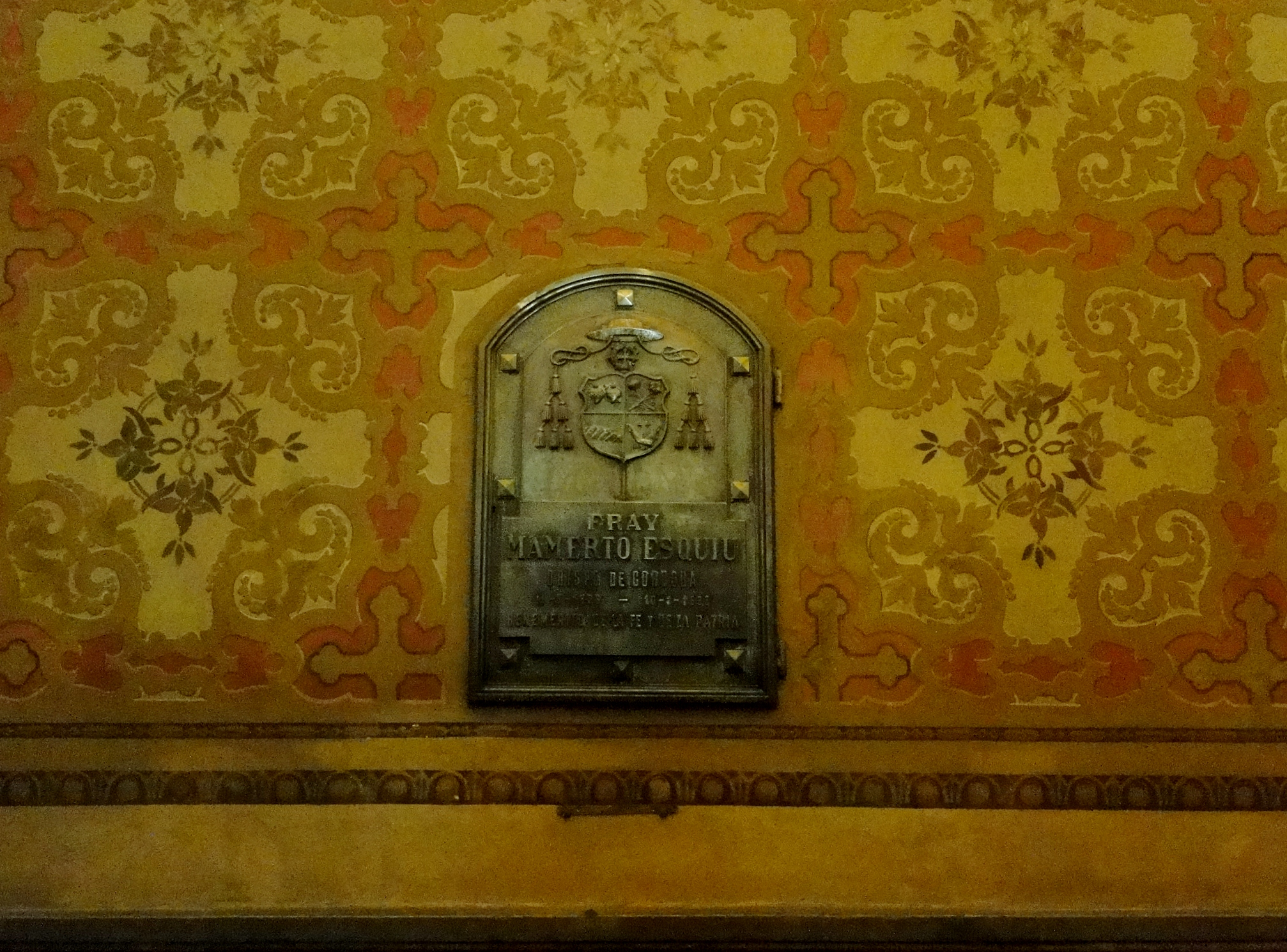
Sepulchre.

His incorrupt heart had remained in the Franciscan convent in Catamarca but on 20 January 2008 was stolen from the urn in which it was kept; this marked the second time it was taken; someone had absconded with it once on 30 October 1990 and was found the following 7 November not too far from the convent (the culprit was never identified). The urn in which the heart was kept was left behind and the head of the convent Jorge Martinez said: "The theft was carried out because of the heart - nothing else was stolen" and described the incident as "sad". Witnesses reported a bearded man running from the convent at the time of the theft. Gemain Jasani (b. 1988) was arrested a month later and said he threw it in a trash can several blocks from the convent; Jorge Martinez blamed religious fanaticism for the theft.

The heart has never been recovered.

== Beatification ==
The beatification process commenced after Bishop Fermín Emilio Lafitte inaugurated an informative process to assess the late friar's life on 18 July 1930 and later concluded the process in a solemn Mass held on 20 December 1945; theologians approved all of his spiritual writings to be in full line with official doctrine on 23 November 1963 while the Congregation for the Causes of Saints would later validate the cause on 1 March 2002.

The formal introduction to the cause came under Pope Pius XII on 4 March 1947 and he became titled as a Servant of God.

The postulation submitted the Positio dossier to the C.C.S. in 2004 who assigned a board of historians to discuss the cause on 16 November 2004. Theologians approved the cause on 3 February 2006 as did the C.C.S. on 17 October 2006 after a thorough review of the dossier's contents. Esquiú was named as Venerable on 16 December 2006 after Pope Benedict XVI confirmed that the late Franciscan had lived a model life of heroic virtue. Pope Francis approved his beatification in June 2020 and said that he was someone who showed "that faith has a transforming dynamic far superior to that of all political programs, which is the force of love". The beatification was scheduled first for 13 March 2021 but postponed due to the coronavirus pandemic; the celebration was rescheduled and celebrated on 4 September 2021 in Catamarca.

The current postulator for this cause is Giovangiuseppe Califano while the current vice-postulator is Marcelo Mendez.
