= Seguí (surname) =

The surname Seguí is a surname. Notable people with the surname include:

- Antonio Seguí (born 1934), Argentine painter and printmaker
- David Seguí (born 1966), Cuban-American former Major League Baseball infielder
- Diego Seguí (born 1937), Cuban former Major League Baseball pitcher
- Enrique Eguía Seguí (born 1962), prelate of the Roman Catholic Church
- Juan Seguí (born 1947), Spanish former sport shooter who competed in the 1976 Summer Olympics
- Luis Miguel Seguí (born 1972), Spanish actor and producer
- Salvador Seguí (1886–1923), Catalan anarcho-syndicalist
- Oliver Segui (born 1973), Filipino-Australian doctor

== See also ==
- Seguí, a village in Argentina
- Séguy
