= Diocese of San Francisco =

Diocese of San Francisco may refer to:

- Roman Catholic Archdiocese of San Francisco, U.S.
- Roman Catholic Diocese of San Francisco, Argentina
- Roman Catholic Diocese of San Francisco de Macorís, Dominican Republic
