= Juan Manuel Mercadillo =

17th and 18th-century Spanish Catholic bishop

Most Reverend Juan Manuel Mercadillo
- Bishop of Córdoba
- Church: Catholic Church
- Diocese: Diocese of Córdoba
- In office: 1695–1704
- Predecessor: Juan Bravo Dávila y Cartagena
- Successor: Manuel González y Virtus

Orders
- Consecration: November 1695

Personal details
- Born: 1643 La Puebla de Almoradiel, Spain
- Died: 17 July 1704 (age 61) Córdoba, Argentina

Juan Manuel Mercadillo y Patiño, O.P. (1643–1704) was a Roman Catholic prelate who served as Bishop of Córdoba (1695–1704).

== Biography ==
Juan Manuel Mercadillo was born in La Puebla de Almoradiel, Spain in 1643 and ordained a priest in the Order of Preachers. By 1665, he joined a Dominican missionary to the provinces of Bataan and Zambales in the Philippines. From 1678 to 1682, for two terms, he served as the Rector Magnificus of the University of Santo Tomas where he also taught theology and philosophy. On 7 August 1694, he was selected by the King of Spain as Bishop of Córdoba and confirmed by Pope Innocent XII on 8 November 1694. In November 1695, he was consecrated bishop. He served as Bishop of Córdoba until his death on 17 July 1704.

Catholic Church titles
Preceded by Juan Bravo Dávila y Cartagena	Bishop of Córdoba; 1695–1704	Succeeded by Manuel González y Virtus
Academic offices
Preceded by Juan de Paz	Rector Magnificus of the University of Santo Tomas; 1678–1680, 1680–1682	Succeeded by Juan de Santa Maria
