= Diocese of Villa María =

Catholic ecclesiastical territory

Diocese of Villa María Dioecesis Civitatis Mariae Diócesis de Villa María

Catholic
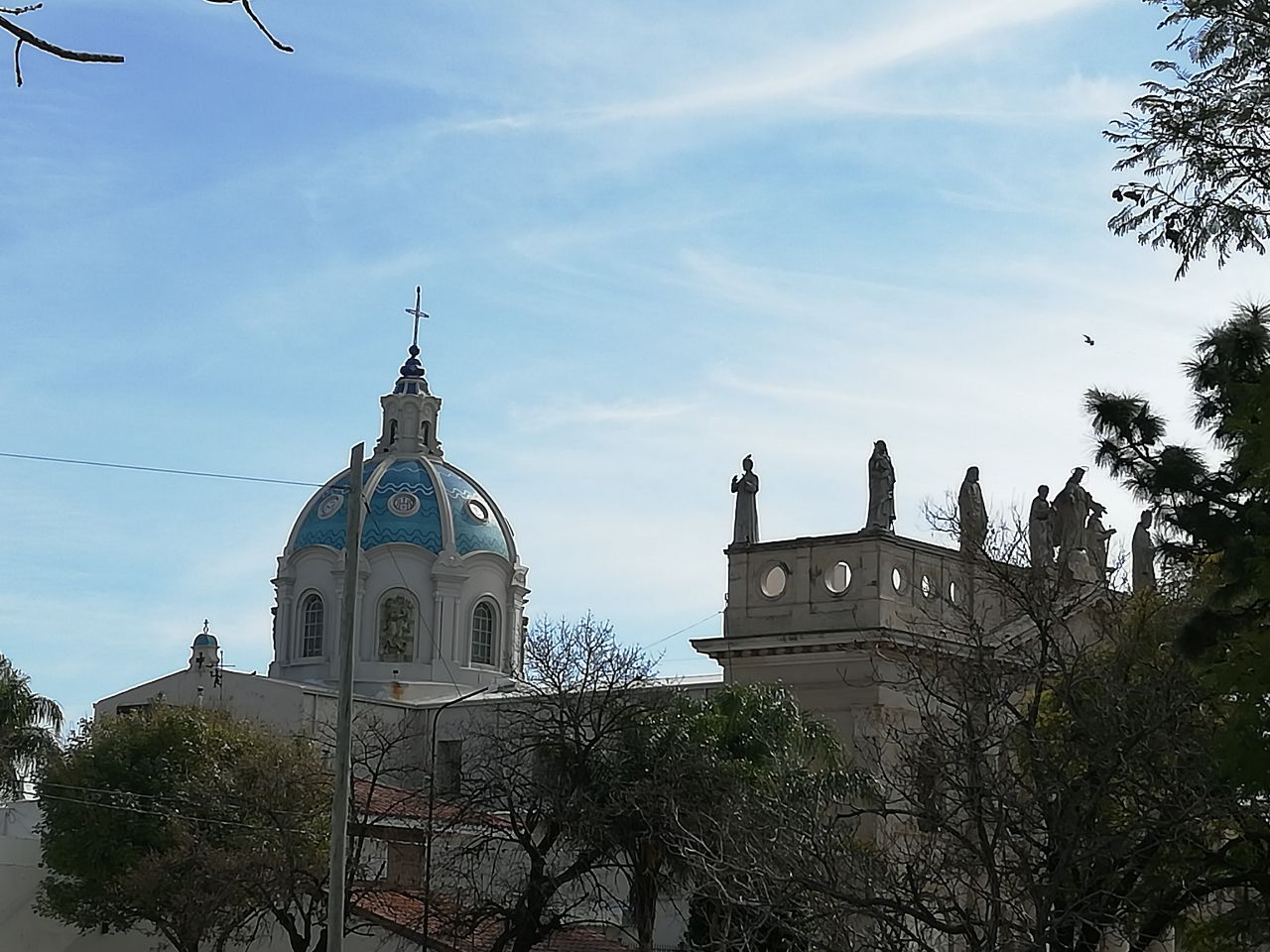
- Cathedral of the Immaculate Conception

Location
- Country: Argentina
- Ecclesiastical province: Córdoba
- Metropolitan: Córdoba

Statistics
- Area: 28,000 km^{2} (11,000 sq mi)
- Population: Total; Catholics: (as of 2010); 382,000; 305,000 (79.8%)
- Parishes: 50

Information
- Denomination: Roman Catholic
- Rite: Roman Rite
- Established: 11 February 1957 (69 years ago)
- Cathedral: Cathedral of the Immaculate Conception in Villa María
- Patron saint: Immaculate Conception

Current leadership
- Pope: Leo XIV
- Bishop: Samuel Jofré Giraudo
- Metropolitan Archbishop: Carlos José Ñáñez
- Bishops emeritus: José Ángel Rovai

Website
- Website of the Diocese

The Roman Catholic Diocese of Villa María (Latin: Dioecesis Civitatis Mariae) is a Catholic diocese located in the city of Villa María in the ecclesiastical province of Córdoba in Argentina.

== History ==
On 11 February 1957, Pope Pius XII established the Diocese of Villa María from the Archdiocese of Córdoba.

== Bishops ==
=== Ordinaries ===
- Alberto Deane C.P. (1957–1977)
- Cándido Genaro Rubiolo (1977–1979), appointed Archbishop of Mendoza
- Alfredo Guillermo Disandro (1980–1998)
- Roberto Rodríguez (1998–2006), appointed Bishop of La Rioja
- José Ángel Rovai (2006–2013)
- Samuel Jofré Giraudo (2013– )

=== Another priest of this diocese who became bishop ===
- Damián Santiago Bitar, appointed Auxiliary Bishop of San Justo in 2008
