= Cathedral of Córdoba =

Cathedral of Córdoba may refer to:

- Cathedral of Córdoba (Argentina), a Roman Catholic cathedral in Argentina
- Mosque–Cathedral of Córdoba, a Roman Catholic cathedral in Spain
