= Roberto Rodríguez (bishop) =

Argentine Roman Catholic bishop (1936–2021)

- Bishop of La Rioja
- Church: Catholic Church
- Diocese: Diocese of La Rioja
- In office: 24 May 2006 – 9 July 2013
- Predecessor: Fabriciano Sigampa
- Successor: Marcelo Daniel Colombo
- Previous posts: Bishop of Villa María (1998-2006); Titular Bishop of Pertusa (1992-1998); Auxiliary Bishop of Córdoba (1992-1998)

Orders
- Ordination: 31 January 1970 by Raúl Francisco Primatesta
- Consecration: 22 December 1992 by Raúl Francisco Primatesta

Personal details
- Born: 14 August 1936 Temperley, Buenos Aires Province, Argentina
- Died: 3 July 2021 (aged 84) Jesús María, Córdoba Province, Argentina

Roberto Rodríguez (14 August 1936 – 3 July 2021) was an Argentine Roman Catholic prelate. He served as the titular bishop of Pertusa from 1992 to 1998 and the fourth Bishop of the Roman Catholic Diocese of Villa María in Argentina from 1998 to 2006. He was then appointed the sixth Bishop of the Roman Catholic Diocese of La Rioja by Pope John Paul II, a position he held from 2006 until his retirement on 9 July 2013.

Rodríguez was born in Temperley district, Greater Buenos Aires, on 14 August 1936. He was ordained as a Catholic priest on 31 January 1970, in the town of Cosquín, by the Archbishop of Córdoba Raúl Francisco Primatesta. He later completed a theology degree at Pontifical Gregorian University.

Roberto Rodríguez, the Bishop Emeritus of La Rioja, died from COVID-19 at a hospital in Jesús María, Córdoba Province, on 3 July 2021, at the age of 85.
