= Omar Félix Colomé =

- Bishop of Cruz del Eje
- Church: Catholic Church
- Diocese: Diocese of Cruz del Eje
- In office: 27 September 1984 – 24 June 2008
- Predecessor: Enrique Pechuán Marín
- Successor: Santiago Olivera

Orders
- Ordination: 22 September 1962
- Consecration: 28 October 1984 by Raúl Francisco Primatesta

Personal details
- Born: 11 December 1932 Arroyito, Córdoba Province, Argentina
- Died: 12 July 2015 (aged 82)

Omar Félix Colomé (December 11, 1932 – July 12, 2015) was an Argentine Roman Catholic bishop.

Ordained to the priesthood in 1962, Colomé was named bishop of the Roman Catholic Diocese of Cruz del Eje in 1984. In 2006, he formed the Society of St. John, a Society of Apostolic Life.

Colomé retired in 2008 and died in 2015.

== Notes ==
- Falleció el exobispo de Cruz del Eje Félix Colomé
- COLOMÉ, Omar Félix
- Murió Mons. Omar Colomé, emérito de Cruz del Eje
