= La Hita Astronomical Observatory =

Spanish astronomical observatory

Coordinates: 39°34′07″N 3°11′10″W

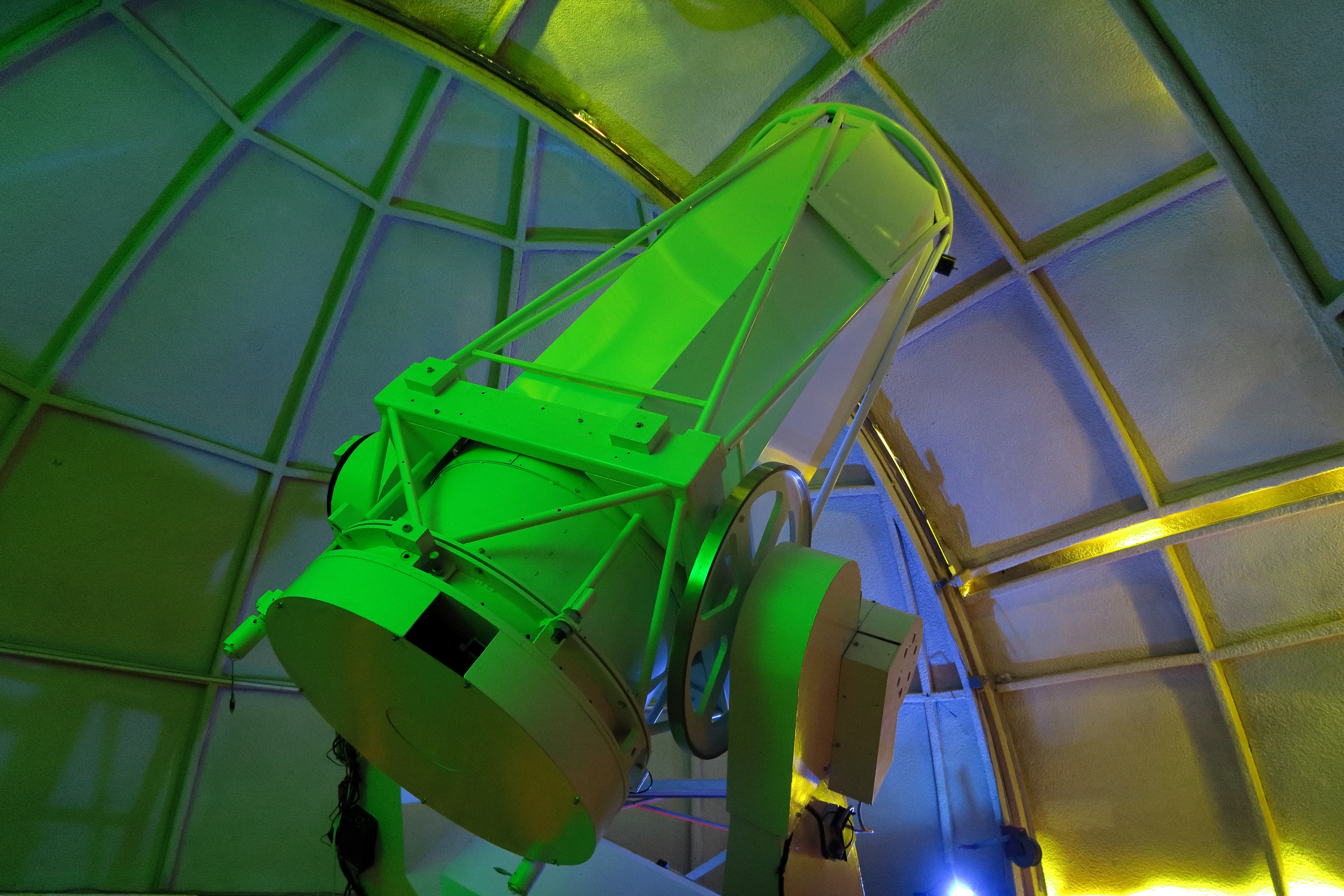
- La Hita Observatory
- Observatory code: I95
- Location: La Puebla de Almoradiel, Spain
- Related media on Commons

The Astronomical Observatory of La Hita is an astronomical observatory located 9 kilometers from the urban center of the Toledo municipality of La Puebla de Almoradiel, Spain. The observatory, founded by Faustino Organero, is part of the La Hita Astronomical Complex and is managed by the AstroHita Foundation, which carries out research and dissemination work.

== Research ==
The telescopes are dedicated to three investigations:

- The study of dwarf planets, together with the Institute of Astrophysics of Andalusia.
- Detection of asteroids, together with the University of Huelva.
- Detection of impacts on the Moon, within the MIDAS Project (Moon Impacts Detection and Analysis System) that is developed jointly by the University of Huelva and the Institute of Astrophysics of Andalusia.

The 'Smart' project, which forms part of the MIDAS project, has the objective of constantly monitoring the sky to record the impact of asteroids against the Earth. The Observatory has two telescopes, the TEDI and the PHOENIX. Both are integrated into the MIDAS project that has managed to record important phenomena.

== Education ==
Activities are organized for the general public and the educational community, both nocturnal and diurnal (such as the observation of the Sun) accessible to different teaching and educational centers.
