= Carlos Ciríaco Massa =

Argentine architect

Carlos Ciríaco Massa (born 14 March 1897– 1980 in Buenos Aires, Argentina) was an Argentine architect and teacher, considered one of the most prolific designers of religious architecture in the country. He graduated from the Faculty of Architecture of the University of Buenos Aires in 1922 with a thesis on the restoration of Romanesque monuments. Under the leadership of Cardinal Santiago Copello, Massa developed a systematic plan to expand the Catholic presence in the suburbs, building 36 churches between 1944 and 1952.

== Modular church system ==
Massa implemented a design method known as cloned churches, based on a modular system inspired by Lombard Romanesque architecture. This system allowed churches to be adapted to the budget and terrain using five basic elements: bell tower, nave, chancel, side chapels, and apse. According to studies, this methodology reduced costs by 40% and allowed works to be completed within six months.

== Styles ==
According to Juan Antonio Lázara, Massa's work can be grouped into seven main styles:

- Lombard-Catalan Neo-Romanesque, characterised by exposed brickwork and square towers, as seen in Santa María (Caballito, 1934) and Santa Amelia (Almagro, 1936);
- Late urban Neo-Romanesque, with a grey stone-like finish and Gothic rose windows, for example San Bartolomé Apóstol (1932) and Cristo Rey (1931);
- Economical Neo-Romanesque, decorated by smooth walls with simple arches, for instance San Francisco Solano (1928) and Nuestra Señora de las Nieves (1940);
- Calchaquí Neo-Romanesque style, syncretism between Romanesque and colonial architecture of northern Argentina, with a sheltering arch on the façade, as in San Pablo Apóstol (1928) and Sagrado Corazón de Jesús (Villa Sarsfield, 1945);
- Neocolonial, a revival of Hispanic tradition with tile-covered towers, as seen in San Isidro Labrador (1931) and Santa Adela (1940).

Massa additionally created churches with a single central bell tower and a symmetrical structure, such as in Santa Clara (1930) and Santa Elisa (1938). He also produced atypical architectural designs for large-scale works, namely Basilica of Our Lady of the Miraculous Medal (1934) and Basilica of Saint Nicholas of Bari (1935).

== Notable works ==
Designed by Massa, the Basilica of Saint Nicholas of Bari is a French academicist (Beaux-Arts) style temple located at 1352 Santa Fe Avenue. The current structure was inaugurated on 29 November 1935 to replace the original temple from 1733, which was demolished in 1931 to allow for the widening of Corrientes Avenue.

The church stands out for its monumental scale, with a symmetrical façade featuring twin bell towers and a triple staircase. Its three-nave interior houses historical relics, including the baptismal font where Mariano Moreno, Bartolomé Mitre and Manuel Dorrego were baptised.
