= Elmer Osmar Ramón Miani =

- Bishop of Catamarca
- Church: Catholic Church
- Diocese: Diocese of Catamarca
- In office: 19 December 1989 – 27 December 2007
- Predecessor: Alfonso Pedro Torres Farías
- Successor: Luis Urbanč
- Previous posts: Titular Bishop of Caeciri (1983-1989); Auxiliary Bishop of Córdoba (1983-1989)

Orders
- Ordination: 20 September 1958
- Consecration: 12 December 1983 by Raúl Francisco Primatesta

Personal details
- Born: 23 April 1933 Villa Concepción del Tío (northwest of Arroyito), Córdoba Province, Argentina
- Died: 25 May 2014 (aged 81)

Elmer Osmar Ramón Miani (22 April 1933 – 25 May 2014) was a Roman Catholic bishop.

Ordained to the priesthood in 1958, Miani was named titular bishop of Carciri and auxiliary bishop of the Roman Catholic Diocese of Córdoba, Argentina in 1983. In 1989, Miani was appointed bishop of the Roman Catholic Diocese of Catamarca and retired in 2007.
