= Santa Bernadette Soubirous =

- Church of Saint Bernadette Soubirous
- Chiesa Parrocchiale di Santa Bernadette Soubirous
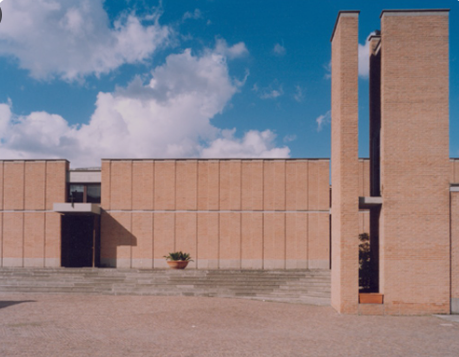

- Location within Rome
- 41°54′48″N 12°34′34″E
- Location: Via Ettore Franceschini 40, Tor Cervara, Rome
- Country: Italy
- Language: Italian
- Denomination: Catholic
- Tradition: Roman Rite
- Website: santabernadette.it

History
- Status: titular church, parish church
- Dedication: Bernadette Soubirous
- Consecrated: 4 March 1989

Architecture
- Functional status: active
- Architect: Vivina Rizzi
- Architectural type: Modern
- Years built: 1983–86

Administration
- Diocese: Rome

Santa Bernadette Soubirous is a 20th-century parochial church and titular church in eastern Rome, dedicated to Saint Bernadette Soubirous (1844–1879).

== History ==
The church was built in 1983–86, the architect being Vivina Rizzi; it is built of red brick on a square plan. Pope John Paul II visited in 1990.

On 30 September 2023, Pope Francis made it a titular church to be held by a cardinal-priest.

Cardinal-protectors

- Ángel Sixto Rossi (2023–present)
