= Séguy =

Séguy is a surname. Notable people with the surname include:

- Joseph Séguy (1689–1761), French clergyman
- Eugène Séguy (1890–1985), French entomologist and artist who specialised in Diptera
- Pierre Séguy (1921-2004), alias for French resistance fighter Otto Steinschneider
- Jean Séguy (1925–2007), French sociologist of religion

== See also ==
- Seguy, a surname
- Seguí (surname)
