= Diocese of Cruz del Eje =

Catholic ecclesiastical territory

Coordinates: 30.7437°S 64.7920°W

Diocese of Cruz del Eje Dioecesis Crucis Axeatae Diócesis de Cruz del Eje

Catholic
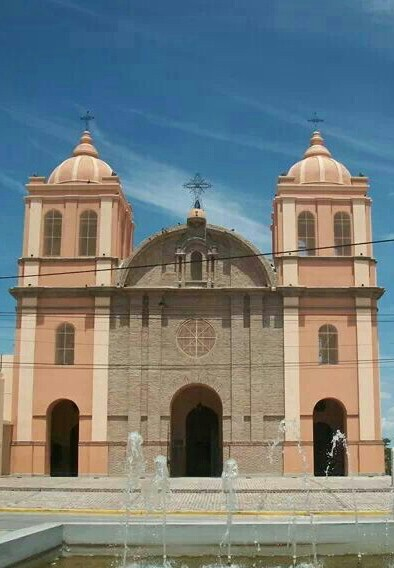
- Catedral Nuestra Sradel Carmen-CruzdelEje

Location
- Country: Argentina
- Ecclesiastical province: Córdoba
- Metropolitan: Córdoba

Statistics
- Area: 22,187 km^{2} (8,566 sq mi)
- Population: Total; Catholics: (as of 2006); 158,000; 147,000 (93%)
- Parishes: 16

Information
- Denomination: Roman Catholic
- Rite: Roman Rite
- Established: 12 August 1963 (63 years ago)
- Cathedral: Cathedral of Our Lady of the Valley in Cruz del Eje

Current leadership
- Pope: Leo XIV
- Bishop: Hugo Ricardo Araya
- Metropolitan Archbishop: Carlos José Ñáñez
- Bishops emeritus: Omar Félix Colomé

Website
- Website of the Diocese

The Roman Catholic Diocese of Cruz del Eje (Latin: Dioecesis Crucis Axeatae) is in Argentina and is a suffragan of the Archdiocese of Córdoba. Bishop Santiago Olivera left on March 28, 2017 after being appointed Ordinary of the Military in Argentina.

== History ==
On 12 August 1963, Saint John XXIII established the Diocese of Cruz del Eje from the Archdiocese of Córdoba.

== Ordinaries ==
- Enrique Pechuán Marín (1963–1983)
- Omar Félix Colomé (1984–2008)
- Santiago Olivera (2008–2017), appointed Bishop of Argentina, Military
- Hugo Ricardo Araya (2017- )

== Territorial losses ==
Year	Along with	To form
1980		Territorial Prelature of Deán Funes

== External links and references ==
- Diócesis de Cruz del Eje -- official website
- "Diocese of Cruz del Eje". Catholic-Hierarchy. ^{[self-published]}
