= El-Haraïria =

Town in Tunisia

El-Hraïria is a suburb of Tunis, Tunisia located at 36.781395, 10.115375 in an outer western suburb of Tunis, Tunisia, North Africa. El Haraitria is also the site of Roman era ruins of Ad Pertusa, a Roman Civitas that flourished between 30 BC - AD 640.

The town is on the western railway line out of Tunis.
