= Pertusa (Africa) =

Pertusa was an ancient city and diocese in Tunisia. It is now a Catholic titular bishopric.

== History ==
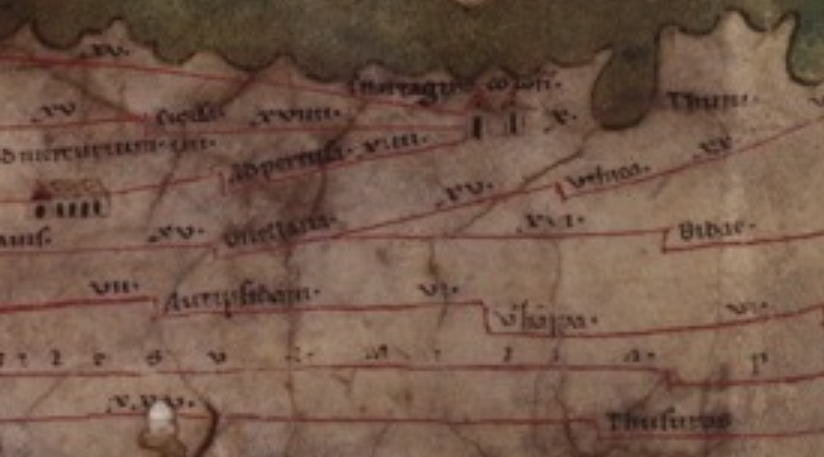
extract of the Tabula Peutingeriana showing Roman North Africa, during 4th century.

The Bishopric of Ad Pertusa was centered on the ancient Roman civitas of Pertvsa, which has been identified with ruins at modern El-Haraïria, an outer suburb of Tunis. During the Roman Empire Pertusa was located in the Roman province of Africa Proconsularis and was important enough to become a bishopric, which was suffragan to the nearby Metropolitan, of Carthage.

The town is mentioned in the Antonini Itinerarium.

== Titular see ==
It was nominally revived in 1933 as a Latin titular see of the lowest (episcopal) in 1933, and has almost constantly been awarded. Its incumbents were mostly secular priests :

- Giorgio Giuseppe Haezaert, Spiritans (C.S.Sp.) (1935.06.18 – 1957.09.29), as first Apostolic Vicar of Northern Katanga (in then Belgian Congo)
- Leonard Philip Cowley (1957.11.28 – 1973.08.18)
- George Kinzie Fitzsimons (1975.05.20 – 1984.03.28)
- Kazimierz Górny (1984.10.26 – 1992.03.25)
- Roberto Rodríguez (1992.11.12 – 1998.06.23)
- Liborius Ndumbukuti Nashenda, Missionary Oblates of Mary Immaculate (O.M.I.) (1998.11.05 – 2004.09.21), as Auxiliary Bishop of Windhoek (capital of Namibia) (1998.11.05 – 2004.09.21), next Metropolitan Archbishop of Windhoek (2004.09.21 – ...) and President of Namibian Catholic Bishop’s Conference (September 2007 – ...)
- Philippe Jean-Charles Jourdan, (2005.04.01 – ...), Apostolic Administrator of Estonia
