= Juan Bravo Dávila y Cartagena =

Most Reverend Juan Bravo Dávila y Cartagena
- Bishop of Córdoba
- Church: Catholic Church
- Diocese: Diocese of Córdoba
- In office: 1688–1690
- Predecessor: Nicolás de Ulloa y Hurtado de Mendoza
- Successor: Juan Manuel Mercadillo

Orders
- Consecration: 21 November 1688 by Manuel de Mollinedo Angulo

Personal details
- Born: 22 August 1629 Cuzco, Peru
- Died: 4 December 1690 (age 61) Córdoba, Argentina

Juan Bravo Dávila y Cartagena (1629–1690) was a Roman Catholic prelate who served as Bishop of Córdoba (1688–1690).

== Biography ==
Juan Bravo Dávila y Cartagena was born in Cuzco, Peru on 22 August 1629. On 29 August 1687, he was selected by the King of Spain as Bishop of Córdoba and confirmed by Pope Innocent XI on 24 November 1687. On 21 November 1688, he was consecrated bishop by Manuel de Mollinedo Angulo, Bishop of Cuzco. He served as Bishop of Córdoba until his death on 4 December 1690.

Catholic Church titles
Preceded by Nicolás de Ulloa y Hurtado de Mendoza	Bishop of Córdoba; 1688–1690	Succeeded by Juan Manuel Mercadillo
