= Seguy =

Seguy is a surname. Notable people with the surname include:

- Irbis Seguy (r. 642–651), ruler of the Western Turkic Khaganate (Western Turkic Empire)
- Rogelio Montemayor Seguy (born 1947), Mexican politician and economist

== See also ==
- Séguy, a French surname
