= Francisco de Vitoria (bishop) =

Most Reverend Francisco de Vitoria O.P.
- Bishop of Córdoba
- Church: Catholic Church
- Diocese: Diocese of Córdoba
- In office: 1578–1592
- Predecessor: Jerónimo de Villa Carrillo
- Successor: Fernando Trexo y Senabria

Orders
- Consecration: 18 November 1578

Personal details
- Born: 1540
- Died: 1592 (aged 51–52) Córdoba, Argentina
- Denomination: Roman Catholicism
- Education: Complutense University of Madrid

Don Fray Francisco de Vitoria, O.P. (1540 - 1592) was a Roman Catholic prelate who served as Bishop of Córdoba (1578–1592).

== Biography ==
Francisco de Vitoria attended Estudio de Escuelas Generales de Alcaláwas (Modern name Complutense University of Madrid). He was ordained as a priest in the Order of Preachers. On 13 January 1578, he was appointed during the papacy of Pope Gregory XIII as Bishop of Córdoba. On 18 November 1578, he was consecrated bishop. He served as Bishop of Córdoba until his death in 1592.

== Family ==
De Vitoria's family was of Jewish heritage and his father, Duarte Nunez, was a New Christian. He was the brother of Abraham Curiel and the paternal uncle of Jacob Curiel.

Catholic Church titles
Preceded by Jerónimo de Villa Carrillo	Bishop of Córdoba; 1578–1592	Succeeded by Fernando Trexo y Senabria
