= Lucas Luis Dónnelly =

Lucas Luis Dónnelly, O. de M.
- Prelate of Territorial Prelature of Deán Funes (emeritus)
- Church: Roman Catholic Church
- See: Territorial Prelature of Deán Funes
- In office: 1980 - 2000
- Predecessor: Ramón Iribarne Arámburu
- Successor: Aurelio José Kühn Hergenreder
- Previous post: Priest

Orders
- Ordination: December 21, 1946
- Consecration: January 6, 1981 by John Paul II

Personal details
- Born: 29 July 1921 General Cabrera, Argentina
- Died: 31 August 2012 (aged 91)

Lucas Luis Dónnelly (29 July 1921 – 31 August 2012) was an Argentine Prelate of Roman Catholic Church.

Dónnelly was born in General Cabrera, Argentina and was ordained a priest on December 21, 1946. He was a member of the religious order Our Lady of Mercy. Dónnelly was appointed Bishop of the Prelature of Deán Funes December 30, 1980 and ordained January 6, 1981. Dónnelly was installed Prelate of Deán Funes on March 14, 1981 and would serve for nearly twenty years until retirement on January 18, 2000

== See also ==
- Territorial Prelature of Deán Funes
