= Roman Catholic Diocese of San Francisco =

Catholic ecclesiastical territory

Diocese of San Francisco Dioecesis Franciscopolitanus Diócesis de San Francisco

Catholic

Location
- Country: Argentina
- Ecclesiastical province: Córdoba
- Metropolitan: Córdoba

Statistics
- Area: 19,611 km^{2} (7,572 sq mi)
- Population: Total; Catholics: (as of 2010); 218,000; 213,000 (97.7%)
- Parishes: 30

Information
- Denomination: Roman Catholic
- Rite: Roman Rite
- Established: 10 April 1961 (65 years ago)
- Cathedral: Cathedral St Francis of Assisi in San Francisco, Córdoba

Current leadership
- Pope: Leo XIV
- Bishop: Sergio Osvaldo Buenanueva
- Metropolitan Archbishop: Carlos José Ñáñez

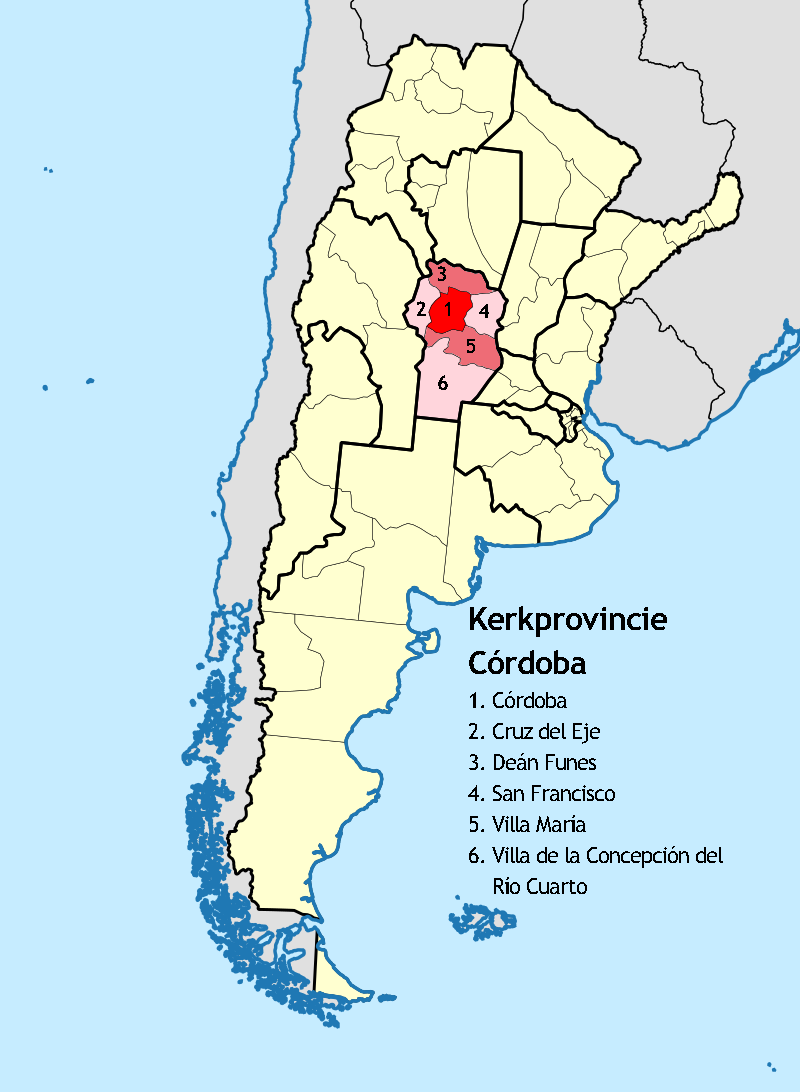
Dioceses of Argentina (San Francisco marked number 4)

For the Archdiocese in California, USA, please see Roman Catholic Archdiocese of San Francisco

The Roman Catholic Diocese of San Francisco (Latin: Dioecesis Franciscopolitanus) is in Argentina and is a suffragan of the Archdiocese of Córdoba.

== History ==
On 10 April 1961, Blessed John XXIII established the Diocese of San Francisco from the Archdiocese of Córdoba.

== Ordinaries ==
- Pedro Reginaldo Lira † (1961–1965)
- Agustín Adolfo Herrera † (1965–1988)
- Baldomero Carlos Martini (1988–2004) Appointed Bishop of San Justo
- Carlos José Tissera (2004–2011) Appointed Bishop of Quilmes
- Sergio Osvaldo Buenanueva (2013–present)
