= Abaradira =

Roman Catholic titular see

Roman North Africa

Abaradira was a city in the Roman province of Byzacena. Its exact location is unknown, but it would have been in the central part of what is today Tunisia in North Africa.

After the fall of the Roman Empire, Abaradira was the seat of a Christian bishopric. The historical records show only one bishop of Abaradira, a cleric named Praefectianus. He was summoned by Huneric, ruler of the Vandal Kingdom in North Africa, to the Conference of Carthage in 484 CE. After the meeting, Huneric exiled Praefectianus and other bishops due to a major theological dispute.

Abaradira survives as titular bishopric in the Roman Catholic Church. As of 2025, the title is held by Marko Semren, the auxiliary bishop of Banja Luka in Bosnia and Herzegovina.

== See also ==
· · ·
