= Ramón José Castellano =

Argentinian archbishop (1903–1979)

The Most Reverend Ramón José Castellano
- Archbishop of Córdoba
- Archdiocese: Córdoba
- See: Córdoba
- Appointed: 26 March 1958
- Term ended: 19 January 1965
- Predecessor: Fermín Emilio Lafitte
- Successor: Raúl Francisco Primatesta
- Previous posts: Auxiliary Bishop of Córdoba (1945–1958); Titular Bishop of Flavias (1945–1958); Titular Archbishop of Iomnium (1965–1970)

Orders
- Ordination: 18 September 1926
- Consecration: 28 April 1946 by Fermín Emilio Lafitte

Personal details
- Born: 15 February 1903 Villa Dolores, Córdoba, Argentina
- Died: 27 January 1979 (aged 75) Córdoba, Argentina
- Buried: Cathedral of Nuestra Señora de la Asunción, Córdoba, Argentina
- Denomination: Roman Catholic

Ordination history of Ramón José Castellano
History
Priestly ordination
- Ordained by: Juan Carlos Aramburu
Episcopal consecration
- Principal consecrator: Fermín Emilio Lafitte
- Co-consecrators: Froilán Ferreira Reinafé, Alfonso María Buteler
Episcopal succession
Bishops consecrated by Ramón José Castellano as principal consecrator
- Horacio Arturo Gómez Dávila: 31 August 1958
- Enrique A. Angelelli Carletti: 12 March 1961

Ramón José Castellano (15 February 1903 – 27 January 1979) was the Argentine Archbishop of Córdoba, known to have ordained to the Catholic priesthood Jorge Mario Bergoglio, S.J., who later became Pope Francis.

Castellano was born in the community of Villa Dolores in the Province of Cordoba. On 18 September 1926 he was ordained as a priest, at the age of 23, for the then-Diocese of Córdoba, predecessor to the archdiocese. At the age of 42 he was appointed to be both the auxiliary bishop of Córdoba and the titular bishop of Flavias, for which he was consecrated as a bishop on 28 April 1945 by the then-Archbishop of Córdoba, Fermín Emilio Lafitte.

On 26 March 1958 Castellano was promoted to be Archbishop of Córdoba. He held this post until his resignation on 19 January 1965. He was then named as the Titular Archbishop of Iomnium, but resigned from this office on 20 December 1970, at the age of 67.

Castellano held the title of Archbishop Emeritus of Córdoba until his death at the age of 75. His remains were buried in the cathedral of the archdiocese.
