= Cathedral of Córdoba, Argentina =

Church in Argentina

Coordinates: 31°25′00″S 64°11′05″W

Our Lady of the Assumption Cathedral
- Catedral de Córdoba
- Catedral de Nuestra Señora de la Asunción
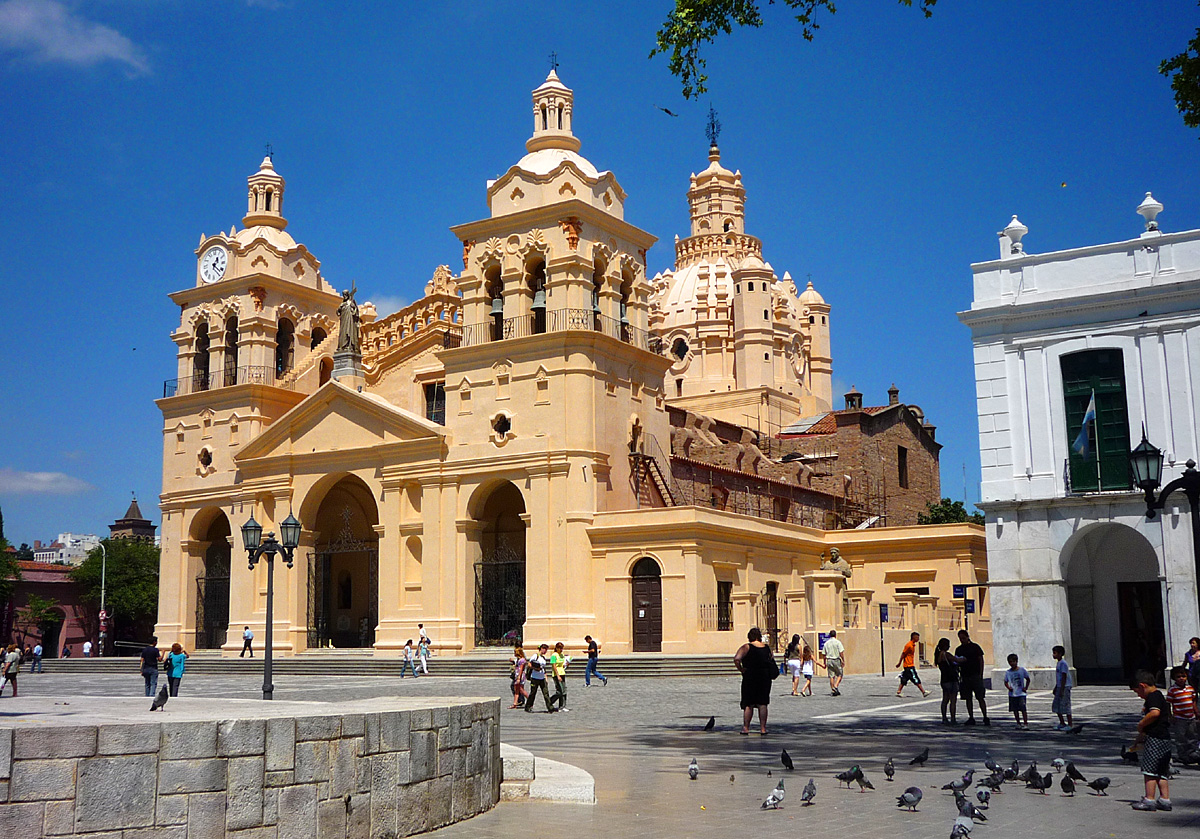
- The Cathedral in 2010
- Our Lady of the Assumption Cathedral
- Location: Córdoba
- Address: Independencia 80
- Country: Argentina
- Website: catedraldecordoba.org.ar

History
- Founded: 1582; 444 years ago

Administration
- Archdiocese: Córdoba, Argentina

National Historic Monument of Argentina
- Designated: 1941

The Cathedral of Córdoba (officially Our Lady of the Assumption Cathedral, Spanish: Catedral de Nuestra Señora de la Asunción) is the colonial cathedral church of the Roman Catholic Archdiocese of Córdoba, in Córdoba, Argentina, and the oldest church in continuous service in Argentina, and the oldest intact and functional colonial construction in Argentina. For these reasons it is a National Historic Monument.

== Location ==
The cathedral of the city of Córdoba is located in the historic center of the city, which practically coincides with the geographical center of the city; its southeast angle (which is taken as a direction reference) faces the corner of Independencia and 27 de Abril streets.

It occupies the wide block that faces the west side of Plaza San Martín (former Plaza Mayor), on its north side the great church is separated from the Cabildo by an old alley called Santa Catalina, the back of the temple faces the Rivera Indarte street, its main façade is oriented to the east-south-east, which is unique in the churches of its time.

To the north, in front of the back of the Cathedral, is the small but historic Plazoleta del Fundador with a patinated bronze sculpture representing Jerónimo Luis de Cabrera standing.

== History ==
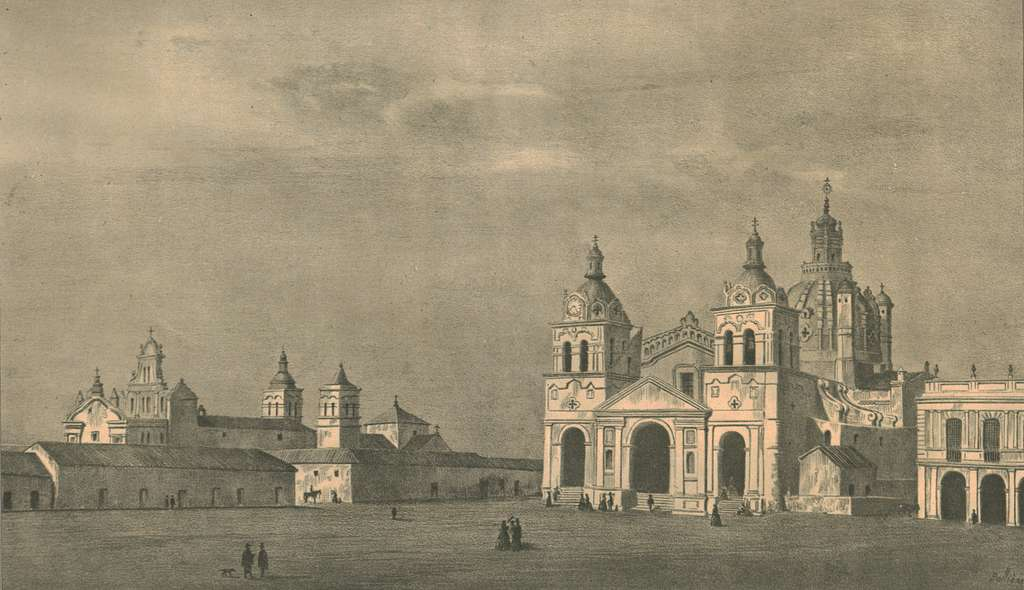
Lithograph of the Cathedral of Córdoba in 1858 by Juan León Pallière

The building itself was begun in 1582 with the name -which it still bears- of Church of Our Lady of the Assumption. In 1598 the master builder Gregorio Ferreira and the stonemason Juan Rodríguez undertook the construction of the building with sufficiently solid materials (stone, bricks and lime). In 1601, the carpenter Mateo Domínguez undertook the work of making a framework of slats and beams for the roof, while Hernando Álvarez was commissioned to supervise the manufacture of 30,000 "muslera" roof tiles, (Note: The "muslera roof tile" is called the roof tile - almost always fired in the terracotta way - whose production is so handmade that the "mold" on which it has been made is the thigh of one of the legs from its maker craftsman.)

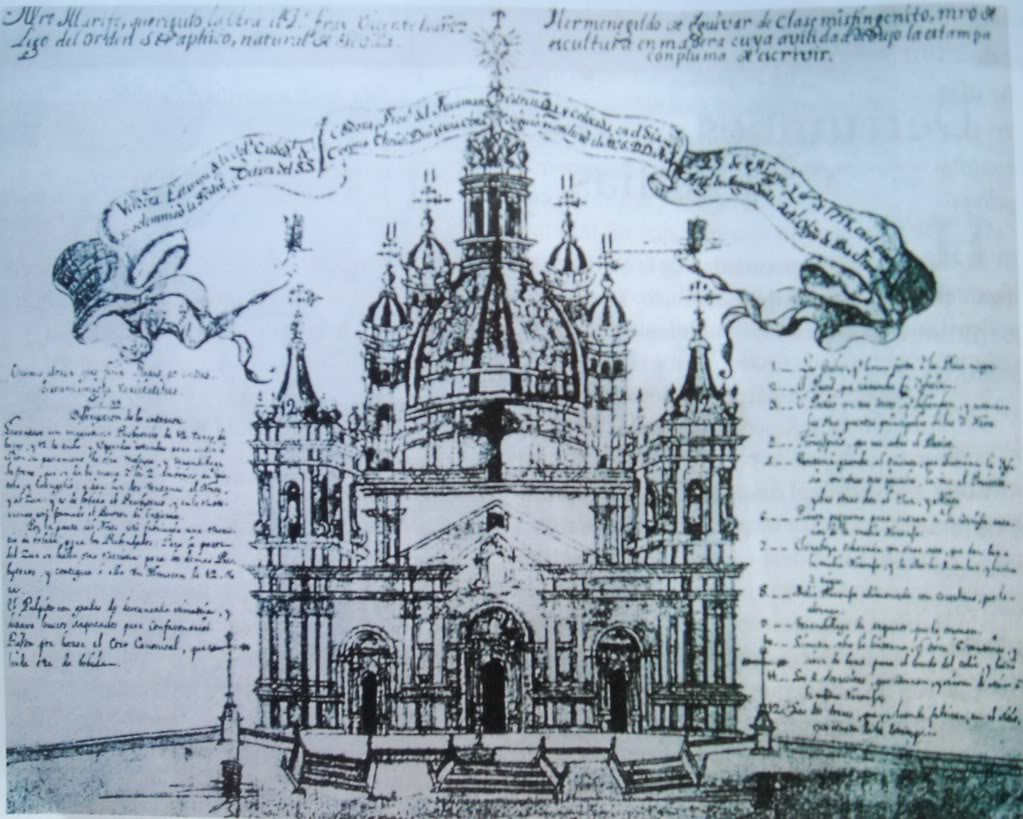
Drawing of cathedral of Córdoba of Argentina in 1759.

The direction of the work was entrusted shortly after to the Granadan architect Ricardo González Merguete who made various plans; The works gained a strong impetus thanks to the architects and Jesuits. Giovanni Battista Primoli designed the main floor plan (Latin cross of the basilica type) following the model of the almost contemporary Jesuit Church of the Gesù in Rome. In 1706 the cathedral was officially consecrated.

In 1758, the Franciscan friar Vicente Muñoz designed and directed the construction of the dome with lantern towers. More than half a century after it began, the façade was designed and completed by Andrea Bianchi in 1729.

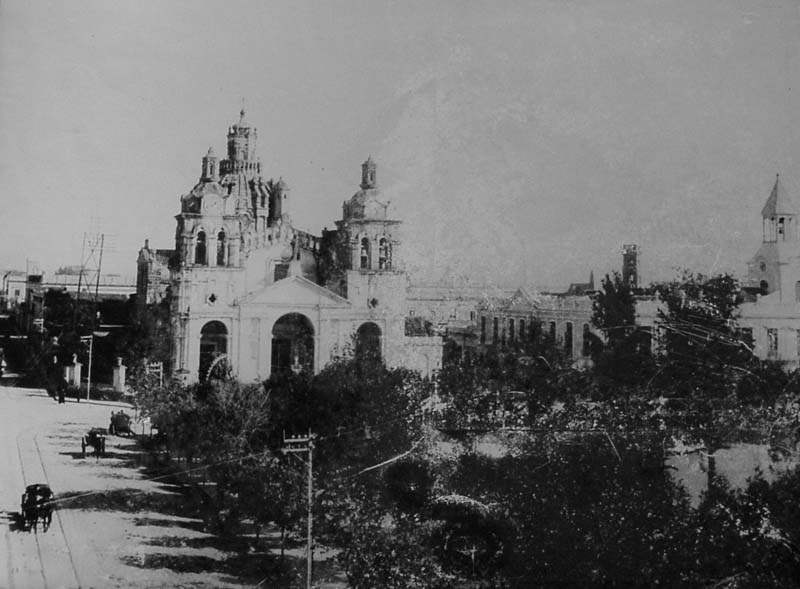
The cathedral in the 19th century

On May 18, 1758, the building was practically finished, with the naves, the narthex, the great dome, the crossings, and the great Neoclassical portico preceded by a wide staircase and closed by an artistic wrought iron portal, work exquisite workmanship in which you can see the silhouettes of Saint Peter and Saint Paul, although the two large bell towers were only finished in 1787. The large entrance door, like the choir stalls around the main altar, are Jesuit works carved in missionary cedar. The tower clock is a gift from the English railway at the end of the 19th century.

In 1901 the statue of Christ the Redeemer was added to the top of the façade, such a sculpture was forged in the Paucelae Coquet foundry in Paris, France.

The narthex of the cathedral, and adjacent crypts, would be the burial site for a number of prominent figures in the history of Córdoba Province, and the nation's. Some of these include General José María Paz (and his wife, Margarita Weild), Dean Gregorio Funes, Bishop Hernando de Trejo y Sanabria (the first rector of the University of Córdoba, the oldest in Argentina), and Friar Mamerto Esquiú.

The ornate interior, overlooked by the sterling silver altar crafted in Upper Peru (Colonial Bolivia), also includes a church tabernacle donated to the cathedral in 1804, as well as an extensive collection of silver and gold votive offerings. The interior was later decorated with frescoes and murals painted in the early years of the 20th century by Emilio Caraffa, Carlos Camilloni, and Manuel Cardeñosa.

== Main features ==
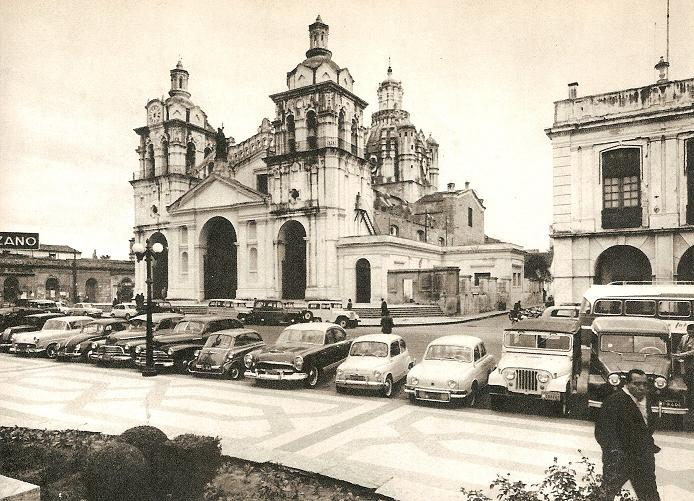
The Cathedral in 1962

The cathedral's architecture combines a variety of styles, including Renaissance, Spanish colonial Baroque, Neoclassicism and even Mudéjar details.

The main towers hold bells; that located in the southeast corner also has a large clock. Are the corners of the towers are sculpted figures playing trumpets and dressed in indigenous attire. The dome is located at the crossing. It is flanked by four octagonal turrets (which structurally serve as reinforcements). Its drum is sorrounded by columns, which carry scrolls or consoles running up the dome itself to end in stubby pinnacles. Between the columns are exotically-shaped windows. Above the dome is an elaborate lantern. The lantern is topped by a smaller dome that culminates in a large weather vane that represents the chalice and the cross.

In the narthex are the tombs of José María Paz and his wife Margarita Weild, and also the urn that holds the remains of Dean Gregorio Funes. In the crypts lie the remains of Bishop Fernando Trexo y Senabria - first rector of the first Argentine university: currently called UNC - and of Friar Mamerto Esquiú. On November 7, 2011 the presumed remains of Juan Bautista Bustos were transferred from the Church of Santo Domingo in the city of Santa Fe to the city of Córdoba and deposited with honors in the cathedral church.

The central nave has a high barrel vault embellished with carved wood and gilt mouldings. The main altar has high columns and sculptures that represent various Catholic saints. Sunlight enters mainly through a series of deep lunettes in the nave vault. The central nave is higher than the side aisles, from which it is separated by tall and wide columns, largely golden. Above the narthex is a pipe organ. The main altar is largely elaborately made with embossed silver from Colonial Bolivia.

The extensive treasury includes silver crosiers with gold details, silver and gold crowns embroidered with diamonds and pearls to "dress" the statues of the Virgin, a large tabernacle donated in 1804, brocaded silk shawls, etc. Part of the cathedral treasury was looted during the last quarter of the 20th century.

== Gallery ==
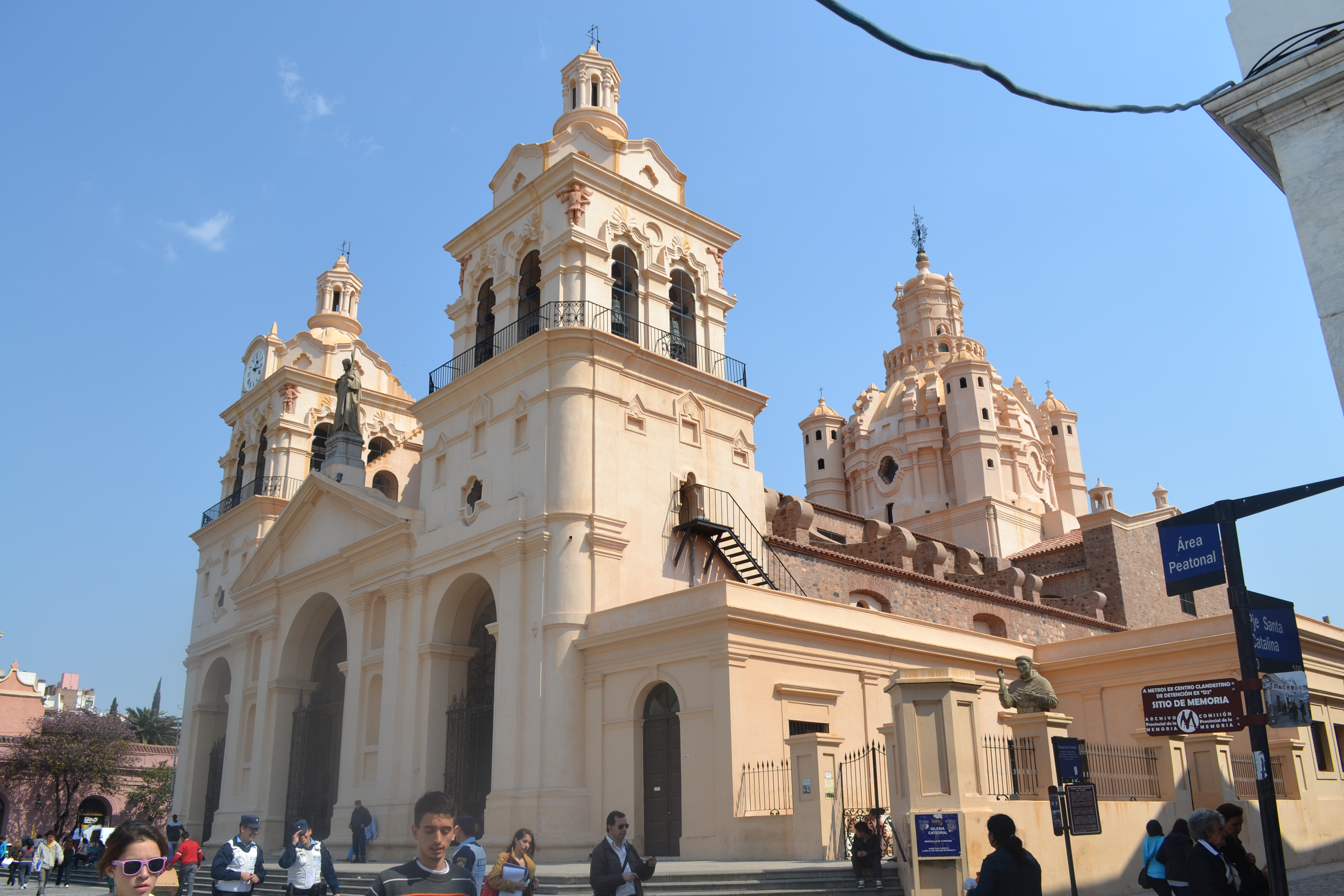
Front view

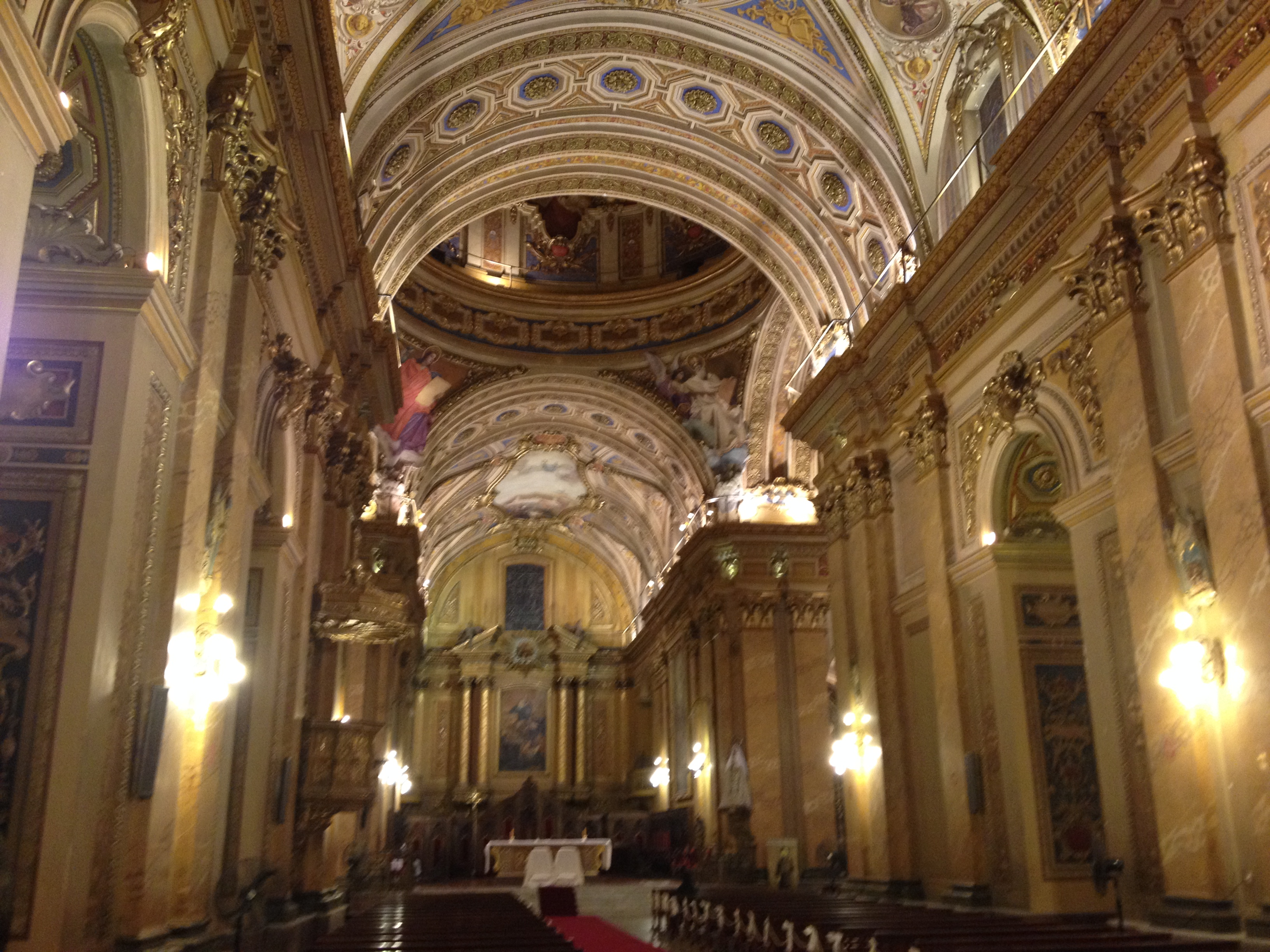
Main nave

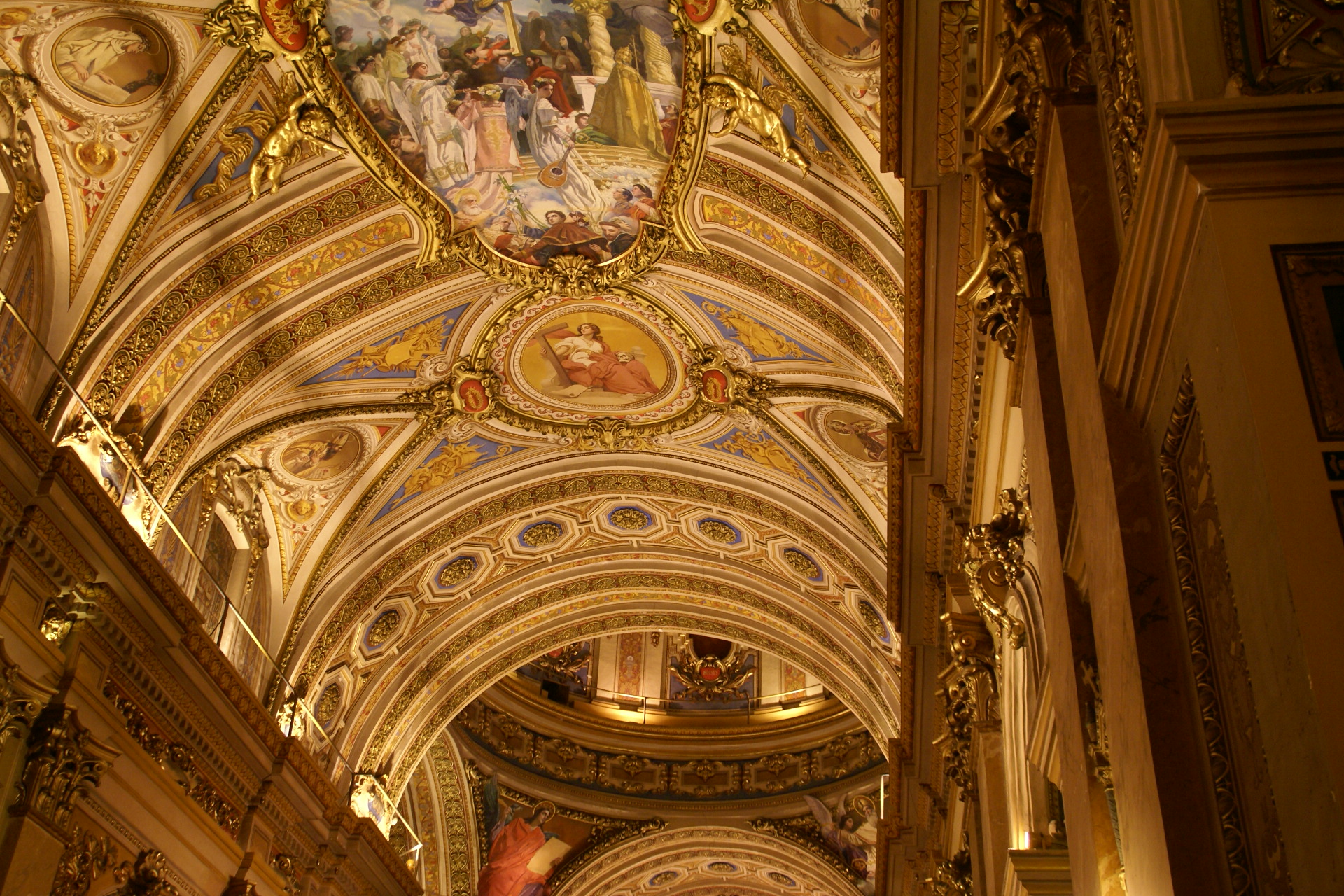
Ceiling of the main nave

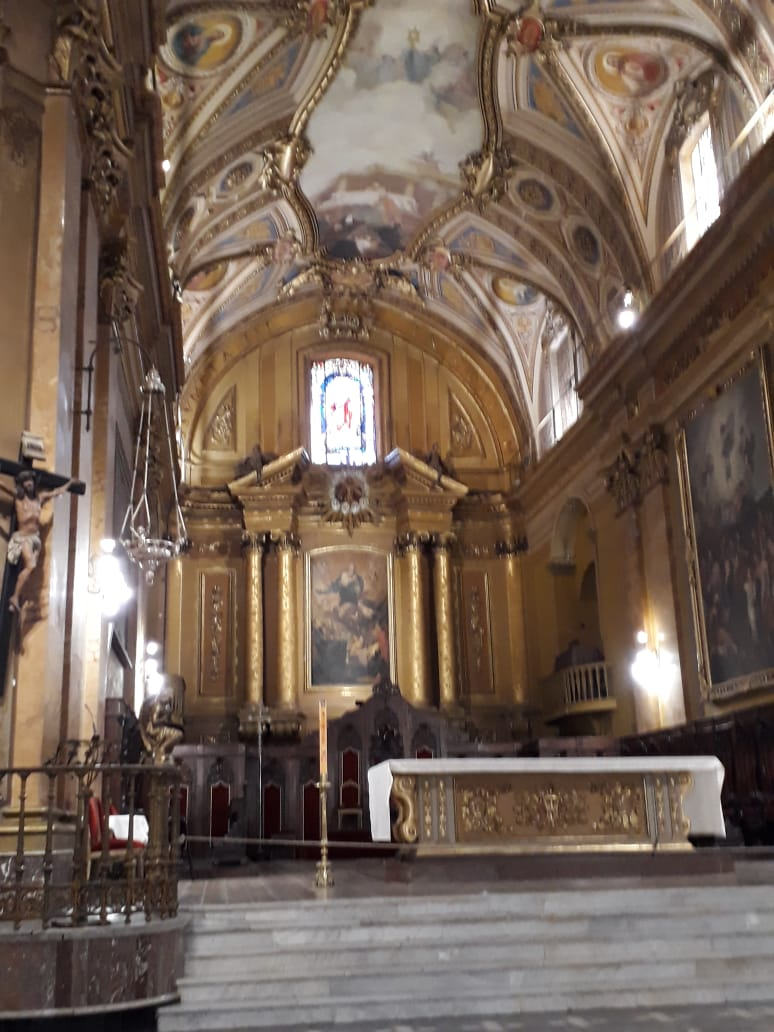
Lateral nave

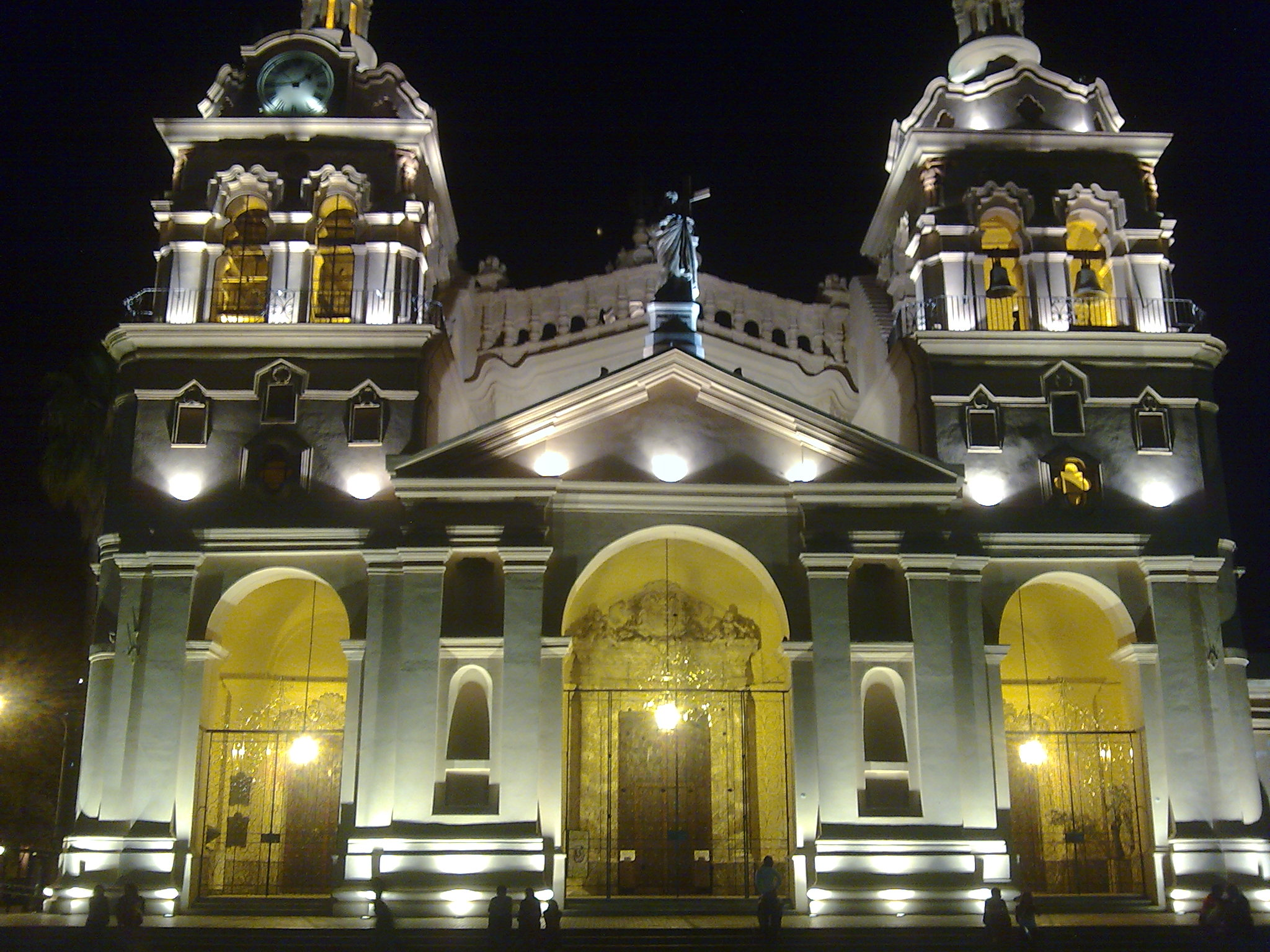
Facade at night

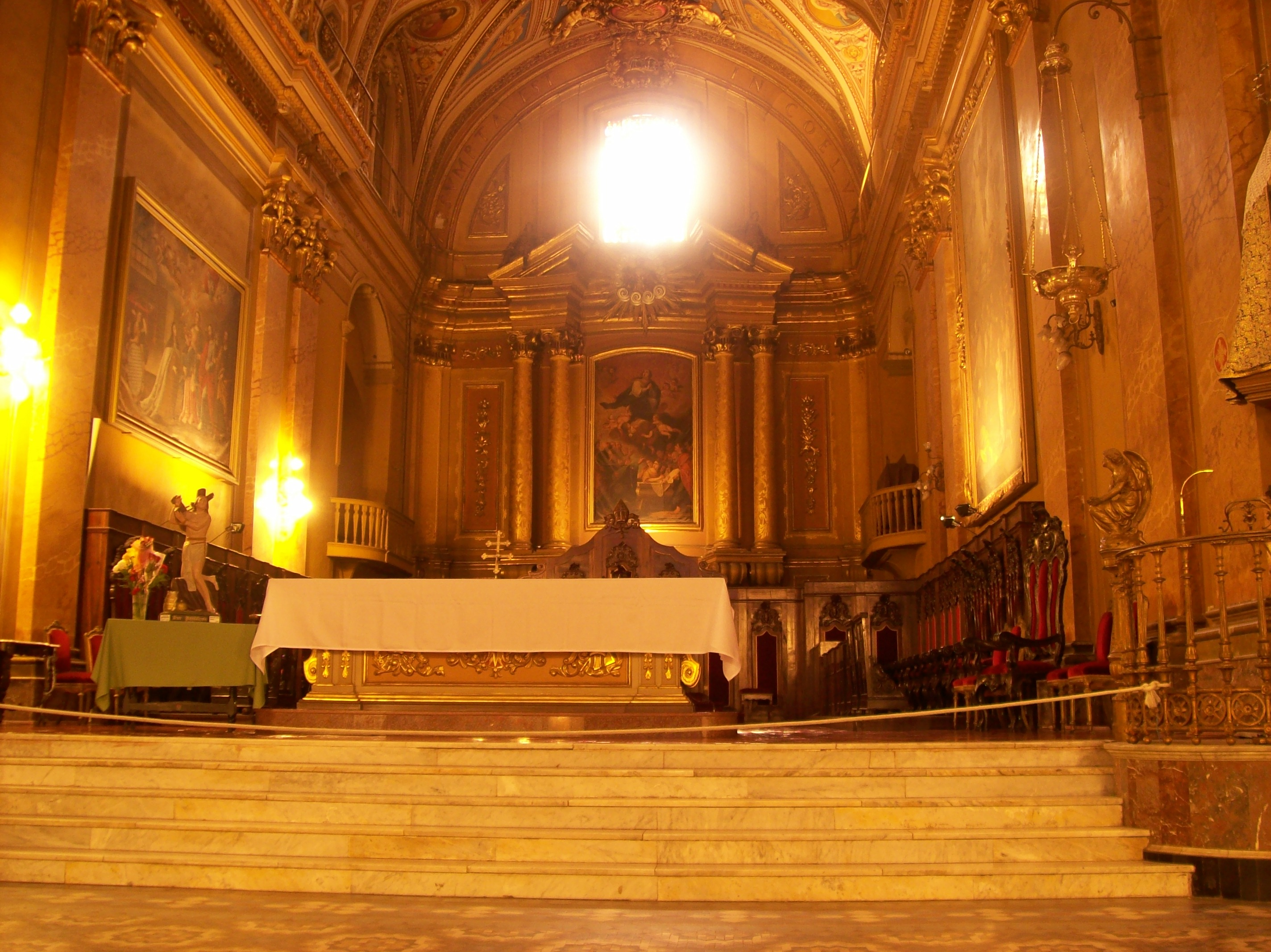
Main altar

Tower

Bell tower and Christ

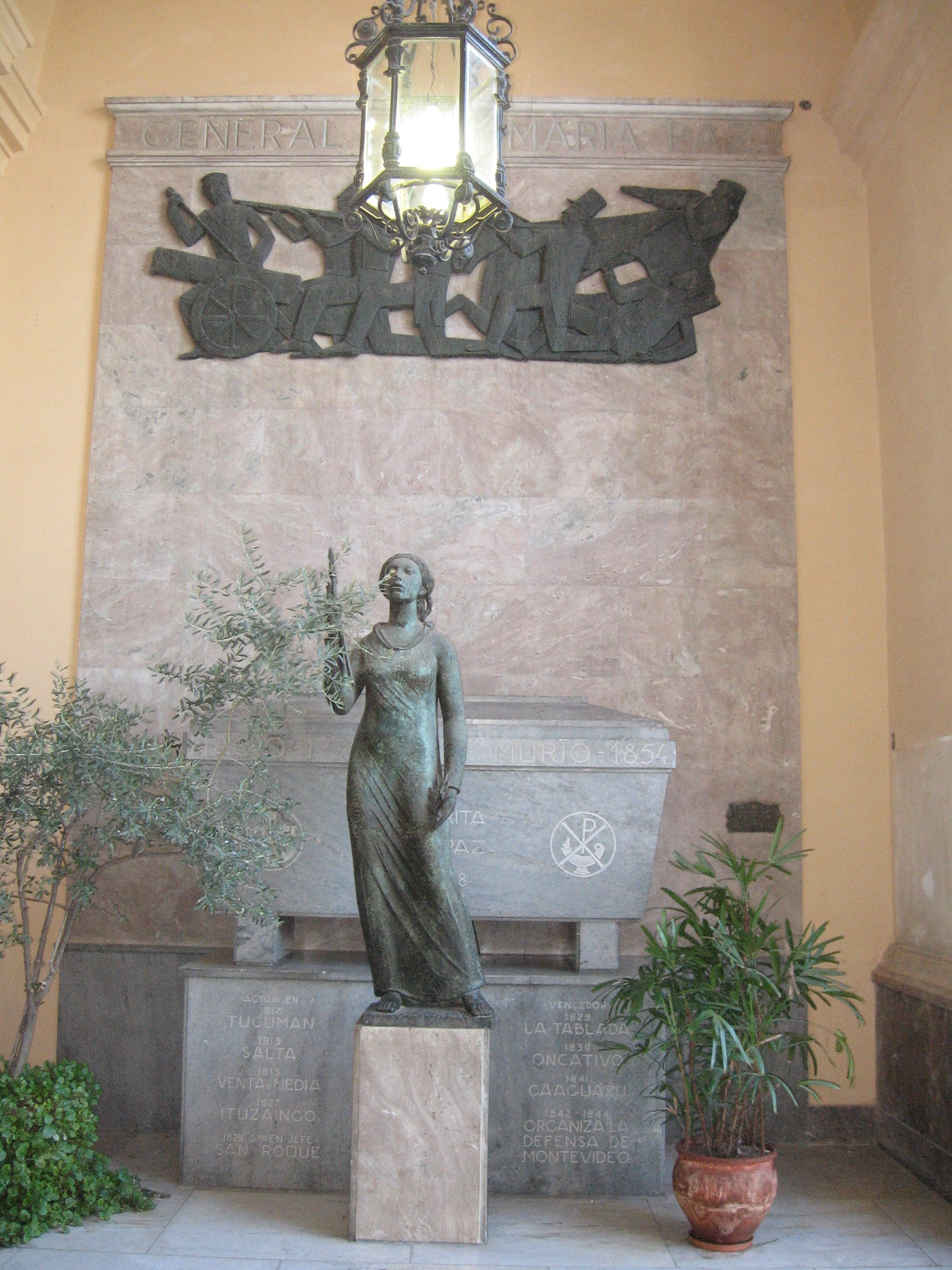
Tomb of José María Paz

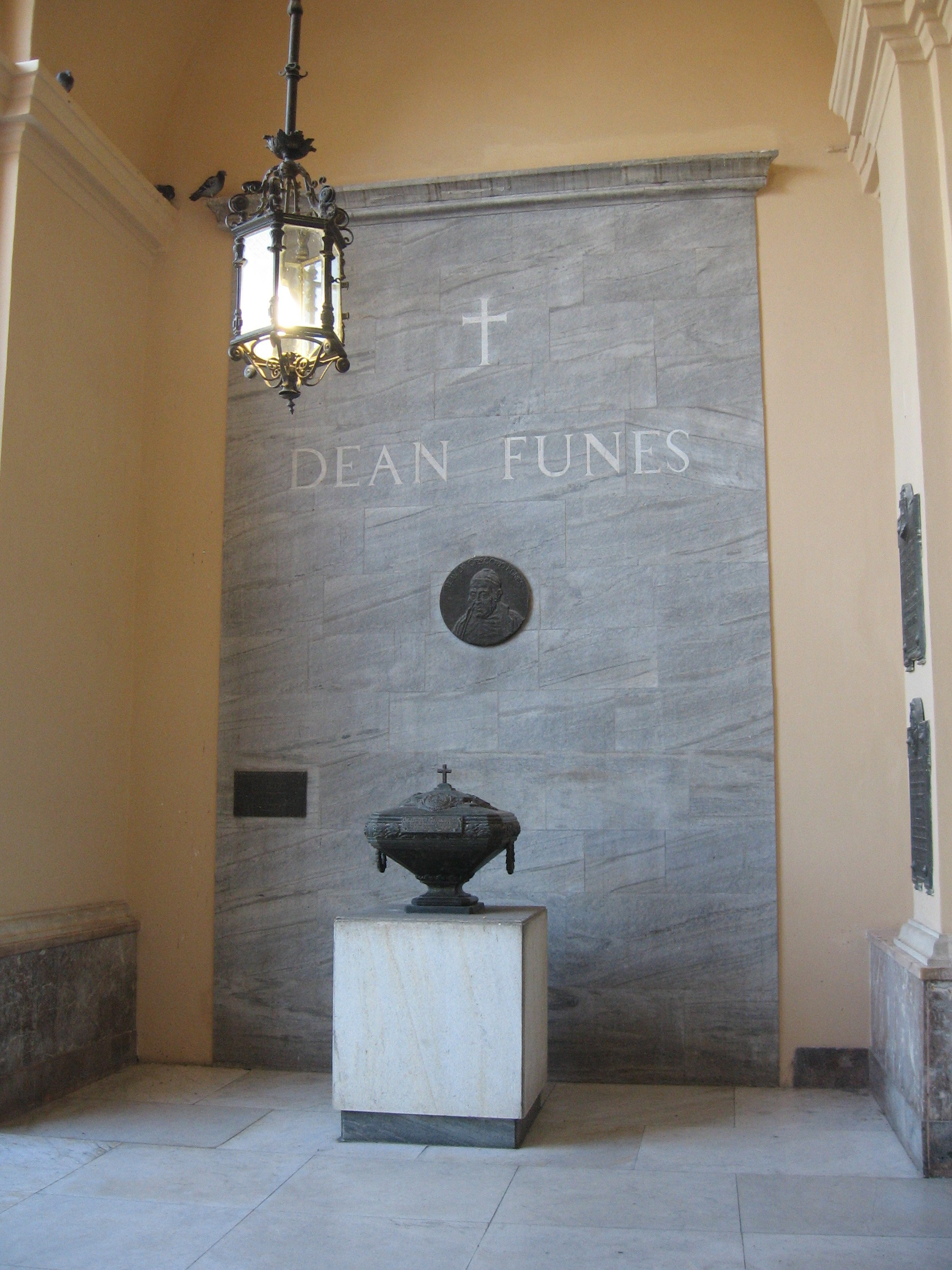
Tomb of Gregorio Funes

== See also ==
- List of tallest structures built before the 20th century
