= Santiago Copello =

Argentine Cardinal

His Eminence Santiago Copello
- Cardinal, Archbishop emeritus of Buenos Aires
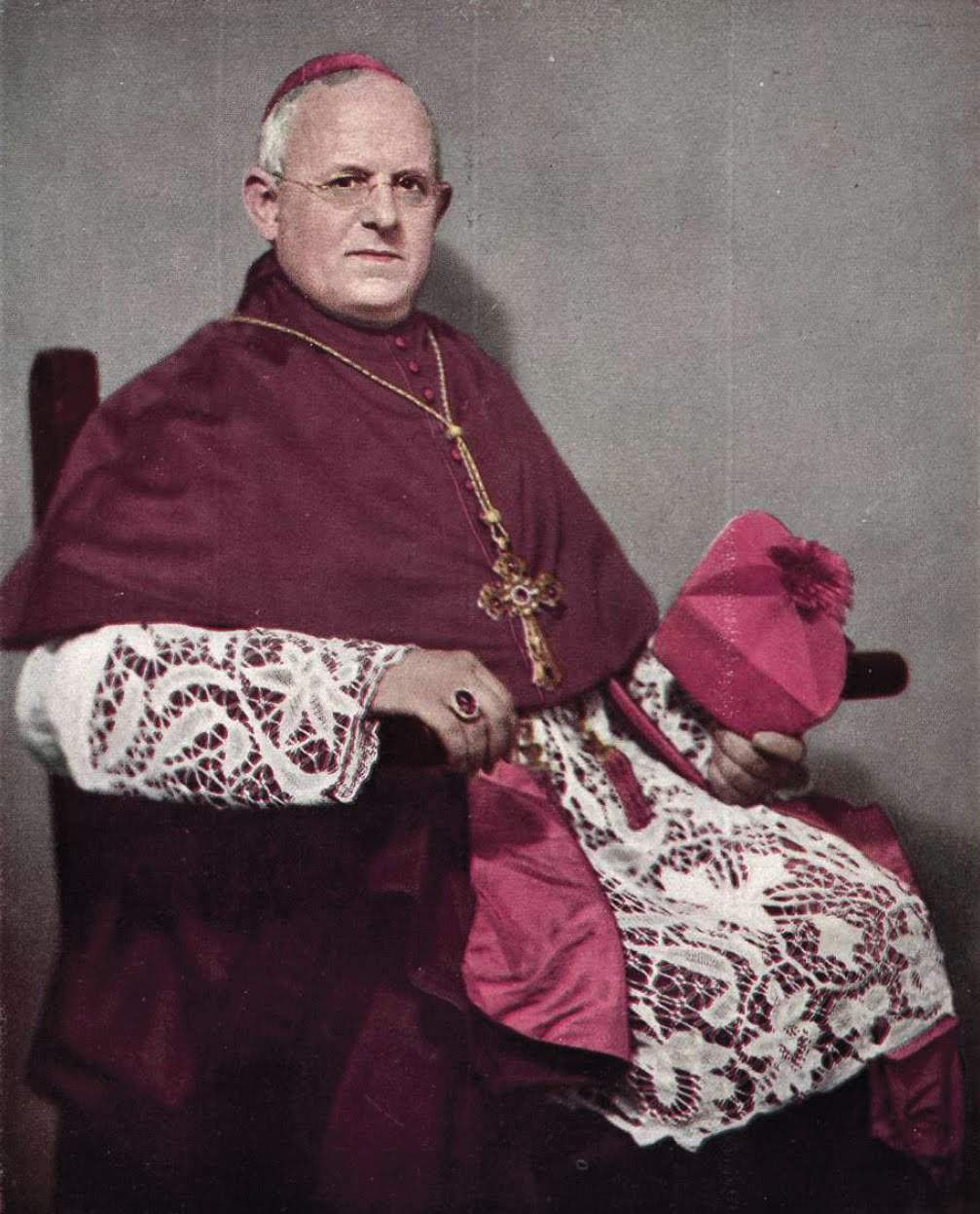
- Cardinal Copello.
- Archdiocese: Buenos Aires
- Installed: 20 September 1932
- Term ended: 25 March 1959
- Predecessor: José Bottaro y Hers
- Successor: Fermín Lafitte (ad interim); Antonio Caggiano
- Other post: Chancellor of the Holy Roman Church

Orders
- Ordination: 28 October 1902 (Priest)
- Consecration: 30 March 1919 (Archbishop)
- Created cardinal: 16 December 1935
- Rank: Cardinal-Priest of San Lorenzo in Damaso

Personal details
- Born: Santiago Luis Copello; January 7, 1880 San Isidro, Buenos Aires, Argentina
- Died: February 9, 1967 (aged 87) Rome, Italy
- Buried: Basílica Santísimo Sacramento, Retiro, Buenos Aires
- Denomination: Roman Catholic Church
- Education: Pontifical Gregorian University
- Motto: Veni Domine Jesu (Come Lord Jesus)

Styles of Santiago Copello
- Reference style: His Eminence
- Spoken style: Your Eminence
- Informal style: Cardinal
- See: Buenos Aires (emeritus)

Santiago Luis Copello (7 January 1880 – 9 February 1967) was an Argentine Cardinal of the Roman Catholic Church. He served as Archbishop of Buenos Aires from 1932 to 1959, and was elevated to the cardinalate in 1935. Copello served as the first Argentine cardinal and the first cardinal from Hispanic America.

== Biography ==
Born in San Isidro, Buenos Aires, Copello studied at the seminary in La Plata and the Pontifical Gregorian University in Rome before being ordained to the priesthood on 28 October 1902. He then did pastoral work in La Plata from 1903 to 1918.

On 8 November 1918, Copello was appointed Auxiliary Bishop of La Plata and Titular Bishop of Aulon. He received his episcopal consecration on 30 March 1919, from Bishop Juan Terrero y Escalada, with Bishops Francisco Alberti and José Orzali serving as co-consecrators. After becoming Auxiliary Bishop of Buenos Aires on 15 May 1928, Copello was named Vicar General of the same see and Vicar of the Argentine Military Ordinariate on the following June 12. He was elected Vicar Capitular on 2 August 1932, and was appointed Archbishop of Buenos Aires on 20 September of that year.

Pope Pius XI created Copello Cardinal-Priest of San Girolamo dei Croati in the consistory of 16 December 1935, making him the first cardinal from Argentina and Spanish America. Raised to the rank of Primate of the Church in Argentina on 29 January 1936, Copello was one of the cardinal electors in the 1939 papal conclave that selected Pope Pius XII. In November 1945, he prohibited Argentine Catholics from supporting parties or candidates who promoted the separation of Church and State, removing religion from public schools, or legalizing civil divorce in the February 1946 elections. Copello even had a parish priest removed from his position for criticizing President Juan Perón. After attending the first general conference of the Latin American Episcopal Conference in 1955, he was temporarily forced to take up residence in the Roman Curia as a consequence of the Peronist regime's fall.

Cardinal Copello participated in the conclave of 1958, which resulted in the election of Pope John XXIII. He resigned, after twenty-six years of service, as Buenos Aires' archbishop on 25 March 1959, and was appointed Apostolic Chancellor on the same date (remaining in that post until his death). Copello thus became Cardinal-Priest of San Lorenzo in Damaso on 14 December 1959. From 1962 to 1965, he attended the Second Vatican Council, during the course of which he served as a cardinal elector in the 1963 papal conclave that selected Pope Paul VI.

Copello died in Rome, at age 87. He is buried in the Basilica of the Holy Sacrament, located behind the Kavanagh Building in the Retiro section of Buenos Aires.

Catholic Church titles
Preceded by José Bottaro y Hers, OFM	Archbishop of Buenos Aires; 20 September 1932 – 25 March 1959	Succeeded by Fermín Lafitte
Preceded by Celso Costantini	Chancellor of the Holy Roman Church; 25 March 1959 – 9 February 1967	Succeeded by Luigi Traglia
