= Fermín Emilio Lafitte =

Argentine Roman Catholic cleric

His Excellency Fermín Emilio Lafitte
- Archbishop of Córdoba
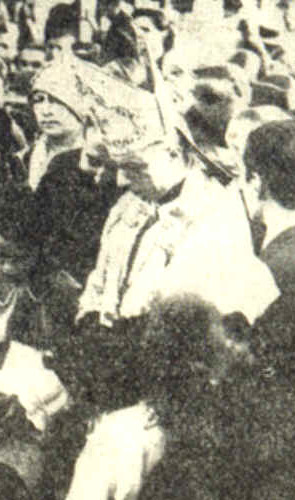
- Lafitte as Archbishop of Córdoba.
- Archdiocese: Córdoba
- Installed: April 20, 1934
- Term ended: July 8, 1957
- Predecessor: post created
- Successor: Ramón José Castellano
- Other posts: Archbishop of Buenos Aires Enthroned = March 25, 1959 Ended = August 8, 1959 Predecessor = Santiago Copello Successor = Antonio Caggiano Vicar apostolic of the Military Bishopric of Argentina (1957-58)

Orders
- Ordination: August 15, 1911 (Priest)
- Consecration: November 12, 1927 (Bishop), by Archbishop Filippo Cortesi
- Rank: Archbishop of Antiochia in Pisidia

Personal details
- Born: November 2, 1888 Peyrun, France
- Died: August 8, 1959 (aged 70) Buenos Aires
- Buried: Metropolitan Cathedral of Buenos Aires
- Denomination: Roman Catholic Church

Fermín Lafitte (November 2, 1888 – August 8, 1959) was an Argentine Roman Catholic cleric, serving as Archbishop of Córdoba and, briefly, as Archbishop of Buenos Aires.

== Biography ==
Lafitte was born in Peyrun, Hautes-Pyrénées Department, France. He emigrated to Argentina and was ordained as a priest in 1911. He was consecrated Bishop of Córdoba in 1927, and upon the establishment of the Roman Catholic Archdiocese of Córdoba in 1934 (previously subordinate to the Archdiocese of Tucumán) Lafitte was enthroned as its Archbishop. He later emerged as one of the leading conservatives in the Argentine curia, and following a rift in church–state relations in Argentina in 1954 Lafitte was among the first public figures to organize rallies opposing President Juan Perón's secular reforms. He later supported the coup that ousted Perón in 1955 (which began in Córdoba).

Lafitte was then appointed Apostolic Administrator of the Archdiocese of Buenos Aires, under its Archbishop, Cardinal Santiago Copello, in 1956. In 1958, he was made titular archbishop of Antiochia in Pisidia and Archbishop Coadjutor with right of succession, while retaining the post of Apostolic Administrator. Pope John XXIII appointed Cardinal Copello to the Apostolic Chancery on May 26, 1959, upon which the office of Archbishop of Buenos Aires automatically passed to Lafitte. Lafitte was concurrently appointed vicar of the newly created Military Bishopric of Argentina, which has special jurisdiction over members of the Armed Forces.

He was Archbishop of Buenos Aires for less than three months, as he died on August 8, 1959. The causes of his death are not publicly known, but his death occurred when he was about to hold Mass during a visit to the Naval Military School, troops were formed and the clarion was sounding when Lafitte felt dizzy and suddenly died.

His remains rest in the Metropolitan Cathedral of Buenos Aires.
