= Ángel Sixto Rossi =

Argentine Catholic prelate (born 1958)

The Most Reverend Ángel Sixto Rossi SJ
- Cardinal, Archbishop of Córdoba
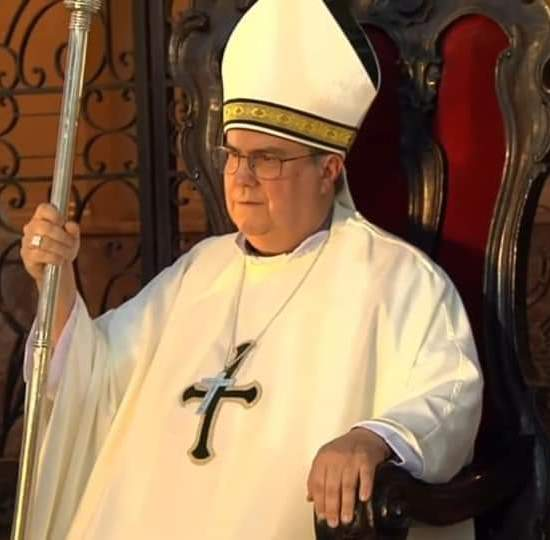
- Rossi in 2021
- Church: Roman Catholic Church
- Archdiocese: Córdoba
- See: Córdoba
- Appointed: 6 November 2021
- Installed: 17 December 2021
- Predecessor: Carlos José Ñáñez
- Other post: Cardinal Priest of Santa Bernadette Soubirous (2023-)

Orders
- Ordination: 12 December 1986
- Consecration: 17 December 2021 by Carlos José Ñáñez
- Created cardinal: 30 September 2023 by Pope Francis
- Rank: Cardinal-Priest

Personal details
- Born: Ángel Sixto Rossi; 11 August 1958 (age 68) Córdoba, Argentina
- Parents: Ángel Sixto Rossi; Delicia Ruiz Caraffa
- Education: Pontifical Gregorian University
- Motto: En todo amar y servir ("In All Things to Love and Serve)
- Coat of arms

Ángel Sixto Rossi SJ (born 11 August 1958) is an Argentine prelate of the Catholic Church who has been archbishop of Córdoba since 2021. He has been a Jesuit since 1976. Pope Francis made him a cardinal on 30 September 2023.

== Biography ==
Ángel Sixto Rossi was born on 11 August 1958 in Córdoba, Argentina, the third child of Ángel Sixto Rossi and Delicia Ruiz Caraffa. In 1976 he entered the novitiate of the Argentine Province of the Society of Jesus. After studying philosophy and theology in Argentina and Ecuador, he was ordained a priest on 12 December 1986. He earned a degree in spiritual theology at the Pontifical Gregorian University in Rome with a thesis on spiritual discernment in Saint Ignatius. He took his solemn vows as a Jesuit on 9 May 1994.

From 1990 to 1992, he was rector of the Church of El Salvador in Buenos Aires; he opened the Hogar San José for people who live on the street. In 1992, he created the Manos Abiertas Foundation, which provides help to the poorest and most vulnerable in ten cities in Argentina. From 1992 to 1995, he was novice master of the Society of Jesus, and from 2013 to 2019 he was superior of the Jesuit community residence in Córdoba.

He has offered numerous Ignatian spiritual exercises to groups of priests, religious and lay people. Before becoming a bishop, he was councillor of the Argentine-Uruguayan Province of the Society of Jesus, based in Córdoba, and as coordinator of the itinerant missionary team and spiritual assistant of the Manos Abiertas Foundation.

Coat of arms as archbishop before becoming cardinal

Pope Francis named him archbishop of Córdoba on 6 November 2021. He received his episcopal consecration on 17 December 2021 from his predecessor in Córdoba, Archbishop Carlos José Ñáñez. The coat of arms he adopted was far simpler than that of other prelates in that it did not employ the insignia that indicate his rank as a metropolitan archbishop and centered a shepherd's crook behind the shield in place of a cross.

On 9 July 2023, Pope Francis announced plans to make him a cardinal at a consistory scheduled for 30 September. At that consistory he was made cardinal priest of Santa Bernadette Soubirous. He participated as a cardinal elector in the 2025 papal conclave that elected Pope Leo XIV.

As a cardinal, he has incorporated the standard insignia of his rank as a cardinal and metropolitan archbishop into his new coat of arms, displaying it on the Facebook page of the Archdiocese of Cordoba when it announced he was taking possession of his titular church on 29 October 2023.

He is the author and co-author of numerous works on spirituality and education for both youth and adults.

== See also ==
- Cardinals created by Francis
