= Fernando Trexo y Senabria =

17th-century Catholic bishop

Most Reverend Fernando Trexo y Senabria
- Bishop of Córdoba
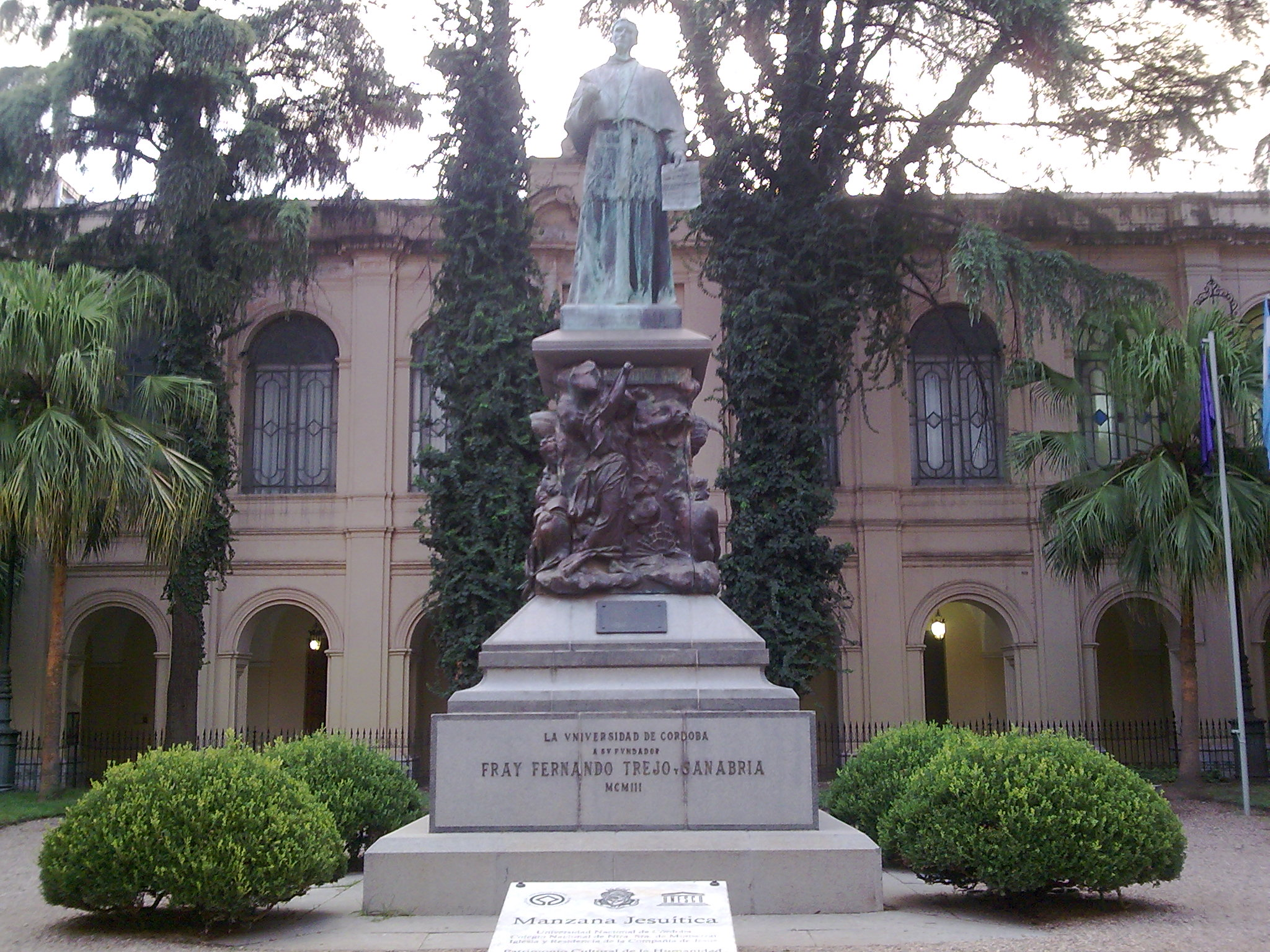
- Fernando Trexo Senabria, was a Catholic bishop.
- Church: Catholic Church
- Diocese: Diocese of Córdoba
- In office: 1595–1614
- Predecessor: Francisco de Vitoria (bishop)
- Successor: Julián de Cortázar

Orders
- Ordination: 1576
- Consecration: 16 May 1595 by Luis López de Solís

Personal details
- Born: 1547 Asunción, Paraguay
- Died: 24 December 1614 (age 67) Córdoba, Argentina

Fernando Trexo y Senabria, O.F.M. or Hernando de Trejo y Sanabria (1547–1614) was a Roman Catholic prelate who served as Bishop of Córdoba (1595–1614).

== Biography ==
Fernando Trexo y Senabria was born in Asunción, Paraguay in 1547 and ordained a priest in the Order of Friars Minor in 1576. On 13 January 1578, he was appointed during the papacy of Pope Gregory XIII as Bishop of Córdoba. On 16 May 1595, he was consecrated bishop by Luis López de Solís, Bishop of Quito. He served as Bishop of Córdoba until his death on 24 December 1614.

Catholic Church titles
Preceded by Francisco de Vitoria (bishop)	Bishop of Córdoba; 1595–1614	Succeeded by Julián de Cortázar
