= Enrique Eguía Seguí =

Argentine bishop (born 1962)

- Prelate of Deán Funes
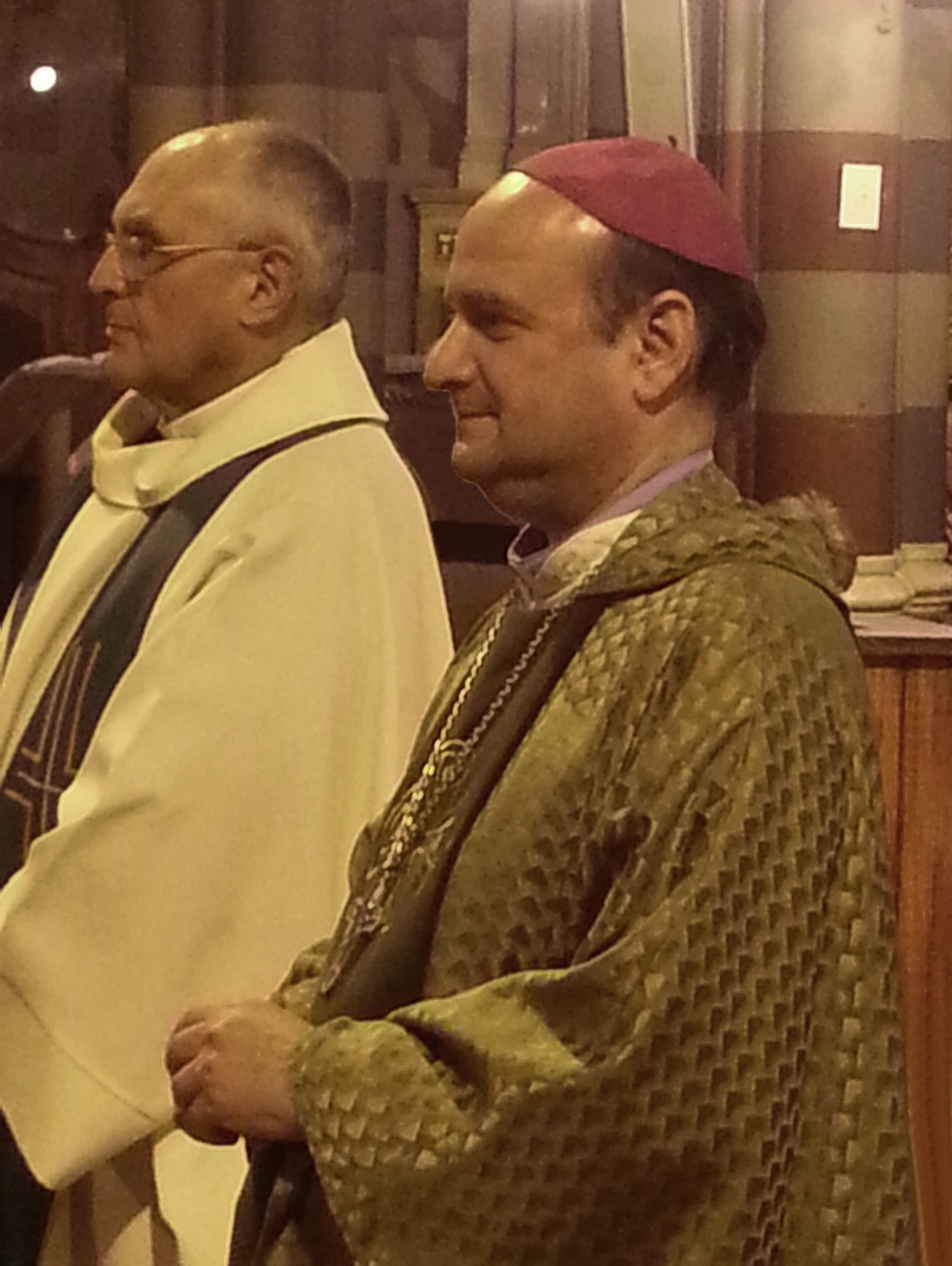
- Enrique Eguía in 2015
- Church: Catholic Church
- See: Territorial Prelature of Deán Funes
- Appointed: 28 October 2023
- Predecessor: Gustavo Gabriel Zurbriggen
- Previous posts: Titular Bishop of Cissi (2008-2023); Auxiliary Bishop of Buenos Aires (2008-2023)

Orders
- Ordination: 3 December 1988
- Consecration: 11 October 2008 by Jorge Mario Bergoglio

Personal details
- Born: 9 December 1962 (age 63) Buenos Aires, Argentina

Enrique Eguía Seguí (born 9 December 1962) is an Argentine prelate of the Roman Catholic Church. He has been auxiliary bishop of Buenos Aires since 2008.

== Life ==
Born in Buenos Aires, Eguía was ordained to the priesthood on 3 December 1988.

On 4 September 2008, he was appointed auxiliary bishop of Buenos Aires and titular bishop of Cissi. Eguía received his episcopal consecration on the following 11 October from Jorge Mario Bergoglio, archbishop of Buenos Aires, the later Pope Francis, with auxiliary Bishops Óscar Vicente Ojea Quintana, auxiliary of Buenos Aires, and Carlos María Franzini of Rafaela as co-consecrators.
