= Raúl Francisco Primatesta =

Argentine cardinal (1919–2006)

His Eminence Raúl Francisco Primatesta
- Archbishop Emeritus of Córdoba
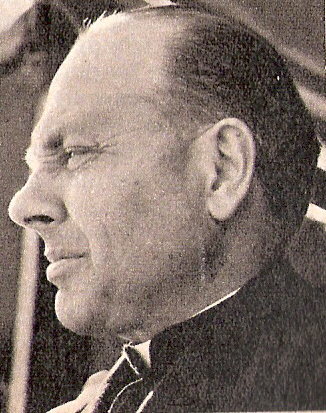
- The cardinal in November 1976.
- Church: Roman Catholic Church
- Archdiocese: Córdoba
- See: Córdoba
- Appointed: 16 February 1965
- Term ended: 17 November 1998
- Predecessor: Ramón José Castellano
- Successor: Carlos José Ñáñez
- Other post: Cardinal-Priest of Beata Maria Vergine Addolorata a piazza Buenos Aires (1973-2006)
- Previous posts: Titular Bishop of Tanais (1957-61); Auxiliary Bishop of La Plata (1957-61); Bishop of San Rafael (1961-65); President of the Argentine Episcopal Conference (1976-82; 1985-90)

Orders
- Ordination: 25 October 1942 by Luigi Traglia
- Consecration: 15 August 1957 by Antonio José Plaza
- Created cardinal: 5 March 1973 by Pope Paul VI
- Rank: Cardinal-Priest

Personal details
- Born: Raúl Francisco Primatesta; 14 April 1919 Capilla del Señor, Argentina
- Died: 1 May 2006 (aged 87) Córdoba, Argentina
- Buried: Nuestra Señora de la Asunción
- Education: Pontifical Gregorian University; Pontifical Biblical Institute
- Motto: Parare
- Coat of arms

Raúl Francisco Primatesta (April 14, 1919 – May 1, 2006) was a cardinal of the Roman Catholic Church of Argentina, and Archbishop Emeritus of Córdoba.

== Biography ==
Primatesta was born in Capilla del Señor, Exaltación de la Cruz, province of Buenos Aires. He was ordained priest in 1942 and elected titular bishop of Tanais and appointed auxiliary bishop of La Plata on June 14, 1957 and became its vicar general. On June 12, 1961 he was appointed first bishop of Diocese of San Rafael, Mendoza, and four years later on February 16, 1965 he became Metropolitan archbishop of Córdoba. Since 1970 he was part of the ruling body of the Argentine Episcopal Conference, which he presided on four occasions.

Primatesta was elevated to Cardinal-Priest of Santa Maria Addolorata a Piazza Buenos Aires on March 5, 1973 by Pope Paul VI. He participated in the conclaves that elected popes John Paul I and John Paul II in 1978. As required when he turned 75 in 1994 he presented his resignation, but John Paul II accepted it only in 1998. Primatesta continued presiding the Social Pastoral Commission of the Episcopal Conference until 2002.

Primatesta suffered from a chronic heart condition. He underwent heart surgery in 1995 and had to have blocks removed from two arteries in January 2005. In April 2005 he had to be hospitalized for two weeks.

He died during the first hours of May 1, 2006, at the age of 87, in his private home in Córdoba, after a complication of his cardiovascular condition. His funeral was conducted in the Cathedral of Córdoba, where he was then buried. The provincial government decreed three days of mourning.

=== Political involvement ===
Cardinal Primatesta was considered very influential in the internal workings of the Argentine Church and its relationship to the national government. He was linked to top figures of the military dictatorship of the Proceso; after its downfall in 1983 he defended the stance of the Catholic hierarchy at the time, and opposed institutional self-criticism for it, which the Church only started after Primatesta lost his dominant position. Bishop Emeritus of Morón, Justo Laguna, called Primatesta "a man of little commitment" (un hombre de jugarse poco) and noted that the Cardinal never took a clear position on the issue of Bishop Enrique Angelelli's murder in 1976.

María Elba Martínez, a human rights advocate and lawyer, stated after the Cardinal's death that "Primatesta took a large part of the truth [about the dictatorship] to his grave, mainly about the desaparecidos, the kidnapping of children and the complicity of the ecclesiastic hierarchy with the dictatorship, with the goal of dismembering or weakening the Third World movements of the Second Vatican Council". Martínez further said that Primatesta "was useful" to the military, and that he had "named people" for them.

During the 1990s, Cardinal Primatesta was a strong critic of the neoliberal policies of President Carlos Menem (1989–1999), whom he charged with leaving behind a massive amount of poverty. While in charge of the Social Pastoral Commission he asked for a "social agreement" to overcome the economic crisis of Argentina, and organized discussion meetings for union leaders, businessmen and government representatives. Primatesta mediated also on many social conflicts, including cases where unemployed families took the Cathedral of Córdoba.

On a different note, the Cardinal defended the position of the Church on contraception to the point of denouncing Córdoba Governor Ramón Mestre at the top of his voice for a provincial health program that included handing out condoms near the seat of the Archbishopric.

Catholic Church titles
Preceded by none	Bishop of San Rafael; June 12, 1961–February 16, 1965	Succeeded by Jorge Carlos Carreras
Preceded by Ramón José Castellano	Archbishop of Córdoba; February 16, 1965 — November 17, 1998	Succeeded by Carlos José Ñáñez
