= La Puebla de Almoradiel =

Coordinates: 39°36′N 3°06′W

- municipality
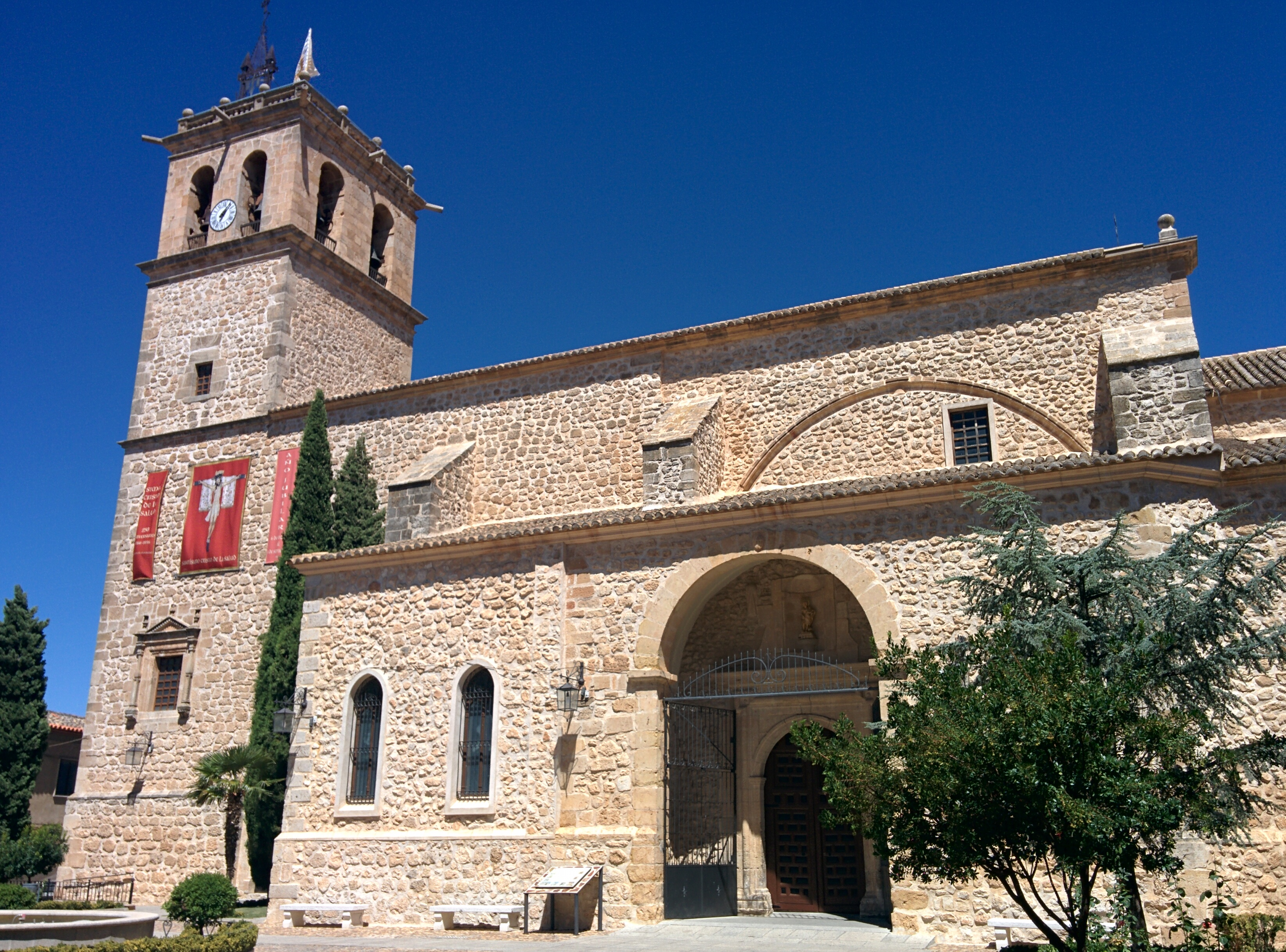

- Coat of arms
- Interactive map of La Puebla de Almoradiel
- Country: Spain
- Autonomous community: Castile-La Mancha
- Province: Toledo
- Municipality: La Puebla de Almoradiel

Area
  - Total: 106 km^{2} (41 sq mi)
- Elevation: 695 m (2,280 ft)

Population (2025-01-01)
  - Total: 4,950
  - Density: 46.7/km^{2} (121/sq mi)
- Time zone: UTC+1 (CET)
  - Summer (DST): UTC+2 (CEST)

La Puebla de Almoradiel is a municipality located in the province of Toledo, Castile-La Mancha, Spain. According to the 2006 census (INE), the municipality has a population of 5770 inhabitants.
