= Archdiocese of Córdoba =

Catholic ecclesiastical territory

Coordinates: 31.4167°S 64.1849°W

Archdiocese of Córdoba in Argentina Archidioecesis Cordubensis in Argentina Arquidiócesis de Córdoba

Catholic
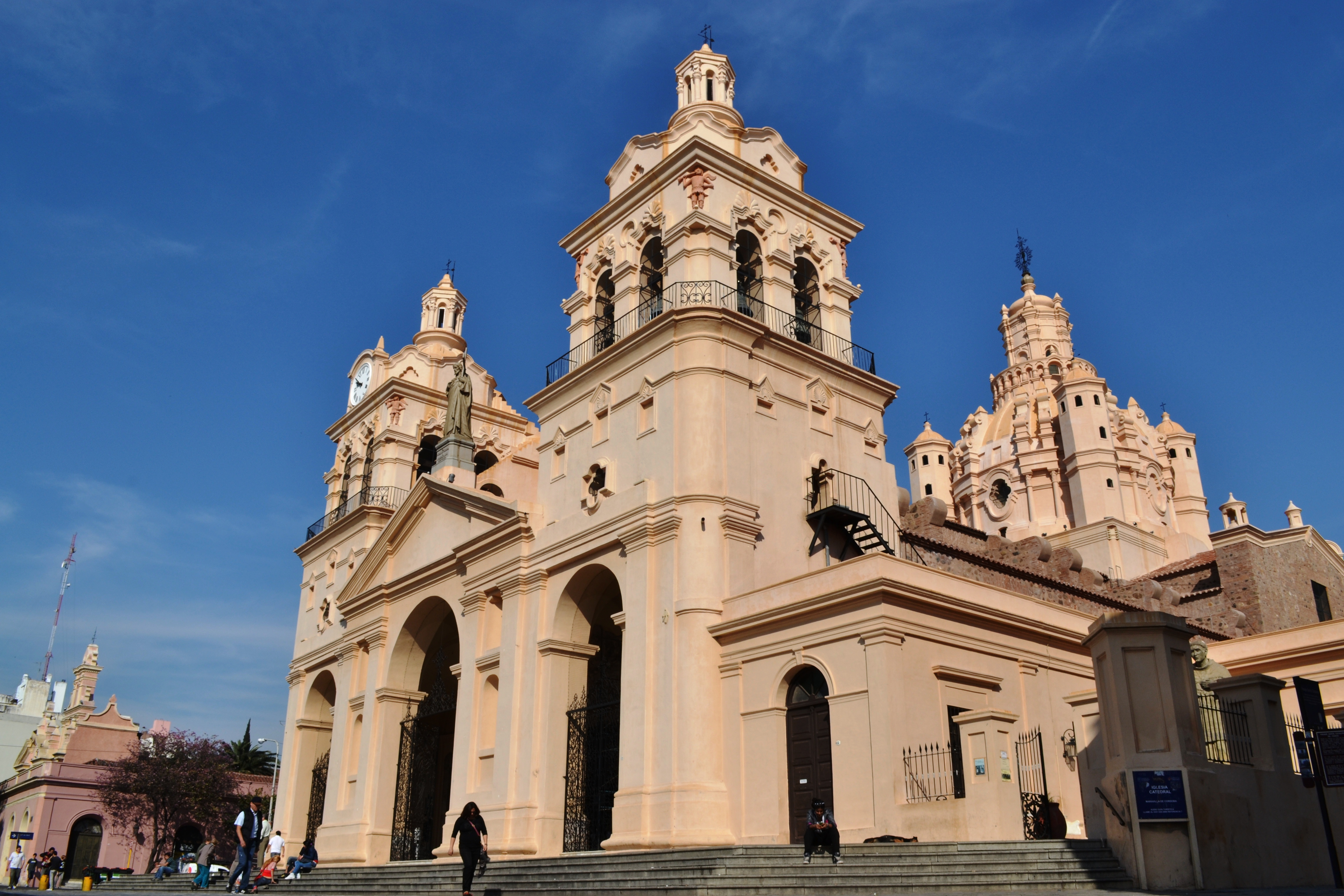
- Cathedral of Our Lady of the Assumption

Location
- Country: Argentina
- Ecclesiastical province: Córdoba

Statistics
- Area: 19,722 km^{2} (7,615 sq mi)
- Population: Total; Catholics: (as of 2006); 2,016,000; 1,814,000 (90%)
- Parishes: 114

Information
- Denomination: Roman Catholic
- Rite: Roman Rite
- Established: 10 May 1570 (456 years ago)
- Cathedral: Cathedral of the Assumption in Córdoba, Argentina
- Patron saint: Our Lady of the Rosary

Current leadership
- Pope: Leo XIV
- Metropolitan Archbishop: Ángel Sixto Rossi, S.J.
- Auxiliary Bishops: Ricardo Orlando Seirutti García; Horacio José Álvarez; Alejandro Musolino
- Bishops emeritus: Carlos José Ñáñez

Map

Website
- Archdiocese of Cordoba on Facebook

The Roman Catholic Archdiocese of Córdoba (erected 10 May 1570, as the Diocese of Tucumán) is in Argentina and is a metropolitan diocese and its suffragan sees include Cruz del Eje, San Francisco, Villa de la Concepción del Río Cuarto and Villa María as well as the Territorial Prelature of Deán Funes. The first see of this diocese, until 1697–1699, was in Santiago del Estero: its name was changed in diocese of Córdoba only in 1806 after Salta became an independent see with the original territory of Tucumán. It was elevated on 20 April 1934.

== Bishops ==
=== Ordinaries ===
- Francisco Beaumonte, OFM (10 May 1570 Appointed – ); did not take effect
- Jerónimo Albornoz, OFM (1570–1574)
- Jerónimo de Villa Carrillo, OFM (27 Mar 1577 Appointed – )
- Francisco de Vitoria, OP (1578–1592)
- Fernando Trexo y Senabria, OFM (1594–1614)
- Julián de Cortázar (1617–1625), appointed Archbishop of Santafé en Nueva Granada
- Tomás de la Torre Gibaja, (Tomás de Torres) OP (1628–1630)
- Melchor Maldonado y Saavedra, OSA (1631–1662)
- Francisco de Borja (1668–1679), appointed Bishop of Trujillo
- Nicolás de Ulloa y Hurtado de Mendoza, OSA (1679–1686)
- Juan Bravo Dávila y Cartagena (1687–1691)
- Juan Manuel Mercadillo, OP (1694–1704)
- Manuel González Virtus (1708–1710)
- Alonso del Pozo y Silva (1713–1723), appointed Bishop of Santiago de Chile
- José Manuel de Sarricolea y Olea (1723–1730), appointed Bishop of Santiago de Chile
- José Antonio Gutiérrez y Ceballos (1730–1740), appointed Archbishop of Lima
- Pedro Miguel Argandoña Pastene Salazar (1745–1762), appointed Archbishop of La Plata o Charcas
- Manuel de Abad e Illanar, OPraem (1762–1771), appointed Bishop of Arequipa
- Juan Manuel Moscoso y Peralta (1771–1778), appointed Bishop of Cuzco
- José Campos Julián, OCD (1778–1789), appointed Archbishop of La Plata o Charcas
- Angel Mariano Moscoso Pérez y Oblitas (1787–1804)
- Rodrigo Antonio de Orellana, OPraem (1805–1818), appointed Bishop of Ávila
- Benito Lascano y Castillo (1836–1836)
- José Gregorio Baigorria (1857–1858)
- José Vicente Ramírez de Arellano (1858–1873)
- Eduardo Manuel Alvarez (1876–1878)
- Mamerto Esquiú Medina, OFM (1880–1883)
- Juan José Blas Tissera, OFM (1884–1886)
- Reinaldo Toro, OP (1888–1904)
- Zenón Bustos y Ferreyra, OFM (1904–1925)
- Fermín Emilio Lafitte (1927–1958), appointed Coadjutor Archbishop of Buenos Aires
- Ramón José Castellano (1958–1965)
- Raúl Francisco Primatesta (1965–1998); elevated to Cardinal in 1973
- Carlos José Ñáñez (1998–2021)
- Ángel Sixto Rossi, SJ (2021–present)

=== Auxiliary bishops ===
- Benito Lascano y Castillo (1830–1836), appointed Bishop here
- José Hurtado de Mendoza (1842–1851); never consecrated?
- Uladislao Javier Castellano (1892–1895), appointed Archbishop of Buenos Aires
- Rosendo de la Lastra y Gordillo (1892–1898), appointed Bishop of Paraná
- Aquilino Ferreyra y Álvarez (1899–1910)
- Filemón Cabanillas (1899–1913)
- Inocencio Dávila y Matos (1914–1927), appointed Bishop of Catamarca
- José Anselmo Luque (1914–1930)
- Leopoldo Buteler (1932–1934), appointed Bishop of Río Cuarto
- Ramón José Castellano (1945–1958), appointed Archbishop here
- Horacio Arturo Gómez Dávila (1958–1960), appointed Coadjutor Bishop of La Rioja
- Enrique Ángel Angelelli Carletti (1960–1968), appointed Bishop of La Rioja; beatified in 2019
- Cándido Genaro Rubiolo (1974–1977), appointed Bishop of Villa María
- Alfredo Guillermo Disandro (1975–1980), appointed Bishop of Villa María
- Estanislao Esteban Karlic (1977–1983), appointed Coadjutor Archbishop of Paraná; future Cardinal
- Jesús Arturo Roldán (1980–1991), appointed Bishop of San Rafael
- Elmer Osmar Ramón Miani (1983–1989), appointed Bishop of Catamarca
- José María Arancibia (1987–1993), appointed Coadjutor Archbishop of Mendoza
- Carlos José Ñáñez (1990–1995), appointed Coadjutor Archbishop of Tucumán (later returned here as Archbishop)
- Roberto Rodríguez (1992–1998), appointed Bishop of Villa María
- José Ángel Rovai (1999–2006), appointed Bishop of Villa María
- Pedro Javier Torres Aliaga (2013–
- Ricardo Orlando Seirutti García (2015–
- Horacio José Álvarez (2023–) (nomination)
- Alejandro Musolino SDB (2023–) (nomination)

=== Other priests of this diocese who became bishops ===
- Nicolás Videla del Pino, appointed Bishop of Paraguay (o Ssma Assunzione) in 1802
- Juan Martín Janiz (Yáñez) y Paz, appointed Bishop of Santiago del Estero in 1910
- Filemón Francisco Castellano, appointed Bishop of Lomas de Zamora in 1957
- Marcelo Raúl Martorell, appointed Bishop of Puerto Iguazú in 2006
- Marcelo Alejandro Cuenca Revuelta, appointed Bishop of Alto Valle del Río Negro in 2010
- Samuel Jofré Giraudo, appointed Bishop of Villa Maria in 2013
- Roberto Pío Álvarez, appointed Auxiliary Bishop of Comodoro Rivadavia in 2017

== Territorial losses ==
| Year | Along with | To form |
|---|---|---|
| 1806 | | Diocese of Salta |
| 1826 | | Vicariate Apostolic of San Juan de Cuyo |
| 1934 | | Diocese of Río Cuarto; Diocese of La Rioja |
| 1957 | | Diocese of Villa María |
| 1961 | | Diocese of San Francisco |
| 1963 | | Diocese of Cruz del Eje |

== External links and references ==
- "Archdiocese of Córdoba". Catholic-Hierarchy.

Specific
