= Carlos José Ñáñez =

Former archbishop of Córdoba

The Most Reverend Carlos José Ñáñez
- Archbishop Emeritus of Córdoba
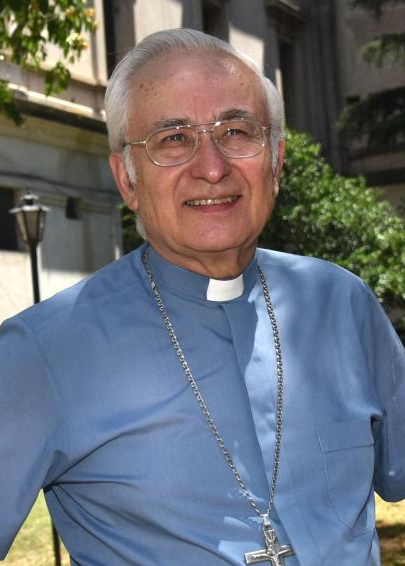
- Church: Roman Catholic Church
- Archdiocese: Córdoba
- See: Córdoba
- Appointed: 17 November 1998
- Installed: 12 March 1999
- Term ended: 6 November 2021
- Predecessor: Raúl Francisco Primatesta
- Successor: Ángel Sixto Rossi
- Previous posts: Titular Bishop of Lete (1990-95); Auxiliary Bishop of Córdoba (1990-95); Coadjutor Archbishop of Tucumán (1995-98)

Orders
- Ordination: 17 July 1971 by Raúl Francisco Primatesta
- Consecration: 24 January 1991 by Raúl Francisco Primatesta

Personal details
- Born: Carlos José Ñáñez; 9 August 1946 (age 80) Córdoba, Argentina
- Education: Pontifical Gregorian University
- Motto: Pax et gaudium in Spiritu
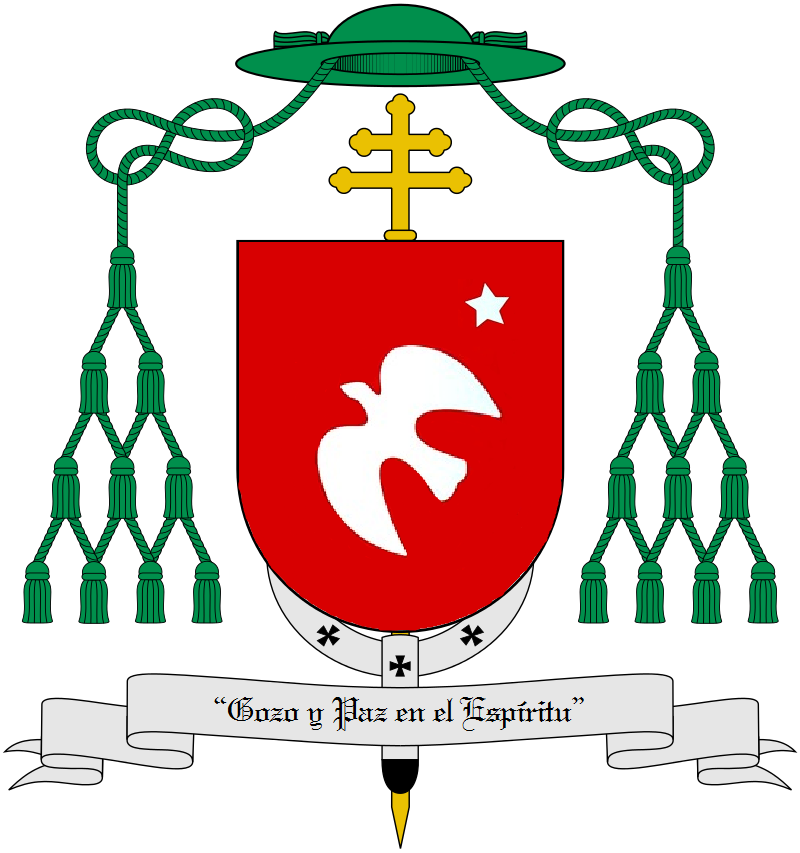
- Coat of arms

Carlos José Ñáñez (born August 9, 1946) is an Argentinian prelate of the Roman Catholic Church. He served as Auxiliary Bishop of Córdoba from 1990 to 1995 when he was appointed Archbishop Coadjutor of Tucumán. He was Archbishop of Córdoba from 1998 to 2021.

== Life ==
Born in Córdoba, Ñáñez was ordained to the priesthood on July 17, 1971.

On December 12, 1990, he was appointed Auxiliary Bishop of Córdoba and titular bishop of Leye. Ñáñez received his episcopal consecration on January 24, 1991, from Cardinal Raúl Francisco Primatesta, Archbishop of Córdoba, with the Apostolic Nuncio to Argentina, Archbishop Ubaldo Calabresi, and the Bishop of Río Cuarto, Adolfo Roque Esteban Arana, as co-consecrators.

On December 20, 1995, he was appointed Archbishop Coadjutor of Tucumán, where he was installed on February 2, 1996. On November 17, 1998, he was appointed Archbishop of Córdoba, and he was installed there on March 12, 1999.

On July 22, 2014, Pope Francis appointed Ñáñez to a five-year renewable term as a member of the Pontifical Council for Promoting Christian Unity.
