= Marcelo Daniel Colombo =

The Most Reverend Marcelo Daniel Colombo
- Archbishop of Mendoza
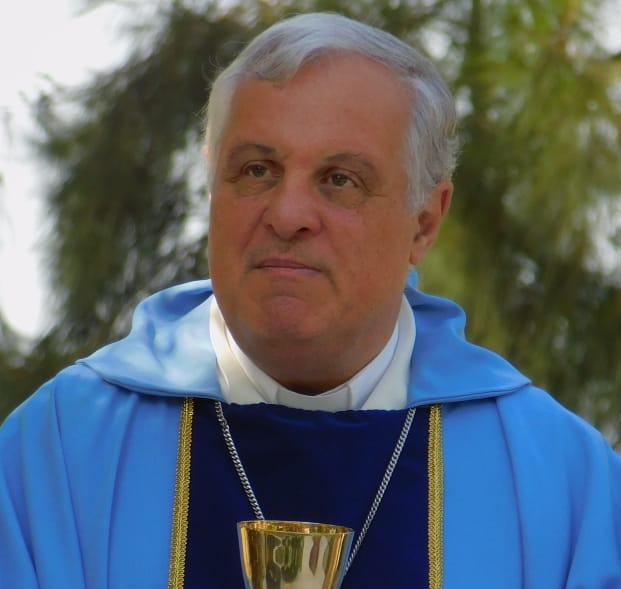
- Colombo in 2022
- Church: Catholic Church
- Archdiocese: Mendoza
- See: Mendoza
- Appointed: 22 May 2018
- Predecessor: Carlos María Franzini
- Other post: President of the Argentine Episcopal Conference (2024–)
- Previous posts: Bishop of Orán (2009-13); Bishop of La Rioja (2013-18)

Orders
- Ordination: 16 December 1988 by Jorge Novak
- Consecration: 8 August 2009 by Luis Teodorico Stöckler

Personal details
- Born: 27 March 1961 (age 65) Buenos Aires, Argentina
- Education: Pontifical University of Saint Thomas Aquinas
- Motto: Conságralos en la veridad
- Coat of arms

Marcelo Daniel Colombo (born 27 March 1961) is an Argentine prelate of the Catholic Church who has been archbishop of Mendoza since 2018. He has been a bishop since 2009, serving as bishop of Orán from 2009 to 2013 and as bishop of La Rioja from 2013 to 2018.

== Biography ==
Marcelo Colombo was born in Buenos Aires, Argentina, on 27 March 1961. He completed his early education at San Francisco de Sales school in Buenos Aires. He earned a law degree at the University of Buenos Aires in 1989. He completed his philosophy studies at the Faculty of Theology of the Catholic University of Argentina and theology studies at the Center for Philosophical and Theological Studies in Quilmes. (Note: Quilmes is an outlying district of the metropolitan area of Buenos Aires.) He was ordained a priest by Jorge Novak, Bishop of Quilmes, on 16 December 1988. He earned a licentiate in canon law from the Pontifical Gregorian University in 1994 and obtained a doctorate in canon law from the Pontifical University of Saint Thomas Aquinas in 1995.

He was parish vicar of the cathedral of Quilmes in 1988; parish administrator of Bernal in 1990; pastoral director of the parish of Our Lady of Itati in Berazategui in 1994; director of the Marriage Encounter Movement in 1997; a member of the Consiglio per gli Ordini in 2000; legal and technical assessor of the Curia in 2001; diocesan provicar for education in 2002; a member of the College of Cinsultors in 2004; assistant in the secretariat for the family in 2005; vicar for evangelization in 2007. At the Diocesan Seminary of Quilmes, he was formator in 1988, vice rector in 1995 and rector in 1996. He served on the priests' council from 1991 and the pastoral council from 1995. From 1996 to 2001, he was a judge on the Interdiocesan Church Tribunal for the La Plata region. He was the parish priest and rector of the cathedral in Quilmes from 2004 to 2009.

On 8 May 2009, Pope Benedict XVI appointed him bishop of Orán. He received his episcopal consecration from Luis Teodorico Stöckler, the bishop of Quilmes, on 8 August. The co-consecrators were Mario Antonio Cargnello, archbishop of Salta, and Jorge Rubén Lugones, bishop of Lomas de Zamora. He was installed in his diocese on 22 August 2009.

On 9 July 2013, Pope Francis appointed him bishop of La Rioja. He celebrated his installation Mass there on 7 September.

On 22 May 2018, Pope Francis named him Archbishop of Mendoza. He was installed there on 11 August.

Within the Argentine Episcopal Conference he has been elected to a series of three-year terms: as second vice president on 7 November 2017, as first vice president on 10 November 2021, and as president on 13 November 2024.
