= Gustavo Oscar Zanchetta =

Argentine prelate (born 1964)

- Bishop Emeritus of Orán
- Church: Catholic Church
- Diocese: Diocese of Orán
- In office: 23 July 2013 – 1 August 2017
- Predecessor: Marcelo Daniel Colombo
- Successor: Luis Antonio Scozzina
- Other post: Official within the Administration of the Patrimony of the Apostolic See (2017-2021)

Orders
- Ordination: 13 December 1991 by Jorge Novak
- Consecration: 19 August 2013 by Andrés Stanovnik

Personal details
- Born: 28 February 1964 (age 62) Rosario, Santa Fe Province, Argentina

Gustavo Oscar Zanchetta (born 28 February 1964) is an Argentine prelate of the Catholic Church who served as Bishop of Orán from 2013 to 2017, when Pope Francis demanded his resignation because of his failure as a leader of his priests. Assigned to an administrative position in the Roman Curia, Zanchetta was charged in 2019 with the sexual assault of two adult seminarians while bishop of Orán. He was convicted in March 2022 and sentenced to four and a half years under house arrest. The result of Church proceedings against him has not been announced.

== Biography ==
Gustavo Oscar Zanchetta was born on 28 February 1964 in Rosario in the province of Santa Fe. On 20 December 1982, he was awarded his electrician mechanic's diploma at the Industrial Institute of La Cumbre in Córdoba. He then trained for several years with the Capuchins in Quilmes. He completed his first year studying philosophy at the Argentine Catholic University in 1984 and then studied at the Reina de los Apóstoles Seminary in Quilmes and the Santo Toribio de Mogrovejo Philosophical and Theological Center in Quilmes. He was ordained a priest on 13 December 1991 by Bishop Jorge Novak of Quilmes.

He was an assistant parish priest and then parish priest of San Francisco de Asís and parish administrator of Nuestra Señora del Puente in Berazategui; director of the seminary's preparatory course; treasurer of the Major Seminary; secretary to the bishop emeritus of Quilmes after 2011; professor in the Sacred Sciences Faculty and the Quilmes Seminary; and councilor of the Christian Family Movement. In 2000 he obtained a licentiate in fundamental theology from the Pontifical Gregorian University.

In 1993, he became secretary of the Commission for Ministries of the Argentine Bishops Conference and by 2013 he was undersecretary of the Conference. where he worked with then-Cardinal Bergoglio, who led the conference from 2005-2011.

On 23 July 2013, Pope Francis appointed him bishop of Orán. He was one of the pope's earliest episcopal appointments. He received his episcopal consecration on 19 August from Andrés Stanovnik, archbishop of Corrientes. He was named to a five-year term on the Argentine Bishops Conference commission for the Argentine Catholic University in 2014. (Note: Members are normally appointed to commissions for three-year terms. The University commission is an exception.)

On 1 August 2017, Pope Francis accepted his resignation as bishop of Orán. Both the resignation and its acceptance were described as "precipitous", and Zanchetta's announcement of his departure cited health issues that prevented him from serving properly as bishop. (Note: He wrote: "For a long time a health problem has not allowed me to fully carry out the pastoral ministry that was entrusted to me, especially considering the vast extension of our diocesan territory, and the enormous challenges that we have as a Church in the north of the country.") He immediately moved from Orán to the bishop's residence in Corrientes. Pope Francis later said he had asked for his resignation after formal complaints had been filed against him, which were described as "his troubles handling the relationships with the diocesan clergy" and "accusations of authoritarianism". Pope Francis said he then sent Zanchetta to Spain for a psychiatric evaluation, which proved normal and determined he was capable of management duties, but since monthly re-evaluations in Spain were recommended it seemed advisable to find him work in Rome rather than in Argentina.

On 19 December 2017, Zanchetta was named to a post as councilor (assessore) in the Administration of the Patrimony of the Holy See (APSA), the Vatican's central bank, a position that had not existed until his appointment.

== Sexual abuse case ==
In 2015, one of Zanchetta's secretaries reported finding sexually explicit images on his cell phone, including some depicting "young people" having sex and lewd images of Zanchetta. Pope Francis summoned Zanchetta to Rome in October 2015. Pope Francis said in May 2019 that Zanchetta had claimed that his cell phone had been hacked and he determined that the evidence against Zanchetta left room for doubt. (Note: With respect to the images on Zanchetta's cell phone, Pope Francis used the Latin phrase in dubio pro reo, the principle that doubts are resolved in favor of the accused.)

On 4 January 2019, Vatican spokesman Alessandro Gisotti announced that Zanchetta had been suspended from his Curial position because of accusations of abuse, which he left unspecified. In March 2019, Carlos Alberto Sánchez, Archbishop of Tucumán, conducted interviews in northern Argentina on behalf of the Congregation for Bishops. On 28 May 2019, Pope Francis told an interviewer that he had read Sánchez' report, had determined a full trial by the Congregation for the Doctrine of the Faith was warranted, and said it would start soon.

On 8 June 2019, Argentine prosecutors charged Zanchetta with sexually abusing two seminarians. He was ordered to submit to a psychiatric examination, to surrender his passport and to establish a residence in Argentina. On 28 August 2019, Zanchetta's travel ban was lifted and he returned to Rome.

On 7 November 2019, police raided the offices of the Diocese of Orán seeking evidence against Zanchetta for defrauding the state by misusing government funds. (Note: "Public records show that Zanchetta received over one million pesos, close to $250,000 at the time, from the provincial government for the restoration of a parish rectory and for a series of lectures in the local seminary that never took place.")

By June 2020, Zanchetta had resumed working at APSA, while visiting Argentina for judicial proceedings as required. Judicial proceedings were slowed by the COVID-19 pandemic. By June 2021 he was no longer working at APSA.

The Vatican delivered files requested by the Argentine court on 18 February 2022. The trial began on 21 February 2022. About 40 witnesses were scheduled to testify in the course of a week. The alleged victims were not identified by name and testified without Zanchetta or the press in court. One of them said Zanchetta had made "amorous proposals". Witnesses included Zanchetta's driver and a number of priests, one a whom described Zanchetta getting individual seminarians drunk. One witness testified that Zanchetta asked seminarians for massages and gave "hugs that, in general, were from behind and lasted longer than necessary". Zanchetta testified and denied his guilt.

On 4 March 2022, Zanchetta was convicted of aggravated continued sexual abuse and sentenced to four and a half years in prison. He was ordered to be taken into custody. (Note: The crime of which Zanchetta was found guilty was "continued simple sexual abuse aggravated by being committed by a minister of religious worship".)

The Argentine Bishops Conference asked for forgiveness and expressed its commitment to the elimination of abuse. His successor in Orán, Bishop Luis Antonio Scozzina apologized to the victims and called for reconciliation "to heal the wounds caused by gestures and attitudes of authoritarianism and abuse of power".

In July 2022, the Orán trial court granted Zanchetta's request that, because of his health, he be allowed to serve his sentence under house arrest in a residence for retired priests. Zanchetta had been hospitalized for a month, and his attorney described his condition as "severe hypertension aggravated by aneurysm in the renal arteries".

Nothing is known of canonical proceedings against Zanchetta. Pope Francis had indicated in May 2019 that the Congregation for the Doctrine of the Faith (CDF) would start its own trial soon. The CDF does not reveal its findings while issues remain unresolved in other courts.

In 2025 Argentine judges rejected an appeal against his conviction for sexual abuse of seminarians. Despite his criminal conviction, Zanchetta has faced no known disciplinary measures from Church authorities raising criticism from local Catholics and drawing international attention because of Pope Francis’ personal involvement in the case.
