= Territorial Prelature of Humahuaca =

Catholic particular church territory

Territorial Prelature of Humahuaca Territorialis Praelatura Humahuacensis Prelatura Territorial de Humahuaca

Catholic
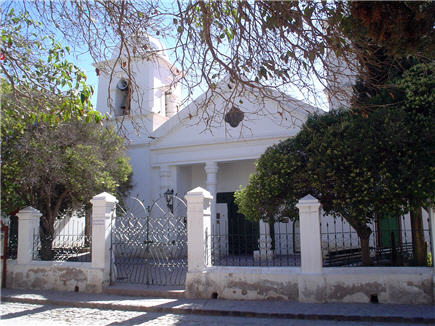
- Cathedral of Our Lady of Candelaria

Location
- Country: Argentina
- Ecclesiastical province: Salta
- Metropolitan: Salta

Statistics
- Area: 34,000 km^{2} (13,000 sq mi)
- Population: Total; Catholics: (as of 2004); 95,000; 80,000 (84.2%)
- Parishes: 11

Information
- Denomination: Roman Catholic
- Rite: Roman Rite
- Established: 8 September 1969 (220 years ago)
- Cathedral: Cathedral of Our Lady of Candelaria in Humahuaca
- Patron saint: Virgin of Candelaria; St Anthony of Padua

Current leadership
- Pope: Leo XIV
- Prelate: Florencio Félix Paredes Cruz
- Metropolitan Archbishop: Mario Antonio Cargnello
- Bishops emeritus: Pedro María Olmedo Rivero

The Roman Catholic Territorial Prelature of Humahuaca (Latin: Praelatura Territorialis Humahuacensis) is in Argentina and is a suffragan of the Archdiocese of Salta.

== History ==
On 8 September 1969, Pope Paul VI established the Territorial Prelature of Humahuaca from territory taken from the Diocese of Jujuy and the Archdiocese of Salta.

== Ordinaries ==
- José María Márquez Bernal, C.M.F. (10 October 1973 – 20 February 1991)
- Pedro María Olmedo Rivero, C.M.F. (7 July 1993 – 23 October 2019)
- Florencio Félix Paredes Cruz, C.R.L. (23 October 2019 – present)
  - 10 March 2018 appointed Territorial Prelate Coadjutor
