= Bernabé Piedrabuena =

Bernabé Piedrabuena may refer to:

- Bernabé Piedrabuena (bishop) (1863–1942), Argentine bishop
- Bernabé Piedrabuena (soldier) (died 1841), Argentine general and governor of Tucuman Province
