= Diocese of Jujuy =

Catholic ecclesiastical territory

Coordinates: 24.1855°S 65.3003°W

Diocese of Jujuy Dioecesis Iuiuyensis Diócesis de Jujuy

Catholic
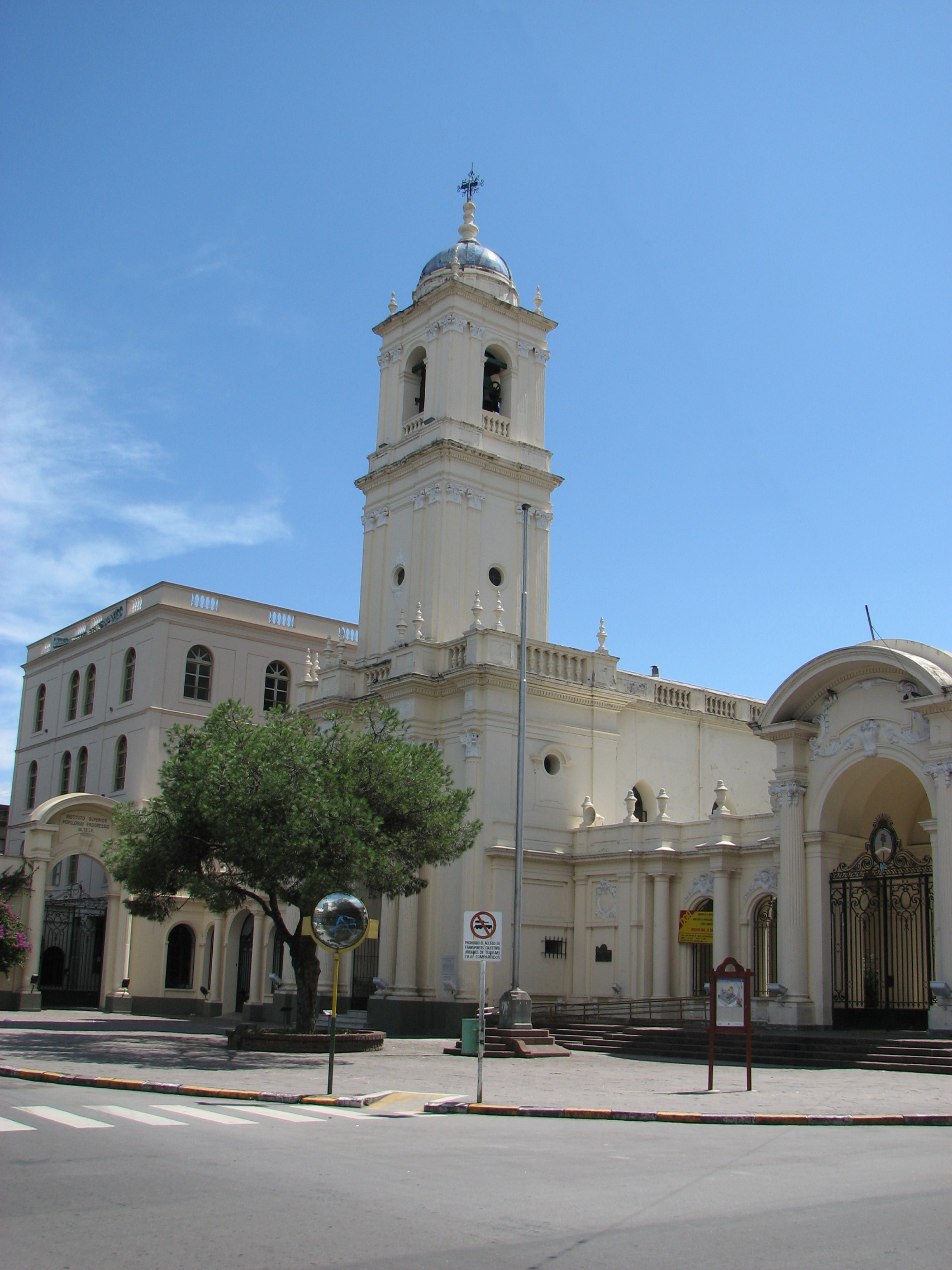
- Cathedral Basilica of the Holy Saviour

Location
- Country: Argentina
- Ecclesiastical province: Salta
- Metropolitan: Salta

Statistics
- Area: 20,082 km^{2} (7,754 sq mi)
- Population: Total; Catholics: (as of 2011); 580,000; 524,000 (90.3%)
- Parishes: 36

Information
- Denomination: Roman Catholic
- Rite: Roman Rite
- Established: 20 April 1934 (92 years ago)
- Cathedral: Cathedral Basilica of the Holy Saviour in San Salvador de Jujuy
- Patron saint: Our Lady of the Rosary

Current leadership
- Pope: Leo XIV
- Bishop: César Daniel Fernández
- Metropolitan Archbishop: Mario Antonio Cargnello

The Roman Catholic Diocese of Jujuy (Latin: Dioecesis Iuiuyensis) is in the city of San Salvador de Jujuy, Argentina and is a suffragan of the Archdiocese of Salta.

== History ==
On 20 April 1934, Pope Pius XI established the Diocese of Jujuy from the Diocese of Salta. It lost territory to the Territorial Prelature of Humahuaca when it was created in 1969.

== Bishops ==
=== Ordinaries ===
- Enrique José Mühn, S.V.D. (1934–1965)
- José Miguel Medina (1965–1983)
- Raúl Arsenio Casado (1983–1994)
- Marcelino Palentini, S.C.I. (1995–2011)
- César Daniel Fernández (since 2012)

=== Coadjutor bishop ===
- Agustín Adolfo Herrera (1961-1965), did not succeed to see; appointed Bishop of San Francisco

== Territorial losses ==
Year	Along with	To form
1969		Territorial Prelature of Humahuaca
