= Diocese of Catamarca =

Catholic ecclesiastical territory

Coordinates: 28.4689°S 65.7801°W

Diocese of Catamarca Dioecesis Catamarcensis Diócesis de Catamarca

Catholic
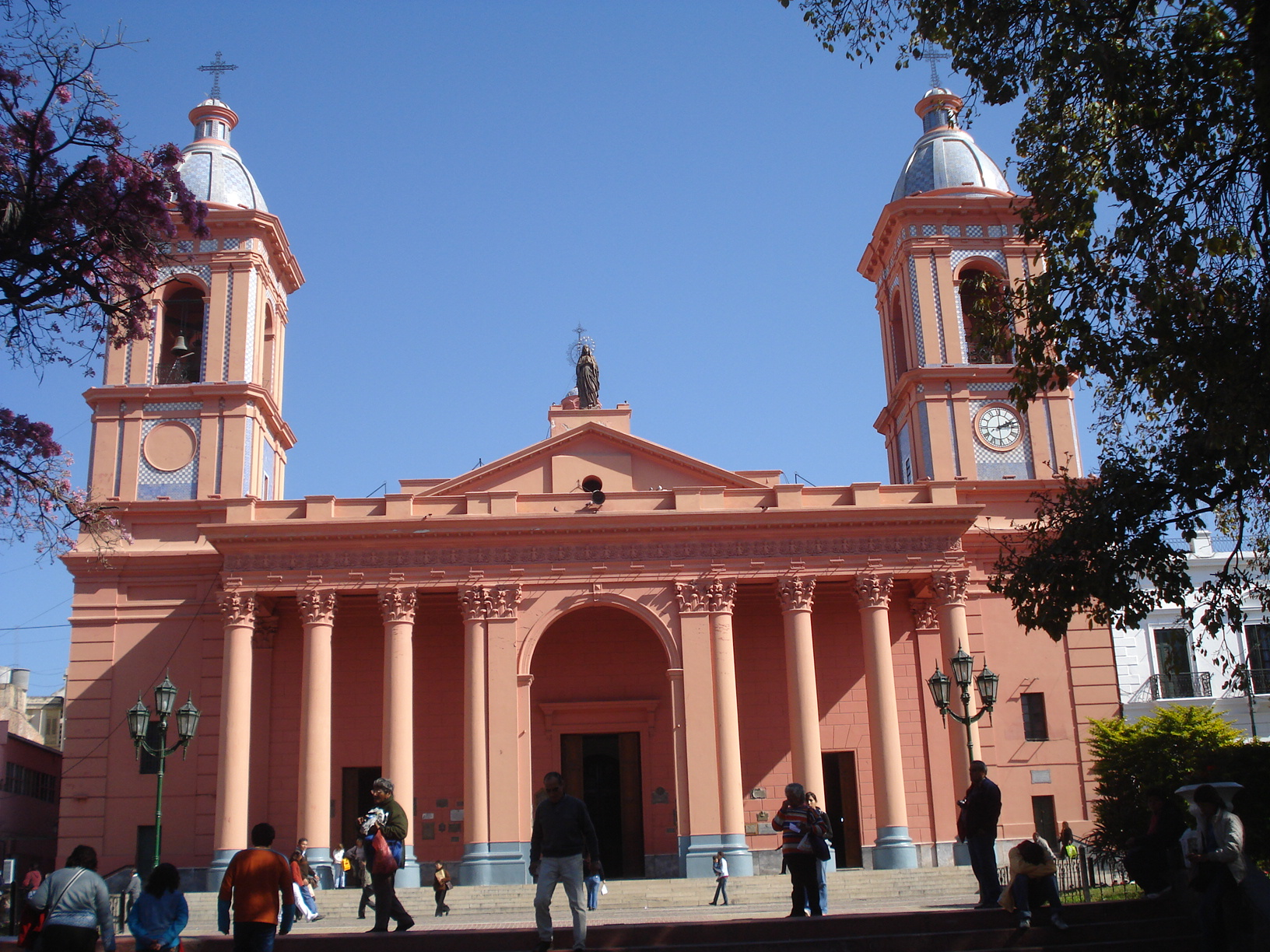
- Cathedral Basilica of Our Lady of the Valley

Location
- Country: Argentina
- Ecclesiastical province: Salta
- Metropolitan: Salta

Statistics
- Area: 68,765 km^{2} (26,550 sq mi)
- Population: Total; Catholics: (as of 2006); 330,092; 323,000 (97.9%)
- Parishes: 27

Information
- Denomination: Roman Catholic
- Rite: Roman Rite
- Established: 21 January 1910 (116 years ago)
- Cathedral: Cathedral Basilica of Our Lady of the Valley in San Fernando del Valle de Catamarca
- Patron saint: Our lady of the Valley

Current leadership
- Pope: Leo XIV
- Bishop: Luis Urbanč
- Metropolitan Archbishop: Mario Antonio Cargnello

Website
- Website of the Diocese

The Roman Catholic Diocese of Catamarca (Latin: Dioecesis Catamarcensis) is in Argentina and is a suffragan of the Archdiocese of Salta. As of December 2007, its bishop is Luis Urbanč

== History ==
On 21 January 1910, Saint Pius X established the Diocese of Catamarca from the Diocese of Tucumán. It lost territory to the Territorial Prelature of Cafayate when it was created in 1969,.

== Ordinaries ==
- Bernabé Piedrabuena (1910–1923), appointed Bishop of Tucumán
- Inocencio Dávila y Matos (1927–1930)
- Vicente Peira (1932–1934)
- Carlos Francisco Hanlon, C.P. (1934–1959)
- Adolfo Servando Tortolo (1960–1962), appointed Archbishop of Paraná
- Alfonso Pedro Torres Farías, O.P. (1962–1988)
- Elmer Osmar Ramón Miani (1989–2007)
- Luis Urbanč (since 2007)

== Territorial losses ==
Year	Along with	To form
1969	Archdiocese of Salta	Territorial Prelature of Cafayate
