= Diocese of Orán =

Catholic ecclesiastical territory

Diocese of Orán Dioecesis Novoraniensis Diócesis de Orán

Catholic

Location
- Country: Argentina
- Ecclesiastical province: Salta
- Metropolitan: Salta

Statistics
- Area: 55,000 km^{2} (21,000 sq mi)
- Population: Total; Catholics: (as of 2004); 321,100; 280,000 (87.2%)
- Parishes: 19

Information
- Denomination: Roman Catholic
- Rite: Roman Rite
- Established: 10 April 1961 (65 years ago)
- Cathedral: Cathedral of St Raymond Nonnatus in Orán, Salta
- Patron saint: St Raymond Nonnatus; Our Lady of Mount Carmel

Current leadership
- Pope: Leo XIV
- Bishop: Luis Antonio Scozzina
- Metropolitan Archbishop: Mario Antonio Cargnello

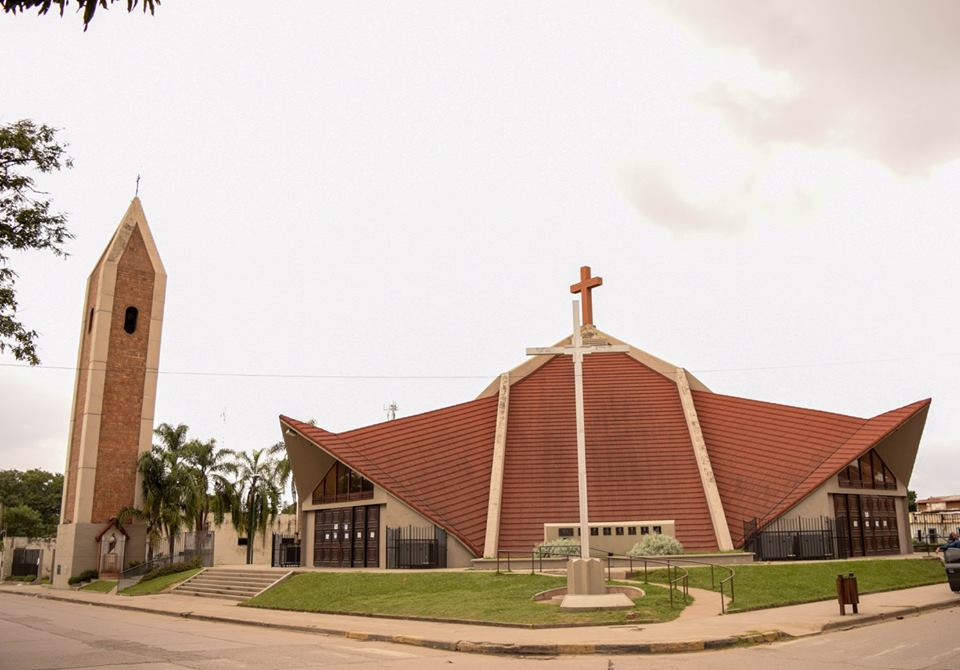
Catedral de la Nueva Oran

The Roman Catholic Diocese of Orán (Latin: Dioecesis Novoraniensis) is located in the city of San Ramón de la Nueva Orán, Argentina. It is a suffragan see to the Archdiocese of Salta.

== History ==
On 10 April 1961, Pope John XXIII established the Diocese of Orán from the Archdiocese of Salta.

=== Sex abuse and financial scandals ===
On 10 June 2019, former Bishop Gustavo Zanchetta was criminally charged with sexually abusing two seminarians. Zanchetta, who was one of Pope Francis's first appointments in his home country, was first accused of "strange behaviour" in 2015 when pornographic pictures, including naked selfies, were found on his phone. In August 2017, Pope Francis allowed Zanchetta to resign as Bishop of Orán, citing "health reasons," but then appointed him to serve as Assessor, or Councilor, to the Administration of the Patrimony of the Apostolic See. Despite this appointment, Zanchetta remained in Argentina when he was charged. He was barred from leaving the country, had to undergo a psychiatric evaluation, and faces between three and ten years in prison if convicted. A Vatican trial also began for Zanchetta on 28 May 2019. A local priest speaking on anonymity later told Crux Now on 13 August 2019 that the Diocese had "not one, not two, not three, but several" cases of sex abuse.

On 28 August 2019, it was announced that Zanchetta's travel ban was lifted and he returned to Rome. However he still remains suspended as Councilor to the Administration of the Patrimony of the Apostolic See and has appointed to take a different job in the Vatican.

On 7 November 2019, the main offices of the Diocese of Orán were raided as part of the ongoing investigation against Zanchetta. In addition to sex abuse charges, Zanchetta is also accused of committing acts of financial fraud and mismanagement by embezzling Diocese charity funds which were secretly not used for charitable causes, but instead were used for personal benefit. Zanchetta also secretly sold Church property to buyers as well. After this report surfaced it was reported that Zanchetta was still suspended by the Vatican. On 27 November 2019, Zanchetta returned voluntarily to Argentina and appeared in court earlier than the scheduled 28 November deadline. A judge once again allowed Zanchetta to return to the Vatican, but also required him to maintain residence at the Santa Marta Hotel.

On 4 March 2022, Bishop Emeritus Zanchetta was convicted of «aggravated continued sexual abuse», sentenced to four and a half years in prison and immediately arrested. Bishop Scozzina apologized to the victims and called for reconciliation «to heal the wounds caused by gestures and attitudes of authoritarianism and abuse of power».

== Ordinaries ==
- Francisco Felipe de la Cruz Muguerza, O.F.M. † (12 June 1961 – 2 May 1969) Died
- Manuel Guirao † (31 October 1970 – 20 January 1981) Appointed, Bishop of Santiago del Estero
- Gerardo Eusebio Sueldo † (30 April 1982 – 15 May 1993) Appointed, Coadjutor Bishop of Santiago del Estero
- Mario Antonio Cargnello (7 April 1994 – 24 June 1998) Appointed, Coadjutor Archbishop of Salta
- Jorge Rubén Lugones, S.J. (2 June 1999 – 14 October 2008) Appointed, Bishop of Lomas de Zamora
- Marcelo Daniel Colombo (8 May 2009 – 8 July 2013)
- Gustavo Óscar Zanchetta (23 July 2013 – 1 August 2017) Resigned.
- Luis Antonio Scozzina O.F.M. (6 April 2018 - )
