= Salta Cathedral =

Roman Catholic cathedral in Salta, Argentina

Coordinates: 24°47′18″S 65°24′37″W

Cathedral of Salta Catedral Basílica de Salta y Santuario del Señor y La Virgen del Milagro
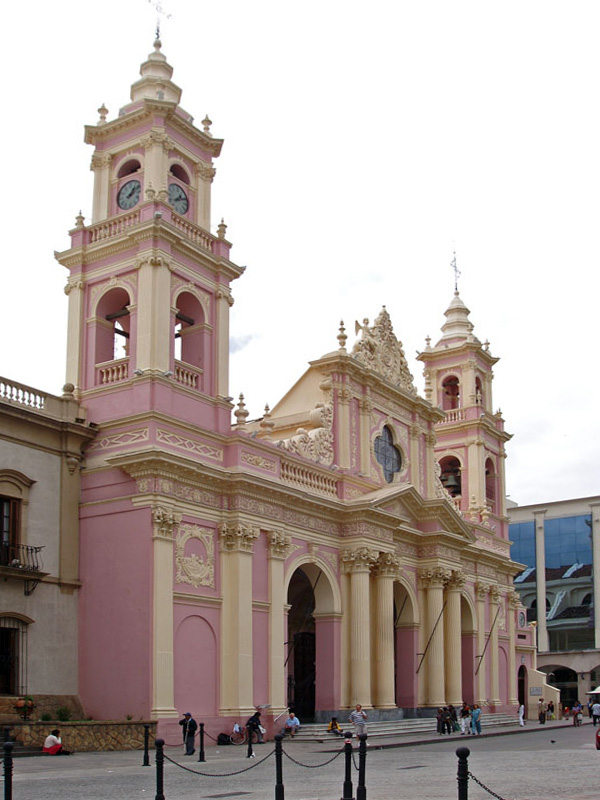
- Salta Cathedral

Religion
- Affiliation: Roman Catholic Church
- Province: Archdiocese of Salta
- Ecclesiastical or organisational status: Cathedral
- Status: Active

Location
- Location: Salta, Argentina
- Interactive map of Cathedral of Salta; Catedral Basílica de Salta y Santuario del Señor y La Virgen del Milagro

Architecture
- Type: Church
- Style: Baroque
- Completed: 19th century

Salta Cathedral (Spanish: Catedral Basílica de Salta, Catedral de Salta) is a Roman Catholic cathedral in Salta, Argentina. The church serves as the seat and the metropolitan cathedral of the Archbishop of Salta. The cathedral is dedicated to Jesus Christ as the “Lord of Miracles” and the Blessed Virgin Mary as the “Our Lady of the Miraculous Rosary”.

Pope Leo XIII granted a decree of Pontifical coronation for both of its enshrined images on 23 July 1899 via the Bishop Ordinary of Salta, Monsignor Matías Linares y Sanzetenea. The same bishop executed the rite of public coronation on 13 September 1902.

The shrine was inaugurated to the public on 20 October 1918 and finally declared a national monument No. #95687 by the Government of Argentina on 14 June 1941.

== History ==
A new cathedral was built in 1856, after an earthquake destroyed the old building. Services began in 1858 under the patronage of Archbishop José Eusebio Colombres. Felipe Bertrés was the architect. The project was completed in 1882.

== Photogallery ==
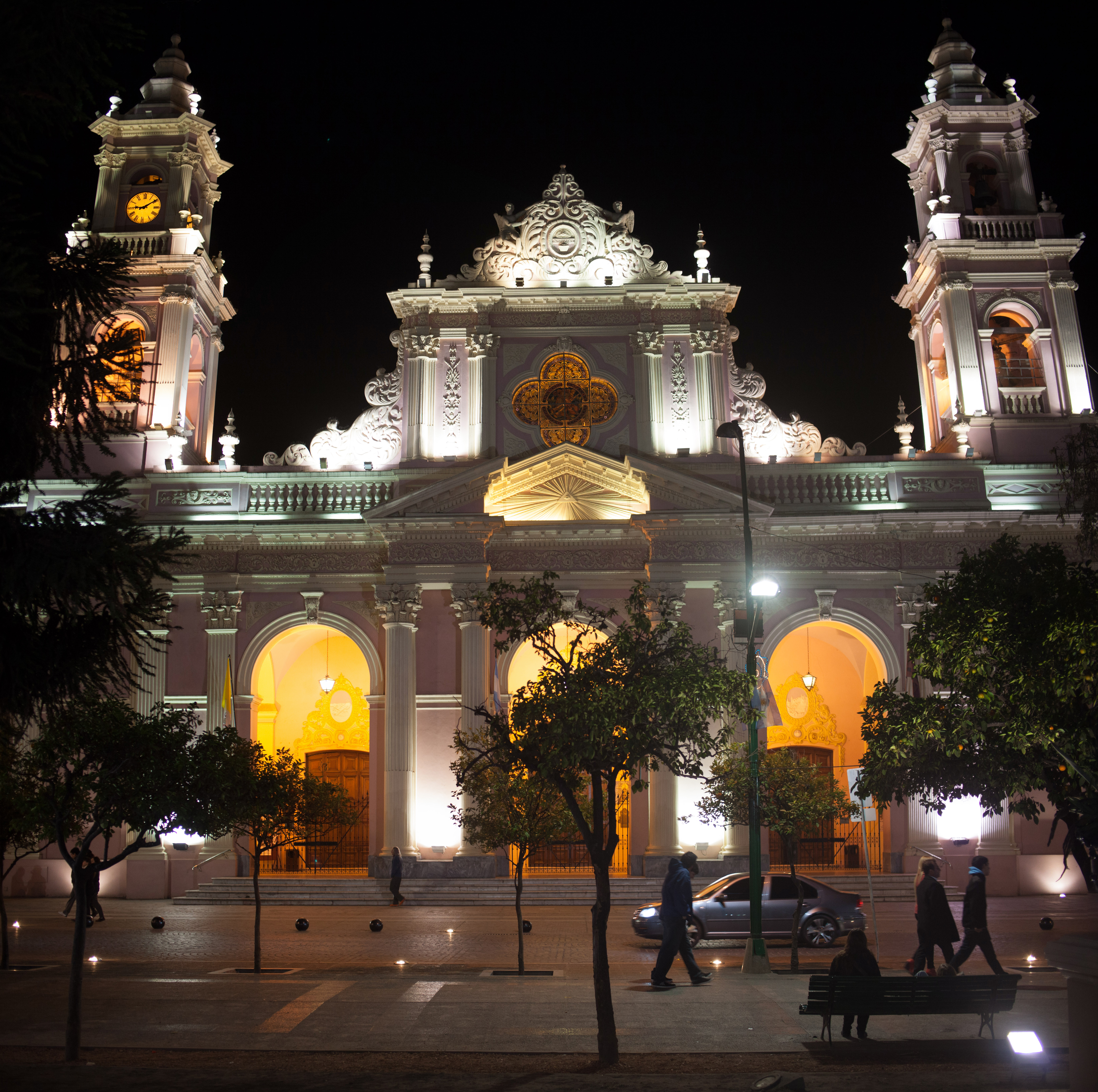
The cathedral by night

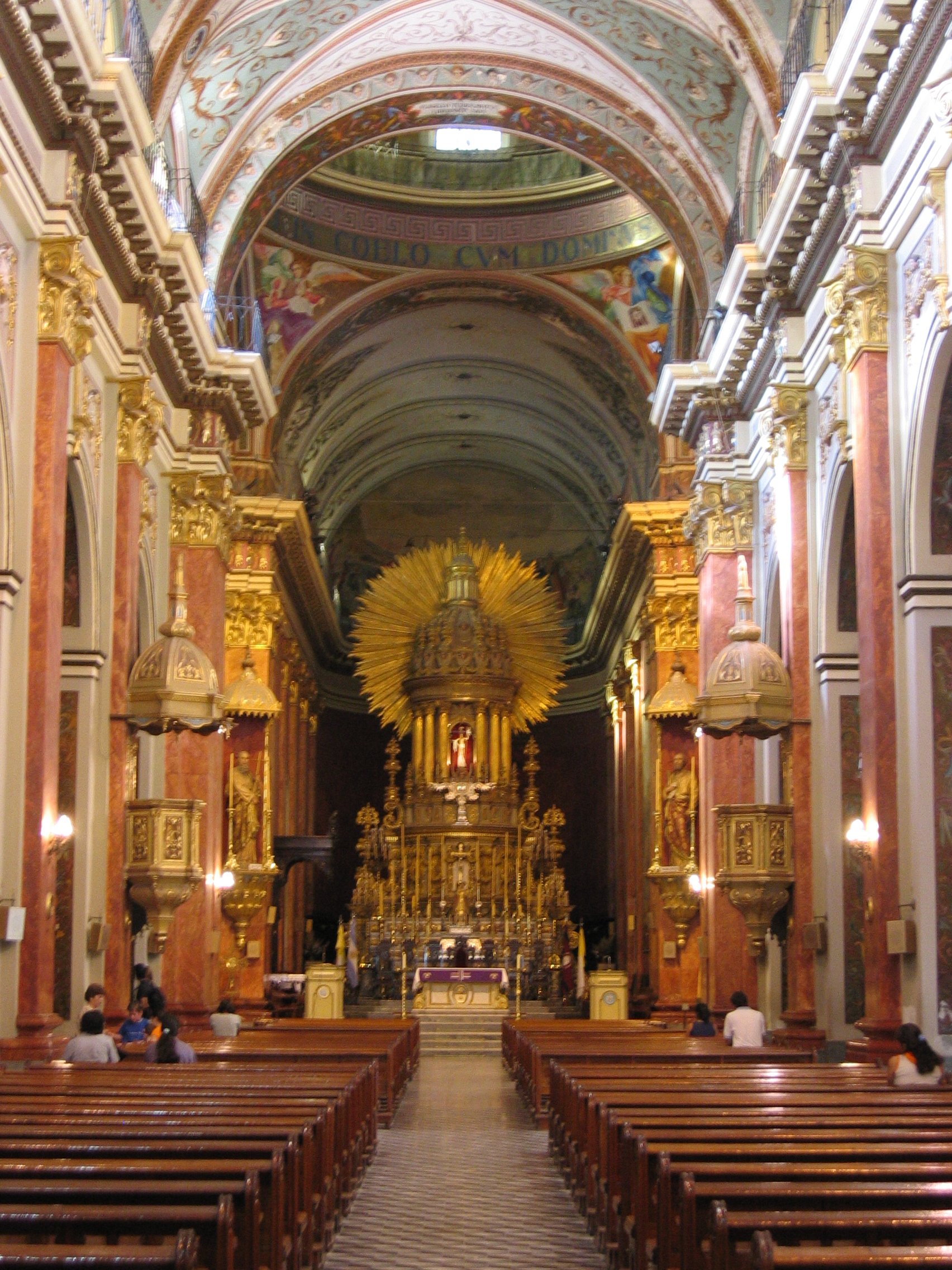
Interior

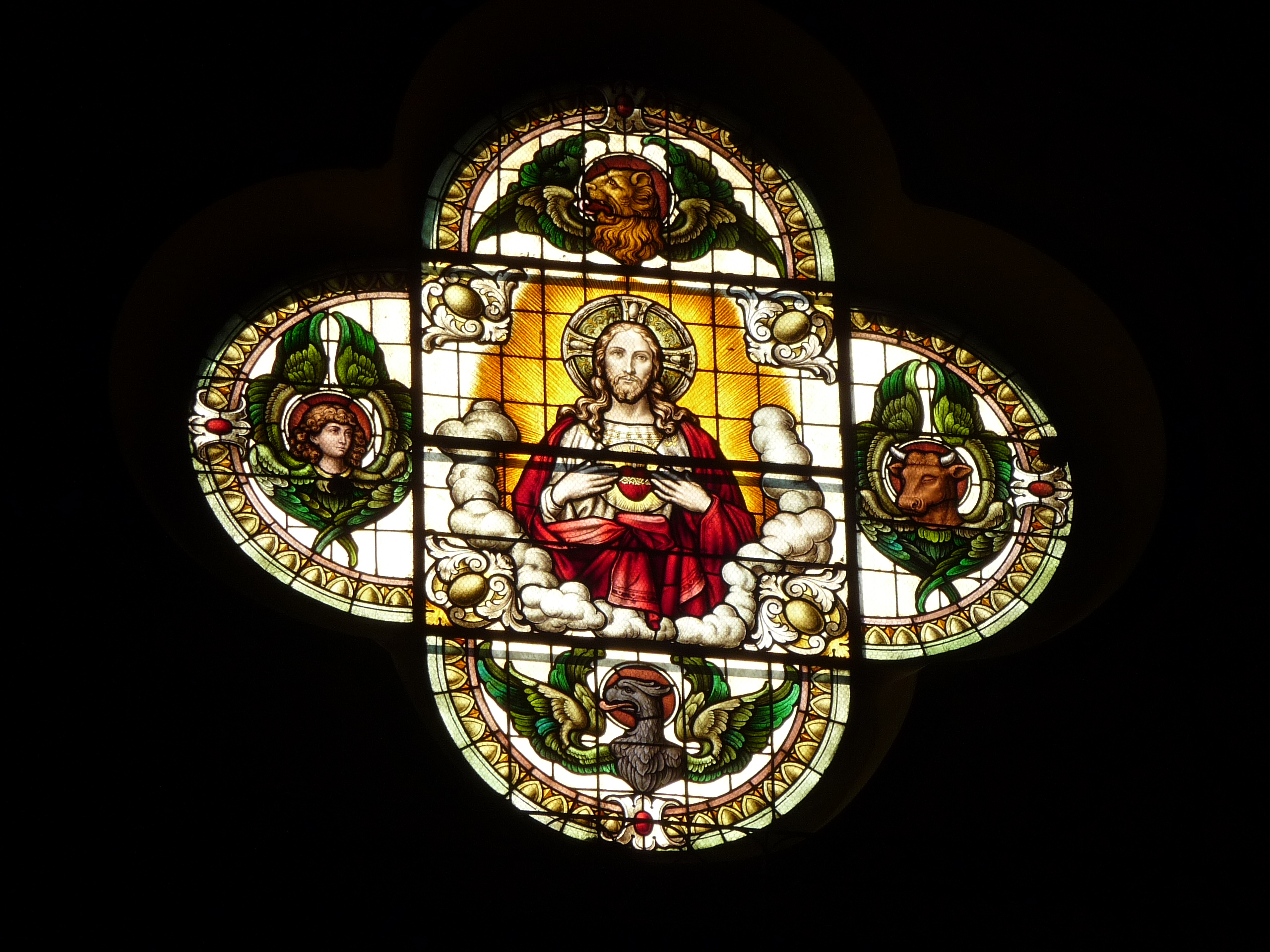
Interior

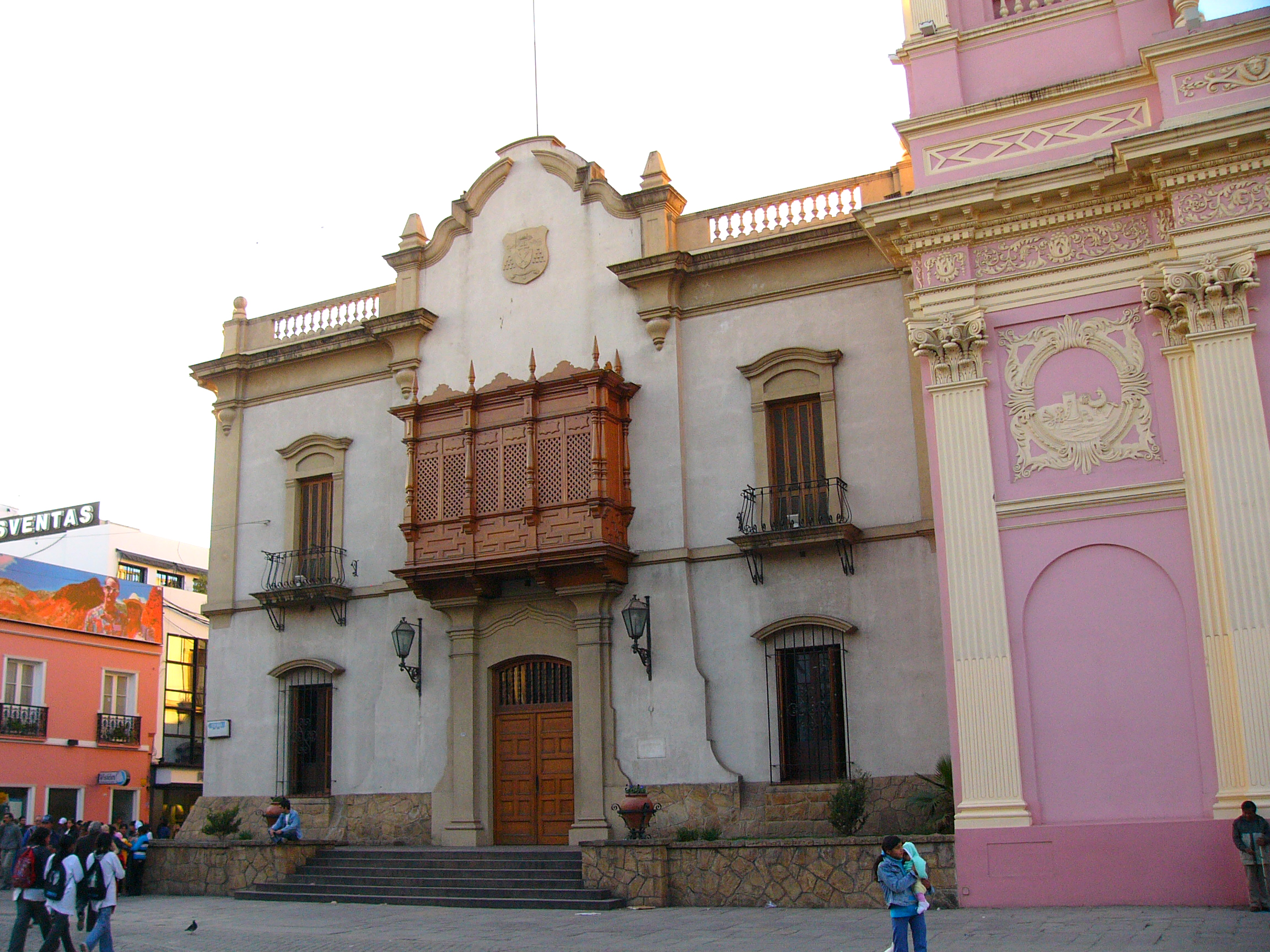
Archbishop palace, near the cathedral

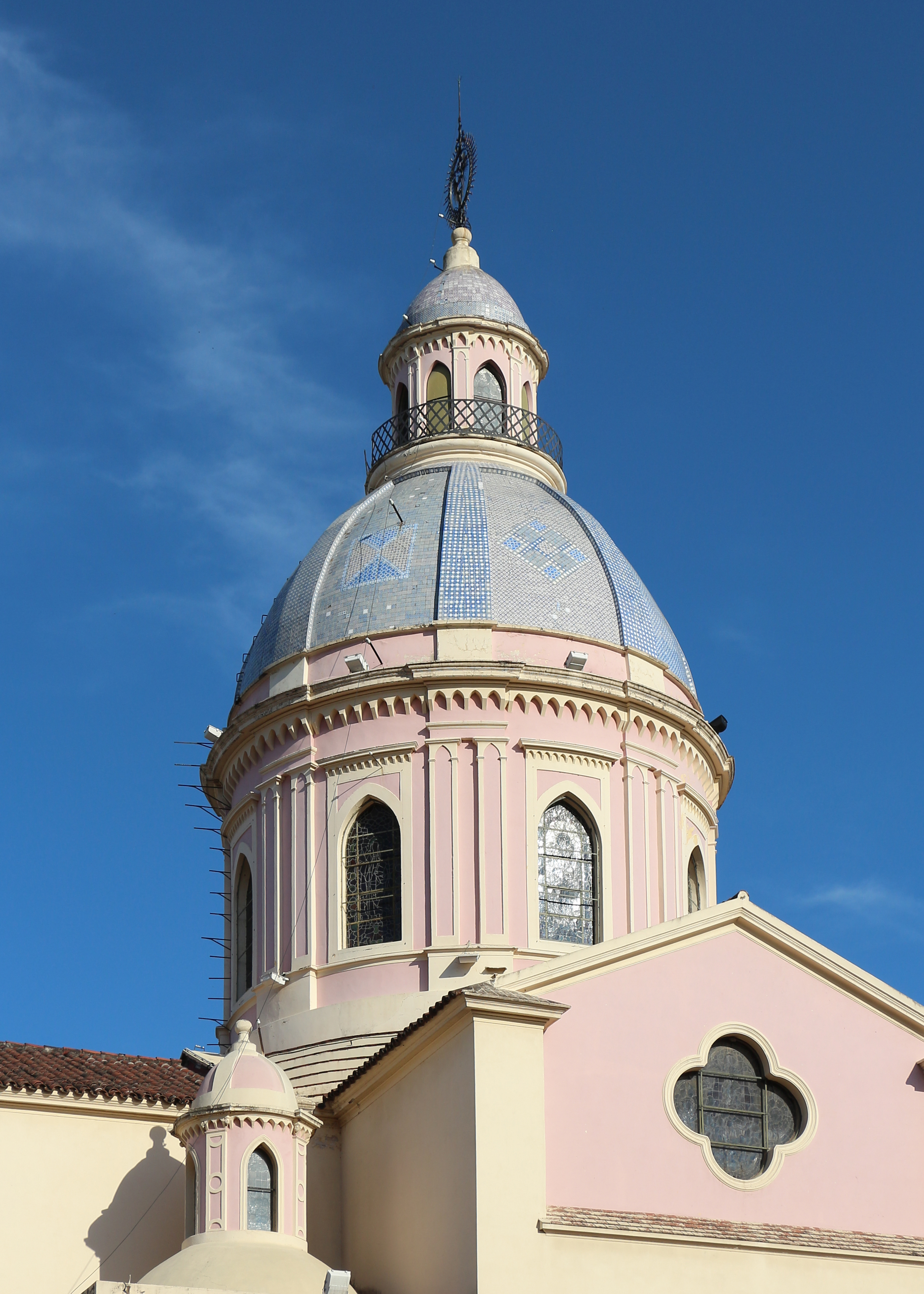
Dome of the cathedral

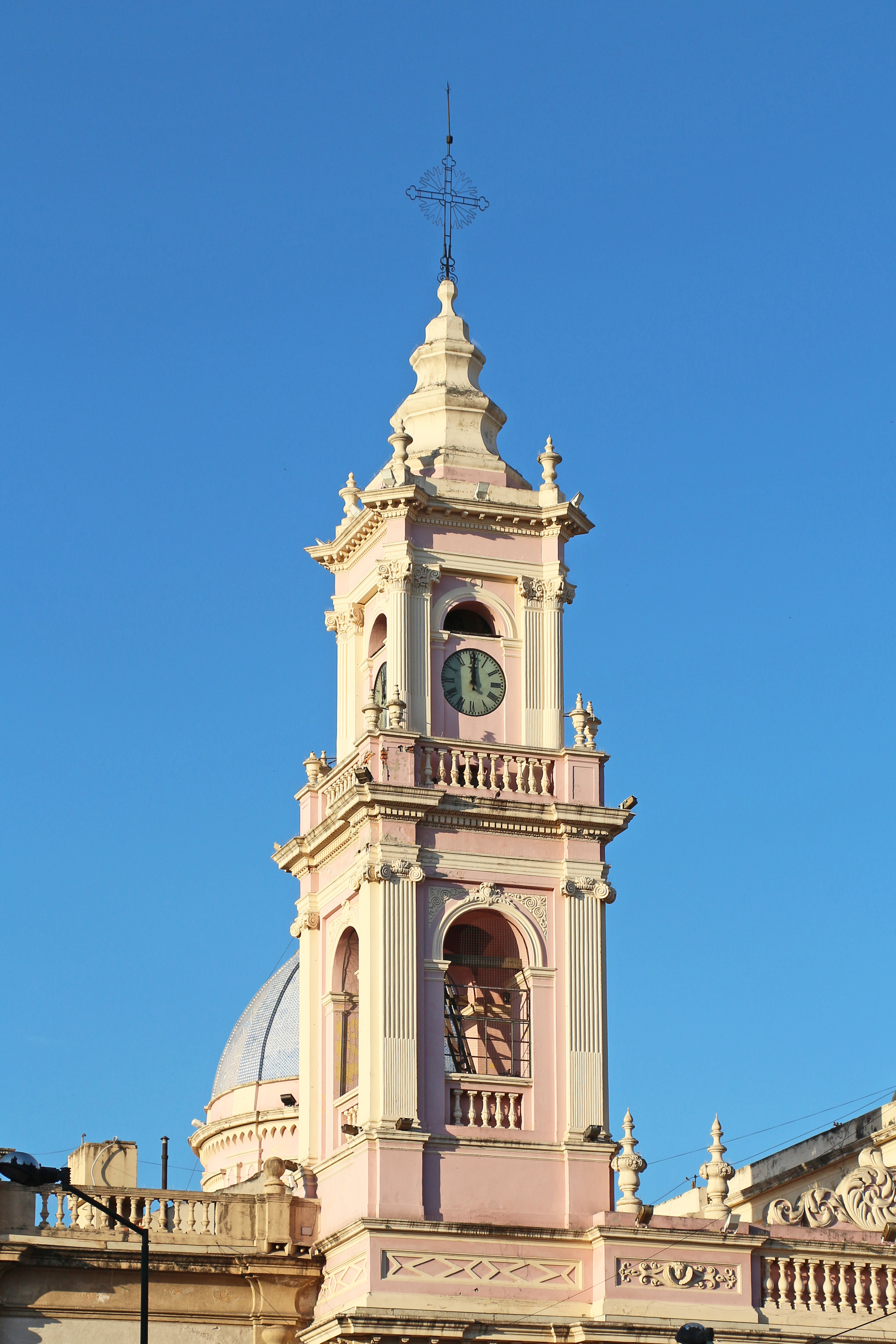
Left bell tower of the cathedral

== Sources ==
- Website of the Archdiocese of Salta Cathedral (in Spanish)
