= Diocese of Villa de la Concepción del Río Cuarto =

Catholic ecclesiastical territory

Diocese of Villa de la Concepción del Río Cuarto Dioecesis Rivi Quarti Immaculatae Conceptionis Diócesis de Villa de la Concepción del Río Cuarto

Catholic
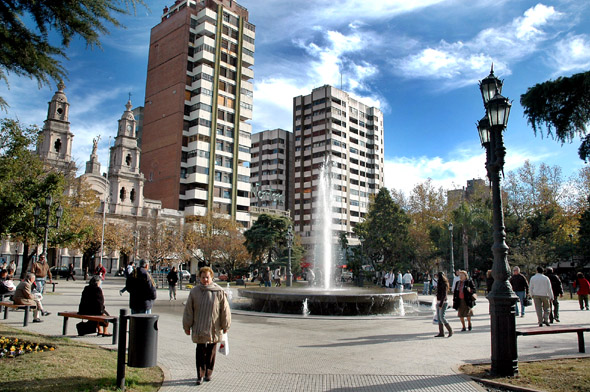

Location
- Country: Argentina
- Ecclesiastical province: Córdoba
- Metropolitan: Córdoba

Statistics
- Area: 58,519 km^{2} (22,594 sq mi)
- Population: Total; Catholics: (as of 2010); 453,000; 427,000 (94.3%)
- Parishes: 52

Information
- Denomination: Roman Catholic
- Rite: Roman Rite
- Established: 20 April 1934 (92 years ago)
- Cathedral: Cathedral of the Immaculate Conception in Río Cuarto, Córdoba

Current leadership
- Pope: Leo XIV
- Bishop: Adolfo Armando Uriona
- Metropolitan Archbishop: Carlos José Ñáñez

The Roman Catholic Diocese of Villa de la Concepción del Río Cuarto (Latin: Dioecesis Rivi Quarti Immaculatae Conceptionis) is located in the village of Concepción in the city of Río Cuarto, in the province of Córdoba, Argentina.

== History ==
On 20 April 1934, Pope Pius XI established the Diocese of Río Cuarto from the Diocese of Córdoba. Its name was changed to the Diocese of Villa de la Concepción del Río Cuarto on 12 July 1995.

== Bishops ==
=== Ordinaries ===
- Leopoldo Buteler (1934–1961)
- Moisés Julio Blanchoud (1962–1984), appointed Archbishop of Salta
- Adolfo Roque Esteban Arana (1984–1992)
- Ramón Artemio Staffolani (1992–2006)
- Eduardo Eliseo Martín (2006–2014), appointed Archbishop of Rosario
- Adolfo Armando Uriona (2014-

=== Coadjutor bishop ===
- Ramón Artemio Staffolani (1990-1992)

=== Auxiliary bishop ===
- Moisés Julio Blanchoud (1960–1982), appointed Bishop here

=== Other priests of this diocese who became bishops ===
- Carlos José Tissera, appointed Bishop of San Francisco in 2004
- Victor Manuel Fernández, appointed titular Archbishop in 2013
- Hugo Ricardo Araya, appointed Bishop of Cruz del Eje in 2017
