= Bernabé Piedrabuena (bishop) =

Argentine bishop (1863–1942)

- Titular Bishop of Callinico
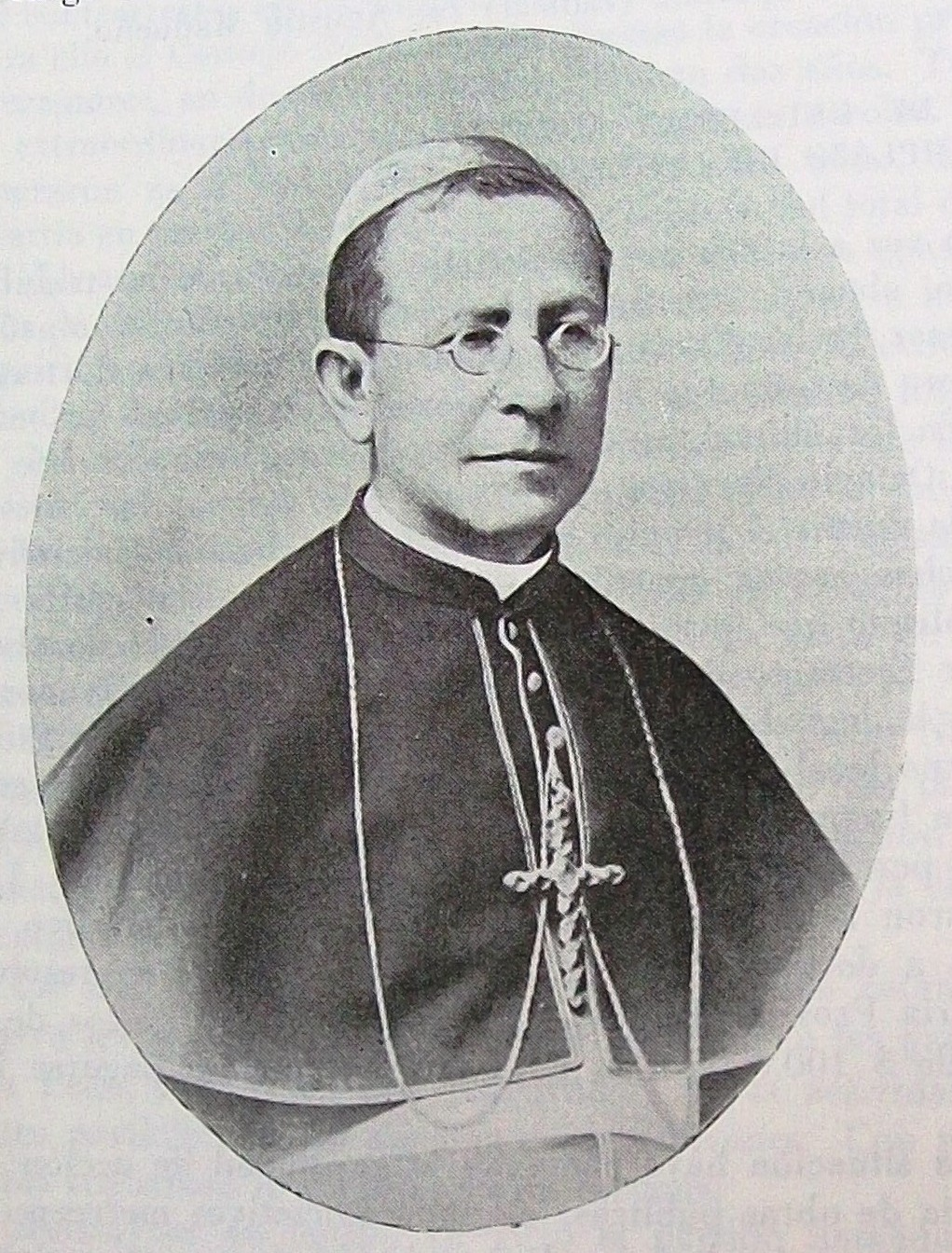
- A photo of Bernabé Piedrabuena
- Church: Catholic Church
- Diocese: Catamarca
- In office: 17 December 1928 – 11 June 1942
- Predecessor: Joseph Gionali
- Successor: Tomás Aspe
- Previous posts: Bishop of Tucumán (1923-1928); Bishop of Catamarca (1910-1923); Titular Bishop of Cestrus (1907-1910); Auxiliary Bishop of Tucumán (1907-1910))

Orders
- Ordination: 31 May 1886
- Consecration: 31 May 1908 by Pablo Padilla y Bárcena

Personal details
- Born: 10 October 1863 San Miguel de Tucumán, Argentina
- Died: 11 June 1942 (aged 78)

Bernabé Piedrabuena (November 10, 1863 – June 11, 1942) was an Argentine bishop. Underneath his bishopric, the Diocese of Catamarca was separated from the Archdiocese of Tucumán on 21 January 1910.

The son of Bernabé Piedrabuena and Merćedes Mariño, Bernabé was educated at the seminary at the Archdiocese of Salta, beginning at age 11. Following his ordination in 1886, he was appointed a professor at the seminary; he would later become rector.
