= Enrique José Mühn =

Argentine clergyman and bishop

Enrique José Mühn (born 1897 in San Jerónimo Department) was an Argentine clergyman and bishop for the Roman Catholic Diocese of Jujuy. He was ordained in 1930. He was appointed bishop in 1934. He died in 1966.
