= Pedro Reginaldo Lira =

- Auxiliary Bishop Archdiocese of Salta (Emeritus)
- Church: Roman Catholic Church
- See: Archdiocese of Salta
- In office: 1958 - 1961/ 1967 - 1978
- Previous post(s): Priest

Orders
- Ordination: September 21, 1938

Personal details
- Born: September 7, 1915; Salta, Argentina
- Died: December 11, 2012 (aged 97)

Pedro Reginaldo Lira, (September 7, 1915 – December 11, 2012) was an Argentine Bishop of the Roman Catholic Church.

== Biography ==
Lira was born in Salta, Argentina in 1915 and was ordained a bishop on September 21, 1938. He was appointed Auxiliary Bishop of the Archdiocese of Salta and Titular Bishop of Tenedus on July 16, 1958, and ordained bishop on September 7, 1958 (his 43rd Birthday). Lira was then appointed bishop of the Diocese of San Francisco in Argentina on June 12, 1961. He resigned from this post on June 22, 1965, and was then appointed Titular bishop of Castellum in Mauretania. He was again appointed to Auxiliary Bishop of the Archdiocese of Salta in 1967 and resigned from that position on May 12, 1978, along with the Titular Bishop of Castellum in Mauretania.

The Catholic University of Salta and the Horco Huasi Institute published a book in memory of him in 2016.
