= Marcelino Palentini =

Marcelino Palentini S.C.I.
- Bishop of Jujuy
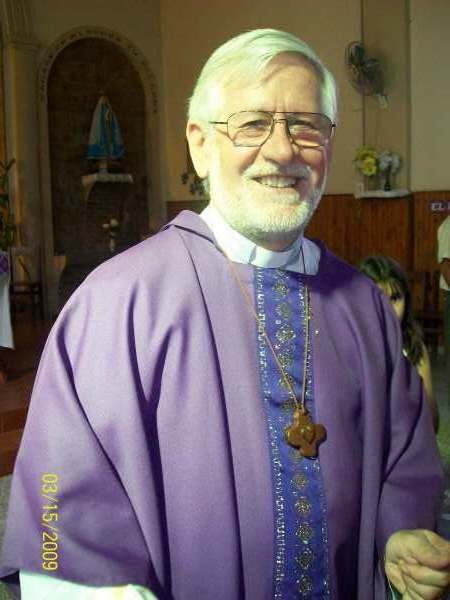
- Church: Catholic Church
- Diocese: Diocese of Jujuy
- In office: 11 July 1995 – 18 September 2011
- Predecessor: Raúl Arsenio Casado
- Successor: César Daniel Fernández

Orders
- Ordination: 27 June 1970
- Consecration: 7 October 1995 by Juan José Iriarte

Personal details
- Born: 17 September 1943 Caldogno, Province of Vicenza, Italian Social Republic
- Died: 18 September 2011 (aged 68)

Marcelino Palentini (17 September 1943 – 18 September 2011) was the Roman Catholic bishop of the Roman Catholic Diocese of Jujuy, Argentina.

Born in Italy, Palentini was ordained to the priesthood in 1975. In 1995, he was named bishop served until his death on 17 September 2011.
