= Diocese of Quilmes =

Catholic ecclesiastical territory

Coordinates: 34°44′24.33″S 58°17′38.87″W

Diocese of Quilmes Dioecesis Quilmensis Diócesis de Quilmes

Catholic

Location
- Country: Argentina
- Ecclesiastical province: Buenos Aires
- Metropolitan: Buenos Aires

Statistics
- Area: 503 km^{2} (194 sq mi)
- Population: Total; Catholics: (as of 2010); 1,198,000; 1,028,000 (85.8%)
- Parishes: 80

Information
- Denomination: Roman Catholic
- Rite: Roman Rite
- Established: 19 June 1976 (50 years ago)
- Cathedral: Cathedral of the Immaculate Conception in Quilmes

Current leadership
- Pope: Leo XIV
- Bishop: Carlos José Tissera
- Metropolitan Archbishop: Mario Aurelio Poli
- Bishops emeritus: Luis Teodorico Stöckler

Map
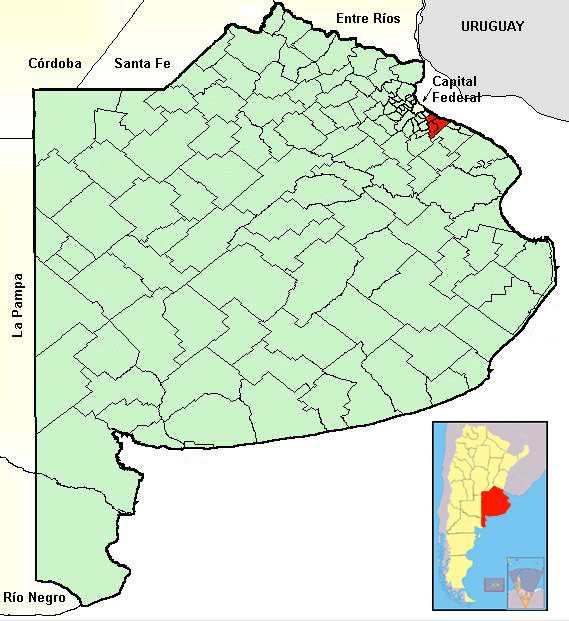

Website
- Website of the Diocese

The Roman Catholic Diocese of Quilmes is located in the city of Quilmes, capital of Quilmes Partido, in the province of Buenos Aires in Argentina. It was established by Pope Paul VI on 19 June 1976.

== Bishops ==
=== Ordinaries ===
- Jorge Novak, S.V.D. (1976–2001)
- Luis Teodorico Stöckler (2002–2011)
- Carlos José Tissera (2011–present)

=== Coadjutor bishop ===
- Gerardo Tomás Farrell (1997-2000), did not succeed to see

=== Auxiliary bishop ===
- Marcelo Julián Margni (2017-2021)

== Ministries ==
- Social Ministry: Pablo Reynoso
- Education Ministry: Ana González
- Peace and Justice Ministry: Presbyter Ignacio Blanco
- Healthcare Ministry: Prebyster Adrián Fabio Bergallo
- Addictions Ministry: Dario Ojeda
- Tourism and Immigration Ministry: Bishop Emeritus Juan Carlos Romanín
- Prison Ministry: Presbyter Rubén Infantino
- Human trafficking Ministry: Presbyter Ignacio Blanco
