= Catholic Church in Argentina =

- Spanish: Iglesia católica en Argentina; Latin: Ecclesia Catholica in Argentina
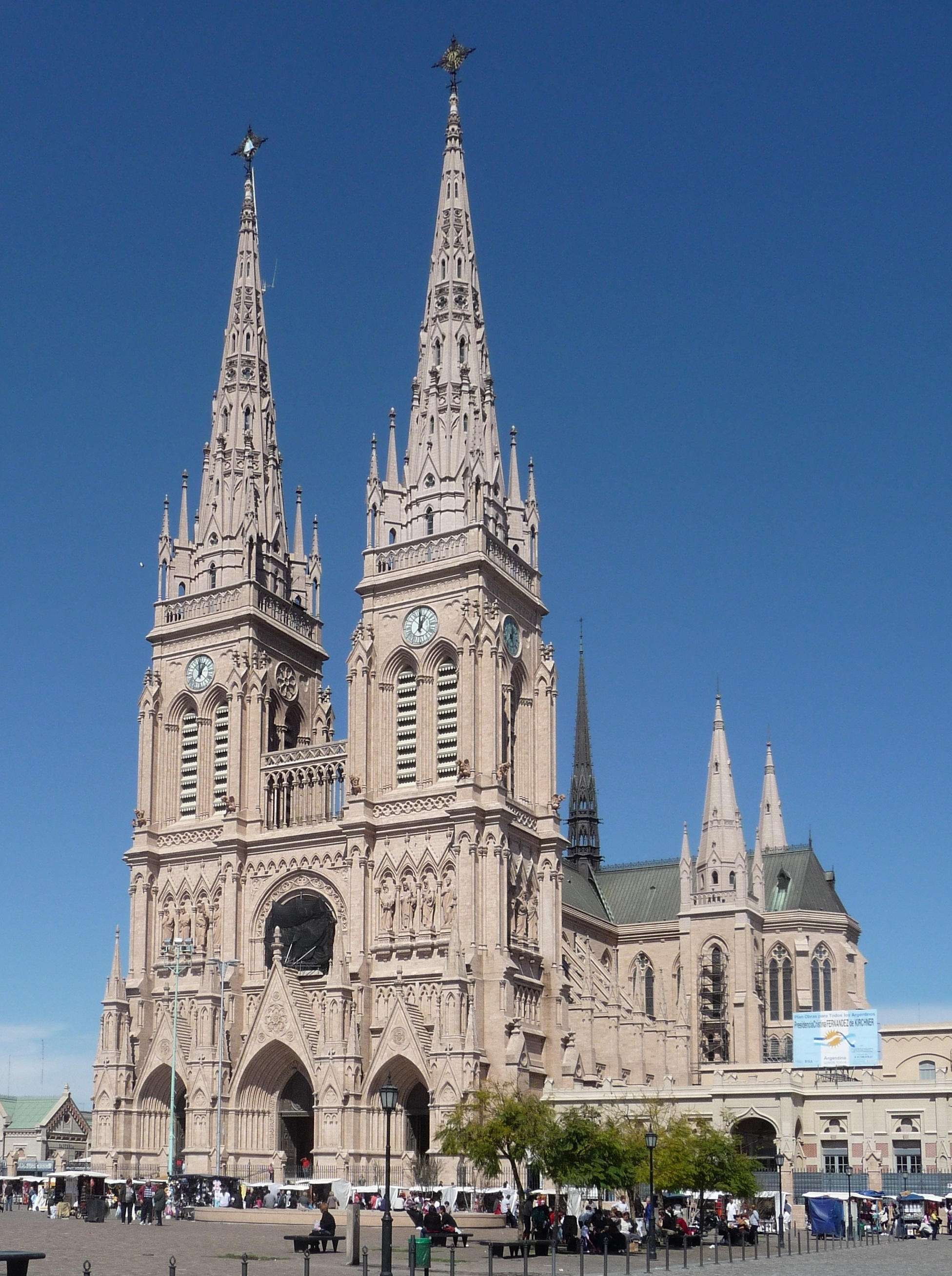
- Basilica of Our Lady of Luján
- Type: National polity
- Classification: Catholic
- Orientation: Latin
- Scripture: Bible
- Theology: Catholic theology
- Polity: Episcopal
- Governance: CEA
- Pope: Leo XIV
- Primate: Vicente Bokalic Iglic
- Region: Argentina
- Language: Spanish, Latin
- Origin: 17th century Colonial Argentina, Spanish Empire
- Members: 67.8% of Argentina's population
- Official website: CEA

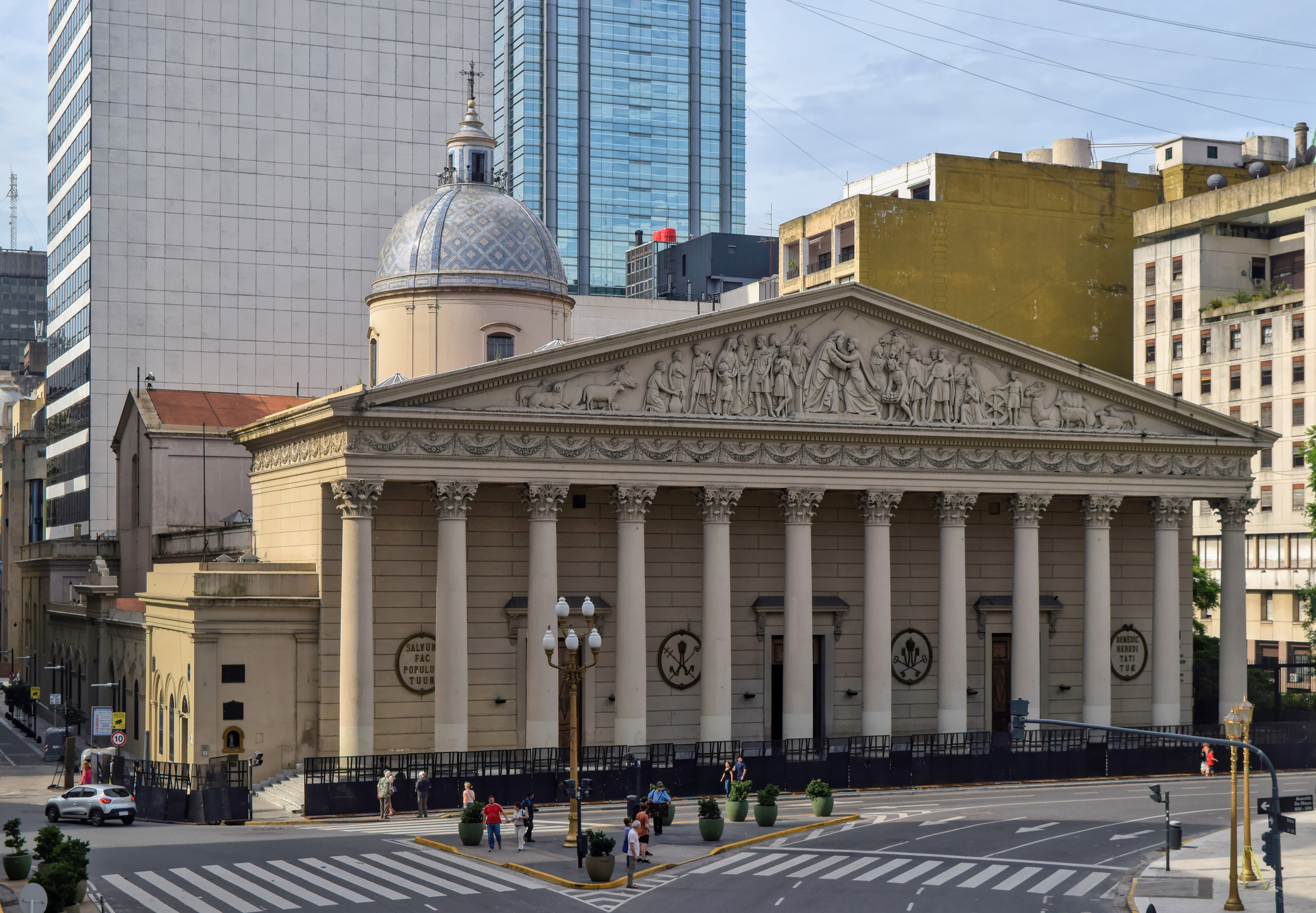
The Metropolitan Cathedral of the Most Holy Trinity in Buenos Aires.

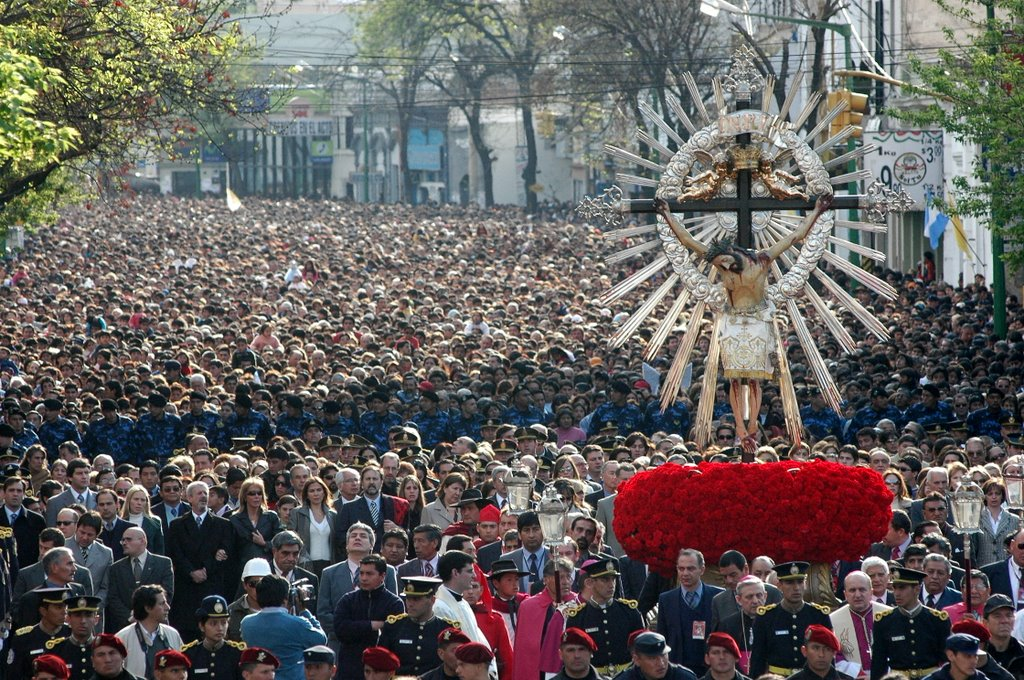
Miracle procession in Salta City.

The Argentine Catholic Church, or Catholic Church in Argentina, is part of the worldwide Catholic Church, under the spiritual leadership of the Pope, the Curia in Rome, and the Argentine Episcopal Conference.

According to the CIA World Factbook (July 2014), 92% of the country are nominally Catholic, but less than 20% practice their faith regularly (i.e., attend weekly Mass). Later studies in 2019 suggest that between 62.9% and 63.3% of Argentinians are Catholic. No study has yet determined whether Catholics with higher levels of traditional religious observance are more likely than those with lower levels to participate in any cultural Catholic activities such as participating in online conversations about Catholicism's customs, beliefs, etc., sharing Catholic holidays with family, or engaging in political and social activism as an expression of Catholicism. In 2020, such a study was made of American Jews, comparing and contrasting nominally Jewish adherents with those who practice their faith weekly.

Today, the church in Argentina is divided into administrative territorial units called dioceses and archdioceses. Buenos Aires, for example, is a metropolitan archdiocese owing to its size and historical significance as the capital of the nation.

An archbishop of Buenos Aires, Cardinal Jorge Bergoglio (later Pope Francis), SJ, was elected as Pope on 13 March 2013 in the 2013 papal conclave. Buenos Aires Metropolitan Cathedral, the seat of the archbishop, also houses the remains of General José de San Martín in a mausoleum.

There are eight Catholic universities in Argentina: Pontifical Catholic University of Argentina (Buenos Aires), the Universidad Católica de Córdoba, the Universidad Católica de La Plata, the Universidad Católica de Salta, the Universidad Católica de Santa Fe, the Universidad Católica de Cuyo, the Universidad Católica de las Misiones, and the Catholic University of Santiago del Estero.

== History ==
=== Colonial Era and Independence ===
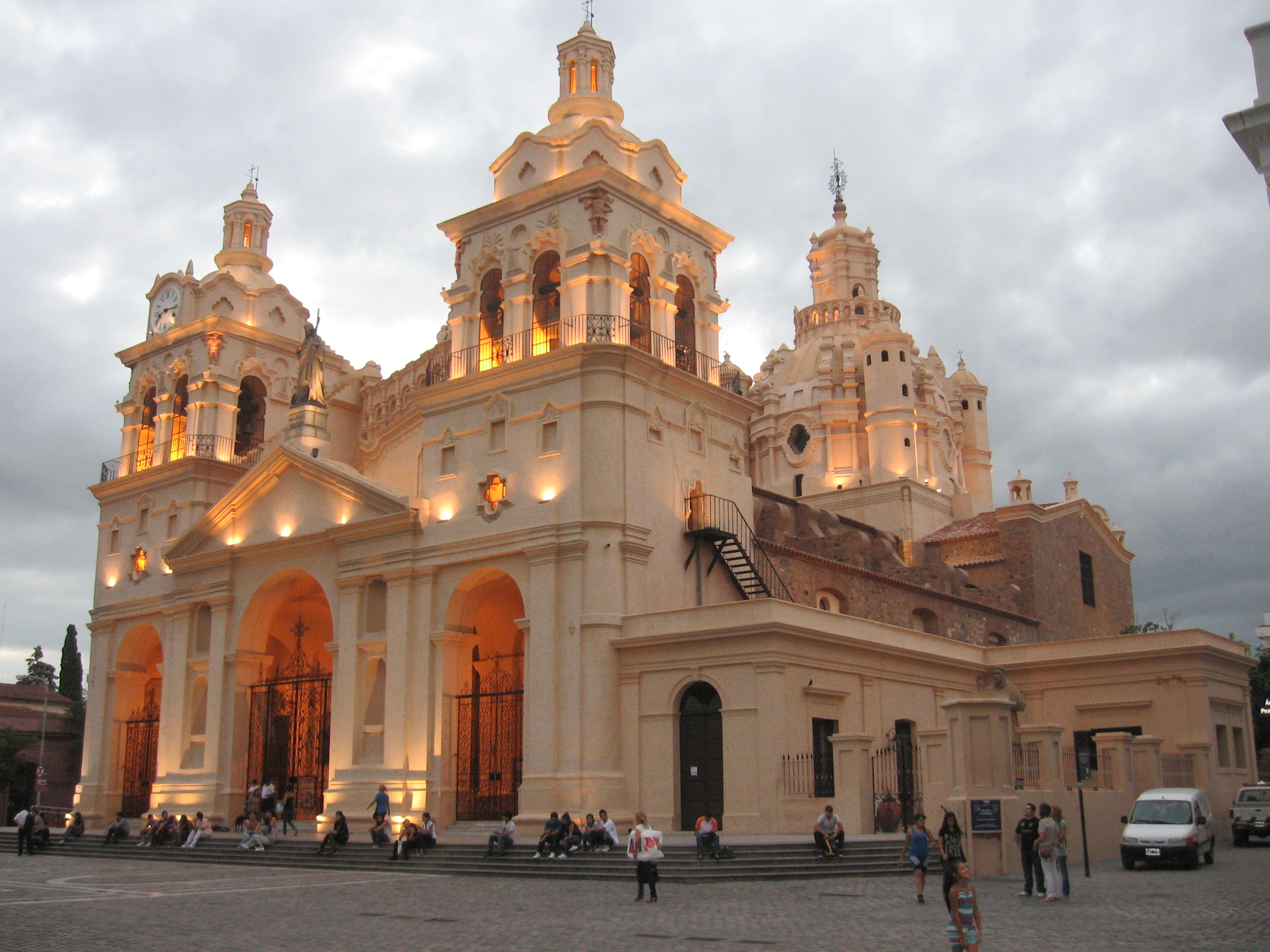
The Cathedral of Córdoba, founded in 1582 by the Spanish crown.

During the Spanish colonial period, the Catholic Church became the main provider of Christian presence and religious social services in the different Spanish viceroyalties in South America, including the territory that would later become the current Argentine Republic.

After the May Revolution in 1810 first, and then with the independence of Spain in 1816, there were disagreements within the national ruling elite about the degree of influence of the church in the country. Without wanting to offend Spain, the papacy condemned the revolutions sweeping South America in time and creating a contentious relationship with the budding Argentina Nation that will finally be resolved in 1966 with the concordat between the Argentine Republic and the Holy See.

=== Ecclesiastical reform of Rivadavia ===
Between 1820 and 1824, Martín Rodríguez governed, whose minister Bernardino Rivadavia promoted an ecclesiastical reform by modernizing a sector of society that had not changed since the time before the May Revolution. This reform included the suppression of tithes, the transfer to the State of some of the assets of the religious orders, such as those of the Sanctuary of Luján, of the Brotherhood of Charity, of the Hospital of Santa Catalina and others. ^{5} In opposition to the reform on March 19, 1823, the "Revolution of the Apostolics" broke out led by Gregorio García de Tagle in which illustrious citizens such as Domingo Achega, Mariano Benito Rolón, Ambrosio de Lezica (father) participated among others but failed after several hours of struggle.

The arbitrary and unilateral spoils of the Rivadavian administration together with the role of the Catholic Church in the genesis of Argentine nationality are the cause of the historical reparation that underlies the current support of Catholic worship in Argentina, regulated by Law 21.540 on the "Assignment to certain dignitaries belonging to the Roman Apostolic Catholic Cult." ^{6}

=== Relationship from the National Organization ===
In any case, it was established in the first Argentine Constitution, (unitary) promulgated in 1819 – in its article 1 -, in that of 1826 (also unitary) – in its article 3 – and then in the federal Constitution of 1853, in its article 2, – still in force with modifications -, which reserves a special place for the Catholic Church, the majority religion among the population.

During the wars for independence, the State confiscated many temple assets to support the armies. For this reason, after the fall of the tyranny of Juan Manuel de Rosas, in the battle of Caseros, when the Constitution of 1853 was drafted, this debt is recognized in the aforementioned article 2.

Church–state relations in the nineteenth century were characterized by a series of conflicts between the Argentine government and the church over the issues of compulsory secular education, civil marriage and the governmental appointment of religious authorities. Argentina and the Holy See broke diplomatic relations in the 1880s on these issues and it took almost 20 years to restore them.

=== First half of the 20th century ===
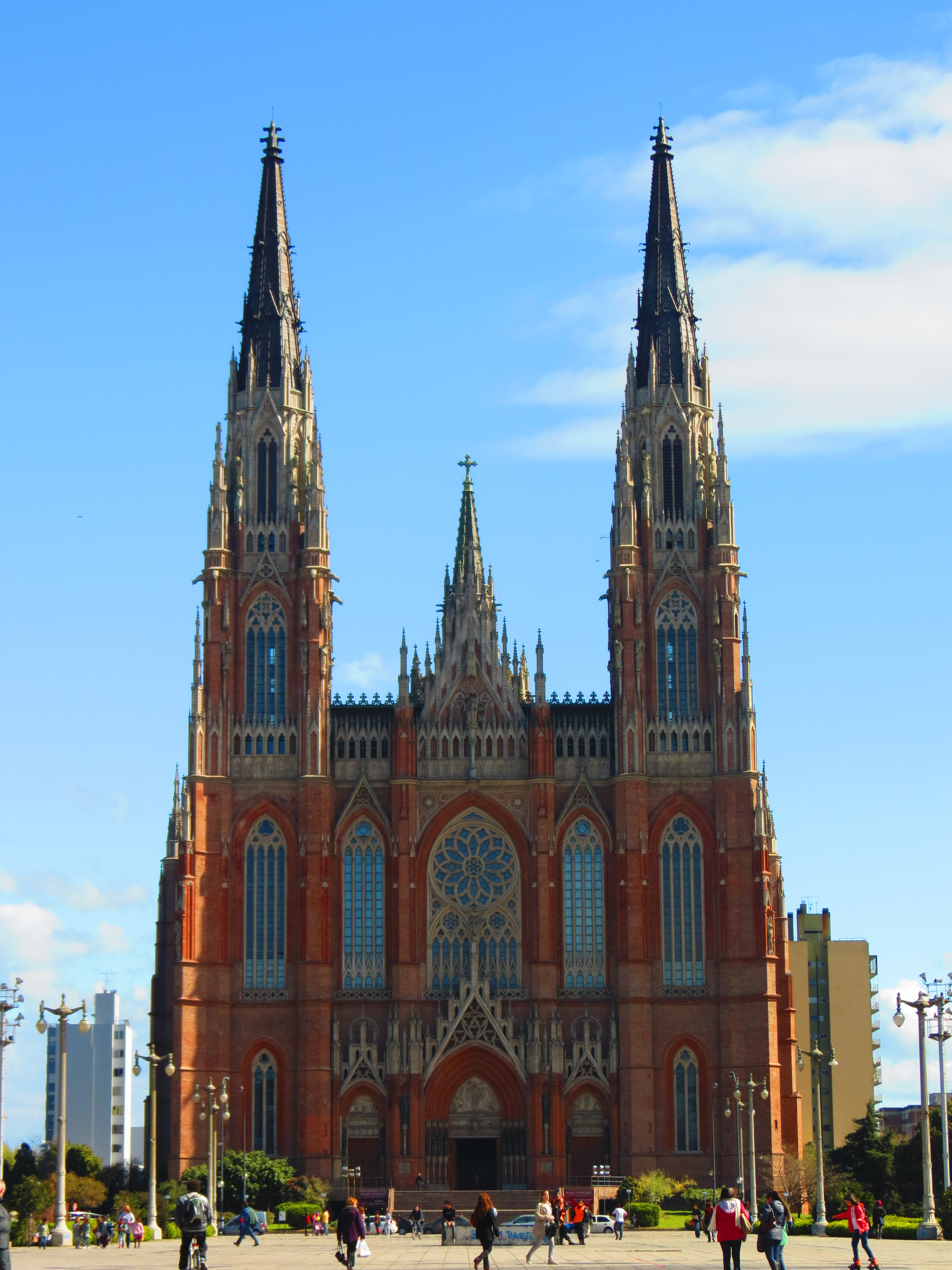
The Cathedral of La Plata.

At the beginning of the twentieth century, Buenos Aires was the second largest Catholic city in the world after Paris. The XXXII International Eucharistic Congress of 1934 was held in Buenos Aires, Argentina between October 9 and 14, 1934 with the presence of Eugenio Pacelli, future Pope Pius XII. It was the first to be held in Latin America and the third in the Americas after those held in Montreal and Chicago.

On the same day that the martyr Hector Valdivielso Sáez – the first Argentine saint – gave his life on October 9, the International Eucharistic Congress of 1934 began that marked a revival of Argentine Catholicism, a milestone from which a new life of the Church in Argentina, the dioceses increased, vocations grew, new parishes were built, and the laity became aware of their importance in the Church. Because of the magnitude of the crowds that attended public events, never before seen, it was the most important mass event in the country to date and, for some historians, the largest mobilization that has occurred in Argentina to date. ^{7}

Relations improved in the early twentieth century, with several conservative administrations working with the Holy See to lay the foundations for a mutually acceptable relationship, which involved, among other things, state permissiveness towards religious education in public schools.

=== Mid-20th Century ===
The government of the Infamous Decade, the subsequent dictatorship and the first eight years of the government of Juan Perón overthrew the continuity of the fluid relationship between the State and the Catholic Church. In 1954, President Perón broke off relations with the Catholic Church and began a confrontation with it. The Perón regime abolished non-working days for Catholic Holidays, legalized Divorce and Prostitution, prohibited religious displays in public places, and Creches were banned in Buenos Aires. On June 11, 1955, approximately 200 thousand people attended a Corpus Christi procession in Buenos Aires, despite it being illegal. The Peronist regime reacted by accusing the attendees of vandalism and burning the Flag of Argentina. The next day, Peronists attempted to set fire to Buenos Aires Metropolitan Cathedral, but were prevented by members of Catholic Action and the UNES. During a Peronist rally in the Plaza de Mayo on June 16, the Plaza was bombed as a part of a failed coup attempt by Anti-Peronists, which killed more than 300 civilians. In response, Peronists destroyed several churches and hundreds of Anti-Peronists and Priests were arrested.

The 1960s served as a decade of significant change for the Catholic Church in Argentina. The severed relationship caused by the Peron dictatorship coincided with major political shifts in Latin America. Following the Second Vatican Council's conclusion in 1965, the Catholic Church experienced a renewal of morals, with a greater focus on interaction in the social sphere. Increased interaction between the church and the poor living in slums/rural areas of Latin America created stronger connections between classes and political movements. Following the overthrow of Peron in 1955, many sectors of Argentinian society struggled to create and construct new projects. A widespread ban on the Peronist Party removed a majority of the population out of the political system. The ban created a power struggle amongst labor unionist groups, as well as economic and political groups. The struggle for power between groups was halted by a lack of long term legitimacy, resulting in political groups unable to enforce their ideas on others. Support for the Church and its civil power increased as a result.

In the military government of the post-Peron era, young people were led towards political involvement through working with the church. The radicalization of the Catholic Church as a result of the Second Vatican Council paved the way for increasing revolutionary thought, with the pressure of injustice and an incapable infrastructure being presented to the young people of society. In direct response to the council, the Movement of Priests for the Third World was created. With a focus on supporting work force conflicts, the priests outwardly supported socialist revolutionary beliefs from 1967 to 1976. Within this era of revolutionary growth, there became different ways of interpreting the future of the Catholic Church in response to the concern's of state terrorism. Scholar Gustavo Morello has argued that the church fractured into 3 categories, each based on the relationship between the Catholic Church and the state. National Catholics held the belief that the church and the state were to be closely aligned, and that "only a Catholic State could guarantee a Catholic society". Official Catholics understood the importance of the relationship between the state and the Church, however keeping most powers separate. Popular Catholics, which used their links of the past with the state in order to protect human lives in the present. Finally, a fourth form of Catholicism, one in which threats towards human lives were to be seen as a call for Catholics to stand in harm's way.

The relations of the Catholic Church and the Argentine Government improved after the overthrow of Peron. In 1966, a Concordat between Argentina and the Holy See was signed that governs to today the relations between the two, and explicitly states that it is the Pope who exclusively controls the appointment of Bishops. The radicalization of both the Catholic Church and of Argentina's politics resulted in violence by religiously motivated leftist groups. The growing violence and revolutionary thought in the public sphere was linked to the fracturing occurring within the church. Ideas of implementing concepts discussed at the Second Vatican Council faced backlash from those committed to the conservative, national-Catholicism of the pre-Peron Argentina.

Rise of Leftist Violence

The relationship between the church and the state have been characterized by conflicts with leftist guerrilla organizations, conflicts over human rights abuses, and economic injustices. During this period, Liberation theology became popular in the Church after the Second Vatican Council, which coincided with the rise of leftist armed groups, to which some priests and numerous lay Catholics were attached to.The clashing that occurred through political and theological changes led to the rise of a Christian militant group, the Montoneros. Beginning with the abduction of former president Pedro Aramburu on May 29, 1970, the Montoneros incited political violence, combined with the pressure coming from labor strikes and protests resulted in a loss of trust in the left. With the increase in political violence during the return of the Peronist regime (1973–1976), the influence of conservatives in the Church increased, and even more so after the 1976 coup d'état by the military, which gave way to a right wing military junta, which became infamous for the Dirty War.Over the course of the Dirty War, tens of thousands of Argentinians were abducted or went missing through these operations incorporated by the state, raising further concerns over the issue of human rights in the country. The rise in state-sanctioned violence had a direct impact on the growth of human rights activism, especially in organizations created by the public.

The positions adopted by the Church authorities during the Dirty War varied. Depending on each case, they went from the open support of some bishops and priests to the armed groups of the left; to the explicit support the junta and its actions. The vast majority of the clergy remained on the sidelines, either because they ignored the events produced, or because they chose not to get involved. A number of those who disappeared during the Dirty War were priests. The role of the church as human rights activists was received by the state as Marxist/Communists, especially because the poor were perceived as most likely to organize. Whilst political beliefs varied, the Liberation Theology movement in Argentina built itself out of long term injustices that had been ignored by the church. In the face of scrutiny or death, the religious commitment of the Catholics was the same commitment to the cause as the poor.

During its peak, the human rights activists in Argentina caught the attention of the United States, whose attention to activism surrounding foreign nations was significantly heightened by the Cold War and concerns of communism. The result came in 1977, in the form of the senate's military aid authorization bill, which cut off all US military and commercial sales to Argentina. With a lack of foreign support, the military junta accepted a visit from the Inter-American Human Rights Commission (IAHRC) in 1978.

The first ever visit of a Pope to Argentina took place in 1982, after the end of the disastrous Falklands War. John Paul II had planned a pastoral visit to the United Kingdom, which was important for ecumenical relations with the Anglican Church, but he didn't want to rebuff Argentine Catholics. He sent a letter to the Argentine people and carried out a brief visit to the country.

=== Post-Junta ===
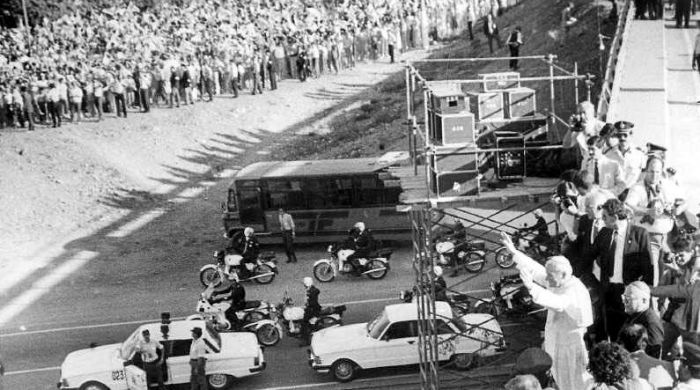
Visit of Pope John Paul II to Mendoza on April 7, 1987.

With the return to democracy in 1983, there was a return to previous debates, including the situation of children born out of wedlock, marriage, and divorce. The controversy on these issues were especially significant during the administration of President Raúl Alfonsín.

In 1987, Pope John Paul II paid a visit to Argentina for a second time for the first World Youth Day in Buenos Aires, an initiative led by the Pope and Argentine Cardinal Eduardo Pironio.

During the administration of President Carlos Menem (1989–1999), the "day of the unborn child" that Menem himself promoted in support of the defense of the Unborn was declared on March 25. Menem was recognized by Pope John Paul II for his dedication to this cause. However, several prominent Bishops condemned Menem's economic policies because they increased the poverty rate.

=== 21st Century ===
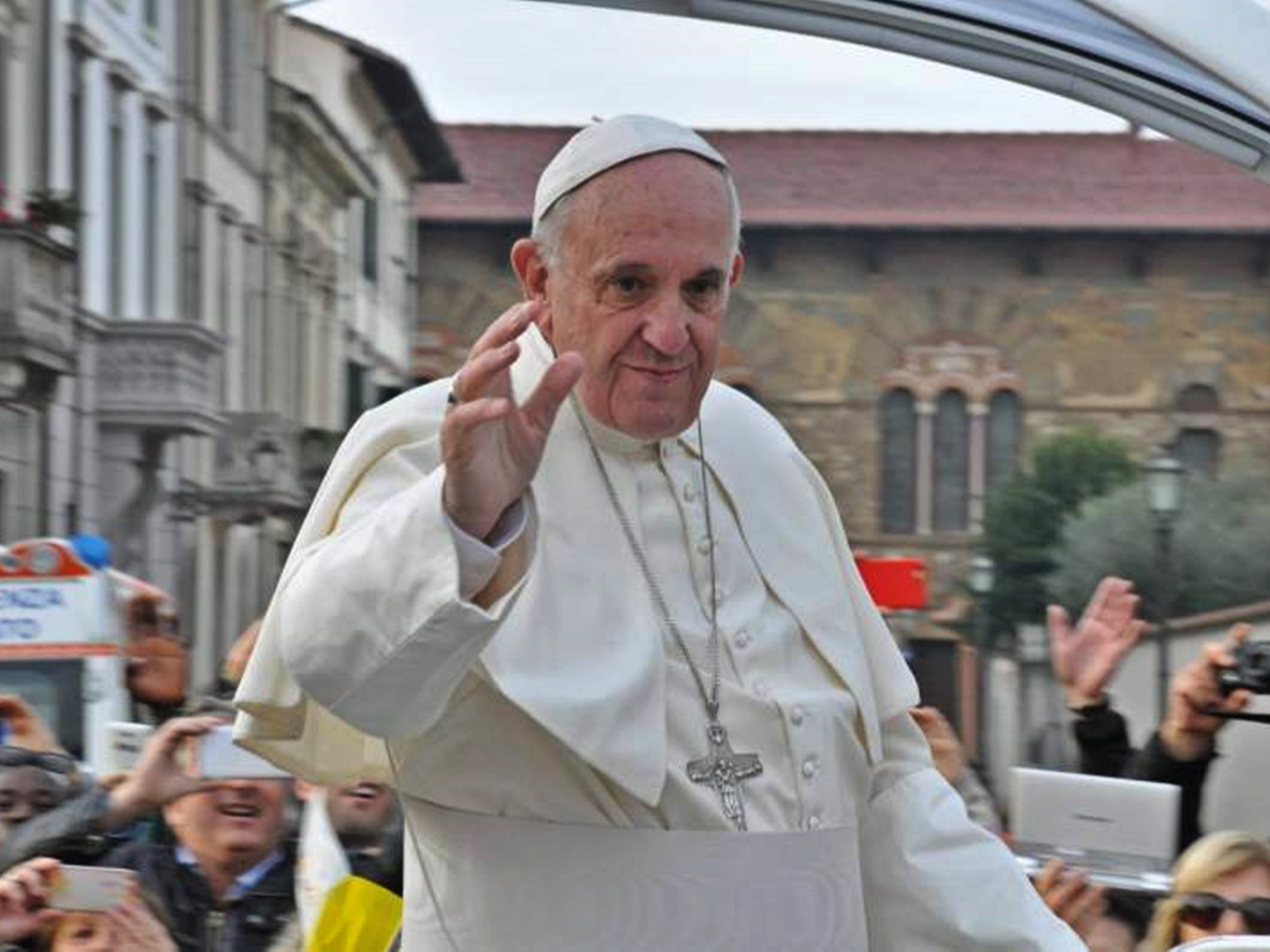
Jorge Mario Bergoglio was the first pope born in the Americas.

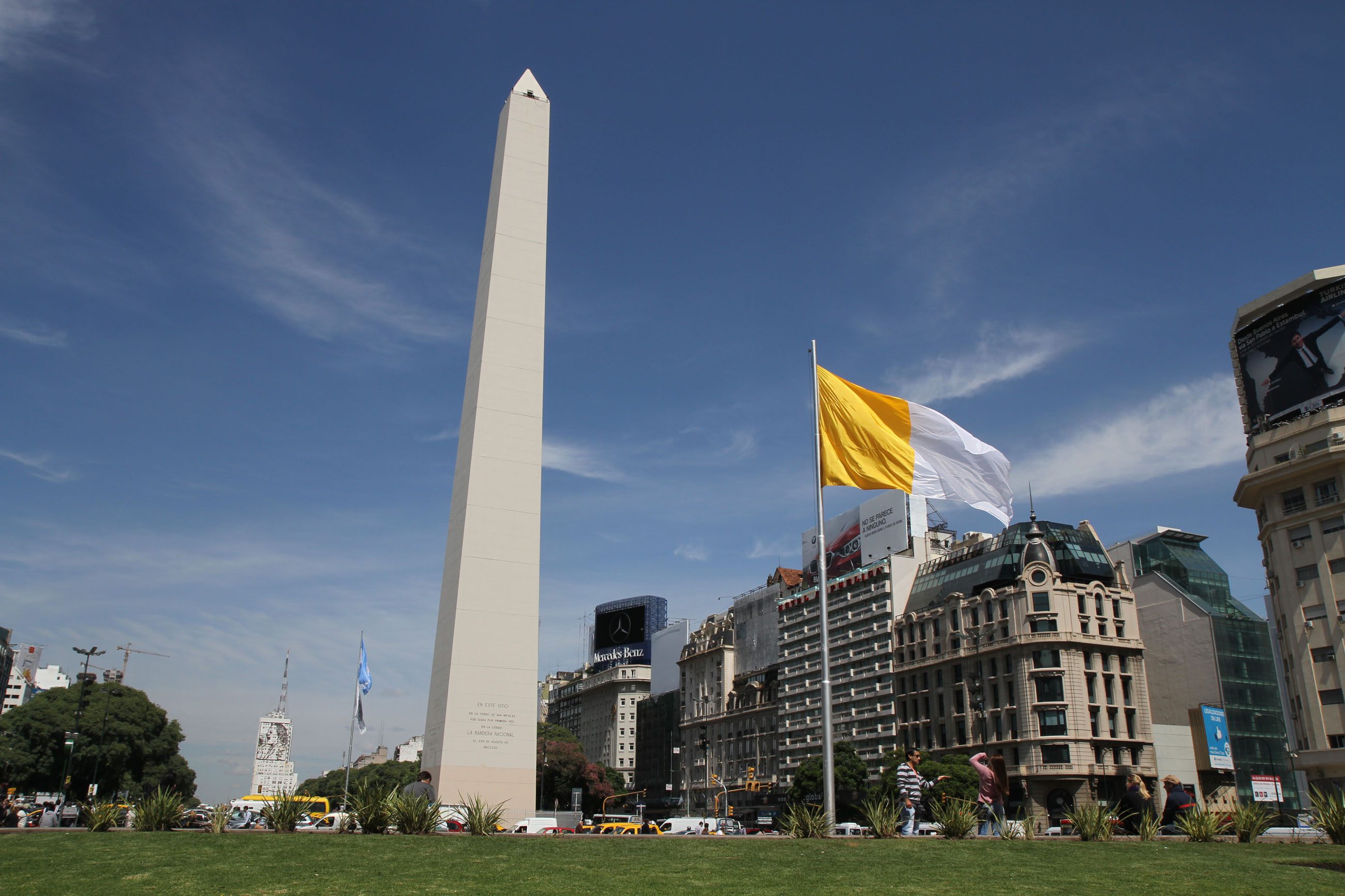
Vatican flag in Plaza de la República next to the Obelisco.

Relations between church and state became bitter during the presidency of Nestor Carlos Kirchner. Relations with Cardinal Jorge Mario Bergoglio (now Pope Francis), Archbishop of Buenos Aires, were very strained. Before which the government avoided participation in the traditional Te Deum prayer celebrations at the Buenos Aires Cathedral, including those corresponding to the anniversaries of the May Revolution.

Conflicts, such as the displacement of the Military Bishop Antonio Baseotto, who opposed the policies of the Minister of Health, Ginés González García who promoted the decriminalization of abortion and the distribution of condoms to young people; by viewing his appointment that was interpreted as incitement to violence. Communicators linked to the government, such as Horacio Verbitsky, disseminated notes and books dedicated to accusing many clerics of collaboration with human rights violations during the Dirty War.

Nestor Carlos Kirchner was succeeded in 2007 by his wife, Cristina Fernández de Kirchner, who identifies as Catholic. During her term, same-sex marriages became legal, which kept relations between the Government and the Church strained. The Catholic Church, together with Protestant denominations organized protests against the proposed law. Cardinal Bergoglio issued a statement to lawmakers who opposed the bill, calling the effort "a movement by the father of lies to confuse and deceive the children of God." And during a meeting of the Argentine Episcopal Conference, in a rare political statement, he urged Catholics to oppose the politicians who supported the bill. However it was still legalized in Argentina regardless, becoming the first country in Latin America to do so. Despite these divergent points, President Kirchner expressed several times her opposition to the legalization of abortion during her two terms. Shortly after assuming her second term, the president reaffirmed this position in a meeting of more than 45 minutes that she held with the Episcopal Conference; and blocked debate in the Chamber of Deputies regarding it.

In 2013, Cardinal Bergoglio was elected Pope and this led to an improvement in relations between the Catholic Church and the government.

In 2023, the country was scored 4 out of 4 for religious freedom.

== Demographics ==
Catholic demographics estimates
Year	%
2004	89.25%
2008	76.5%
2014	71%
2019	62.9%
2024	67.8%

== Pastoral regions ==
- Región Noroeste (NOA) (Argentine Northwest Region)
- Región Noreste (NEA) (Northeast Region)
- Región de Cuyo (Cuyo Region)
- Región Centro (Central Region)
- Región Litoral (Littoral Region)
- Región Buenos Aires (Buenos Aires Region)
- Región Platense (Platense Region)
- Región Patagonia-Comahue (Patagonia–Comahue Region)

=== Divisions by region ===
- Northwest – 10 dioceses: Añatuya, Cafayate, Catamarca, Concepción, Humahuaca, Jujuy, Orán, Salta, Santiago del Estero, and Tucumán
- Northeast – 9 dioceses: Corrientes, Formosa, Goya, Posadas, Puerto Iguazú, Reconquista, Resistencia, Santo Tomé, San Roque
- Cuyo – 5 dioceses: La Rioja, Mendoza, San Rafael, San Juan de Cuyo, San Luis
- Central – 6 dioceses: Córdoba, Cruz del Eje, Deán Funes, San Francisco, Villa de la Concepción del Río Cuarto, Villa María; Greek Melkite Exarchate
- Littoral – 7 dioceses: Concordia, Gualeguaychú, Paraná, Rafaela, Rosario, Santa Fe de la Vera Cruz, Venado Tuerto
- Buenos Aires – 11 dioceses: Avellaneda–Lanús, Buenos Aires, Gregorio de Laferrere, Lomas de Zamora, Merlo-Moreno, Morón, Quilmes, San Isidro, San Martín, San Miguel, San Justo; Military Bishopric; Oriental Ordinariate; 3 eparchies: Armenian Eparchy, Maronite Eparchy, Ukrainian Eparchy
- Platense – 10 dioceses: Azul, Bahía Blanca, Chascomús, La Plata, Mar del Plata, Mercedes–Luján, San Nicolás, Santa Rosa, Zárate-Campana
- Patagonia-Comahue – 6 dioceses: Alto Valle del Río Negro, Comodoro Rivadavia, Neuquén, Río Gallegos, San Carlos de Bariloche, Viedma

== See also ==
- Catholic Church by country
- Catholic sexual abuse cases in Latin America
- Church-state relations in Argentina
- List of Catholic dioceses in Argentina
- Religion in Argentina
- Freedom of religion in Argentina
- List of South American Saints
