= Moisés Julio Blanchoud =

Argentine prelate (1923–2016)

- Prelate of Archdiocese of Salta (emeritus)
- Church: Roman Catholic Church
- See: Roman Catholic Archdiocese of Salta
- In office: 1984–1999
- Predecessor: Carlos Mariano Pérez Eslava, S.D.B.
- Successor: Mario Antonio Cargnello
- Previous post: Bishop of Río Cuarto

Orders
- Ordination: December 14, 1947

Personal details
- Born: September 4, 1923 Esperanza, Argentina
- Died: February 28, 2016 (aged 92) Santa Fe, Argentina

Moisés Julio Blanchoud (September 4, 1923 – February 28, 2016) was an Argentine Prelate of the Catholic Church.

Blanchoud was born in Esperanza, Argentina and was ordained a priest on December 14, 1947. Blanchoud was appointed auxiliary bishop of the Diocese of Río Cuarto as well as titular bishop Belali on February 13, 1960, and ordained April 24, 1960. Blanchoud was installed as bishop of the Diocese of Río Cuarto on March 7, 1963. Blanchoud was appointed to the Archdiocese of Salta on January 7, 1984, and retired from the diocese August 6, 1999. In October 2002 Blanchoud was appointed Apostolic Administrator of Archdiocese of Santa Fe de la Vera Cruz and resigned on March 30, 2003.
