= Jorge Rubén Lugones =

Argentine Catholic prelate (born 1952)

Jorge Rubén Lugones S.J.
- Bishop of Lomas de Zamora
- Church: Catholic Church
- Diocese: Diocese of Lomas de Zamora
- Appointed: 14 October 2008
- Predecessor: Agustín Roberto Radrizzani
- Previous post: Bishop of Orán (1999-2008)

Orders
- Ordination: 3 December 1988
- Consecration: 30 July 1999 by Jorge Mario Bergoglio

Personal details
- Born: 31 July 1952 (age 74) Veinticinco de Mayo, Buenos Aires Province, Argentina

Jorge Rubén Lugones S.J. (born 31 July 1952) is an Argentine prelate of the Catholic Church. He served as bishop of Orán from 1999 until 2008, when he became bishop of Lomas de Zamora.

== Life ==
Born in Veinticinco de Mayo, Lugones became a member of the Society of Jesus on 22 April 1979. He was ordained to the priesthood on 3 December 1988.

On 2 June 1999, he was appointed bishop of Orán. Lugones received his episcopal consecration on the following 30 July from Jorge Mario Bergoglio, archbishop of Buenos Aires, the later pope Francis, with archbishop of Resistencia, Carmelo Juan Giaquinta, and archbishop emeritus of Resistencia, Juan José Iriarte, serving as co-consecrators. He was installed as bishop on 6 August 1999.

On 14 October 2008, he was appointed bishop of Lomas de Zamora. He was installed on the following 22 November.
