= Archdiocese of Salta =

Latin Catholic territory in Argentina

Coordinates: 24.7883°S 65.4105°W

Archdiocese of Salta Archidioecesis Saltensis Arquidiócesis de Salta

Catholic
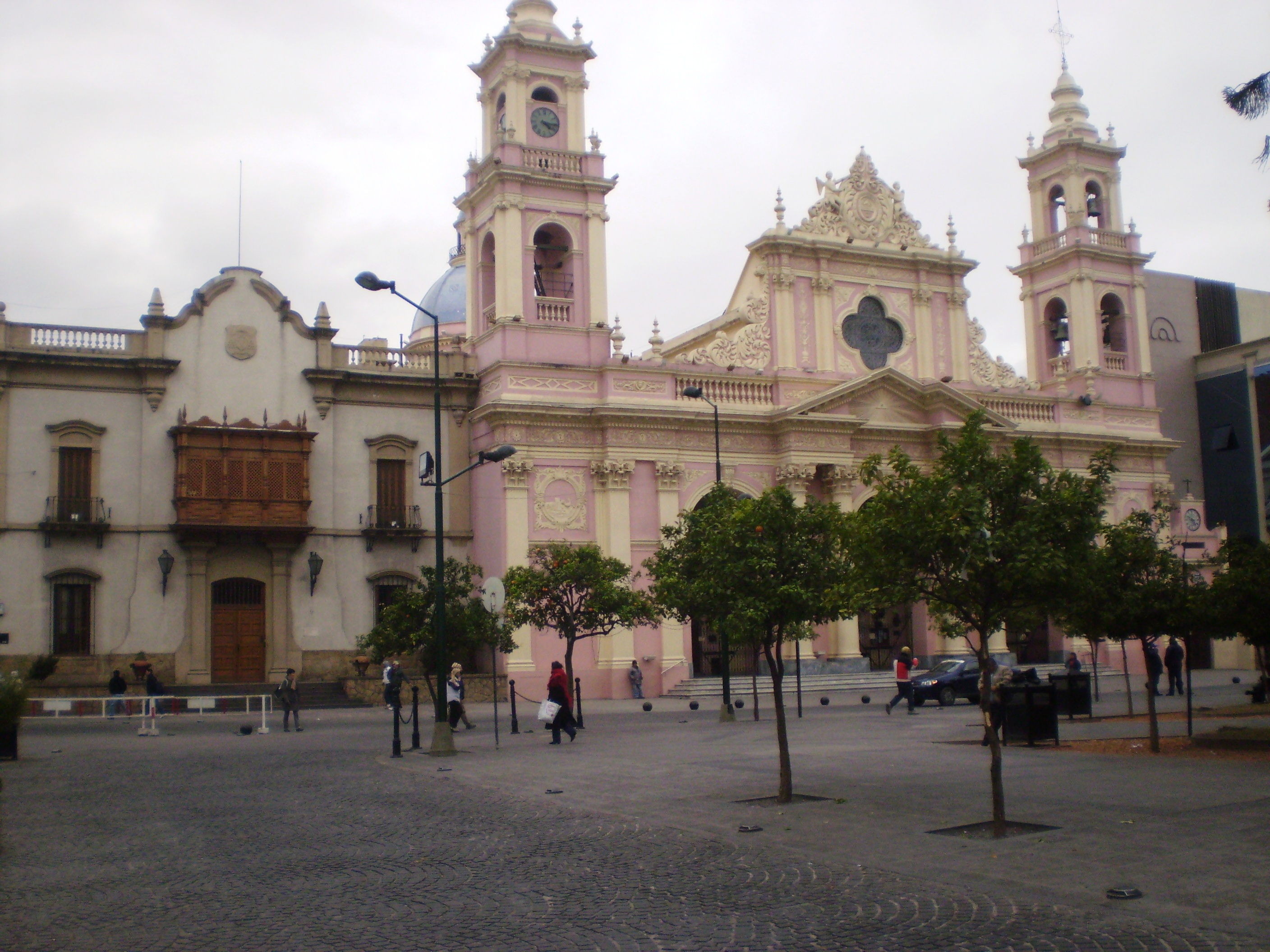
- Cathedral Shrine Our Lord and the Virgin of the Miracle

Location
- Country: Argentina
- Ecclesiastical province: Salta

Statistics
- Area: 92,860 km^{2} (35,850 sq mi)
- Population: Total; Catholics: (as of 2010); 797,000; 717,000 (90%)
- Parishes: 57

Information
- Denomination: Catholic Church
- Sui iuris church: Latin Church
- Rite: Roman Rite
- Established: 28 March 1806 (220 years ago)
- Cathedral: Cathedral of Our Lord and Our Lady of Miracles in Salta
- Patron saint: St James the Less; St Philip

Current leadership
- Pope: Leo XIV
- Metropolitan Archbishop: Mario Antonio Cargnello

Map

Website
- Website of the Archdiocese

The Archdiocese of Salta is a Latin Church archdiocese of the Catholic Church in Argentina. Erected on 28 March 1806 as the Diocese of Salta, it is a metropolitan see, responsible for the suffragan Dioceses of Catamarca, Jujuy and Orán as well as the Territorial Prelatures of Cafayate and Humahuaca.

== History ==
It was created on 17 February 1807, the territory being taken from the ancient Diocese of Tucumán (the see was in Córdoba). Until 1898, it comprised also the civil Provinces of Tucumán, Santiago del Estero, and Catamarca, which were then detached to form new dioceses. It was elevated to an archdiocese on 20 April 1934.

== Bishops ==
=== Ordinaries ===
- Nicolás Videla del Pino (1807–1819)
- José Eusebio Colombres (1858–1859)
- Buenaventura Rizo Patrón (1860–1884)
- Pablo Padilla y Bárcena (1893–1898), appointed Bishop of Tucumán
- Matías Linares y Sanzetenea (1898–1914)
- José Calixto Gregorio Romero y Juárez (1914–1919)
- Julio Campero y Aráoz (1923–1934)
- Roberto José Tavella (1934–1963)
- Carlos Mariano Pérez Eslava (1963–1984)
- Moisés Julio Blanchoud (1984–1999)
- Mario Antonio Cargnello (1999–present)

=== Coadjutor archbishop ===
- Mario Antonio Cargnello (1998–1999)

=== Auxiliary bishops ===
- Miguel Moisés Aráoz (1871–1883)
- Pablo Padilla y Bárcena (1891–1893), appointed Bishop here
- José Calixto Gregorio Romero y Juárez (1914–1919), appointed Bishop here
- Pedro Reginaldo Lira (1958–1961), appointed Bishop of San Francisco
- Carlos Horacio Ponce de Léon (1962–1966), appointed Bishop of San Nicolás de los Arroyos
- Raúl Arsenio Casado (1975–1983), appointed Bishop of Jujuy

== Territorial losses ==
Year	Along with	To form
1897		Diocese of Tucumán
1934		Diocese of Jujuy
1961		Diocese of Orán
1969	Diocese of Catamarca	Territorial Prelature of Cafayate
