= Jorge Novak =

Argentine Catholic bishop (1928–2001)

Servant of God Jorge Novak SVD
- Bishop of Quilmes
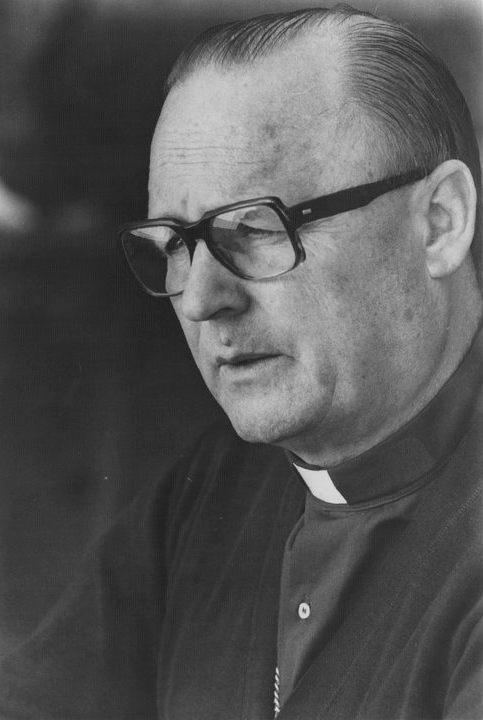
- Church: Roman Catholic Church
- Diocese: Quilmes
- See: Quilmes
- Appointed: 7 August 1976
- Term ended: 9 July 2001
- Predecessor: None; diocese created
- Successor: Luis Teodorico Stöckler

Orders
- Ordination: 10 January 1954 by Germiniano Esorto
- Consecration: 19 September 1976 by Pio Laghi

Personal details
- Born: Jorge Novak; 4 March 1928 San Miguel Arcángel, Adolfo Alsina Partido, Buenos Aires Province, Argentina
- Died: 9 July 2001 (aged 73) Quilmes, Buenos Aires, Argentina
- Education: Pontifical Gregorian University
- Motto: Ven Espíritu Santo
- Coat of arms

Jorge Novak (4 March 1928 – 9 July 2001) was an Argentine Roman Catholic religious priest of the Society of the Divine Word who served as the Bishop of Quilmes from 1976 until his death. He is best known for his staunch defense of human rights and critical statements regarding the position of the Church in Argentina during the period of dictatorship in the 1970s. He was also known for his promotion of proper economic management when the nation's economic fortunes dwindled and promoted jobs and strong action for the poor and neglected.

The cause for Novak's beatification started in 2017 and was interrupted in 2026; he is now titled as a Servant of God.

== Life ==
Jorge Novak was born on 4 March 1928 to Jorge Novak and Christina Prediger; he was of Volga German descent. He had seven brothers.

Novak entered the Divine Word Missionaries and made his initial profession on 1 March 1947 and on 1 March 1953 made his solemn profession into the order. He was ordained to the priesthood in 1954 in Bahía Blanca and in 1958 obtained a doctorate in historical sciences from the Pontifical Gregorian in Rome.

In 1972 he became the provincial superior for the order and held that appointment until his elevation to the episcopate. Pope Paul VI later created the Quilmes diocese through the papal bull Cups Regimini on 2 August 1976 and appointed Novak as its first bishop on 7 August. Novak received his episcopal consecration on 19 September from Pio Laghi in the new diocese's Immaculate Conception cathedral. There was initial apprehension surrounding his episcopal appointment due to strong rumors of his authoritative professorship in La Plata.

Novak railed against human rights abuses and criticized the dictatorship and the guerillas for their violence and carnage during the period of civil unrest and conflict. He pleaded for proper negotiations and peace in 1982 during the Falklands War. It was after the disappearances of 30,000 people became public that he served as a sort of 'spokesman' for their next of kin asking for investigations and closure for the families of those lost.

He co-founded the Ecumenical Movement for Human Rights alongside several others in February 1976. In September 1984 he was on a trip in Costa Rica when he was struck with Guillain-Barré and was recuperating to recover his motor skills until 1985.

Towards the end of his life he wrote to the government demanding greater action for the poor and often used strong language in order to force the point across. He was also seen leading demonstrations for jobs and organized soup kitchens in shanties around urban centers. In 2000 he encouraged one of his priests and the prominent social worker Luis Farinello to go into politics to run for a Senate seat in the October congressional elections. Novak issued a decree that authorized Farinello to pursue politics but removed him from all ecclesial responsibilities from his public announcement of his candidature and for the duration of his mandate if elected. The decree cited canon 904 of canon law which allowed Farinello to "celebrate Mass without the attendance of faithful" and exhorted Farinello to adhere to the values of the Gospel and the social teachings of the Church.

On 28 April 1995 he issued a statement asking for forgiveness for the failure of the Argentine priesthood and episcopate to act during the 1970s when people were disappearing and being killed. Novak pleaded for forgiveness "for our insensitivities" while also referring to their collective "cowardice" and "omissions" which he affirmed made them complicit in the actions of the dictatorship. Back in 1991 he was a sharp critic of President Carlos Saul Menem for his decision to pardon Jorge Videla and other jailed leaders of the dictatorship and referred to the pardon as a "humiliating defeat" for those who suffered during the dictatorship. In June 2001 he gave his last sermon and discussed the growing economic crisis in which he asked: "How is it possible that in this day and age there are still people who die from hunger, condemned to illiteracy, and without a roof over their heads?"

Novak had an operation for stomach cancer (the disease he kept a close secret) and later died from it at 4:00am on 9 July 2001. Twelve bishops attended his funeral as did the apostolic nuncio (later cardinal) Santos Abril y Castelló; the people shouted "Viva el Padre Jorge" and "Viva Monsignor Novak" as his casket was carried out of the church.

== Beatification process ==
The cause commenced on 19 August 2017 after the Congregation for the Causes of Saints declared "nihil obstat" (no objections) and titled Novak as a Servant of God. On 7 April 2026, the diocese announced the cause had ceased, after a Vatican investigation discovered Novak possibly mishandled a case of priest misconduct. Their statement expressed "no moral judgment on the life, virtues, or pastoral action of" Novak.
