= Mario Antonio Cargnello =

Argentine clergyman (born 1952

The Most Reverend Mario Antonio Cargnello
- Archbishop of Salta
- Church: Roman Catholic Church
- Archdiocese: Salta
- See: Salta
- Appointed: 6 August 1999
- Predecessor: Moisés Julio Blanchoud
- Previous post(s): Bishop of Orán (1994-98); Coadjuator Archbishop of Salta (1998-99); Second Vice-President of the Argentine Episcopal Conference (2011-17)

Orders
- Ordination: 8 November 1975
- Consecration: 24 June 1994 by Elmer Osmar Ramón Miani

Personal details
- Born: Mario Antonio Cargnello; 20 March 1952 (age 73); San Fernando del Valle de Catamarca, Argentina
- Motto: Que se haga Tu voluntad
- Coat of arms

Mario Antonio Cargnello (born 20 March 1952) is an Argentinian clergyman. He has been the Roman Catholic Archbishop of Salta since 1999.

== Biography ==
Cargnello was born in Catamarca, Argentina.

He was ordained as a priest on 8 November 1975. On 7 Apr 1994 he was appointed as Bishop of Orán and was later ordained on 24 Jun 1994. Pope John Paul II appointed him as Coadjutor Archbishop of Salta on 24 June 1998. He started his current role as Archbishop of Salta on 6 August 1999, after the previous archbishop retired.

In November 2011, he was elected as the second vice president to the Argentine Episcopal Conference.
