= Episcopal Conference of Argentina =

Assembly of Catholic bishops of Argentina

The Argentine Episcopal Conference (Spanish: Conferencia Episcopal Argentina) is an episcopal conference of the Catholic Church in Argentina that gathers the bishops of the country in order to discuss pastoral issues and in general all matters that have to do with the Church. The following are members of the Conference:

- The diocesan bishops and others considered such de jure;
- The coadjutor bishops;
- The auxiliary bishops;
- The Eastern Catholic bishops with a see in Argentina;
- The titular bishops by appointment of the Holy See or the Conference itself;

Guests of the Conference are the Apostolic Nuncio and other bishops (titular and emeritus).

== See also ==
- Catholic Church in Argentina
- Christianity in Argentina
