= Eurasian beaver reintroduction =

Effort in Europe to restore beaver range

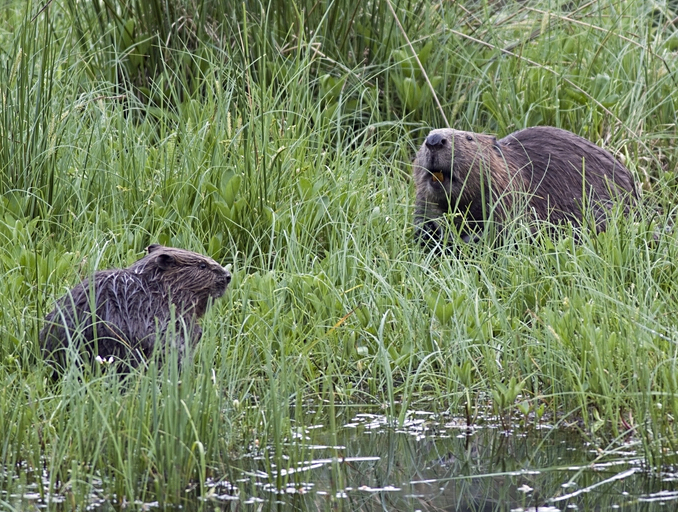
Eurasian beaver and kit by the River Tay in Scotland. After being extinct for several centuries, beavers were reintroduced to Great Britain in 2009.

The Eurasian beaver has been the successful subject of a century of official and unapproved species reintroduction programs in Europe and Asia. Beavers had been driven to the point of near extinction in Eurasia by humans trapping and hunting them for their meat, fur and castoreum. The reintroductions and conservation led in 2008, to the IUCN assessing the Eurasian beaver as being of "least concern" on its red list.

== Disappearance from Eurasia ==
The Eurasian beaver was hunted and trapped to the point of near extinction. Fossil evidence shows that the Eurasian beaver lived from Western Europe to the Chinese-Mongolian border. By the beginning of the 20th century, only about 1,200 Eurasian beavers were left in their native area. Eight relict populations survived, according to IUCN, in Belarus, China, France, Germany, Kazakhstan, Luxembourg, Mongolia, Norway and Russia.

== Beaver effects on ecosystem and habitat ==
Beavers are considered ecosystem engineers for their ability to create complex wetland ecosystems by tree-felling, dam-building, and burrowing. Wetlands provide habitats for many other species of fish, birds, mammals, and vegetation, leading to increased biodiversity. Beaver dams push water laterally onto flood plains, increasing groundwater and surface water storage. Presence of beavers can improve water quality through sediment trapping in dams, and provide natural flood control. Ponds and canals store water in areas susceptible to drought. Beaver reintroduction causes flooding in areas that were not previously flooded. Over saturation causes some plants and trees die, increasing coarse woody debris (CWD) in the area. CWD attracts wood insects, and provides nesting holes for waterfowl and areas of refuge for fish. Trees and vegetation migrate to drier areas, leading to diversified plant species. Presence of beavers increases numbers in aquatic invertebrates, insects, amphibians, birds and bats. Ponds create nursing ground for fish, increased fish habitat and habitat complexity. Beaver dams can have a negative impact on migratory fish such as salmonids, preventing fish from moving upstream to headwaters. Deep beaver ponds provide overwintering habitat for fish, reduce ice cover, and stabilize temperature regimes.

== Reintroduction methods ==
Beavers are reintroduced through planned and unplanned releases, such as escapes from captive populations. Unplanned releases can happen through escapes from zoos or wildlife centers, or through natural spread. Planned releases are managed by governmental organizations and environmental non-profits. These are most successful when managed locally. Successful trials to reintroduce beavers start by raising community awareness and support, through community outreach and education.

The reintroduction of a species can cause rapid change to high-use domesticated landscapes. These changes cause a range of emotional reactions to the community present. Attempting to understand these reactions is important for managing organizations to aid in coexistence between humans and beavers, and population success. The health of a reintroduced species impacts humans and domesticated animals, and other wildlife. Health assessments should take place before and regularly after its reintroduction. In unplanned releases or escapes, it is difficult to produce a health baseline of a species.

As a flagship species, beavers raise awareness and resources for wide-scale riparian and woodland restoration programs by stimulating conservation awareness. Beavers increase ecotourism, as interest in beavers and other biodiversity in ecosystems with beavers increases. Beaver ecotourism has positive socio-economic impacts for local businesses and community members.

== Reintroductions ==
By 2020, due to government-approved and unofficial reintroductions, as well as protection programs and consequent natural migration, there were at least 1.5 million beavers in Europe.

Initial reintroduction populations show a time lag between the rate of population growth and the resource growth rates. This is seen in an initial population growth followed by decrease in populations to settle into the amount of resources available to the beaver populations.

=== Government-approved reintroductions ===
Successful government-approved introductions began in Sweden in 1922, with 80 beavers. The same decade, Norway began reintroduction as well. The USSR, Latvia and Finland followed in the 1930s, as did Germany (which also had a remnant population). In the 1940s and 1950s, Russia, Poland, Belarus (remnant population), Estonia, Lithuania, Norway (remnant population), Mongolia (remnant population), France (remnant population) and Switzerland had reintroduction programs. In the 1960s and 1970s, Germany, Poland and Latvia resumed reintroductions, while Austria and Kazakhstan began them. Hungary began in 1980. Ukraine's beaver restoration was underway by the 1970s.

In 1988, Netherlands began reintroduction, followed by Czech Republic (1991), China (1992 - translocation from a Chinese native population) Slovakia (1995), and Croatia (1996), Belgium (1998), Romania (1998) and Denmark (1999).

Reintroduction programs followed in Serbia (2003), Spain (2003), Bosnia and Herzegovina (2006), and United Kingdom (2009).

=== Unofficial reintroductions ===
In 2004, 18 Eurasian beavers were detected in Spain between Milagro and Alfaro, in the Ebro river. Investigations determined they originated in Bavaria and had been released in March 2003, though those responsible were never identified. Regional government plans to remove the animals met criticism from conservation groups arguing the Eurasian beaver is native to Spain with a fossil history of 1.4 million years and historical references until around 1583. After consulting with the European Union, the removal plans were terminated. By 2020, beavers had colonised the Ebro in La Rioja, Navarre, and Zaragoza; the Zadorra river up to Vitoria-Gasteiz, the Arga up to Pamplona, the Huerva up to Mezalocha, and the Jalón into the province of Soria. In November 2021, a young beaver was photographed for the first time outside of the Ebro basin, in the upper Duero in Soria. In June 2024, a beaver was sighted at the Tagus river basin near Zorita de los Canes.

In 2020, beavers were introduced secretly to two sites in central Italy, and have since spread rapidly.

=== Reintroduction by migration ===
Due to beavers travelling across borders, populations became established by 2020 in Slovenia (from Croatia and Austria), Liechtenstein (from Switzerland), and Luxembourg (mostly from Belgium, though according to IUCN, Luxembourg's native population was never extirpated).

Beaver populations also became established by 2021, by migration from Romania, in Bulgaria and Moldova.

In 2023, researchers found signs of beaver activity in Portugal, some 5 km from the Spanish border.

=== Planned reintroductions ===
In 2022, researchers published a feasibility study on the reintroduction of beavers to areas of Greece bordering Albania, North Macedonia and Bulgaria.

== Specific reintroductions ==
=== Reintroduction within Russia ===
In Russia, by 1917, beaver populations remained in four isolated territories: in the Dnieper basin; in the Don basin; in the northern Urals and in the upper reaches of the Yenisei along the Azas river. The total number of beavers did not exceed 900. Beaver hunting was banned in 1922. In 1923, a hunting reserve was organised in the Voronezh region along the Usman river, which in 1927 was transformed into the Voronezh State Reserve. At the same time, two more such reserves were created: Berezinsky and Kondo-Sosvinsky. 1927 also the first attempts to reintroduce beavers in other areas. As a result, by the end of the 1960s, the beaver's range in the Soviet Union was almost as large as in the 17th century. The beavers' growing numbers made commercial capture possible again. In 2016, there were an estimated 661,000 beavers in Russia; in 2019, the estimate was 774,600.

=== Reintroduction into Scotland ===
The first sustained and significant population of wild-living beavers in the United Kingdom since the late 16th century became established on the River Tay catchment in Scotland as early as 2001, and spread widely in the catchment, numbering from 20 to 100 individuals. Because these beavers were apparently escapees from captive beaver enclosures, such as Bamff Estate in Perthshire, Scottish Natural Heritage initially planned to remove the Tayside beavers in late 2010. Proponents of the beavers argued that no reason existed to believe that they were of "wrong" genetic stock, and that they should be permitted to remain. One beaver was trapped by Scottish Natural Heritage on the River Ericht in Blairgowrie, Perthshire, in early December 2010, and was held in captivity in the Edinburgh Zoo. In March 2012 the Scottish Government reversed the decision to remove beavers from the Tay, pending the outcome of studies into the suitability of reintroduction.

In 2005, the Scottish government had turned down a licence application for unfenced reintroduction. However, in late 2007, a further application was made by the Royal Zoological Society of Scotland, Scottish Wildlife Trust and Forestry Commission Scotland for a release project in Knapdale, Argyll. This application, termed the Scottish Beaver Trial, was accepted, and the first beavers were released on 29 May 2009 after a 400-year absence, with further releases in 2010. In August 2010, at least two kits, estimated to be eight weeks old and belonging to different family groups, were seen in Knapdale Forest in Argyll. Alongside the trial, the pre-existing population of beavers along the Tay was monitored and assessed.

Following receipt of the results of the Scottish Beaver Trial, in November 2016 the Scottish Government announced that beavers could remain permanently, and would be given protected status as a native species within Scotland. Beavers will be allowed to extend their range naturally from Knapdale and the River Tay; however, to aid this process and improve the health and resilience of the population, a further 28 beavers will be released in Knapdale between 2017 and 2020. A survey of beaver numbers during the winter of 2017–18 estimated that the Tayside population had increased to between 300 and 550 beavers, with beavers now also present in the catchment of the River Forth, and the Trossachs area.

In 2023, two pairs of beavers were released in the Cairngorms. There have since been releases into the Glen Affric and Loch Ness areas of the Highlands.

=== Reintroduction into England and Wales ===
A group of three beavers was spotted on the River Otter in Devon in 2013, apparently successfully bearing three kits the next year. Following concern from local landowners and anglers, as well as farmers worrying that the beavers could carry disease, the government announced that it would capture the beavers and place them in a zoo or wildlife park. A sport-fishing industry lobbyist group, the Angling Trust, said, "it would be irresponsible even to consider reintroducing this species into the wild without first restoring our rivers to good health." These actions were protested by local residents and campaign groups, with environmental journalist George Monbiot describing the government and anglers as 'control freaks': "I'm an angler, and the Angling Trust does not represent me on this issue...most anglers, in my experience, have a powerful connection with nature. The chance of seeing remarkable wild animals while waiting quietly on the riverbank is a major part of why we do it." On 28 January 2015, Natural England declared that the beavers would be allowed to remain on condition that they were free of disease and of Eurasian descent. These conditions were found to be met on 23 March 2015, following the capture and testing of five of the beavers. DNA testing showed that the animals were the once-native Eurasian beaver, and none of the beavers was found to be infected with Echinococcus multilocularis, tularaemia, or bovine TB. On 24 June 2015, video footage from local filmmaker Tom Buckley was featured on the BBC news website showing one of the wild Devon females with two live young.

A partnership including the Wildlife Trusts, Countryside Council for Wales, the Peoples Trust for Endangered Species, Environment Agency Wales, Wild Europe, and Forestry Commission Wales, undertook a study on the feasibility and desirability of a reintroduction of beavers to Wales, with additional funding from Welsh Power Ltd. The resulting reports were published in 2012 with the launch of the Welsh Beaver Project, which is a partnership led by the Wildlife in Wales, and are downloadable from www.welshbeaverproject.org. A 2009 report by Natural England, the government's conservation body, and the People's Trust for Endangered Species recommended that beavers be reintroduced to the wild in England. This goal was realised in November 2016, when beavers were recognised as a British native species. In October 2022, this animal was recognized as a European protected species in England, which legally protected it from being captured, killed, injured, hunted, or disturbed. This decision also limited damaging beaver's dams and burrows.

In 2019, a pair of beavers was reintroduced to North Essex as part of a pioneering natural flood management scheme for East Anglia.

==== In enclosures ====
In 2001, the Kent Wildlife Trust with the Wildwood Trust and Natural England imported two families of Eurasian beavers from Norway to manage a wetland nature reserve. This project pioneered the use of beavers as a wildlife conservation tool in the UK. The success of this project has provided the inspiration behind other projects in Gloucestershire and Argyll. The Kent beaver colony lives in a 130-acre (0.53 km^{2}) fenced enclosure at the wetland of Ham Fen. Subsequently, the population has been supplemented in 2005 and 2008. The beavers continue to help restore the wetland by rehydrating the soils. Six Eurasian beavers were released in 2005 into a fenced lakeside area in Gloucestershire. In 2007, a specially selected group of four Bavarian beavers was released into a fenced enclosure in the Martin Mere nature reserve in Lancashire. The beavers hopefully will form a permanent colony, and the younger pair will be transferred to another location when the adults begin breeding again. The progress of the group will be followed as part of the BBC's Autumnwatch television series. On 19 November 2011, a pair of beaver sisters was released into a 2.5-acre (1 ha) enclosure at Blaeneinion. A colony of beavers is also established in a large enclosure at Bamff, Perthshire.

In June 2017, a pair of beavers was released into a secured area in Cornwall near Ladock, called The Beaver Project. In July 2018 two Eurasian beavers were released into a fenced area 6.5 hectares (16 acres) in size surrounding Greathough Brook near Lydbrook in the Forest of Dean. The UK Government hopes that the presence of the beavers on Forestry Commission land will help to alleviate flooding in a natural way as the animals will construct dams and ponds, slowing the flow of water in the area. The village of Lydbrook was badly affected by flooding in 2012.

The then Environment Secretary Michael Gove, who attended the release, said:

The beaver has a special place in English heritage and the Forest of Dean. This release is a fantastic opportunity to develop our understanding of the potential impacts of reintroductions and help this iconic species, 400 years after it was driven to extinction.

=== Reintroductions in other Eurasian countries ===
- 1922–1939 – Sweden: About 80 beavers were reintroduced to 19 different sites over a 20-year span with an estimated 130,000 individuals present in 2014.
- 1934-1977 - Some 3,000 Eurasian Beavers from Voronezh in Russia were reintroduced to 52 regions of the USSR and neighbouring countries, from Poland to Mongolia.
- 1935 - Finland: in 1935, 17 Eurasian beavers were reintroduced, then two years later North American beavers sourced from New York were released. At the time, a difference between the species was unknown. Today, the North American beaver is considered an invasive species in Finland, and outnumbers Eurasian beavers 5:1. The North American species has since entered Russia.
- 1966–1982 – Bavaria: From extinction, reintroduction has increased the population (2022) to an estimated 6,000 individuals. As one of the oldest reintroduction sites, it is often visited and studied for its management practices.
- 1976–1982 – Austria: Around 40 individuals were introduced in the Danube-Auen National Park downstream of Vienna. They have since then spread to the waters around the Danube inside the city as well. By 2020, an estimated 230 beavers lived in the Vienna region outside the national park proper.
- 1988 – Romania: 21 beavers were successfully reintroduced in 1998 along the Olt River, spreading to other rivers in Covasna county
- 1996–1998 – Croatia: Beavers were extinct in the Balkans for fifty years before their reintroduction. Beavers were sourced from Bavaria.
- 1999 – Denmark: 18 beavers were released at Klosterheden in West Jutland. Since then, other beavers have been released at Arresø in North Zealand.
- 2003 – Spain: beavers were reintroduced to the River Ebro in Spain, with plans for further reintroductions to the Guadalquivir, Guadiana, and Tajo (Tagus) river systems
- 2004 – Serbia: Beavers were extinct in the Balkans for fifty years before their reintroduction. Beavers were sourced from Bavaria.
- 2005 – Bosnia: Beavers were extinct in the Balkans for fifty years before their reintroduction. Beavers were sourced from Bavaria.

== Criticism ==
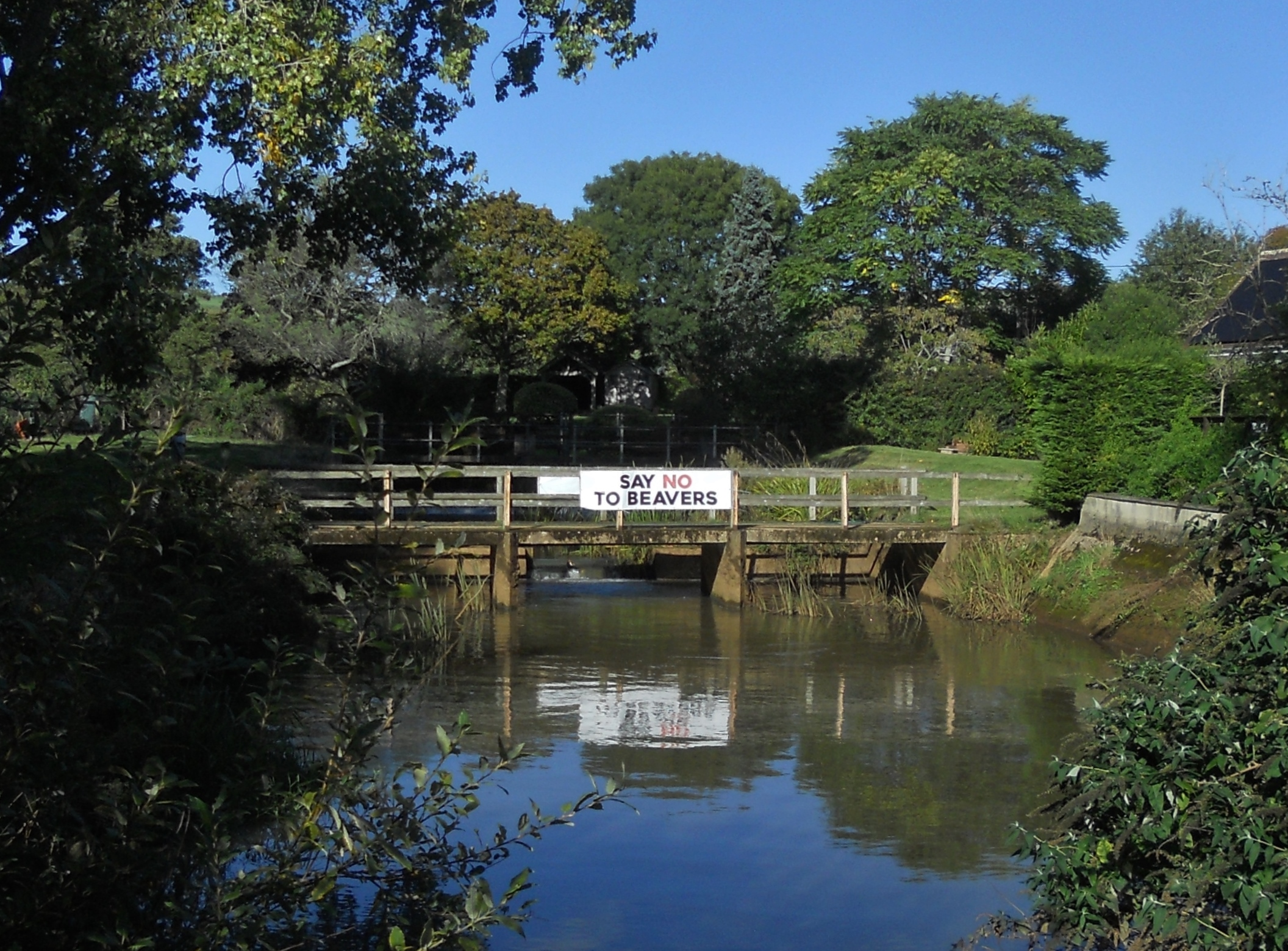
A "say no to beavers" sign in the Isle of Wight.

Beavers can negatively impact agricultural areas, by flooding farmland and decreasing crop yields. Beaver scientists manage these issues by relocating beaver dams, using water sounds to trick beavers into building the dam in different places, or using pipes in dams to help control water levels. These methods were suggested when beavers created dams blocking man-made structures such as culverts. In one case, poles were placed 10 feet in front of a culvert, changing the site of the sound of flowing water, prompting the beavers build the dam at the poles and allowing run-off to go through the culvert. Farmers have reported beavers burrowing in their fields, leading to damage to machinery such as tractors and damage to crops. Governments have addressed this issue by voluntarily compensating farmers for these damages. Translocation and lethal control are options that should be used as a last resort, as both can negatively impact whole ecosystem.
