= Illán de Vacas =

- Municipality
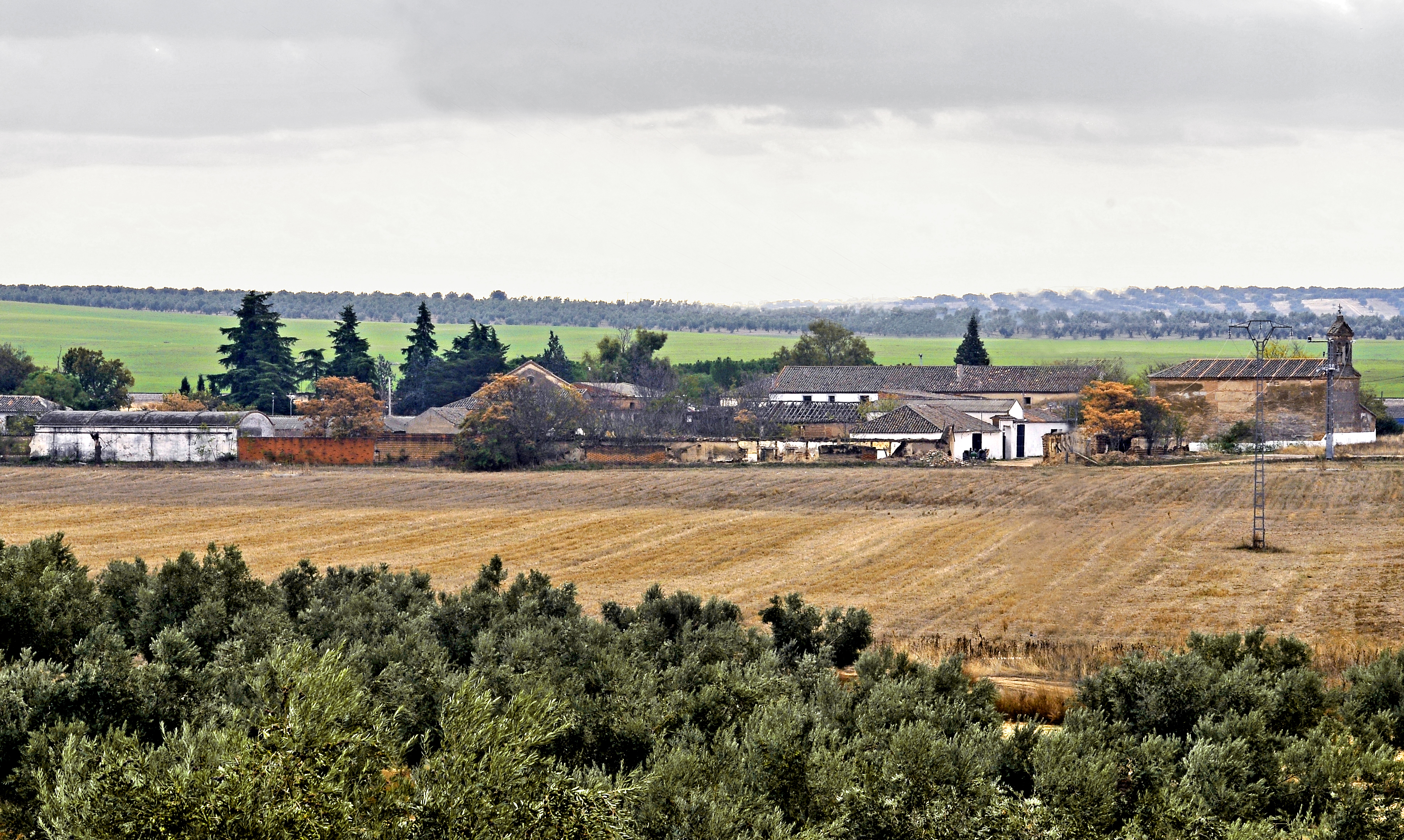
- View of Illán de Vacas

- Location in Mainland Spain
- Coordinates: 39°58′10″N 4°33′27″W
- Country: Spain
- Autonomous community: Castilla–La Mancha
- Province: Toledo

Government
  - Alcalde: Javier Bollaín Renilla (2023-)

Area
  - Total: 9.15 km^{2} (3.53 sq mi)
- Elevation: 480 m (1,570 ft)

Population (2025)
  - Total: 8
  - Density: 0.87/km^{2} (2.3/sq mi)
- Demonym(s): Illanero, ra
- Time zone: UTC+1 (CET)
  - Summer (DST): UTC+2 (CEST)
- Postal code: 45681
- Dialing code: 925

Illán de Vacas is a village and municipality in the province of Toledo, in Castile–La Mancha, Spain. The surface area of the municipality is 9.15 square kilometres (3.53 sq mi), and it has 8 inhabitants as of 2025, making it the 6th least populous municipality in Spain.

The municipality contains a church consecrated to the Assumption of Our Lady (Iglesia de la Asunción de Nuestra Señora).

== Etymology ==
The word Illán derives from the Latin Iulianus. The town's name stems from the worship of San Illán or San Julián ("Saint Julian"). The word de simply means "of". The last word, Vacas, despite its current meaning in Spanish – namely "cows" – apparently has an Arabic origin, deriving from a word Wakka. In a document from the latter half of the 16th century, it says that the town's name is "Vacas", and that a fortunate man named Illán lived there.

== History ==
In the past, the town was tied to Los Cerralbos with its beginnings as a workhouse. Illán de Vacas appears in a 1512 document that indicates that three soldiers were captured here. In the 17th century, this hamlet was repopulated with 37 families. In the mid 19th century, it had 22 houses and the municipal budget rose to 2,200 reales, of which 800 reales were used to pay the secretary.

== Geography ==
Illán de Vacas belongs to the comarca of Torrijos. It is bordered on the north by the municipality of Los Cerralbos, on the northwest by Otero, on the east by Domingo Pérez, on the south by Cebolla and on the west by Lucillos.

The town lies at an elevation of roughly 480 m, and 59 km west of Toledo and 35 km east of Talavera de la Reina, on the railway line between Talavera and Torrijos. It is approximately 95 km southwest of Madrid.

== Demographics ==
As of 2025, the population is 8, of which 62.5% are males, and 37.5% are females. Adults aged 18-64 make up 62.5% of the population, and seniors make up 37.5%.

Illán de Vacas is Spain's 6th least populous municipality, with the population having declined by 92% since 1950 due to rural flight. At one point (1991), it even temporarily became a ghost town.

Historical population

Year	Pop.	±%
1842	75	—
1857	248	+230.7%
1877	96	−61.3%
1887	108	+12.5%
1900	110	+1.9%
1910	109	−0.9%
1920	105	−3.7%
1930	66	−37.1%
1940	113	+71.2%

Year	Pop.	±%
1950	108	−4.4%
1960	98	−9.3%
1970	43	−56.1%
1981	21	−51.2%
1991	0	−100.0%
2001	7	—
2011	1	−85.7%
2021	3	+200.0%

Source: INE

== Politics ==
The mayor of Illán de Vacas is Javier Bollaín Renilla of the Partido Popular since 2023. In the 2004 General Election in Spain, all four votes cast at Illán de Vacas went to the Partido Popular.
