= José Ángel de la Casa =

Spanish journalist (1950–2025)

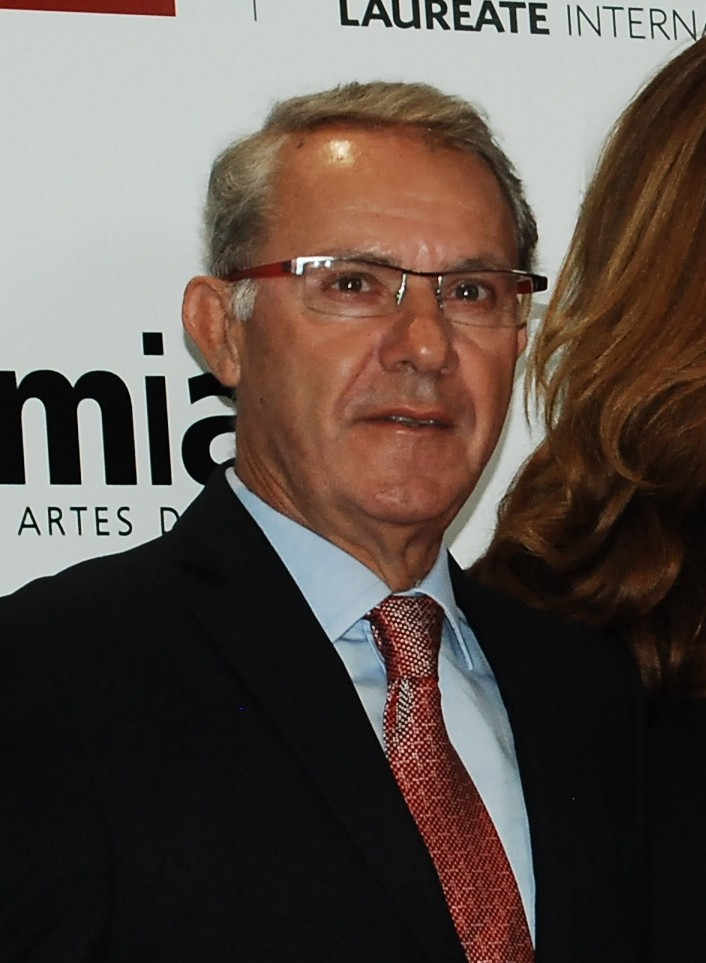
- De la Casa in 2012
- Born: José Ángel de la Casa Tofiño; 1 December 1950; Los Cerralbos, Spain
- Died: 5 May 2025 (aged 74); Majadahonda, Spain
- Occupations: Journalist; sports commentator
- Employer: Castilla-La Mancha Media – RTVE (1973–2007)
- Spouse: Inmaculada Ruiz Adzerias
- Children: 2

José Ángel de la Casa (1 December 1950 – 5 May 2025) was a Spanish sports journalist known for his extensive career in radio and television broadcasting, particularly as a commentator for football matches and other major sporting events.

== Professional career ==
De la Casa graduated in journalism from the Faculty of Information Sciences at the Complutense University of Madrid. In 1973, he joined Radio Nacional de España (RNE) and began working in the Sports department of Radio Peninsular in October of the same year.

In January 1974, he moved to the sports section of RNE, contributing to programs such as Radiogaceta de los deportes and Diarios hablados. In December 1976, he joined TVE, where he worked as a reporter on shows like Polideportivo (until 1981), Tiempo y marca (1981–1983), and Estudio estadio, which he hosted solo from 1988 to 1990 and later directed from 1994 to 1996.

On 14 November 1979, he debuted as a live commentator for Spain national football team matches, starting with the Spain-Denmark game. Over 27 years, he narrated 290 matches, including the historic Spain-Malta game on 21 December 1983. He also covered six Olympic Games (1984–2004), six FIFA World Cups (1978–1998), and numerous UEFA European Championships.

Between May 1996 and January 2005, and again from June 2006 to April 2007, he served as Director of Sports Program Production at TVE. He retired in 2007 following a workforce reduction at the network, with his final broadcast being the Spain-Iceland match, a qualifier for the 2008 UEFA European Championship.

After retirement, he narrated UEFA Champions League matches on CMM TV, the regional channel of Castilla-La Mancha, and collaborated with La 7 and esRadio.

In July 2009, he became a technical advisor for UCAM Murcia Basketball Club.

== Political career ==
After retiring, De la Casa returned to his hometown of Los Cerralbos (Toledo), where he served as deputy mayor until 2019 and as a councilor until 2023 for the Spanish Socialist Workers' Party (PSOE).

== Personal life and death ==
De la Casa was married to Canal Sur journalist Inmaculada Ruiz Adzerias. He had two sons from a previous relationship: Juan Manuel, who works in the press office of Real Madrid Femenino, and Javier, a commentator for Movistar Plus+.

In 2014, he revealed that he had been diagnosed with Parkinson's disease in 2004. He became an activist in raising awareness about the disease, which had also affected his father. He had previously overcome prostate cancer.

Casa died at the Puerta de Hierro University Hospital in Majadahonda, Madrid, on 5 May 2025. He was 74.

== Awards ==
- 1998: Ondas National Television Award for Best Professional Work.
- 2006: Silver Medal of the Royal Order of Sports Merit.
- 2009: Lifetime Achievement Award from the Spanish Academy of Television and Audiovisual Arts and Sciences.
- 2018: Gold Medal of Castilla-La Mancha from the Regional Government of Castilla-La Mancha.
