= Demetrio Jiménez Sánchez-Mariscal =

Spanish-born Argentine Roman Catholic bishop (1963–2019)

Demetrio Jiménez Sánchez-Mariscal OSA
- Prelate of Cafayate
- Church: Catholic Church
- See: Territorial Prelature of Cafayate
- In office: 10 February 2014 – 23 August 2019
- Predecessor: Mariano Moreno García
- Successor: Darío Rubén Quintana

Orders
- Ordination: 23 June 1988 by Nicolás Antonio Castellanos Franco
- Consecration: 10 May 2014 by Mariano Moreno García

Personal details
- Born: José Demetrio Jiménez Sánchez-Mariscal; 8 October 1963 Los Cerralbos, Province of Toledo, Spanish State
- Died: 23 October 2019 (aged 56) Buenos Aires, Argentina

José Demetrio Jiménez Sánchez-Mariscal (8 October 1963 – 23 October 2019) was an Argentine Roman Catholic bishop.

Jiménez-Mariscal was born in the Spanish municipality of Los Cerralbos. He professed as a Member of Order of St. Augustine on 6 September 1981, aged 17. On 11 October 1986, he made solemn vows as a Member of the Order of St. Augustine. He was ordained to the priesthood on 23 June 1988. He served as bishop of the Roman Catholic Territorial Prelature of Cafayate, Argentina from 2014 until his death in 2019.
