= Mariano Moreno García =

Spanish priest (1938–2023)

His Excellency Mariano Anastasio Moreno García
- Prelate Emeritus of Cafayate
- Metropolis: Salta
- Appointed: 17 November 2007
- Term ended: 10 February 2014
- Predecessor: Cipriano García Fernández
- Successor: Demetrio Jiménez Sánchez-Mariscal

Orders
- Ordination: 9 July 1964 by Vicente Enrique y Tarancón
- Consecration: 9 March 2008 by Adriano Bernardini

Personal details
- Born: 7 September 1938 Milagro, Spain
- Died: 16 August 2023 (aged 84) Madrid, Spain

Mariano Anastasio Moreno García, OSA, (7 September 1938 – 16 August 2023) was a Spanish Roman Catholic prelate. He was bishop of Cafayate from 2008 to 2014.

Moreno Garcia was born in Milagro, Navarre on 7 September 1938. He died in Madrid on 16 August 2023 at the age of 84.

Catholic Church titles
Preceded by Cipriano García Fernández	Prelate of Cafayate; 2007–2014	Succeeded by Demetrio Jiménez Sánchez-Mariscal
