= Cipriano García Fernández =

Spanish-born Argentine Roman Catholic Prelate (1931–2025)

His Excellency Cipriano García Fernández
- Prelate Emeritus of Cafayate
- Archdiocese: Salta
- Appointed: 28 May 1991
- Term ended: 26 January 2007
- Predecessor: Diego Gutiérrez Pedraza
- Successor: Mariano Moreno García

Orders
- Ordination: 15 July 1956
- Consecration: 11 August 1991 by Moisés Julio Blanchoud

Personal details
- Born: 23 December 1931 Santibáñez de Tera, Spain
- Died: 13 August 2025 (aged 93) Madrid, Spain
- Motto: Me desgastaré por vuestras almas
- Coat of arms

Styles of Cipriano García Fernández
- Reference style: His Excellency; The Most Reverend
- Spoken style: Your Excellency
- Religious style: Prelate

Cipriano García Fernández (23 December 1931 – 13 August 2025) was a Spanish Roman Catholic prelate.

== Life and work ==
García Fernández joined the Augustinian Order and was ordained a priest on 15 July 1956.

Pope John Paul II appointed him prelate of Cafayate, Argentina on 28 May 1991. The Archbishop of Salta, Moisés Julio Blanchoud, consecrated him bishop on 11 August of the same year; Co-consecrators were Archbishop Ubaldo Calabresi, Apostolic Nuncio to Argentina, and Elmer Osmar Ramón Miani, Bishop of Catamarca. On 26 January 2007, Pope Benedict XVI accepted his resignation on grounds of age.

García Fernández died on 13 August 2025, at the age of 93.

Catholic Church titles
Preceded by Diego Gutiérrez Pedraza	Prelate of Cafayete; 1991–2007	Succeeded by Mariano Moreno García
