= Roman Catholic Territorial Prelature of Cafayate =

Catholic particular church territory

Territorial Prelature of Cafayate Territorialis Praelatura Cafayatensis Prelatura Territorial de Cafayate

Catholic
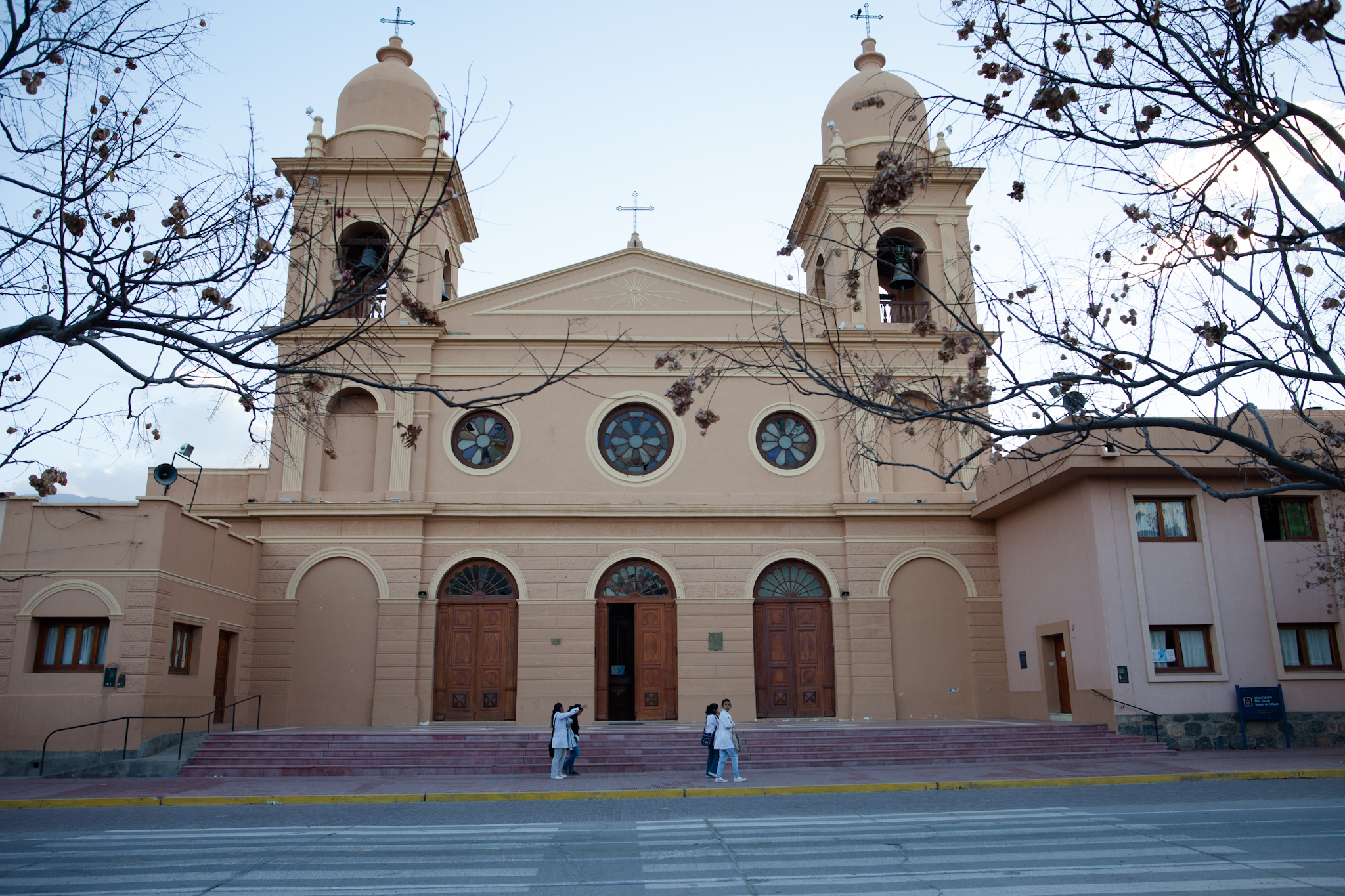
- Cathedral of Our Lady of the Rosary

Location
- Country: Argentina
- Ecclesiastical province: Salta
- Metropolitan: Salta

Statistics
- Area: 40,000 km^{2} (15,000 sq mi)
- Population: Total; Catholics: (as of 2004); 54,625; 53,194 (97.4%)
- Parishes: 7

Information
- Denomination: Roman Catholic
- Rite: Roman Rite
- Established: 8 September 1969 (220 years ago)
- Cathedral: Cathedral of Our Lady of the Rosary in Cafayate

Current leadership
- Pope: Leo XIV
- Prelate: Darío Rubén Quintana Muñiz, O.A.R.
- Metropolitan Archbishop: Mario Antonio Cargnello

The Roman Catholic Territorial Prelature of Cafayate (Latin: Praelatura Territorialis Cafayatensis) is in Argentina and is a suffragan of the Archdiocese of Salta.

== History ==
On 8 September 1969, Pope Paul VI established the Territorial Prelature of Cafayate from territory taken from the Diocese of Catamarca and the Archdiocese of Salta.

== Ordinaries ==
- Diego Gutiérrez Pedraza, O.S.A. (1973–1990)
- Cipriano García Fernández, O.S.A. (1991–2007)
- Mariano Moreno García, O.S.A. (2007–2014)
- José Demetrio Jiménez Sánchez-Mariscal, O.S.A. (2014–2019)
- Darío Rubén Quintana Muñiz, O.A.R. (2022–present)
