= Lucillos =

- Municipality
- Flag Coat of arms

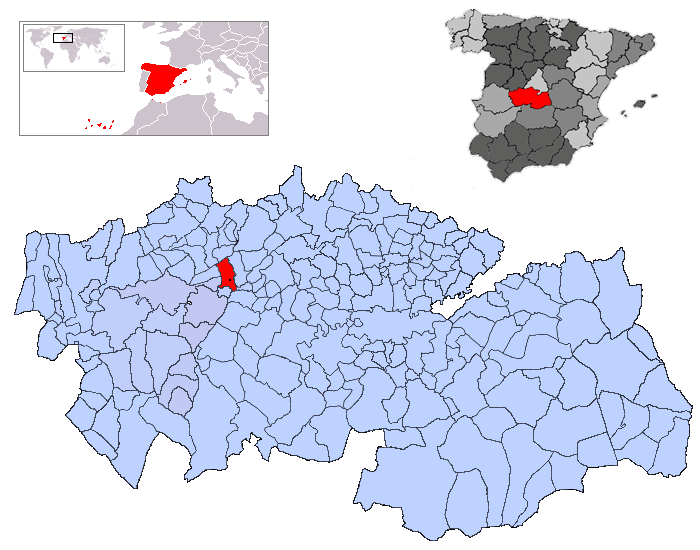

- Location in Spain
- Coordinates: 39°59′12″N 4°36′45″W
- Country: Spain
- Autonomous community: Castile-La Mancha
- Province: Toledo
- Comarca: Torrijos
- Judicial district: Talavera de la Reina
- Founded: Ver texto

Government
  - Alcalde: Saturnino de la Llave García (2007)

Area
  - Total: 40 km^{2} (15 sq mi)
- Elevation: 480 m (1,570 ft)

Population (2025-01-01)
  - Total: 666
  - Density: 17/km^{2} (43/sq mi)
- Demonym(s): Lucillano, na
- Time zone: UTC+1 (CET)
  - Summer (DST): UTC+2 (CEST)
- Postal code: 45684
- Dialing code: 925

Lucillos is a Spanish municipality of Toledo province, in the autonomous community of Castile-La Mancha. Its population is 488 and its surface is 41 km², with a density of 11.9 people/km².

The mayor of Lucillos is Mr. José-Julián Herrera Gómez, of the ruling Partido Socialista Obrero. The Partido Socialista Obrero has 4 municipal councillors while the Partido Popular has 3. In the municipal elections of 2003 both parties got 169 votes in this municipality.

In the 2004 Spanish General Election the Partido Popular got 57.1% of the vote in Lucillos, the Partido Socialista Obrero got 41.8% and Izquierda Unida got .6%.
