= Wildwood Discovery Park =

Wildwood Trust
- One of the Arctic Foxes living at Wildwood Kent
- Interactive map of Wildwood Trust
- 51°19′52″N 1°7′9″E
- Date opened: 1999
- Location: South East Kent, England
- No. of species: 50+
- Annual visitors: 100,000
- Website: www.wildwoodtrust.org

Wildwood Trust (formerly known as Wildwood Discovery Park) is a woodland discovery park in Herne. It features over fifty species of native British animals and located along the main road A291 between Herne Bay and Canterbury. They have a second site, Wildwood Devon, located on Escot Park in Ottery St Mary, Devon. They are a smaller collection housing 20 native British species. Wildwood Trust is a Registered Charity in England, No 1093702, whose aim is to save British Wildlife and reintroduce animals such as European beaver, wild boar, European bison and red-billed chough.

== History ==
Wildwood Trust was established in 2002 by Kenneth Henry West, though the wildlife centre was a few years earlier in 1999. However, it can be traced back to the 1970’s where it was a small park and nature reserve. The trust has acquired a second site based at Escot Park in Devon and first opened in 2015.

Following the death of Kenneth West in 2017, Paul Whitfield, ex Chairman of the Trustees, was appointed to take over the running of the Trust as its Director General. The Trust introduced European bison to Kent in 2022 and Red-Billed Chough in 2023.

On Wednesday, 25 March 2026, a wolf pack consisting of the adult pair Odin and Nuna and their offspring Minimus, Tiberius and Maximus was euthanised in the morning due to aggressive behaviour within the pack, which resulted in multiple life-threatening injuries.

== Kent site ==
Wildwood Trust

Their Kent-based site is 40 acres of woodlands and boosts 50 different native british species at the park. The area is part of the larger West Blean woods. The Management of the park space is handled by employees, volunteers and trainees. The park is found along A291 Road, nestled between Herne Bay and Canterbury. Parking is free of charge, however, parking for coach and mini-buses is limited during peak seasons.

Dogs are not allowed in the park, which includes guide dogs due to the free roaming species found in the park. The ticket room is a single story room and attached is the gift shop. The gift shop contains wildlife and conservation themed items on display. These products range from books, keychains, magnets, plush animals and artisan products.

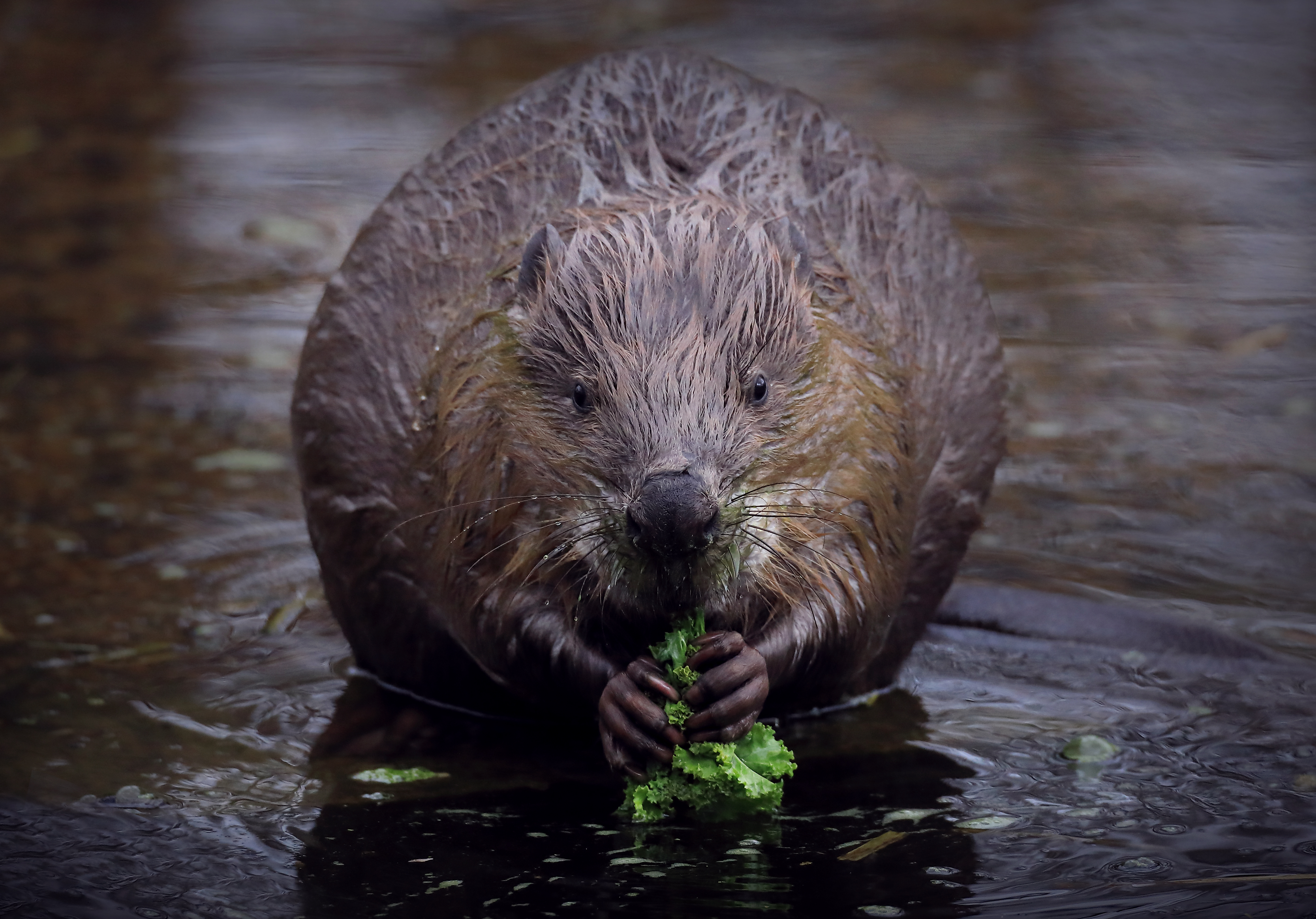
Beaver at Wildwood Trust

The woodland cafe offers hot, cold, snacks and baked goods. The cafe, alongside the office and education centers is heated with log burners. Near the cafe is the playground, which was first built in 2011. The area is accessed by gate, and fences divide a larger area for older children and a smaller space for younger.

In the bigger space, there are wooden forts, short zip-lines and the Tree Top Drop Slide. The drop slide is one the tallest in kent, and is a modern version of a victorian design of 26 feet. The slide is made of a linoleum materiel, and is typically open during weekends and holidays.

The winding paths guide visitors around the park. The area is mostly accessible and has ramps except for the rope bridge at the bear enclosure. The trail consists of small gravel stones on compacted mud and the path can narrow to 2 meter in some spots, the windows for the enclosures are low viewing windows. Due to the landscape, the pathways may be uneven, muddy and maybe have exposed tree roots.

== Conservation ==
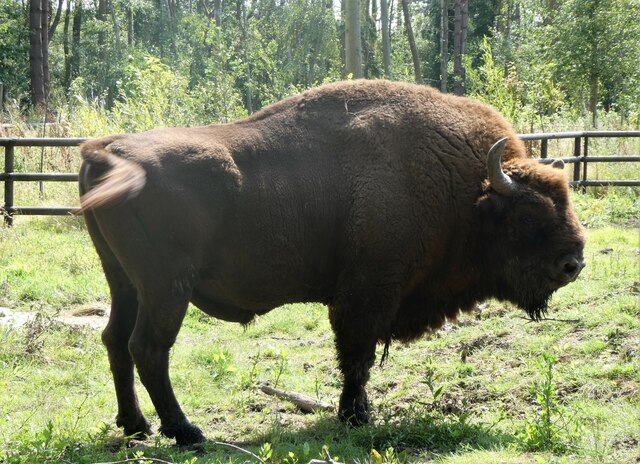
Bison, Wildwood Trust

Hazel Dormouse

There has been a reintroduction of captive-bred hazel dormice. 2024 saw the species released into Bedfordshire as part of ongoing efforts to restore the population that was ‘on the brink.’ In 2025, as part of the dormouse project, wildwood supported the reintroduction of hazel dormice in Bristol, where they had become locally extinct. In 2026, dormice were released into Leicestershire woods to boost numbers.

European Bison

They have been awarded funding from The Postcode Lottery to re-introduce Bison into Blean Woods, a project jointly run with Kent Wildlife Trust. The Bison reintroduction was first established in 2019, and the first herd released in 2022. By 2024, two calves were born. In 2026, five menbers of this bison population was introduced into Cumbria.
