= Ham Fen =

Coordinates: 51.249°N 1.336°E

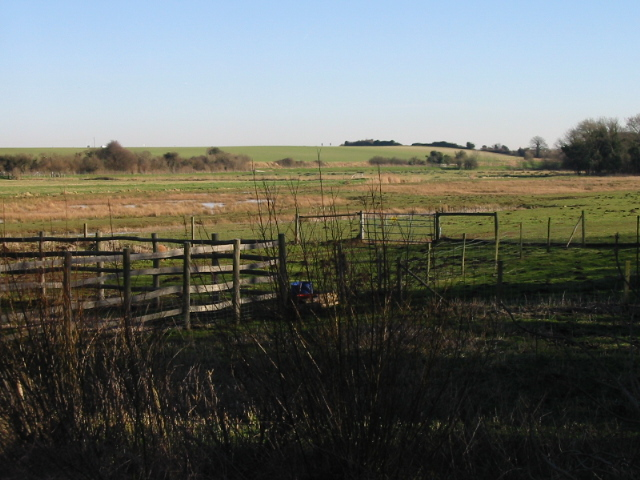
- Interactive map of Ham Fen
- Type: Nature reserve
- Location: Sandwich, Kent
- OS grid: TR329553
- Area: 30 hectares (74 acres)

Ham Fen is a 133-acre (54-hectare) nature reserve south of Sandwich in Kent, managed by Kent Wildlife Trust.

This old fenland site has wet grassland with deep mires, dykes and ditches, and is the last surviving ancient fen habitat in South East England. The reserve was established in 1991. Considerable damage was caused by two major periods of land drainage in the 18th century and early 1980s, which led to significant habitat deterioration and loss of wetland species.

Work to repair the natural environment includes the successful reintroduction of Eurasian beavers to the site, which first took place in 2002. The beavers were initially restricted to an enclosure within the reserve: in 2026, they were released from the enclosure, giving them access to the entire reserve.

The site is not open to the public: however, Kent Wildlife Trust runs group visits and a programme of guided walks.
