= Voronezh Nature Reserve =

Strict nature reserve in Lipetsk and Voronezh Oblasts, Russia

Voronezh Nature Reserve named after V. M. Peskov
- Russian: Воронежский заповедник
- IUCN category Ia (strict nature reserve)
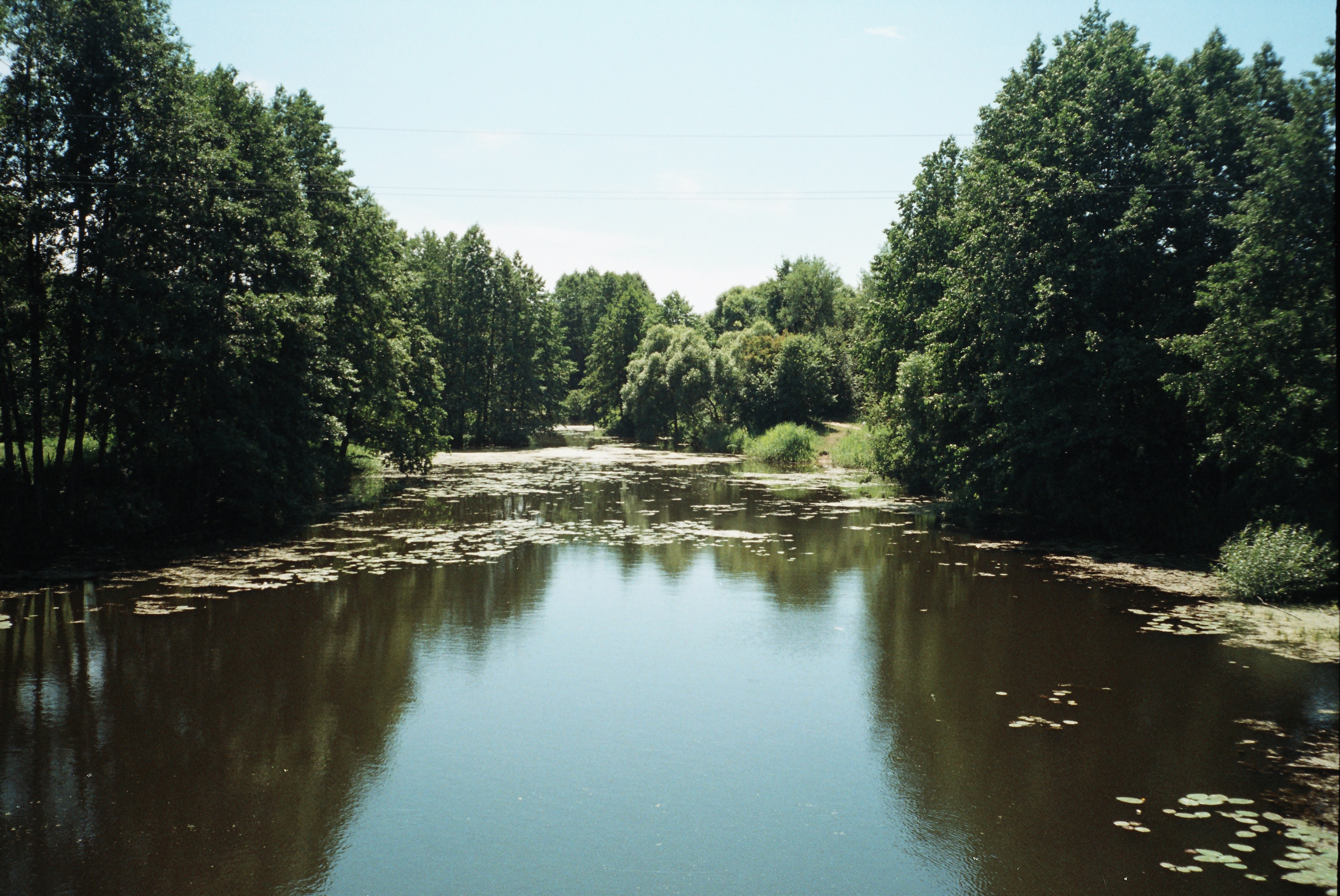
- Usmanka River, Voronezh Nature Reserve

- Location within Russia
- Location: Voronezh Oblast and Lipetsk Oblast
- Nearest city: TBD
- Coordinates: 51°44′8″N 39°34′9″E
- Area: 31,053 hectares (76,734 acres; 120 sq mi)
- Established: 1927
- Governing body: Ministry of Natural Resources and Environment (Russia)
- Website: http://zapovednik-vrn.ru/

Voronezh Nature Reserve (Russian: Воронежский заповедник; Voronezhsky Zapovednik) is a Russian 'zapovednik' (strict ecological reserve) located 40 km north of the city Voronezh and 500 km south of Moscow. One of the oldest nature reserves in Russia, Voronezh was the world's first experimental beaver nursery for breeding and studying the beaver. The reserve is situated in the Usmansky District of Voronezh Oblast, and in Lipetsk Oblast. It is part of a UNESCO-MAB (Man and Biosphere) Biosphere Reserve. Its official name as of 2013 is "Voronezh Peskov Nature Reserve" in honor of journalist and writer Vasily Peskov. The reserve was created in 1927, and covers an area of 31,053 ha (119.90 sq mi).

== Topography ==
Voronezh Reserve is situated in the northern part of the Usman Forest, an isolated forest surrounded by steppes in the western outskirts of the lowland plains of the Oka and Don River plains. The forest was formed on the sandy terraces of the left bank of the Voronezh River. The terrain is a rolling plain, flattening east to west. Altitudes range from a high of 165–169 m at the watershed of Voronezh-Usmanka and Usmanka-Baygora, to a low of 90 m in the floodplain areas of the Voronezh. Only 4 km of the Voronezh river itself runs through the reserve; the Usman river is more extensive. It is a typical forest river connecting a chain of lakes, reaching a width of 60 m and a depth of 3–4 meters. The floodplain is low and marshy. The territory belongs to the "Levoberezhny pridolinno" terraced area subzone that is typical of the forest-steppe province of the Oka–Don Lowland.

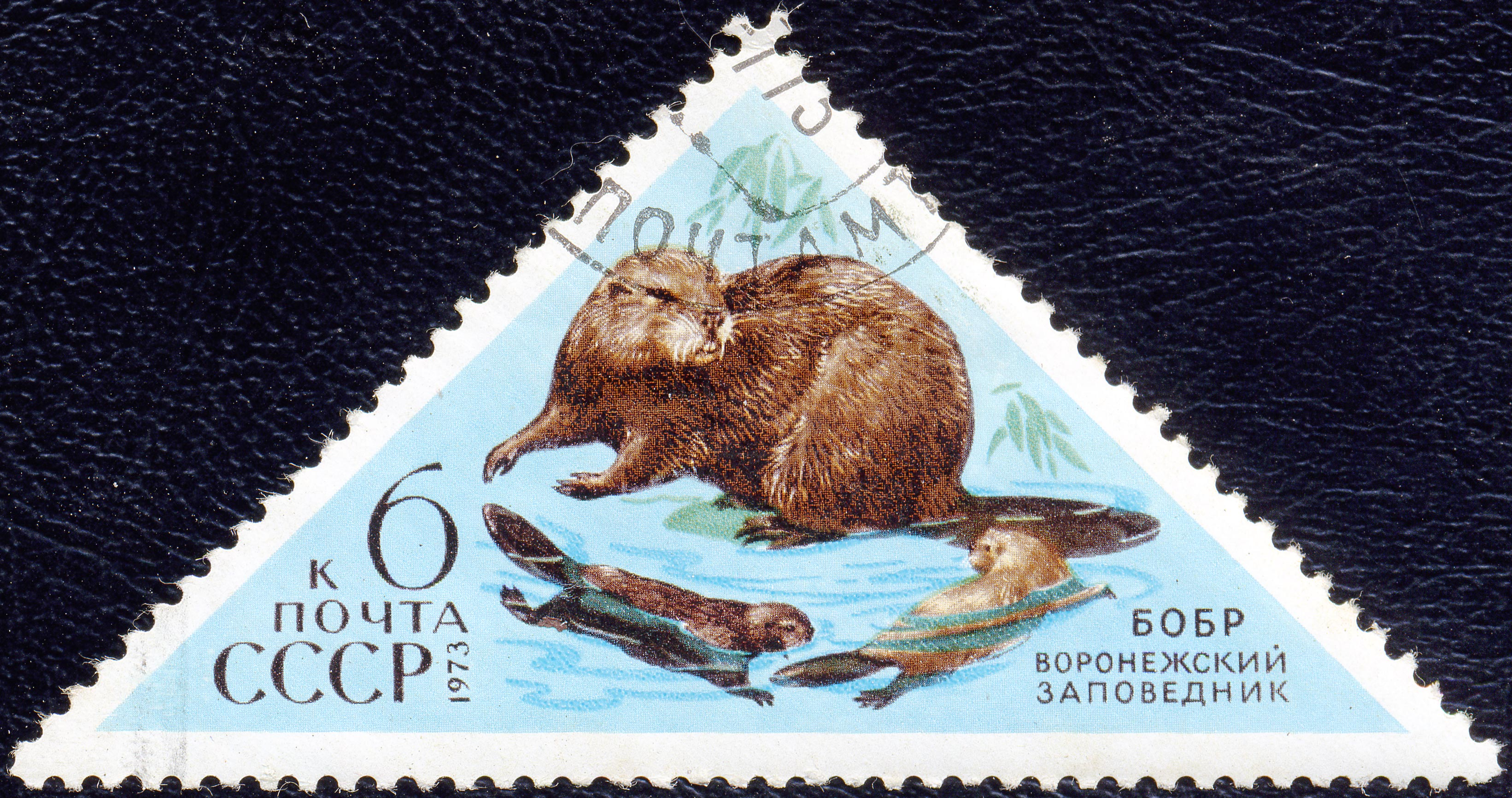
1973 Stamp, Soviet Union, highlighting the Voronezh Reserve and the beavers for which it is known.

== Ecoregion and climate ==
Voronezh is located in the East European forest steppe ecoregion, a transition zone between the broadleaf forests of the north and the grasslands to the south. This ecoregion is characterized by a mosaic of forests, steppe, and riverine wetlands.

The climate of Voronezh is Humid continental climate, warm summer (Köppen climate classification (Dfb)). This climate is characterized by large swings in temperature, both diurnally and seasonally, with mild summers and cold, snowy winters.

== Flora and fauna ==
The Usman Forest is representative of pine forests growing on sandy deposits along the left bank of the rivers Don and Voronezh. The tree species in the reserve are a combination of pine (32.3% of the total), broad-leaved (mostly oak) (29.3%), aspen (19.3%), birch (5.7%), and black alder (5.2%). There is a problem in the reserve with invasive species from the Americas - particularly the Canadian waterweed, the American maple, and the Saskatoon pigweed. The reserve has recorded over 200 species of plants considered medicinal by local cultures. Over 1,000 species of plants have been recorded in total, and 60 species of mammals.

The Voronezh Nature Reserve played an important role in the reintroduction of beavers to Europe. From 1934 to 1977, approximately 3,000 Eurasian Beavers from Voronezh were reintroduced to 52 regions of the USSR, from Poland to Mongolia.

== Ecotourism ==
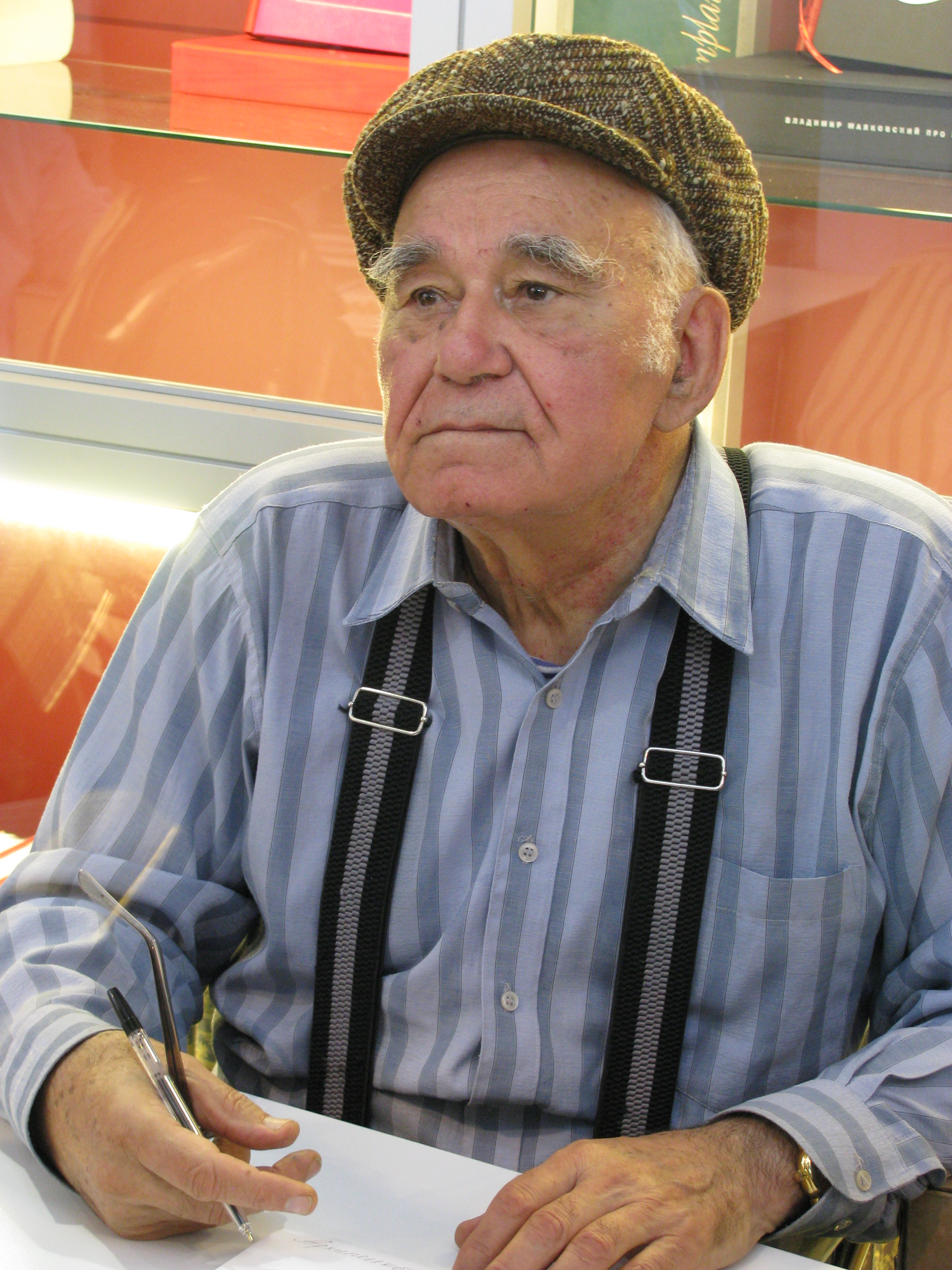
Vasily Peskov, who hosted from 1975 to 1990 the Soviet TV show "In the World of Animals", and for whom the reserve is named.

Ecotourism is a stated goal of the reserve, in addition to preservation of nature and scientific study. There is a nature museum (four large halls, including one devoted to the life of the beaver), and a visitor center open to the public. There is also a working beaver nursery open to the public ("Beaver Town"), as well as a rope park, and an educational ecological trail. As a strict nature reserve, most of the Voronezh Reserve is normally closed to the general public, however, scientists and those with 'environmental education' purposes can make arrangements with park management for visits. The managers generally require permits to be obtained in advance. There is also a museum devoted to Vasily Peskov, the official namesake of the reserve.

== See also ==
- List of Russian Nature Reserves (class 1a 'zapovedniks')
- National parks of Russia
- Protected areas of Russia
