= Milagro, Navarre =

Municipality of Navarre, Spain

Coordinates: 42°15′N 1°46′W

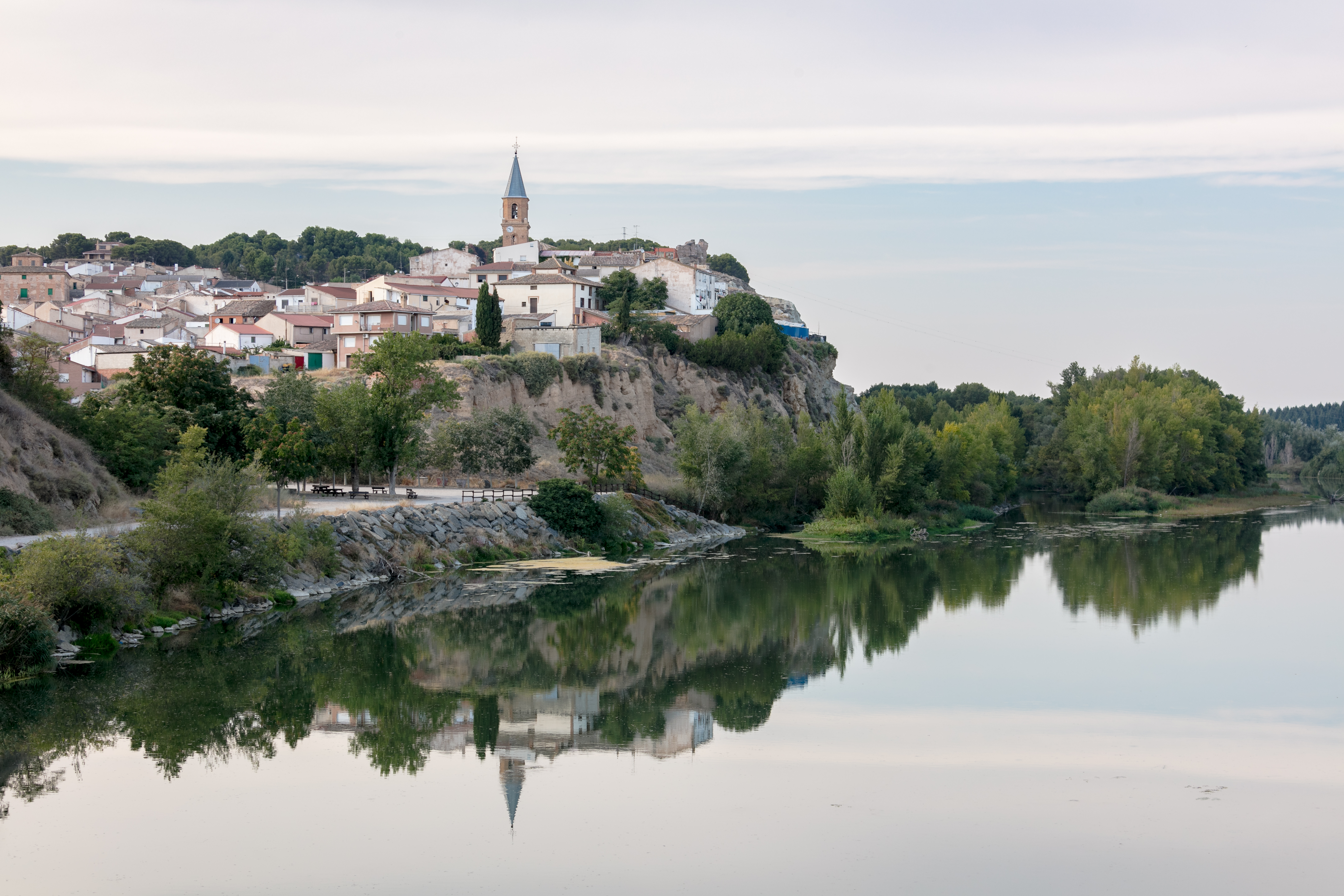

Milagro is a town and municipality located in the province and autonomous community of Navarre, northern Spain.
