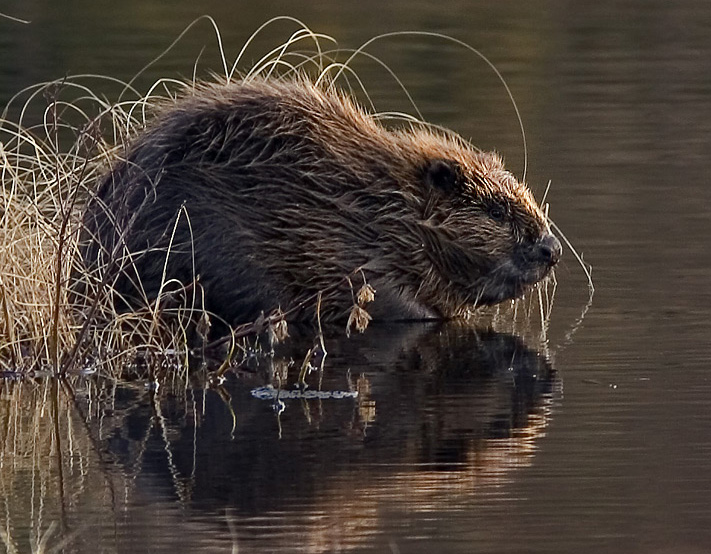
- A Eurasian beaver in Norway

Conservation status
- Least Concern (IUCN 3.1)

Scientific classification
- Kingdom: Animalia
- Phylum: Chordata
- Class: Mammalia
- Order: Rodentia
- Family: Castoridae
- Genus: Castor
- Species: C. fiber

Binomial name
- Castor fiber Linnaeus, 1758
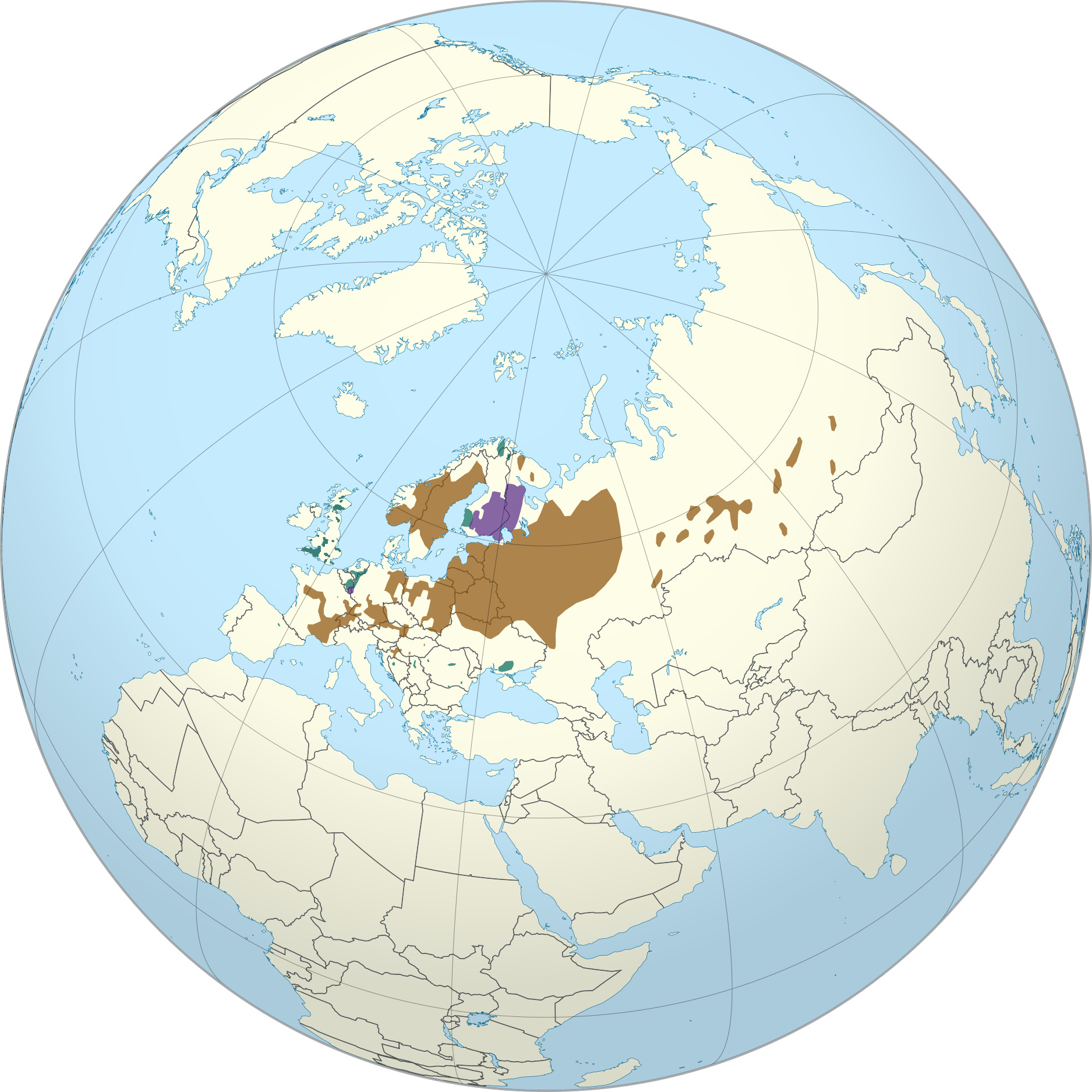
- Castor fiber: Extant (resident) Castor fiber: Extant & Introduced (resident) Castor canadensis: Extant & Introduced (resident)

= Eurasian beaver =

Species of beaver

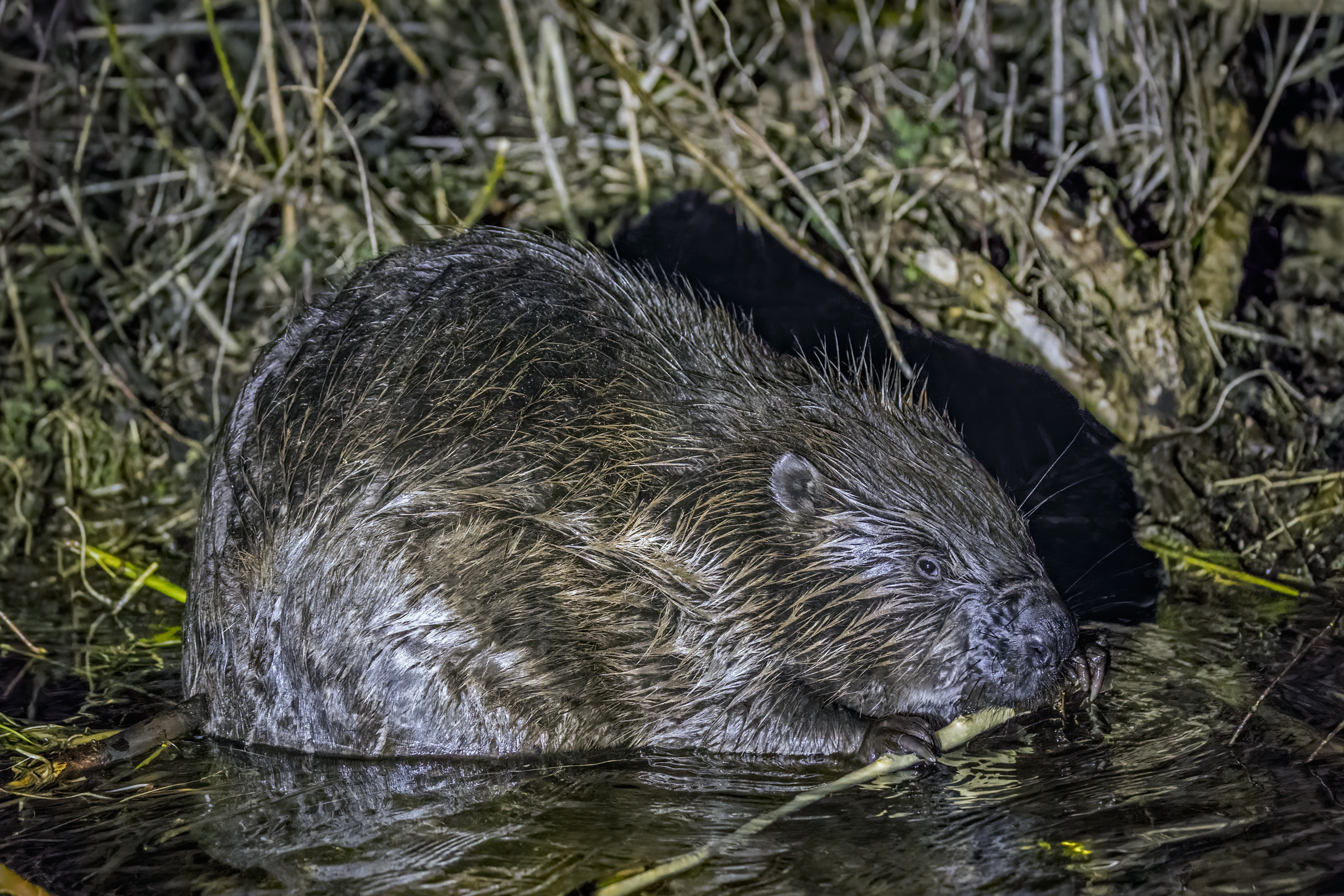
in the Narew River, Poland

The Eurasian beaver (Castor fiber) or European beaver is a species of beaver widespread across Eurasia, with a rapidly increasing population of 1.5 million in 2020. The Eurasian beaver was hunted to near-extinction for both its fur and castoreum, with only about 1,200 beavers in eight relict populations from France to Mongolia in the early 20th century. It has since been reintroduced into much of its former range and now lives from Western, Southern, Central and Eastern Europe, Scandinavia, Russia through China and Mongolia, with about half the population in Russia. It is listed as least concern on the IUCN Red List.

== Taxonomy ==
Castor fiber was the scientific name used by Carl Linnaeus in 1758, who described the beaver in his work Systema Naturae. Between 1792 and 1997, several Eurasian beaver zoological specimens were described and proposed as subspecies, including:

- C. f. albus and C. f. solitarius by Robert Kerr in 1792
- C. f. fulvus and C. f. variegatus by Johann Matthäus Bechstein in 1801
- C. f. galliae by Étienne Geoffroy Saint-Hilaire in 1803
- C. f. flavus, C. f. varius and C. f. niger by Anselme Gaëtan Desmarest in 1822
- C. f. gallicus Johann Baptist Fischer in 1829
- C. f. proprius by Gustaf Johan Billberg in 1833
- C. f. albicus, C. f. balticus and C. f. vistulanus by Paul Matschie in 1907
- C. f. birulai and C. f. pohlei by Serebrennikov in 1929
- C. f. tuvinicus by Lavrov in 1969
- C. f. belarusicus and C. f. osteuropaeus by Lavrov in 1974
- C. f. belorussicus and C. f. orientoeuropaeus by Lavrov in 1981
- C. f. bielorussieus by Lavrov in 1983
- C. f. introductus by Saveljev in 1997

These descriptions were largely based on very small differences in fur colour and cranial morphology, none of which warrant a subspecific distinction. In 2005, analysis of mitochondrial DNA of Eurasian beaver samples showed that only two evolutionarily significant units exist: a western phylogroup in Western and Central Europe, and an eastern phylogroup in the region east of the Oder and Vistula rivers. The eastern phylogroup is genetically more diverse, but still at a degree below thresholds considered sufficient for subspecific differentiation.

== Description ==
The Eurasian beaver's fur colour varies between regions. Light, chestnut-rust is the dominant colour in Belarus. In Russia's Sozh River basin, it is predominantly blackish brown, while in the Voronezh Nature Reserve beavers are both brown and blackish-brown.

The Eurasian beaver is one of the largest living rodent species and the largest rodent native to Eurasia. Its head-to-body length is 80–100 cm (31–39 in) with a 25–50 cm (9.8–19.7 in) long tail length. It weighs around 11–30 kg (24–66 lb). By the average weights known, it appears to be the world's second heaviest rodent after the capybara, and is slightly larger and heavier than the North American beaver. One exceptionally large recorded specimen weighed 31.7 kg (70 lb), but it is reportedly possible for the species to exceptionally exceed 40 kg (88 lb).

=== Differences from North American beaver ===
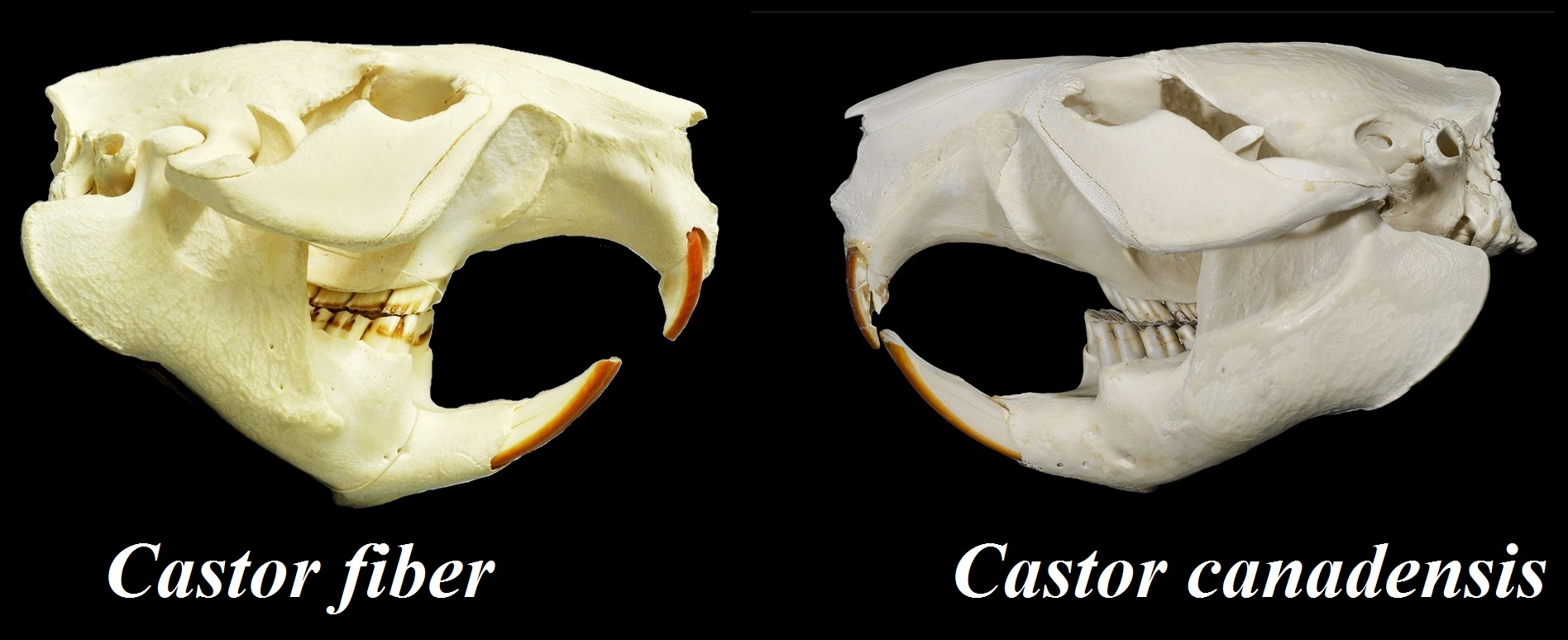
Skulls of a European and North American beaver

Although the Eurasian beaver appears superficially similar to the North American beaver, there are several important differences, chief among these being that the North American beaver has 40 chromosomes, while the Eurasian beaver has 48. The two species are not genetically compatible: the result of over 27 attempts in Russia to hybridise the two species was just one stillborn kit, bred from the pairing of a male North American beaver and a female Eurasian beaver. The difference in chromosome count makes interspecific breeding unlikely in areas where the two species' ranges overlap.

==== Fur ====
The guard hairs of the Eurasian beaver have longer hollow medullae at their tips. There is also a difference in the frequency of fur colours: 66% of Eurasian beavers overall have beige or pale brown fur, 20% have reddish brown, nearly 8% are brown, and only 4% have blackish coats; among North American beavers, 50% have pale brown fur, 25% are reddish brown, 20% are brown, and 6% are blackish.

== Distribution and habitat ==
The Eurasian beaver is recovering from near extinction, after depredation by humans for its fur and for castoreum, a secretion of its scent gland believed to have medicinal properties. The estimated population was only 1,200 by the early 20th century. In many European countries, the Eurasian beaver became extirpated, but reintroduction and protection programmes led to gradual recovery so that by 2020, the population was at least 1.5 million. It likely survived east of the Ural Mountains from a 19th-century population as low as 300 animals. Factors contributing to their survival include their ability to maintain sufficient genetic diversity to recover from a population as low as three individuals, and that beavers are monogamous and select mates that are genetically different from themselves. About 83% of Eurasian beavers live in the former Soviet Union due to reintroductions.

=== Continental Europe ===
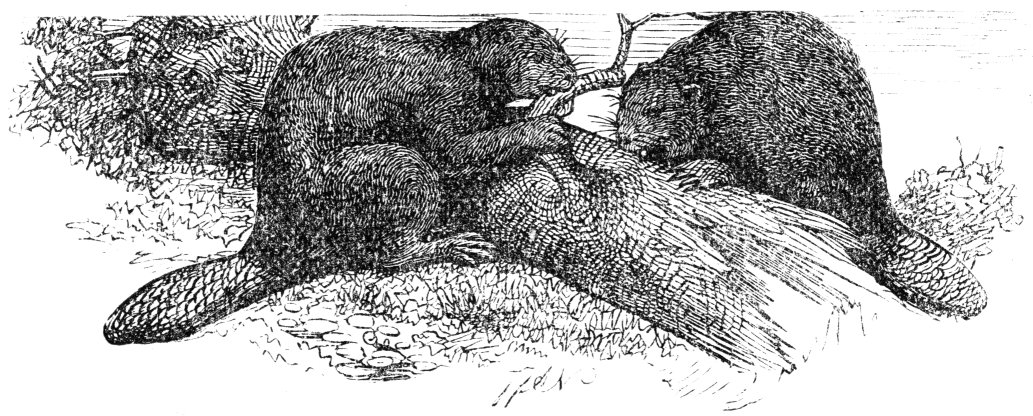
Eurasian beaver

The Eurasian beaver lives in almost all countries in continental Europe, from Spain and France in the west, to Russia and Moldova in the east, and Montenegro, Serbia and Bulgaria in the southeast. In 2022 and again in 2025 beaver signs were found and documented in Portugal, in regions near the border with Spain. The only significant areas where it has no known population are the southern Balkans: Albania, Kosovo, Northern Macedonia, Greece and European Turkey. It is also not known to be present in the microstates of Andorra, Monaco, San Marino and Vatican City.

In Spain, the beaver was extirpated in the 17th century. In 2003, 18 beavers were unofficially released. Current range includes the Ebro river in La Rioja, Navarre, and province of Zaragoza; the Zadorra river up to Vitoria-Gasteiz, the Arga river up to Pamplona, the Huerva river up to Mezalocha, and the Jalón river into the province of Soria. In November 2021, a young beaver was photographed for the first time outside the Ebro basin, in the upper Douro river in Soria. In 2020, the population was estimated to be more than 1,000. In June 2024, a beaver was sighted at the Tagus river basin near Zorita de los Canes.

In Portugal, the beaver was distributed mostly in the main river basins north of the Tagus River, until it was extirpated around 1450. In 2023, signs of beaver activity were found on the Douro river about 5 km from the Spanish border. In 2025, it was confirmed that the beaver had returned to Portugal, at the Douro International Park.

In France, the Eurasian beaver was almost extirpated by the late 19th century, with only a small population of about 100 individuals surviving in the lower Rhône valley. Following protection measures in 1968 and 26 reintroduction projects, it re-colonised the Rhône river and its tributaries, including the Saône, and other river systems such as Loire, Moselle, Tarn and Seine. In 2011, the French beaver population was estimated at 14,000 individuals living along 10,500 km (6,500 mi) of watercourses. In 2022, its range was estimated to have increased to 17,000 km (11,000 mi) of watercourses.

In the Netherlands, beavers were completely extirpated by 1826. Due to official reintroductions since 1988, beavers are now found in most parts of the country, in particular the south, centre and north-west. The population was around 3500 in 2019.

In Belgium the beaver was extirpated in 1848. Current populations are descendants of animals released in the Ardennes in 1998–2000 and in Flanders in 2003. Some beavers also arrived in Flanders from the Netherlands in 2003. In 2018, the population was 2,200–2,400, with Flanders having around 400 beavers and Wallonia 1,800–2,000 beavers.

In Germany, around 200 Eurasian beavers survived at the end of the 19th century in the Elbe river system in Saxony, Saxony-Anhalt and Brandenburg. Official reintroduction programs, in particular in Bavaria, resulted in major population growth and beavers are now found throughout most of eastern and southern Germany, with strongly established disjunct populations in the west. By 2019, beavers numbered above 40,000, and appear in many urban areas.

In Poland, as of 2014, the beaver population had grown to 100,000 individuals.

In Switzerland, the Eurasian beaver was hunted to extirpation in the early 19th century. Between 1956 and 1977, 141 individuals from France, Russia and Norway were reintroduced to 30 sites in the Rhône and Rhine catchment areas. As of 2019, Switzerland had an estimated 3,500 beavers (a sharp increase from 1,600 beavers in 2008), with permanent beaver presence along most larger rivers of the Swiss Plateau and the Swiss Alps (with the exception of Ticino).

In Italy, beavers returned in 2018 after an absence of almost 500 years, when they were spotted in the Friuli-Venezia Giulia region. By 2023, beavers were living in different parts of Italy: the north-east, in Friuli-Venezia Giulia and Alto Adige, near the Austrian border; the center of the peninsula in Tuscany, Umbria and Abruzzo; and in the southern regions of Molise and Campania. This fragmentation suggests that, while beavers have naturally crossed the border from Austria following official reintroductions, unofficial releases have taken place in central and southern Italy.

In Romania, beavers became extinct in 1824, but were reintroduced in 1998 along the Olt River, spreading to other rivers in Covasna County. In 2014, the animals were confirmed to have reached the Danube Delta.

In Russia, by 1917, beaver populations remained in four isolated territories: in the Dnieper basin; in the Don basin; in the northern Urals and in the upper reaches of the Yenisei along the Azas river. The total number of beavers did not exceed 900 heads. Beaver hunting was banned in 1922. In 1923, a hunting reserve was organised in the Voronezh region along the Usman river, which in 1927 was transformed into the Voronezh State Reserve. At the same time, two more such reserves were created: Berezinsky and Kondo-Sosvinsky. 1927 also included the first attempts to reintroduce beavers in other areas. As a result, by the end of the 1960s, the beaver's range in the Soviet Union was almost as large as in the 17th century. The beavers' growing numbers made commercial capture possible again. In 2016, there were an estimated 661,000 beavers in Russia; in 2019, the estimate was 774,600.

In the lands that made up the Soviet Union, almost 17,000 beavers were translocated from 1927 to 2004. Some 5,000 of these went to Ukraine, Belarus, the Baltic States and Kazakhstan.

In Bulgaria, fossil, subfossil and subrecent remains have been found in 43 localities along 28 lowland rivers, from Struma and Maritsa in the south till the Danube in the north, while the last finds from Nicopolis ad Istrum date to the 1750–1850 period. In 2021, the Eurasian beaver was confirmed to have returned to Bulgaria.

In Serbia, beavers were mostly extinct by the 1870s, with the last specimens being seen around 1900–1902. In 2004, 31 beavers were reintroduced in the Zasavica reserve by the Biology Faculty of the Belgrade University in collaboration with the Bavarian Science Society, and 45 beavers were released in the Obedska bara reserve. They spread quickly. By 2020, they had spread 150 km (93 mi) north, west and east, inhabiting rivers in the Sava-Danube system (Drina, Jadar, Great Morava, Tamnava, Tisza, Bega, Timiș, the canal system in Vojvodina), they were found in the capital Belgrade, and had spread to neighbouring Bosnia and Herzegovina.

In 1999, after a beaver was shot in Northern Serbia (Vojvodina, Bačka region) that had dispersed from Hungary's re-established population, a reintroduction program was initiated also in Bosnia and Herzegovina. Between 2005 and 2006, a total of 40 were introduced into the Semešnica and Sokočnica rivers in Bosnia and Herzegovina. Based on a recent study, the current reserve network should be expanded further to assist the colonisation process of the Eurasian beavers to reduce mortality and mitigate potential conflicts with people.

In Croatia, the Eurasian beaver was hunted to extinction by the end of the 19th century. It was reintroduced from 1996 to 1998 in the Sava and Drava rivers.

Beavers spread from Croatia into Slovenia along the Sava, Drava, Mura and Kolpa rivers.

In Greece, the Eurasian beaver was present in the Last Glacial Period; remains have been found in Epirus. Beaver remains from the Neolithic have been found in coastal Evros and Argura; from the Neolithic to Bronze Age transition period in the Ptolemaida basin and in Sitagroi; and beaver remains from the Early Helladic II have been found in northeastern Peloponnese. In the 4th century BC, Aristotle described this species under the name λάταξ/ (latax). He wrote that it is wider than the otter, with strong teeth, and at night it often uses these teeth to cut down trees on riverbanks. Ιt's not clear when beavers vanished from Kastoria (which may have been named after the beaver – κάστορας in Greek), but as late as the 18th century they were still hunted for fur. Buffon wrote that they were very rare in Greece at that time. In the 19th century, beavers could still be found in the Alfeios river and in Mesolongi.

The beaver resurgence in Eurasia has brought an increase in human-beaver encounters. In May 2013, a Belarusian fisherman who "tried to grab" a beaver died after it bit him several times, severing an artery in his leg, which caused him to bleed to death.

=== The Nordics ===
In Denmark, the beaver appears to have gone extinct 2,000–2,500 years ago, though a small population might have survived into the 1st millennium AD. In 1999, 18 beavers were reintroduced to the river Flynder in Klosterhede Plantage state forest in west-central Jutland, brought from the Elbe river in Germany. At Arresø in northern Zealand, 23 beavers were reintroduced between 2009 and 2011. By 2019, it was estimated that the Jutland population had increased to 240–270 individuals, and had spread far, from Hanstholm in the north to Varde and Kolding in the south. The population in northern Zealand, which had yet to significantly expand its geographic range, had increased to 50–60 individuals in 2019.

In Norway, there was still a beaver population in the early 1900s, one of the few surviving in Europe at that time. Following protection, the Norwegian range of the species has expanded. The surviving population was in southern Norway; beavers were reintroduced to central Norway's Ingdalselva River watershed on the Agdenes peninsula in Sør-Trøndelag in 1968–1969. The area is hilly to mountainous, with many small watersheds. Rivers are often too steep for beavers, so their habitat is scattered, and there's often only room for one territory in a habitat patch. The beavers spread slowly from watershed to watershed in the hilly terrain. Some spread could only be plausibly explained by assuming travel through sheltered sea water in fjords.

In Sweden, the Eurasian beaver had been hunted to extinction around 1870. Between 1922 and 1939, some 80 individuals were imported from Norway and introduced to 19 sites in Sweden. In 1995, the Swedish beaver population was estimated at 100,000.

In Finland, there are some Eurasian beavers that have been re-introduced or spread from Sweden, but most of the Finnish population is a released North American beaver population. This population is controlled to prevent it from spreading into areas inhabited by the Eurasian beaver.

=== British Isles ===
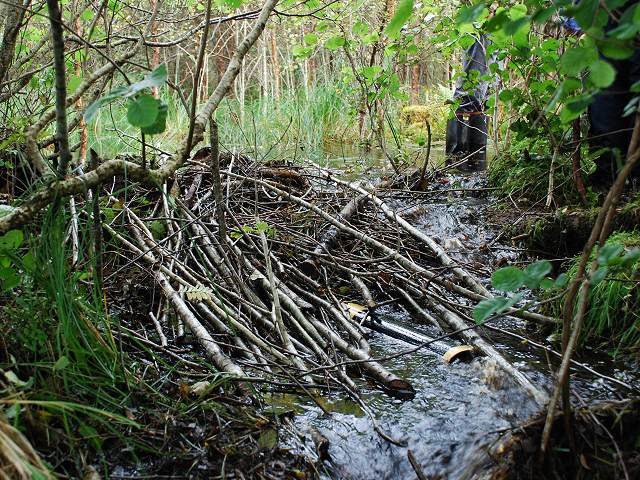
Beaver dam, Scotland

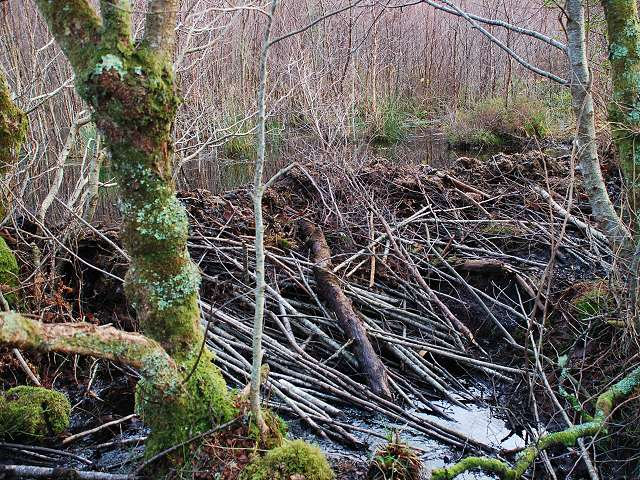
The same dam four months later

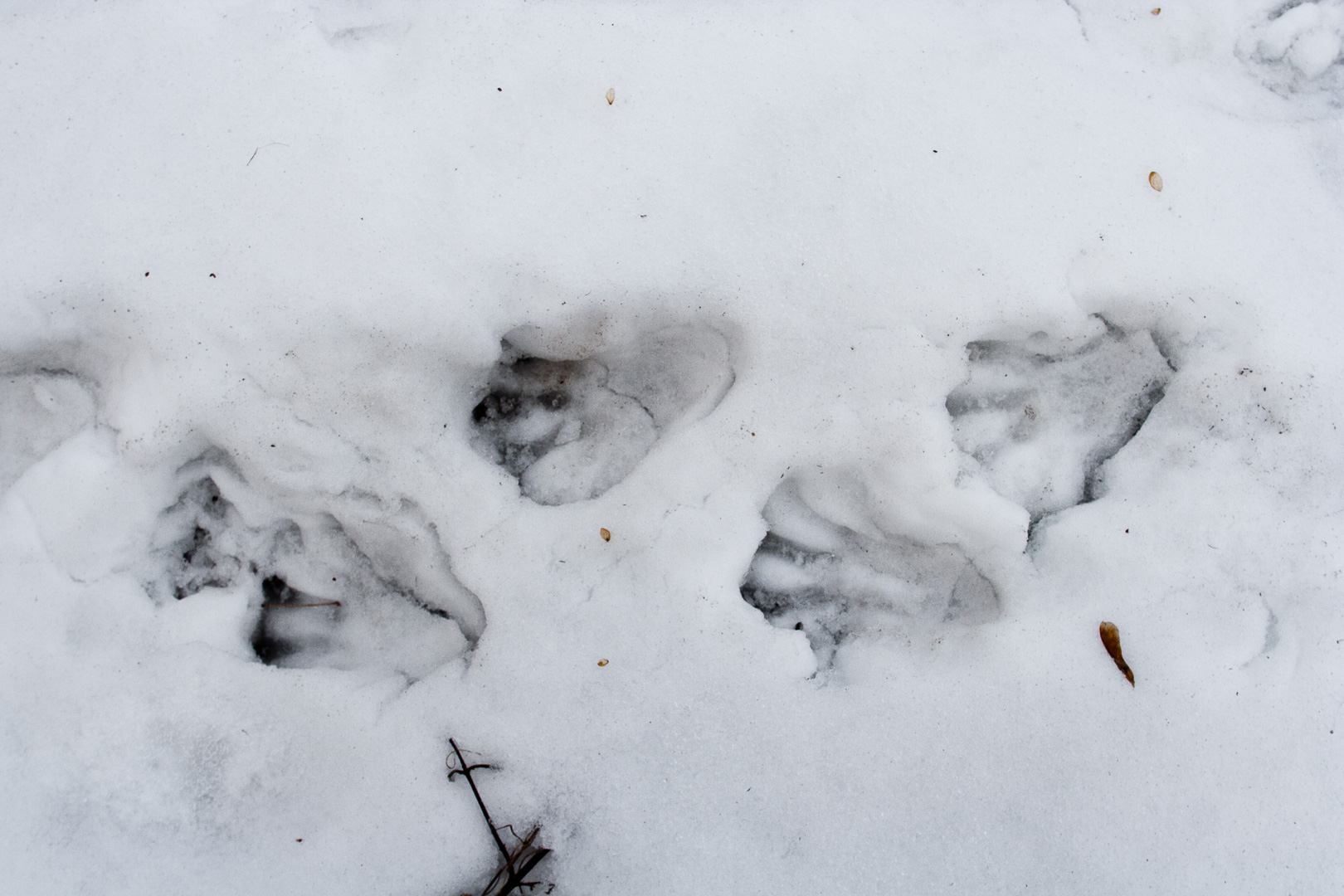
Beaver tracks in snow

The Eurasian beaver was well-established in Great Britain, but was driven extinct there by humans in the 16th century, with the last known historical reference in England in 1526. It is unclear whether beavers ever existed in Ireland. In the early 21st century, the beaver became the first mammal to be successfully reintroduced in the United Kingdom, after unofficial and official reintroductions to Scotland and England.

==== Scotland ====
In Scotland, free-living beaver populations occur around in several parts of the highlands following re-introduction efforts. The first official releases were in 2009, when three beaver families of 11 individuals, sourced from Norway, were released in Knapdale forest, Argyll by the Scottish Wildlife Trust and the Royal Zoological Society of Scotland. This release marked the start of the Scottish Beaver Trial, a five-year research project to assess the effects of beaver reintroduction. Sixteen beavers were released between 2009 and 2014 in Knapdale. A population also became established along the River Tay: this population is of unknown origin. In 2016, the Scottish government declared that the beaver populations in Knapdale and Tayside could remain and naturally expand. Figures from 2022 suggested that there were more than 1,500 beavers in Scotland, with the potential for a population of up to 10,000 by 2030. Further surveys are taking place. Since being officially recognised as a wild species translocations of the existing Scottish population have also been undertaken, both within the existing catchment areas and as part of efforts to enable beavers to establish a wider range. Releases seeking to establish new populations have been undertaken in Glen Affric and the Cairngorms National Park.

==== England ====
In England, wild beavers are now present in all nine regions, with a population exceeding 1,000 (2024 estimate). Most sites are recent authorised introductions in large enclosures, but there are established completely free-living populations in the South West. A population of unknown origin has been present on the River Otter, Devon since 2008. An additional pair was released to increase genetic diversity in 2016. In 2022, beavers became legally protected in England, "making it illegal to capture, kill, injure or disturb them."

==== Wales ====
In Wales a family of beavers has lived since 2021 in the Cors Dyfi nature reserve in Powys. In 2024, Natural Resources Wales confirmed there are also a small number of free-living beavers. In September 2024, the Welsh Government announced support for protecting current populations and the managed introduction of more beavers.

=== Asia ===
Fossils of C. fiber have been discovered in the famous Denisova Cave. In Iran, Iraq, Syria, and Turkey, subfossil evidence of beavers extends down to the floodplains of the Tigris-Euphrates basin, and a carved stone stela dating between 1,000 and 800 BC in the Tell Halaf archaeological site along the Khabur River in northeastern Syria depicts a beaver. Although accounts of 19th-century European visitors to West Asia appear to confuse beavers with otters, a 20th-century report of beavers by Hans Kummerlöwe in the Ceyhan River drainage of southern Turkey includes the diagnostic red incisor teeth, flat, scaly tail, and presence of gnawed willow stems.

According to the Encyclopaedia Iranica, early Iranian Avestan and Pahlavi, and later Islamic literature, all had different words for otter and beaver, and castoreum was highly valued in the region. Johannes Ludwijk Schlimmer, a noted Dutch physician in 19th-century Iran, reported small numbers of beavers below the confluence of the Tigris and the Euphrates, along the bank of the Shatt al-Arab in the provinces of Shushtar and Dezful. Austen Layard reported finding beavers during his visit to the Kabur River in Syria in the 1850s, but noted they were being rapidly hunted for said castoreum to extirpation. Beavers were specifically sacred to Zoroastrianism (which also revered otters), and there were laws against killing these animals.

In China, a few hundred Eurasian beavers live in the basin of the Ulungur River near the international border with Mongolia. The Bulgan Beaver Nature Reserve was established in 1980 for their protection.

== Behaviour and ecology ==
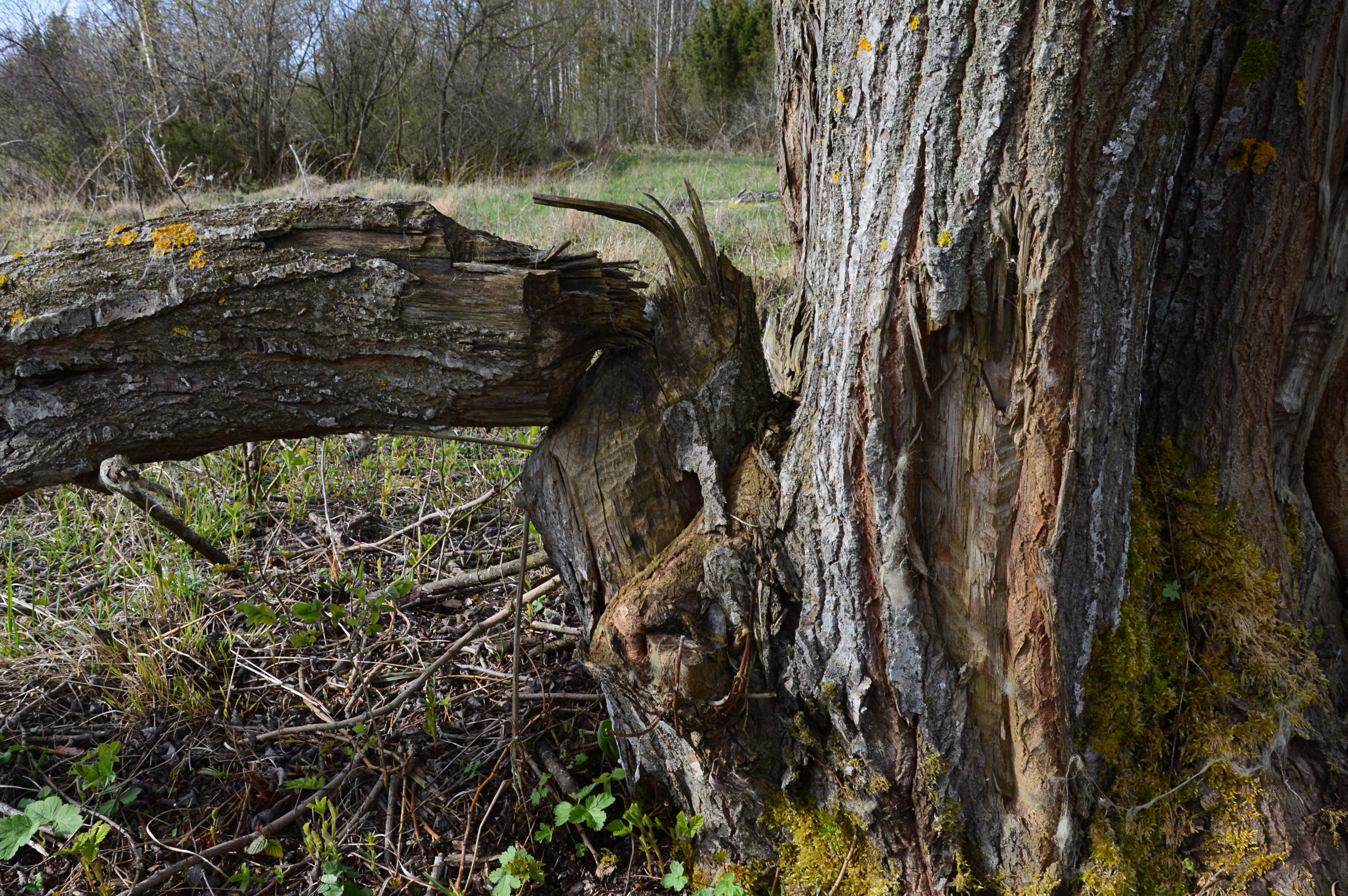
Signs of beaver activity

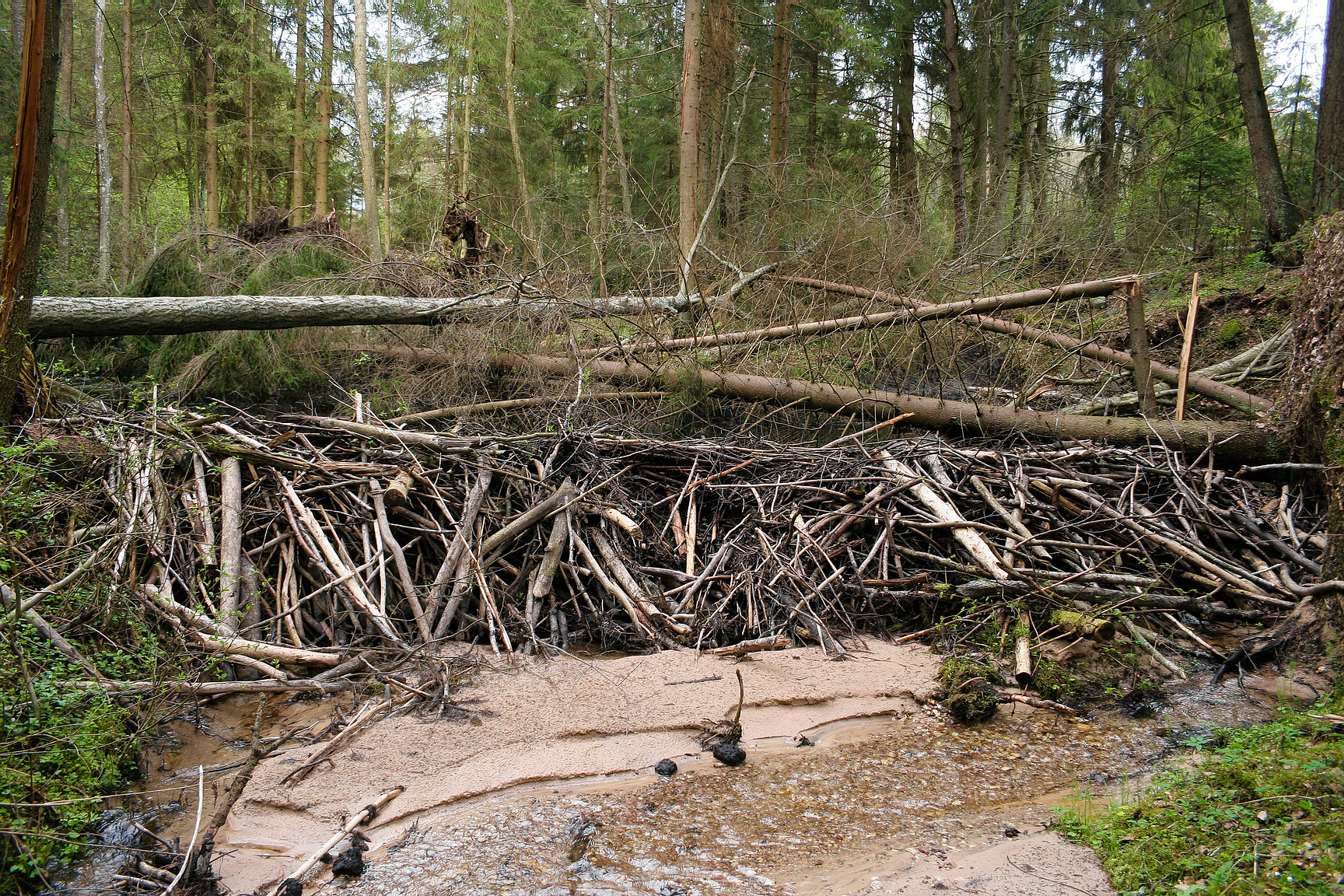
Large beaver dam in Lithuania

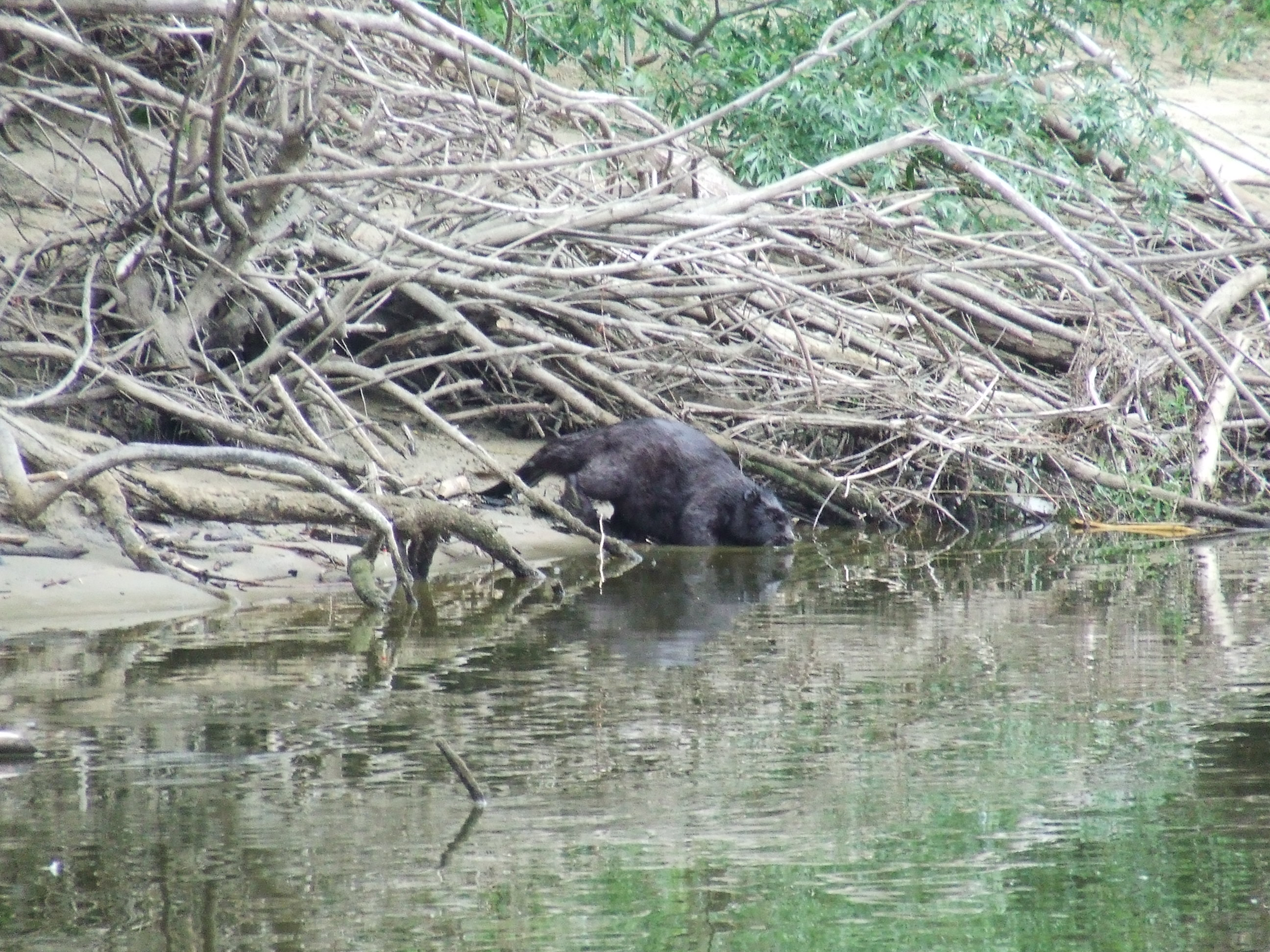
Beaver lodge in Poland

The Eurasian beaver is a keystone species, as it helps to support the ecosystem which it inhabits. It creates wetlands, which provide habitat for European water vole, Eurasian otter and Eurasian water shrew. By coppicing waterside trees and shrubs it facilitates their regrowth as dense shrubs, thus providing cover for birds and other animals. Beavers build dams that trap sediment, improve water quality, recharge groundwater tables and increase cover and forage for trout and salmon. Also, abundance and diversity of vespertilionid bats increase, apparently because of gaps created in forests, making it easier for bats to navigate.

=== Reproduction ===
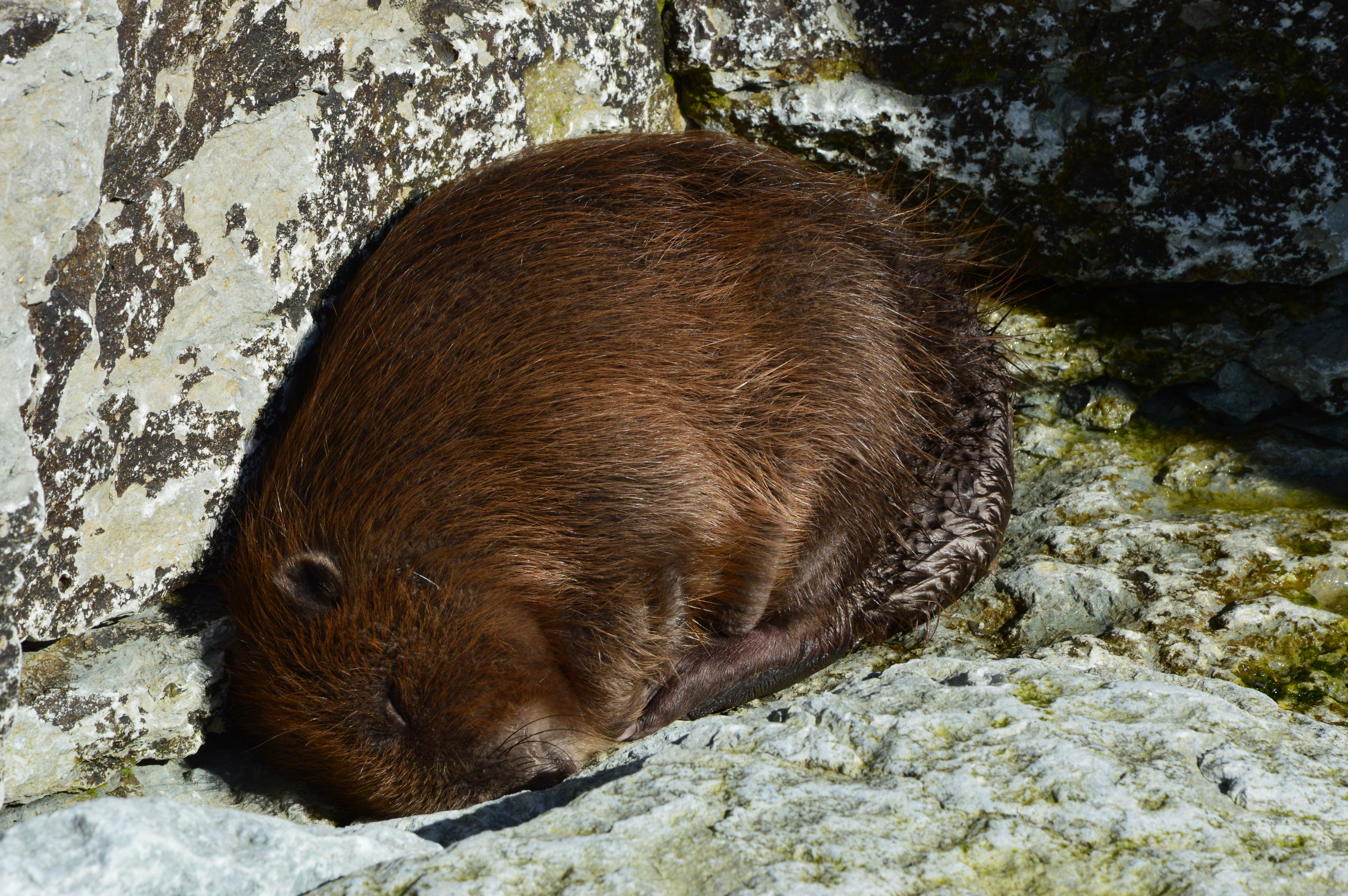
Sleeping Eurasian beaver in Osmussaar

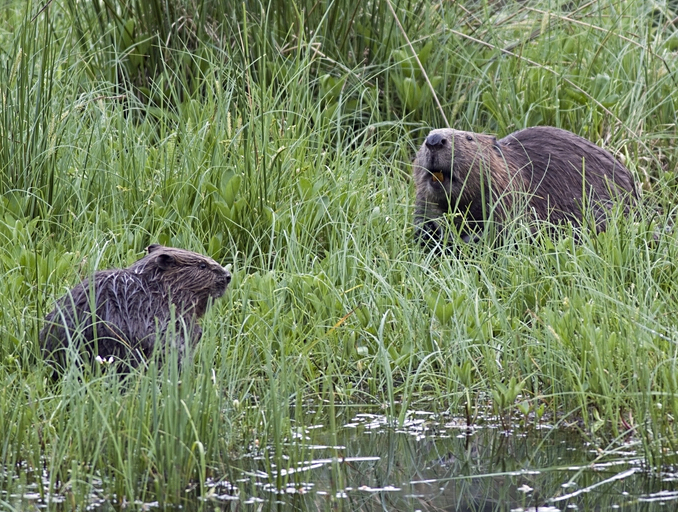
Eurasian beaver with her kit along the River Tay

Eurasian beavers have one litter per year, coming into oestrus for only 12 to 24 hours, between late December and May, but peaking in January. Unlike most other rodents, beaver pairs are monogamous, staying together for multiple breeding seasons. Gestation averages 107 days and they average three kits per litter with a range of two to six kits. Most beavers do not reproduce until they are three years of age, but about 20% of two-year-old females reproduce.

=== Diet ===
European beavers are herbivorous, eating "water and river bank plants", including tubers, shoots, twigs, leaves, buds, "rootstocks of myrtles, cattails, water lilies", and also trees (such as willow, aspen, and birch), including softwood tree bark. In agricultural areas, beavers will consume crops as well. Their long appendices and the microorganisms within make it possible for them to digest bark cellulose. Their daily food intake is approximately 20% of their body weight.

== Fossil record ==
Fossils found in the Spanish region around Atapuerca show that the Eurasian beaver was present in the Early Pleistocene but not in the Middle Pleistocene despite apparently favourable environmental conditions. It reappeared in the region during the Late Pleistocene and Holocene.

== Conservation ==
The Eurasian beaver Castor fiber was once widespread in Europe and Asia but by the beginning of the 20th century both the numbers and range of the species had been drastically diminished, mainly due to hunting. At this time, the global population was estimated to be around 1,200 individuals, living in eight separate sub-populations. Conservation of the Eurasian beaver began in 1923 in the Soviet Union, with the establishment of the Voronezh Nature Reserve. From 1934 to 1977, approximately 3,000 Eurasian beavers from Voronezh were reintroduced to 52 regions from Poland to Mongolia. In 2008, the Eurasian beaver was categorized as least concern on the IUCN Red List, as the global population had recovered sufficiently with the help of global conservation programmes. Currently, the largest population resides in Europe, where it was reintroduced in 25 countries and conservation efforts are ongoing. However, populations in Asia remain small and fragmented, and are under considerable threat.
