= Santibáñez de Tera =

Coordinates: 41°59′N 5°55′W

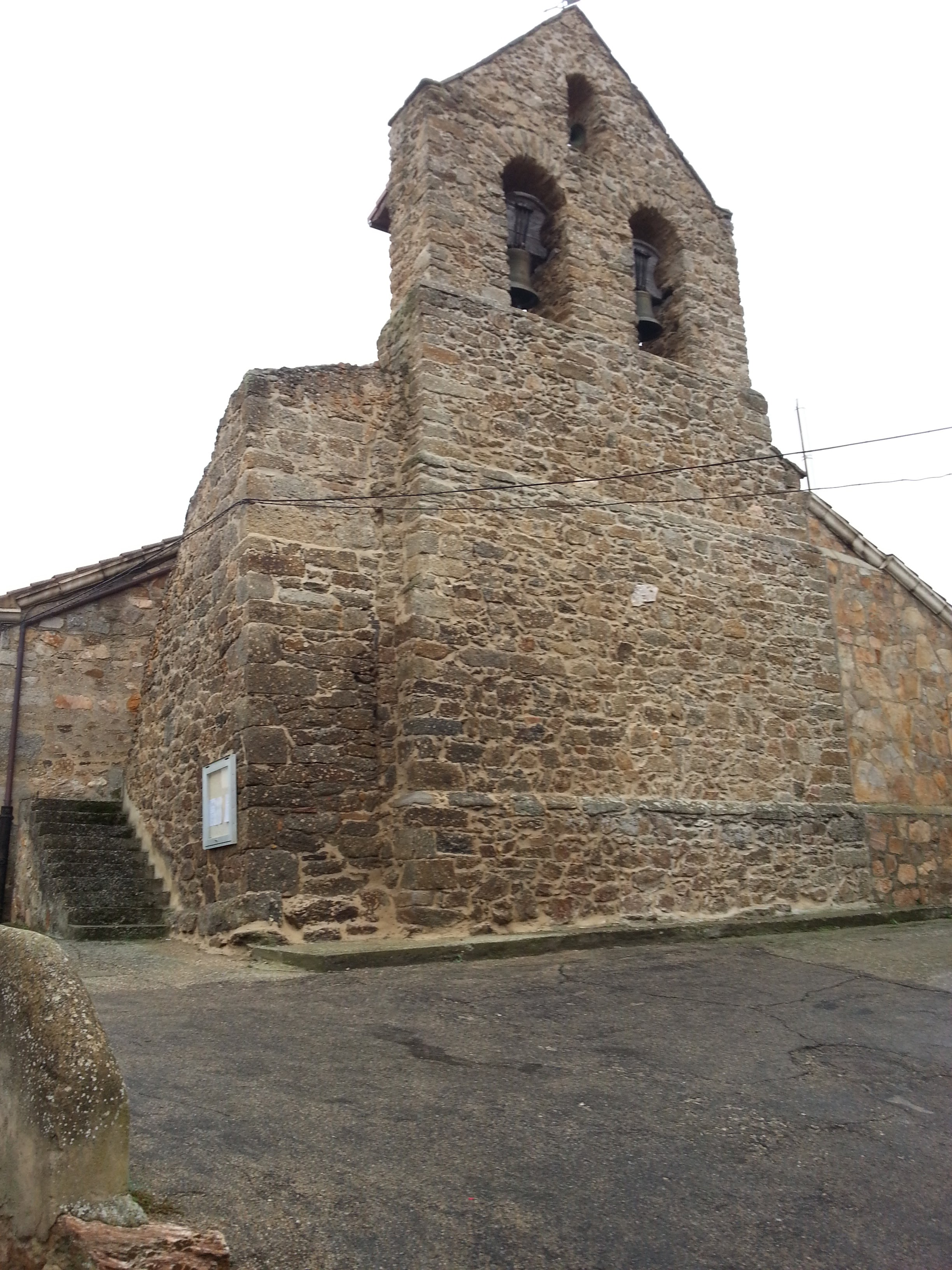

- Flag Coat of arms
- Interactive map of Santibáñez de Tera
- Country: Spain
- Autonomous community: Castile and León
- Province: Zamora
- Municipality: Santibáñez de Tera

Area
  - Total: 19 km^{2} (7.3 sq mi)

Population (2025-01-01)
  - Total: 351
  - Density: 18/km^{2} (48/sq mi)
- Time zone: UTC+1 (CET)
  - Summer (DST): UTC+2 (CEST)
- Website: Official website

Santibáñez de Tera (Spanish pronunciation: [santiˈβaɲeθ ðe ˈteɾa]) is a municipality located in the province of Zamora, Castile and León, Spain. According to the 2004 census (INE), the municipality has a population of 605 inhabitants.
