= Los Cerralbos =

- Municipality
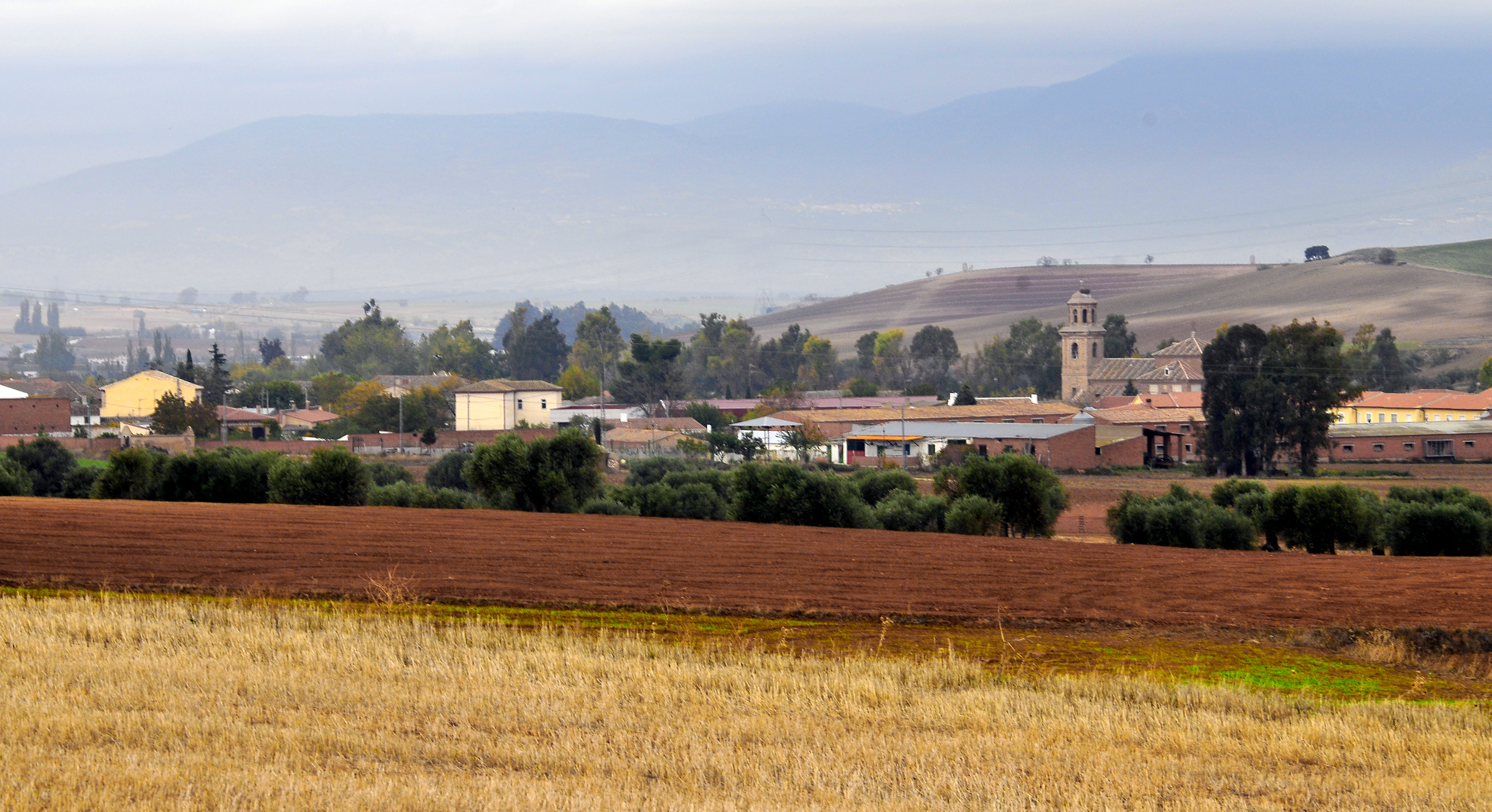

- Flag Coat of arms
- Interactive map of Los Cerralbos
- Location in Spain Los Cerralbos (Castilla-La Mancha)
- Coordinates: 39°58′59″N 4°34′25″W
- Country: Spain
- Autonomous community: Castilla–La Mancha
- Province: Toledo
- Founded: 1835

Area
  - Total: 40.15 km^{2} (15.50 sq mi)
- Elevation: 462 m (1,516 ft)

Population (2025-01-01)
  - Total: 452
  - Density: 11.3/km^{2} (29.2/sq mi)
- Demonym(s): Cerralbeño, ña
- Time zone: UTC+1 (CET)
  - Summer (DST): UTC+2 (CEST)
- Postal code: 45682
- Dialing code: 925

Los Cerralbos is a municipality of Spain belonging to the province of Toledo, in the autonomous community of Castilla–La Mancha. It features a total area of 40.15 square kilometres (15.50 mi^{2}), and, as of 1 January 2021, a registered population of 418.

== History ==
The municipality was created in 1835 under the purview of the 1833 royal decree of territorial division of Spain, as a merger of the municipalities of Cerralbo de Talavera and Cerralbo de Escalona.
