= P'iqi Q'ara (disambiguation) =

P'iqi Q'ara or P'iq'iñ Q'ara (Aymara p'iqi, p'iq'iña, phiq'i, phiq'iña head, q'ara bald, bare, "bald-headed", also spelled Pekhe Khara or Pekheñ Khara, Pequen Khara, Phekhen Khara) is a mountain on the border of the municipalities of Coripata and Coroico, Nor Yungas Province, La Paz Department, Bolivia.

P'iqi Q'ara may also refer to:

- P'iqi Q'ara, a mountain on the border of the municipalities of Coripata and Coroico, Nor Yungas Province, La Paz Department, Bolivia
- P'iqi Q'ara (Coroico), a mountain in the Coroico Municipality, Nor Yungas Province, La Paz Department, Bolivia
- P'iq'iñ Q'ara (Cochabamba), a mountain in the Cochabamba Department, Bolivia
- P'iq'iñ Q'ara (La Paz), a mountain in the Palca Municipality, Murillo Province, La Paz Department, Bolivia
- P'iq'iñ Q'ara (Loayza), a mountain in the Loayza Province, La Paz Department, Bolivia
- P'iq'iñ Q'ara (Mecapaca), a mountain in the Mecapaca Municipality, Murillo Province, La Paz Department, Bolivia
- P'iq'iñ Q'ara (Oruro), a mountain in the Oruro Department, Bolivia
