= Carmen Pampa =

- Community
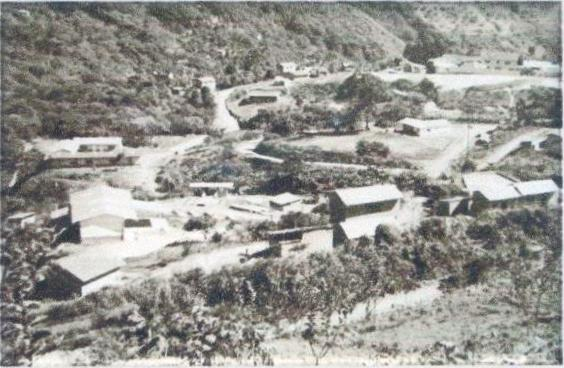
- Photo of Carmen Pampa, circa 1971 (A. Pardo Asllani)

- Location in Bolivia
- Coordinates: 16°15′47.7″S 67°41′53.7″W
- Country: Bolivia
- Department: La Paz Department
- Province: Nor Yungas Province
- Elevation: 5,740 ft (1,750 m)
- Time zone: UTC-4 (BOT)

Carmen Pampa is a community in Bolivia situated 112 km from La Paz. Carmen Pampa is in the municipality of Coroico, the capital of the Nor Yungas Province of the La Paz Department, Bolivia. According to Holdridge life zones classification, it is ecologically a premontane tropical moist forest. The population is composed mainly of Aymara people, mostly farmers. The community also hosts the Unidad Académica Campesina-Carmen Pampa (UAC-Carmen Pampa) and the San Francisco Xavier High School.

== History ==
The community was founded with the repartition of land to patrón Augusto Vicente Pijoán after the Bolivian War of Independence. The community was named for the Our Lady of Mount Carmel, chosen by Matilde Belmonte, mother of the patrón of the new hacienda. After Bolivia's agrarian reform, most of the land was given to the hacienda's peons, and the remaining land was sold to Carlos López Videla Guamán.

Xavierian brothers bought land in the Carmen Pampa to open a high school in 1962. The Colegio San Francisco Xavier, under the direction of Brother Niles "Nilo" Cullen, received the best students from all over the Prelature (later, Diocese) of Coroico, then under Msgr. Thomas Manning. The ideals of the high school were "Trabajo, Estudio, Deporte y Religión" ("Work, Study, Sports and Religion").

With the departure of Brother Nilo from Carmen Pampa in 1983, Franciscan Sister Mary Damon Nolan was made principal. The Xaverian Brothers closed the high school in 1997 and left the infrastructure to the UAC-Carmen Pampa.

The UAC-Carmen Pampa, part of the Universidad Católica Boliviana "San Pablo", was founded in Carmen Pampa in 1993 by Sister Mary Damon Nolan. Its mission is to make higher education available to young people from rural areas, and offers a Licenciatura (B.S.-equivalent) in Agronomy, Veterinary/Animal Science, Nursing, Education and Tourism.
