= Military Bishopric of Argentina =

Catholic ecclesiastical jurisdiction

Military Bishopric of Argentina Obispado Castrense de Argentina

Location
- Country: Argentina
- Metropolitan: Immediately subject to the Holy See

Information
- Denomination: Roman Catholic
- Rite: Latin Rite
- Established: 8 July 1957 (69 years ago)
- Cathedral: Cathedral of Mary Star of the Sea in Buenos Aires
- Patron saint: Our Lady of Luján

Current leadership
- Pope: Leo XIV
- Bishop: Santiago Olivera

Website
- obispadocastrenseargentina.org

The Military Bishopric of Argentina (Spanish: Obispado Castrense de Argentina) is a military ordinariate (special diocese) of the Roman Catholic Church that provides religious services to Catholics serving in the Argentine Armed Forces.

It is exempt, i.e. immediately subject to the Holy See and its Roman Congregation for Bishops, and usually not combined with another see (unlike some other countries).

Its patron saint is Our Lady of Luján and the Episcopal seat is located at the (also Marian) Cathedral of the Star of the Sea (Catedral Stella Maris) in Buenos Aires, national capital of Argentina.

== Statistics ==
As per 2014, it provides pastoral care to Roman Catholics serving in the Argentine Armed Forces, paramilitary National Gendarmerie and Naval Prefecture of Argentina in 4 parishes and 237 missions with 195 priests (178 diocesan, 17 religious), 1 deacon, 29 lay religious (17 brothers, 12 sisters) and 8 seminarians.

== History ==
It was created as the Military vicariate of Argentina on 8 July 1957, and elevated to the Military ordinariate of Argentina on 21 July 1986. It remains known as Obispado Castrense (Army bishopric), as in several hispanophone countries.

== Episcopal Office holders ==
- It once had one Auxiliary Bishop of the Military Vicariate : Victorio Manuel Bonamín, Salesians (S.D.B.) (1960.01.27 – retired 1982.03.30), Titular Bishop of Bita (1960.01.27 – death 1991.11.11) and initially still Auxiliary Bishop of Buenos Aires (Argentina) (1960.01.27 – retired 1975.04.22)

=== Military Vicars of Argentina ===
- Fermín Emilio Lafitte (appointed 1957 – resigned 1959), while Titular Archbishop of Antiochia in Pisidia (1958.01.20 – 1959.03.25) and Coadjutor Archbishop of Córdoba (Argentina) (1958.01.20 – 1959.03.25), later Metropolitan Archbishop of Buenos Aires (Argentina) (1959.03.25 – death 1959.08.08); previously Bishop of above Córdoba (1927.07.07 – 1934.04.20), promoted Metropolitan Archbishop of Córdoba (1934.04.20 – 1958.01.20)
- Antonio Caggiano (appointed 14 December 1959 – retired 7 July 1975), while Metropolitan Archbishop of Buenos Aires (1959.08.15 – retired 1975.04.22), President of Episcopal Conference of Argentina (1958–1970), was already created Cardinal-Priest of S. Lorenzo in Panisperna (1946.02.22 – 1979.10.23) while Bishop of Rosario (Argentina) (1934.09.13 – 1959.08.15); died 1979
- Adolfo Servando Tortolo (appointed 7 July 1975 – retired 30 March 1982), while Metropolitan Archbishop of Paraná (Argentina) (1962.09.06 – 1986.04.01) and President of Episcopal Conference of Argentina (1970–1976); died 1998
- José Miguel Medina (appointed 30 March 1982 – see below first Military Ordinary 21 July 1986), initially still Bishop of Jujuy (Argentina) (1965.09.08 – 1983.07.07)

=== Military Ordinaries of Argentina ===
- José Miguel Medina (see above last Military Vicar promoted 21 July 1986 – died 7 March 1990), nor more other office
- Norberto Eugenio Conrado Martina, Friars Minor (O.F.M.) (appointed 8 November 1990 – died 28 August 2001), Titular Bishop of Satafis (1990.11.08 – 1998.03.07)
- Antonio Baseotto, Congregation of the Most Holy Redeemer (C.Ss.R.) (8 November 2002 – retired 15 May 2007), no other office; previously Coadjutor Bishop of Añatuya (Argentina) (1991.02.01 – 1992.12.21), succeeded as Bishop of Añatuya (1992.12.21 – 2002.11.08)
- long vacancy : No military Ordinary 2007–2017.
- Santiago Olivera (2017.03.28 – ...), previously Bishop of Cruz del Eje (Argentina) (2008.06.24 – 2017.03.28).

== See also ==
- List of Catholic dioceses in Argentina

== Sources and external links ==
- Media related to Military Bishopric of Argentina at Wikimedia Commons
- Obispado Castrense de Argentina (Official website, in Spanish)
- GCatholic Military Ordinariate of Obispado Castrense de la Argentina, with Google map & satellite photo - data for all sections
- Military Ordinariate of Argentina (Catholic-Hierarchy)
