= Callisaya =

Callisaya or Calizaya is a surname of Aymara and Quechua origin common in Bolivia. It is derived from the word kalissáya, a term for herbalists.

== People with the surname ==
- Pedro Callisaya (born 1966), Bolivian human rights activist
- Policarpio Calizaya (born 1962), Bolivian long-distance runner
- Rubén Callisaya (born 1961), Bolivian politician
- Sonia Calizaya (born 1976), Bolivian long-distance runner
