= Antonio Baseotto =

Argentine Roman Catholic bishop (1932–2025)

His Excellency Antonio Baseotto
- Military Bishop Emeritus of Argentina
- Appointed: 8 November 2002
- Term ended: 15 May 2007
- Predecessor: Norberto Eugenio Conrado Martina
- Successor: Santiago Olivera
- Previous post: Bishop of Añatuya (1992–2002)

Orders
- Ordination: 6 April 1957
- Consecration: 27 April 1991 by Jorge Gottau

Personal details
- Born: Antonio Juan Baseotto; 4 April 1932 Buenos Aires, Argentina
- Died: 26 May 2025 (aged 93) Buenos Aires, Argentina

Antonio Juan Baseotto (4 April 1932 – 26 May 2025) was an Argentine Roman Catholic bishop. Until February 2005 he was Argentina's military bishop (obispo castrense), that is, the head of the military chaplains, with the status of Subsecretary of State.

== Biography ==
Baseotto was born on 4 April 1932, and ordained as a priest in 1957. In the 1980s, he served in the diocese of Añatuya, Santiago del Estero, a province ruled in a quasi-feudalistic fashion by the indefinitely-reelected old-time Peronist Carlos Juárez. During this time, he was reportedly in close relation with the Juárez family.

He was in charge of the Sunday programming schedule in a local TV channel and several times he was formally accused of anti-Semitism due to public statements on air. Among other things, in 1986 he affirmed that most of the Jewish community in Argentina "devotes itself, with much skill and often with very few moral principles, to big business... It does not matter the means... If pornography is good business, [the Jew] sells pornography. And if drugs are good business, he sells drugs...". He also claimed that "the means for spreading culture are in the hands of the Hebrews", who are "disintegrat[ing] the bases" of the national civilization and culture. He never went to court or apologized for these statements.

Baseotto was also allegedly involved in the murder of Jimena Hernández in 1988. According to some sources, he ordered the murder of the girl because she discovered by mistake a meeting between the bishop and drug traffickers. Baseotto ordered Pablo López to kill her and then masked his escape, making him pass by a false priest in the diocese of which he was in charged, Añatuya.

In 1992 Baseotto was appointed bishop of his diocese. He spent a total of 27 years in Añatuya. During his time, he was acknowledged as a supporter of the provincial government and especially of its police force, accused of innumerable abuses and violations of human rights. In bishops' meetings he repeatedly refused to condemn or criticize the policies of President Menem's administration (denounced by most other bishops as causes of poverty).

He once stated that laws on reproductive and sexual health (passed in several provinces), which make the State responsible for providing contraceptives to the population, "legitimize prostitution", and compared them to Nazism. He also made this comparison referring to aborted fetuses ("segregated", he claimed, as when "non-Aryans" were selected for extermination).

In November 2002, Baseotto was appointed military vicar (vicario castrense) by Pope John Paul II. Due to a previous agreement with the Vatican, this post implies an official position as Subsecretary of State (with monthly wages of about 4,500 Argentine pesos, about 1,500 USD).

On 10 December 2004, during the Mass of the Dead for the Country, Baseotto justified the violations of human rights committed during the so-called Dirty War: "It was a war, and in a war it is impossible to avoid excesses". (See also Theory of the two demons.)

On 18 February 2005, Baseotto became a national focus of controversy after he sent a letter to the national Minister of Health Ginés González García, accusing him of committing "apology of crime" because of the minister's support for the legalization of abortion in Argentina. Baseotto expressed his disgust by paraphrasing Mark 9:42 ("And whosoever shall cause one of these little ones that believe on me to stumble, it were better for him if a great millstone were hanged about his neck, and he were cast into the sea") and suggesting that González García should be given that treatment. Besides the usage of scripture (widely acknowledged as inappropriate even by other Catholic bishops), Baseotto was heavily criticized because this "punishment" echoes the infamous vuelos de la muerte ("flights of death") whereby prisoners of the last military regime were dumped into the Atlantic Ocean from planes. The conflict escalated and caused the Argentine government to relieve Baseotto of his job as the head of the military chaplains. This prompted accusations on the part of Catholic observers (also fueled by right-wing opposition leaders and media) that such actions threatened religious freedom. The government pointed out that Baseotto was still a bishop and could celebrate Mass and perform pastoral duties wherever he chose — he would not be on the state payroll.

Baseotto resigned, following Canon Law, upon turning 75. Pope Benedict XVI officially accepted the resignation on 15 May 2007, and appointed the Vicar General Pedro Candia for the post on a temporary basis until a new chaplain was chosen.

Baseotto died on 26 May 2025, at the age of 93.

Catholic Church titles
Preceded by Norberto Eugenio Conrado Martina	Military Bishop of Argentina; 2002–2007	Succeeded by Santiago Olivera
Preceded by Jorge Gottau	Bishop of Añatuya; 1992–2002	Succeeded by Adolfo Armando Uriona
