= Juan Vargas Aruquipa =

Bolivian prelate of the Catholic prelate

His Excellency The Most Reverend Monsignor Juan Vargas Aruquipa
- Bishop Emeritus of Coroico
- Church: Catholic; Latin Church
- Archdiocese: La Paz
- Diocese: Coroico
- Installed: 20 August 1997
- Term ended: 3 December 2022
- Predecessor: Tomás Roberto Manning
- Successor: Juan Carlos Huaygua Oropeza
- Previous posts: Auxiliary bishop of Coroico (1992-1997); Titular Bishop of Bita (1992-1997)

Orders
- Ordination: 10 July 1980
- Consecration: by Tomás Roberto Manning (principal consecrator); Edmundo Luis Flavio Abastoflor Montero (co-consecrator); Adhemar Esquivel Kohenque (co-consecrator)

Personal details
- Born: 8 March 1947 (age 79) Achacachi, La Paz, Bolivia

Styles of Juan Vargas Aruquipa
- Reference style: His Excellency; The Most Reverend
- Spoken style: Your Excellency
- Religious style: Bishop

Monsignor Juan Vargas y Aruquipa (born 8 March 1947) is a Bolivian prelate of the Catholic Church. He served as the Bishop of the Roman Catholic Diocese of Coroico from 1997 to 2022. Prior to his post as diocesan bishop, he served as an auxiliary bishop in Coroico and as a titular bishop of the Titular See of Bita. During his time as bishop, he was one of Bolivia's only two Catholic bishops of indigenous descent. He is the president of Unidad Académica Campesina-Carmen Pampa.

== Ecclesiastical career ==
On 20 July 1980, Vargas y Aruquipa was ordained to the priesthood in the Roman Catholic Diocese of Coroico. He was appointed as an auxiliary bishop of Coroico and as a titular bishop of Bita on 15 January 1992 by Pope John Paul II and was ordained as a bishop at Saint Maria Magdalena Catholic Church in Sorata on 25 March 1992. He was appointed as the Diocesan Bishop of Coroico on 20 August 1997 and served as bishop until his retirement in 2022.

Following a period of political turmoil and protests that led to the resignation of President Gonzalo Sánchez de Lozada on 17 October 2003, Vargas y Aruquipa spoke out about rampant poverty and social and political injustices in Bolivia.

He had an official audience with Pope Francis on 18 September 2017. In 2019, he participated in the Synod of Bishops for the Pan-Amazon region.

In July 2020, he was one of over a hundred bishops who signed a statement against global corporate greed.

He attended the Bolivian Episcopal Conference in 2021 as a pastoral care official.

Vargas y Aruquipa's resignation from the office of Bishop of Coroico was officially accepted by Pope Francis on 3 December 2022.

In 2023, he served as a co-consecrator at the consecration of his successor, Bishop Juan Carlos Huaygua Oropeza.

He is the president of Unidad Académica Campesina-Carmen Pampa.

== Personal life ==
Vargas y Aruquipa was born in Achacachi on 8 March 1947. He is of Native Bolivian descent.

He was awarded the highest office of the Royal Order of Merit of Prince Uchicho by King Julio I for his close relationship with the Afro-Bolivian community.

== Honours ==
- Knight of the Grand Collar of the Royal Order of Merit of Prince Uchicho
