= Archdiocese of Tucumán =

Catholic ecclesiastical territory

Coordinates: 26.8316°S 65.2035°W

Archdiocese of Tucumán Archidioecesis Tucumanensis Arquidiócesis de Tucumán

Catholic
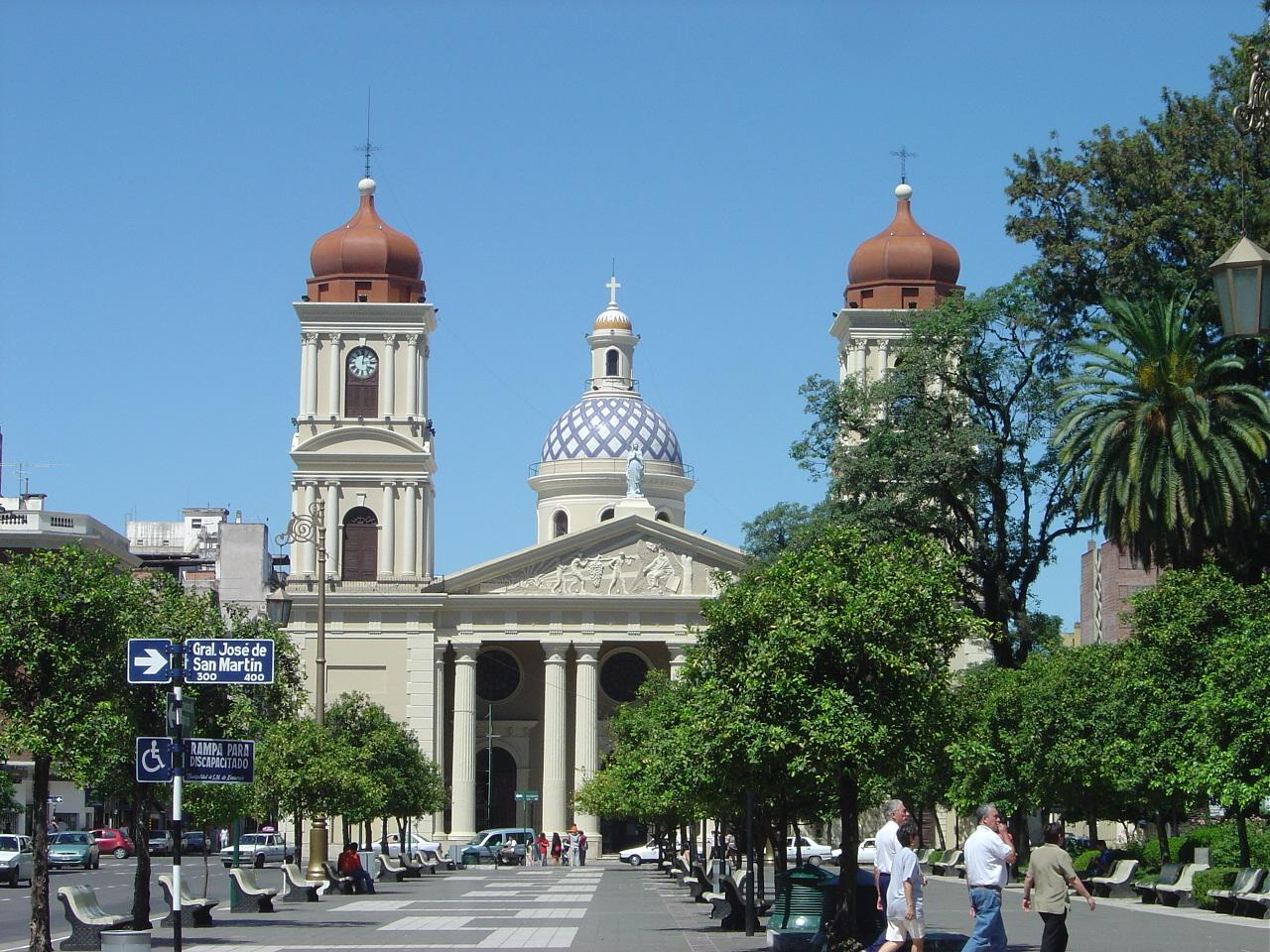
- Cathedral of Our Lady of the Incarnation

Location
- Country: Argentina
- Ecclesiastical province: Tucumán

Statistics
- Area: 10,996 km^{2} (4,246 sq mi)
- Population: Total; Catholics: (as of 2010); 1,112,000; 1,034,201 (93%)
- Parishes: 47

Information
- Denomination: Roman Catholic
- Rite: Roman Rite
- Established: 15 February 1897 (129 years ago)
- Cathedral: Cathedral of Our Lady of the Incarnation in San Miguel de Tucumán
- Patron saint: Virgin of Mercy; St Jude the Apostle; St Simon the Apostle

Current leadership
- Pope: Leo XIV
- Metropolitan Archbishop: Carlos Alberto Sánchez
- Auxiliary Bishops: Roberto José Ferrari
- Bishops emeritus: Luis Héctor Villalba

Website
- www.arztucuman.org.ar

The Roman Catholic Archdiocese of Tucumán (Latin: Archidioecesis Tucumanensis) is in Argentina and is a metropolitan diocese. Its suffragan sees include Añatuya, Concepción and Santiago del Estero.

== History ==
The first Diocese of Tucumán was erected in 1570 but the see was in Santiago del Estero, until 1697, and later in Córdoba: it is now the Roman Catholic Archdiocese of Córdoba.

On 15 February 1897 Pope Leo XIII founded the new Diocese of Tucumán from territory taken from the Diocese of Salta. Pope Pius XII elevated it to an archdiocese on 11 February 1957. It lost territory to the Diocese of Concepción when it was created in 1963.

== Bishops ==
=== Ordinaries ===
- Pedro Miguel Argandoña Pastene Salazar (1744–1762)
- Pablo Padilla y Bárcena (1898–1921)
- Barnabé Piedrabuena (1923–1928)
- Agustín Barrere, F.M.I. (1930–1952)
- Juan Carlos Aramburu (1953–1967), appointed Coadjutor Archbishop of Buenos Aires; future Cardinal
- Blas Victorio Conrero (1968–1982)
- Horacio Alberto Bózzoli (1983–1993)
- Raúl Arsenio Casado (1994–1999)
- Luis Héctor Villalba (1999–2011) (Cardinal in 2015)
- Alfredo Zecca (2011–2017)
- Carlos Alberto Sánchez (2017–present)

=== Coadjutor archbishop ===
- Carlos José Ñáñez (1995-1998), did not succeed to the see; appointed Archbishop of Córdoba

=== Auxiliary bishops ===
- Barnabé Piedrabuena (1907-1910), appointed Bishop of Catamarca (later returned here as Bishop)
- Carlos Echenique Altamira (1914-1922)
- Juan Carlos Aramburu (1946-1953), appointed Bishop here; future Cardinal

=== Other priests of this diocese who became bishops ===
- Luis Urbanč, appointed Coadjutor Bishop of Catamarca in 2006
- José Melitón Chávez, appointed Bishop of Añatuya in 2015

== Territorial losses ==
Year	Along with	To form
1963		Diocese of Concepción
