= Gustavo Pinedo =

Bolivian footballer (born 1988)

Personal information
- Full name: Gustavo Pinedo Zabala
- Date of birth: February 18, 1988 (age 38)
- Place of birth: Coripata, Bolivia
- Height: 1.67 m (5 ft 5 1/2 in)
- Position: Winger

Team information
- Current team: Aurora

Senior career*
Years	Team	Apps	(Gls)
2006–2007	Cádiz B	10	(3)
2007–2010	Xerez	19	(0)
2008–2009	→ Rota (loan)	15	(1)
2009–2010	→ Chornomorets Odesa (loan)	8	(1)
2010–2011	Blooming	17	(3)
2011–2012	Real Mamoré	11	(1)
2012–2013	La Paz	26	(3)
2013–2014	Universitario de Sucre	41	(14)
2014–2015	San Martín SJ	24	(1)
2015–2016	Sport Boys	12	(0)
2016	Blooming	3	(0)
2017	Universitario de Sucre	18	(0)
2017	Petrolero	17	(1)
2018–	Aurora	?	(?)

International career
2007	Bolivia	2	(0)
- * Club domestic league appearances and goals as of 17 May 2018

Gustavo Pinedo Zabala (born February 18, 1988, in Coripata) is a Bolivian footballer, who is currently playing for Club Aurora.

== Club career ==
Pinedo is a Bolivian national. He began his football career playing abroad for Spanish club Cádiz CF B in the reserve squad, however he only accumulated 10 appearances with the club. In 2007 he had a brief stint in the Segunda División with Xerez CD. Consequently, he was loaned to CD Rota and later to Ukrainian first division club Chornomorets Odesa, but Pinedo was unable to meet the expectations. During the second semester of 2010, he returned to Bolivia and signed with Blooming, which became the first native club in his career. The year Pinedo spent at Blooming can be described as poor as he made sporadic appearances mostly coming off the bench. In mid 2011 he transferred to Real Mamoré, but remained primarily in a backup role.

== International career ==
Pinedo made his debut for the Bolivia national team in a friendly against South Africa on 28 March 2007.
