= Úrsula Goyzueta =

Bolivian War of Independence heroine (1787–1854)

Úrsula Goyzueta (1787–1854) was a Bolivian heroine. Together with Vicenta Juaristi Eguino and Simona Manzaneda, she is counted as one of the three heroines of the Bolivian War of Independence.

She was the daughter of Juan Bautista Goyzueta and Nicolasa León Caricano. She married the guerrilla Eugenio Choquecallata who was a friend of Vicenta Juaristi Eguino. She was noted for her role in the defense of Santa Barbara when La Paz was conquered on 22 September 1814. She was captured on 21 November 1816 and sentenced by court martial to a fine of four thousand pesos and being obliged to walk naked tied to a donkey.
