= Uriona =

Uriona is a surname. Notable people with the surname include:

- Adolfo Armando Uriona (born 1955), prelate of the Roman Catholic Church
- Valentín Uriona (1940–1967), Spanish cyclist
