= Coroico Municipality =

- Municipality
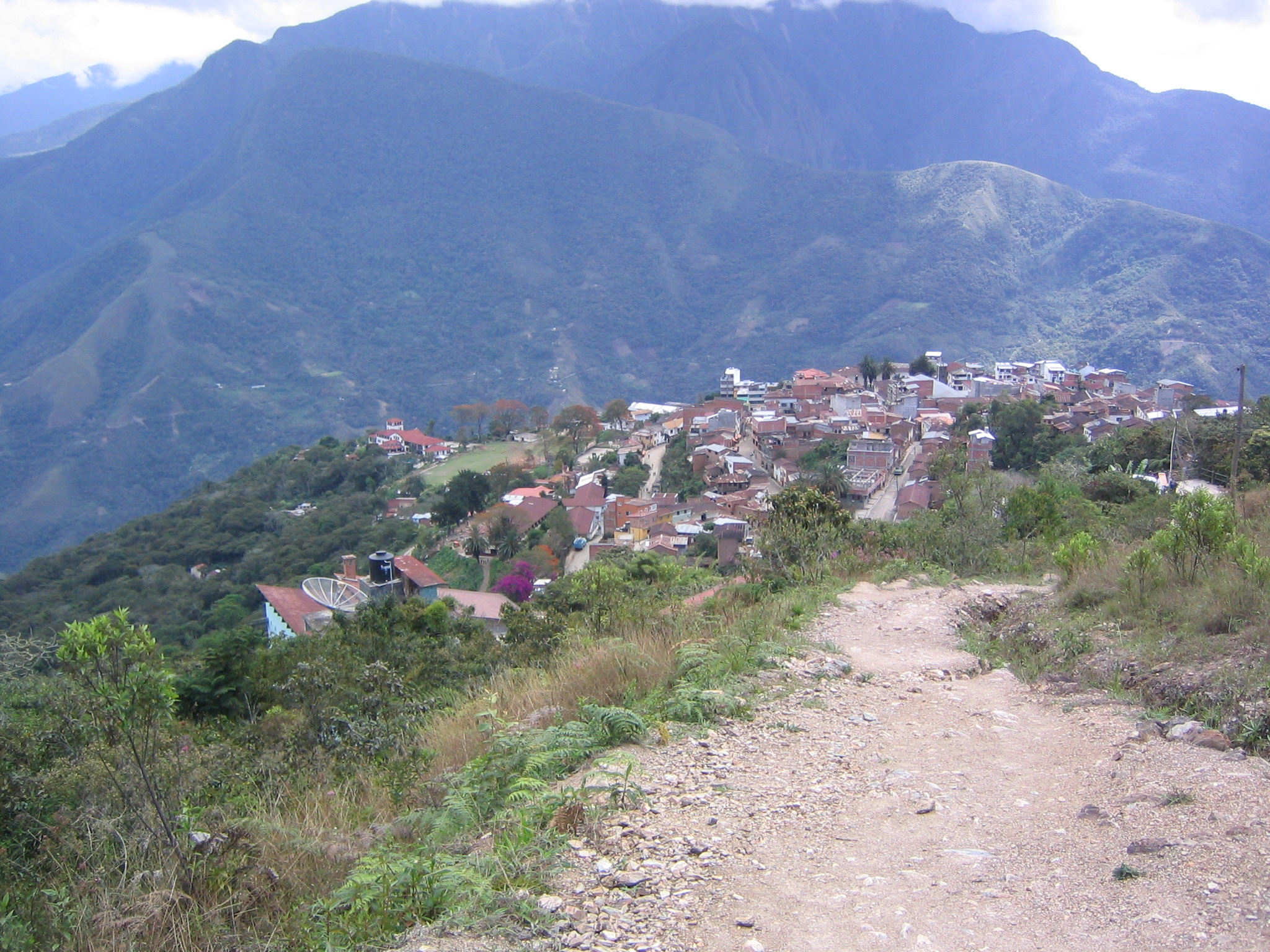
- Coroico

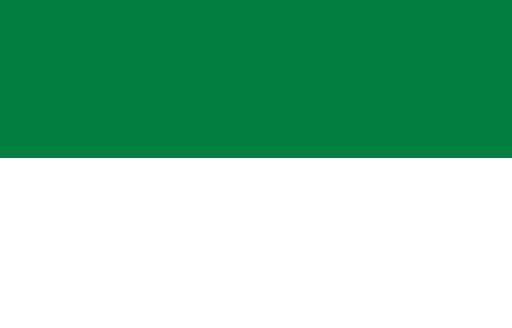
- Flag

- Location within Bolivia
- Coordinates: 16°10′S 67°50′W
- Country: Bolivia
- Department: La Paz Department
- Province: Nor Yungas Province
- Seat: Coroico

Government
  - Mayor: Manuel Yani Calle (2007)

Population (2001)
  - Total: 12,237
- Time zone: UTC-4 (BOT)

Coroico Municipality is the first municipal section of the Nor Yungas Province in the La Paz Department, Bolivia. Its seat is Coroico.

== See also ==
- Illimani
- Kimsa Warmini
- Mururata
- P'iqi Q'ara
- P'iqi Q'ara (in Coroico)
