= Rubén Callisaya =

Bolivian politician (born 1961)

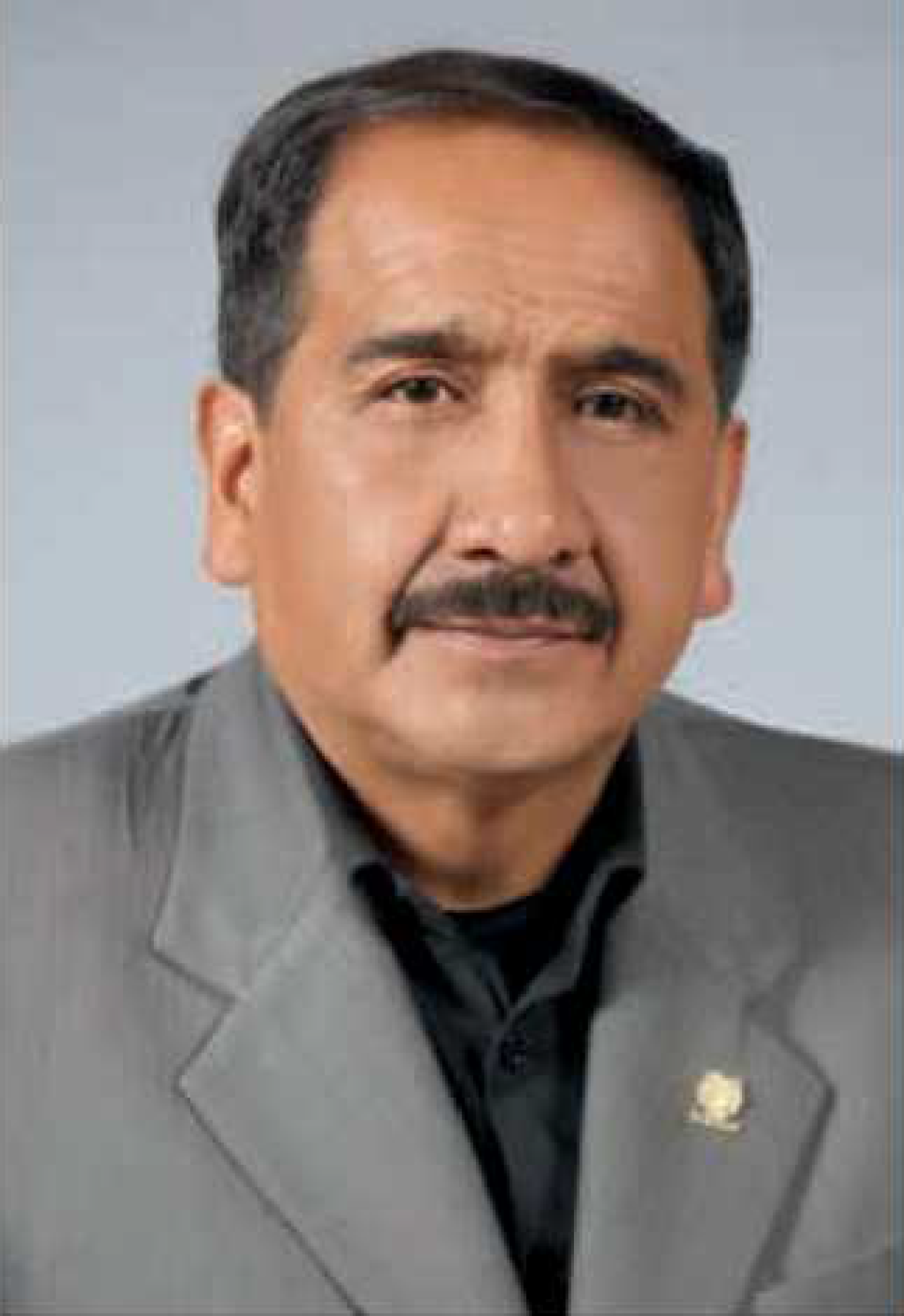
- Official portrait, 2014

Member of the Chamber of Deputies from La Paz
- In office 19 January 2010 – 18 January 2015
- Substitute: Lidia Paucara (2010–2014) (Note: Resigned from office.)
- Preceded by: Claudia Paredes
- Succeeded by: María Eugenia Calcina
- Constituency: Party list

Personal details
- Born: Donato Rubén Callisaya Mayta; 24 May 1961 (age 65) Coripata, La Paz, Bolivia
- Party: Movement for Socialism (since 1999)
- Education: Higher University of San Andrés
- Occupation: Politician; trade unionist

Donato Rubén Callisaya Mayta (born 24 May 1961) is a Bolivian politician and trade unionist who served as a party-list member of the Chamber of Deputies from La Paz from 2010 to 2015.

Callisaya was born in Coripata, a predominantly agricultural settlement dedicated to coca cultivation, and moved to the capital to attend secondary school. He abandoned law studies at the Higher University of San Andrés to pursue a career at the National State Railroad Company, where he worked for twelve years between 1985 until the enterprise's privatization in 1996.

Following his dismissal, Callisaya established himself as a share taxi driver in urban La Paz. He joined the department's drivers' federation and assumed positions of union leadership: secretary of conflicts from 1999 to 2002, then general secretary from 2003 to 2006. A member of the Movement for Socialism, Callisaya suffered two electoral defeats before being appointed counselor to the La Paz prefecture in 2008. He won a seat in the Chamber of Deputies the following year and was not nominated for reelection.

== Early life and career ==
=== Early life and education ===
Rubén Callisaya was born on 24 May 1961 in Coripata, an Aymara settlement in the Nor Yungas Province of eastern La Paz Department. The area is known for its coca cultivation: Callisaya's father, Eulogio, was a cocalero who made a living as a carrier. He made regular trips through the treacherous Yungas trail route – better known as "Death Road" – to make cargo deliveries. Cristina Mayta, Rubén's mother, was an esteemed merchant in their community.

Callisaya attended school in Coripata, where he studied through seventh-grade primary. He moved to La Paz to pursue secondary education, attending the Gualberto Villarroel School – an institute noted for catering to the country's rural migrant youth. (Note: Like many lawmakers, Callisaya took his first political steps in student leadership, where he held some positions. His first instincts, however, were to pursue a career in football: he played semi-professional Fourth and Third Division for The Strongest but did not advance further.) He paused his studies after receiving his baccalaureate to focus on work and later took them back up at the Higher University of San Andrés, where he studied law and political science for two years.

=== Career and trade unionism ===
Callisaya worked as a railroad worker at the National State Railroad Company for the better part of twelve years between 1985 and 1996. He was dismissed after the enterprise was privatized during the administration of Gonzalo Sánchez de Lozada – one of hundreds of workers who lost employment as the company was gutted by foreign consortiums.

Forced into early retirement, Callisaya found self-employment as a driver for hire. Using funds from his severance package, he purchased two minibuses, which he operated as share taxis. He joined the 1 May Departmental Federation of Drivers of La Paz shortly thereafter and gained a foothold in union politics as the organization's secretary of conflicts from 1999 to 2002. He went on to hold a succession of union posts through the early 2000s, capped by his election as general secretary of the Christ of May Mixed Transport Union in 2003 to 2006.

== Chamber of Deputies ==
=== Election ===
Callisaya became acquainted with left-wing political movements during his service in the rail industry. Already before his time as a union leader, he had received overtures to join the Revolutionary Left Movement, but talks never panned out. In 1999, he became affiliated with the Movement for Socialism (MAS), which established a long-term accord with the nation's drivers' unions. (Note: The MAS offered union leaders privileged positions on its electoral lists. The unions, in turn, mobilized their sector in support of the party and its platform. Drivers like Callisaya took part in the mass protests that toppled the government of Sánchez de Lozada in October 2003, for example.) His dual nominations for a seat in the Chamber of Deputies in the 2002 election – on the MAS's electoral list and as a substitute in single-member circumscription 7 alongside future lawmaker Cristina Rojas – both failed, as did his candidacy for the La Paz Municipal Council in 2004, where the MAS won three councillors while Callisaya was fourth on the list.

Financial constraints prevented Callisaya from running for office in the 2005 election. He gained his first political position in 2008 when – following the recall of Prefect José Luis Paredes and the appointment of Pablo Ramos – he was made departmental counselor to the prefecture, representing Murillo Province. (Note: Between 1995 and 2010, municipal councils in each province selected their representatives in the departmental council of the prefecture. This form of indirect election – along with the councils themselves – was discontinued in 2010 and replaced by departmental legislative assemblies elected by popular vote.) His term kept him in good standing with the department's drivers' unions, who, in 2009, selected him as their representative in parliament. He was the lowest-ranked candidate on the MAS's parliamentary list in the La Paz Department to win a seat.

=== Tenure ===
Callisaya served the length of his term on the Industry, Commerce, Transport, and Tourism Committee and was leader of the MAS delegation in La Paz Department from 2012 to 2013. He took part in the elaboration and passage of the General Law on Transport, a landmark piece of legislation for members of the transportation sector.

At the same time, Callisaya's term was rocked by scandal over his ties to the "Narco-Lebanese" Georges Chafic, a Lebanon-born dual national caught smuggling some 390 kilograms (860 lb) of cocaine. Per his own account, Callisaya met Chafic – a member of the MAS – through colleague deputy Samuel Pamuri; the pair granted Chafic permits to use official vehicles and even suggested him for a diplomatic role, given his Lebanese language fluency. The controversy led some in the MAS to seek the two lawmakers' suspension or even expulsion from office.

Callisaya was not nominated for reelection at the end of his term. In general, the seats afforded to the drivers' unions belonged to the sector at-large, as opposed to any single individual. Rarely were incumbents re-nominated: preference among the organizations was to rotate out their representatives. Union executive Franklin Durán – whom Callisaya had lobbied be nominated for Senate – instead succeeded him as the drivers' member for La Paz.

=== Commission assignments ===
- Plural Economy, Production, and Industry Commission
  - Industry, Commerce, Transport, and Tourism Committee (2010–2015)

== Electoral history ==
Electoral history of Rubén Callisaya
Year	Office	Party	Votes			Result	Ref.
Year	Office	Party	Total	%	P.	Result	Ref.
2002	Deputy	Movement for Socialism	Disqualified			Lost	(Note: Callisaya ranked ninth on the MAS's registered slate of party-list candidates. He no longer appeared on the National Electoral Court's final published list of qualified candidates.)
2002	Deputy	Movement for Socialism	6,910	12.20%	4th	Lost	
2004	Councillor	Movement for Socialism	74,563	19.88%	2nd	Lost	(Note: Presented on an electoral list. The data shown represents the share of the vote the entire party/alliance received in that constituency.)
2009	Deputy	Movement for Socialism	1,099,259	80.28%	1st	Won	
Source: Plurinational Electoral Organ | Electoral Atlas

Chamber of Deputies of Bolivia
Preceded by Claudia Paredes	Member of the Chamber of Deputies from La Paz; 2010–2015	Succeeded by María Eugenia Calcina
