= Diocese of Concepción =

Diocese of Concepción may refer to the following ecclesiastical jurisdictions:

- Roman Catholic Diocese of Concepción, Argentina
- Roman Catholic Archdiocese of Concepción, Chile
- Anglican Diocese of Concepción in Chile
- Roman Catholic Diocese of Concepción en Paraguay, in Paraguay
