= Mariano de Ayoroa =

Bolivian royalist

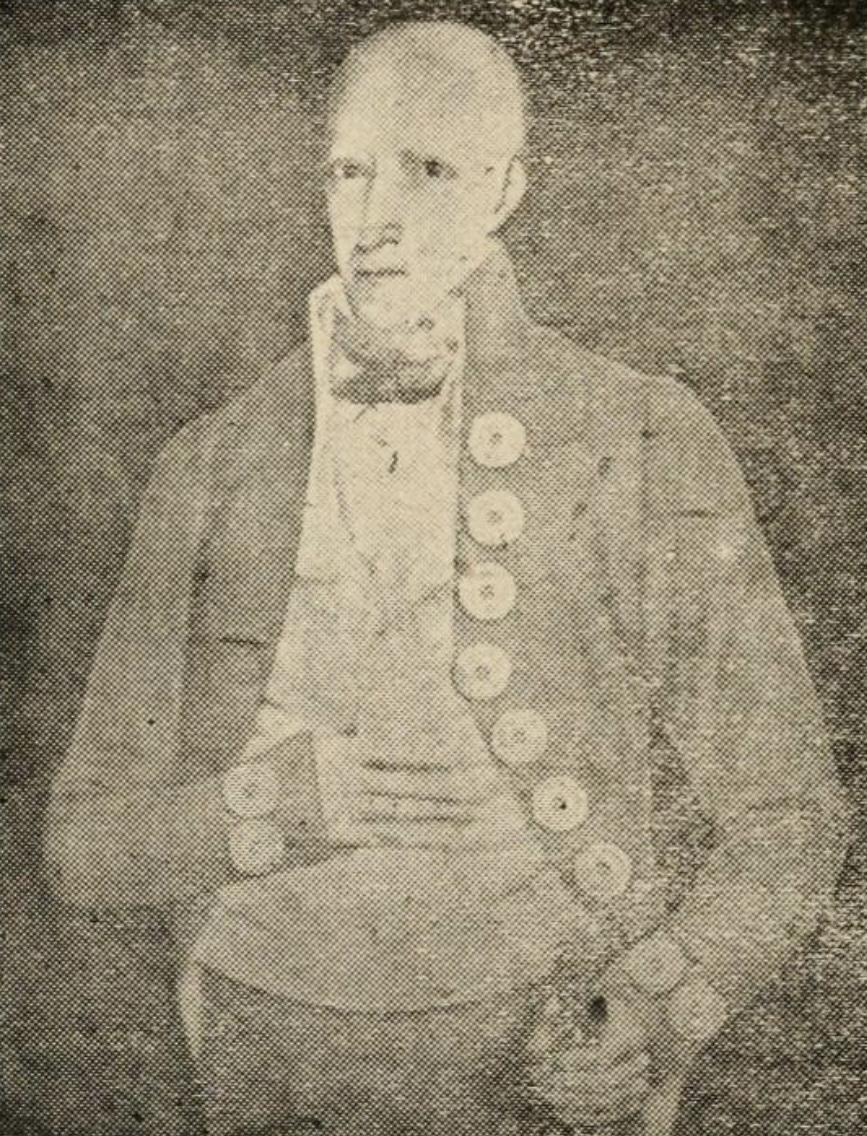
- Born: Mariano de Ayoroa y Pacheco; December 7, 1769; Coripata, Viceroyalty of Peru
- Died: May 30, 1841; La Paz, Bolivia
- Occupation: Merchant
- Political party: Royalist
- Spouse: Vicenta Juaristi Eguino
- Partner: Manuela Rojas
- Parent(s): Antonio Baltazar de Ayoroa y Bulucua; María Evarista Pacheco de Cárdenas y Salgado

Mariano de Ayoroa y Pacheco (7 December 1769 – 30 May 1841) was a Bolivian royalist who fought in favor of the Spanish during the Bolivian War of Independence. He was the estranged second husband of the criollo heroine Vicenta Juaristi Eguino, who left him three months into their marriage for his strong Spanish ties and sentiments. He is the ancestor of Bolivian president Néstor Guillén Olmos.

== Early life and family ==
Mariano de Ayoroa was born in Coripata on 7 December 1769, the son of Antonio Baltazar de Ayoroa y Bulucua, a wealthy landowner and lawyer for the Real Audiencia of Charcas, and María Evarista Pacheco de Cárdenas y Salgado, the member of a prominent family from Arequipa that descended from the founder Juan de la Torre y Díaz Chacón. His older brother, Juan Joseph de Ayoroa y Pacheco, was also a lawyer for the Real Audiencia of Charcas and Lima. Algonside his brother and father, he had served as a volunteer during the siege of the city in 1780. This was a part of the larger Rebellion of Túpac Amaru II between 1780 and 1783.

He married Vicenta Juaristi Eguino, widow of Rodrigo Flores Picón, on 1 November 1802. However, they soon became estranged due to his royalist fervor. While they were married for neary 40 years, they had no children. Instead, both had several separate relationships throughout their marriage and many illegitimate offspring. Ayoroa had a longstanding relationship with Manuela Rojas, with whom he had four children:

- Manuela Saturnina Ayoroa Rojas; married in 1841 to Manuel Faustino Asturizaga Ponce de León, a prominent lawyer, with issue.
- Matilde Ayoroa Rojas; married in 1848 to Manuel Dionisio Olmos del Carpio, a prominent lawyer, with issue. Their grandson was Néstor Guillén Olmos.
- Leandra Ayoroa Rojas; married in 1860 to José Bilbao la Vieja y Alquiza, nephew of General Dámaso Bilbao la Vieja, with issue.
- Juan Bautista Ayoroa Rojas (1841-1905); married in 1884 to Irene Valverde Ríos with issue.

Upon the death of Ayoroa in 1841, Manuel de Ayoroa y Oquendo, the son of his brother Juan Joseph, married Manuela Rojas on 3 May 1842. His nephew was a widower by then, having lost his first wife Josefa de Valverde in 1838.

== Political activity ==
Ayoroa was appointed Mayor of the Santa Hermandad of La Paz in 1802. The Viceroy of the Río de la Plata, Joaquín del Pino, appointed him second lieutenant of the 4th company of riflemen, a unit newly created on 22 December 1802, which was approved by King Charles IV on 10 August 1804. When the councilman José Montenegro had resigned his office, two candidates came forward: Joaquín Sánchez de Velasco, who offered 700 pesos in installments, and Ayoroa, who offered the amount in full.

The auction board met on 16 July 1802, under the gates of the City Council, composed of Governor Antonio Burgunyo, advisor Tadeo Fernández Dávila, and the royal treasury officials José García y Mesa, interim treasurer; Toribio Cano, the accountant; and the advocate Justo Puertas. After the three legal proclamations were made by Manuel Mamani and with no other bidders coming forward, the post was awarded to Ayoroa. The matter was brought before Viceroy Pino, who approved it on 16 December 1802, appointing Ayoroa as councilman with all privileges, with the payment of 20 pesos. His appointment was confirmed by King Ferdinand VII on 7 December 1810.

The City Council meeting of 1 January 1809, was very tumultuous, as had been the case the previous year. Ayoroa and the other councilmen strongly opposed the Governor, more with the intention of vexing him. The Governor sought the opinion of his advisor Teviera, and based on his advice, the election proceeded. In July, Ayoroa was at his estates in the Yungas, and when summoned by the Council, he returned in mid-August. He claimed that he opposed Pedro Domingo Murillo in every respect. Nevertheless, Ayoroa was still threatened with the gallows. To prove his loyalty to the King, he submitted a sworn declaration from several witnesses. After the defeat of the patriots at Huaqui and with the city under threat, he had a wall built at his own expense behind the convent of San Agustín and repaired the trenches at Las Recogidas and La Riverilla.
