= Kimsa Warmini =

Mountain in Bolivia

- Location within Bolivia

Highest point
- Elevation: 2,842 m (9,324 ft)
- Coordinates: 16°09′24″S 67°37′48″W

Geography
- Location: Bolivia; La Paz Department
- Parent range: Andes, Kimsa Warmini

Kimsa Warmini (Aymara kimsa three, warmi woman, -ni a suffix, "the one with the three women", also spelled Quimsa Huarmini) is a 2,842-metre-high (9,324 ft) mountain in the Bolivian Andes in a small range of that name. It is located in the La Paz Department, Nor Yungas Province, Coroico Municipality, northeast of Coroico. The range extends in a north-easterly direction.

Kimsa Warmini is also the name of the river which originates on the slopes of the mountain. It flows to the northeast.
