= Eguino =

Eguino is a surname of Bolivian origin. Notable people with the surname include:

- Ronald Eguino (born 1988), Bolivian footballer;
- Vicenta Juaristi Eguino (1780–1857), Bolivian soldier.
