= San Girolamo a Corviale =

St. Jerome in Corviale
- San Girolamo a Corviale (in Italian); Sancti Hieronymi in Corviale (in Latin)
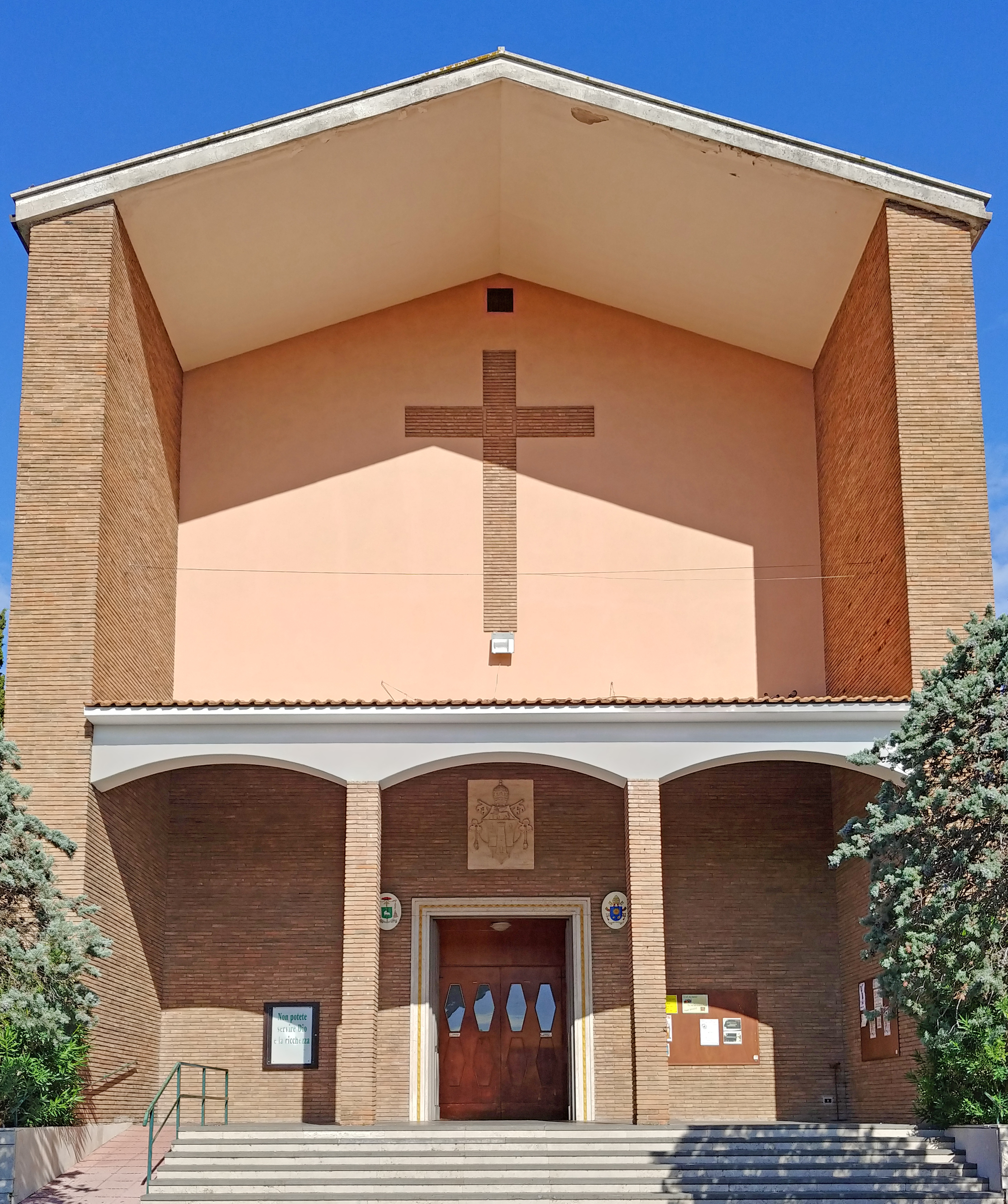
- Facade
- Click on the map for a fullscreen view
- 41°51′09″N 12°25′20″E
- Location: Via dei Buonvisi 3, Rome
- Country: Italy
- Denomination: Roman Catholic
- Tradition: Roman Rite

History
- Status: Titular church
- Dedication: Jerome

Architecture
- Architect: Francesco Fornari
- Architectural type: Church
- Style: Modernist

Administration
- District: Lazio
- Province: Rome

The Church of San Girolamo in Corviale is a church in Rome, in the suburb Gianicolense, by way of Buonvisi.

It was built in the twentieth century by the architect Francesco Fornari. It contains an important and venerated icon of the Crucifixion, with the depiction of Christ on the cross and to the sides the figures of Mary and John, typical of Eastern Christian iconography is the presence at the foot of the cross of a miniature cave and the Adam's skull.

The church is home parish, erected March 9, 1960, with the decree of the Cardinal Vicar Clemente Micara Quotidianis curis.

Pope Francis created it as a cardinal title of San Girolamo a Corviale and Luis Hector Villalba as its first titular.

== List of Cardinal Protectors ==
- Luis Hector Villalba 14 February 2014 – present
