= José Melitón Chávez =

Argentinian bishop (1957–2021)

- Bishop of Concepción
- Church: Catholic Church
- Diocese: Diocese of Concepción
- In office: 19 March 2020 – 25 May 2021
- Predecessor: Armando José María Rossi
- Successor: José Antonio Díaz
- Previous posts: Coadjutor Bishop of Concepción (2019-2020); Bishop of Añatuya (2015-2019)

Orders
- Ordination: 29 November 1985 by Horacio Alberto Bózzoli
- Consecration: 4 December 2015 by Adolfo Armando Uriona

Personal details
- Born: 2 July 1957 Romero Pozo, Tucumán Province, Argentina
- Died: 25 May 2021 (aged 63) San Miguel de Tucumán, Tucumán Province, Argentina

José Meltión Chávez (2 July 1957 – 25 May 2021) was an Argentine Roman Catholic bishop.

== Biography ==
Chávez was born in Romero Pozo, Argentina, and was ordained to the priesthood in 1985. He served as bishop of the Roman Catholic Diocese of Añatuya, Argentina, from 2015 to 2019. He then served as coadjutor bishop of the Roman Catholic Diocese of Concepción, Argentina, from 2019 to 2020 and as bishop of the Diocese from 2020 until his death from COVID-19 on 25 May 2021, in San Miguel de Tucumán during the COVID-19 pandemic in Argentina.
