= Diocese of Añatuya =

Catholic ecclesiastical territory

Coordinates: 28.4619°S 62.8368°W

Diocese of Añatuya Dioecesis Anatuyanensis Diócesis de Añatuya

Catholic
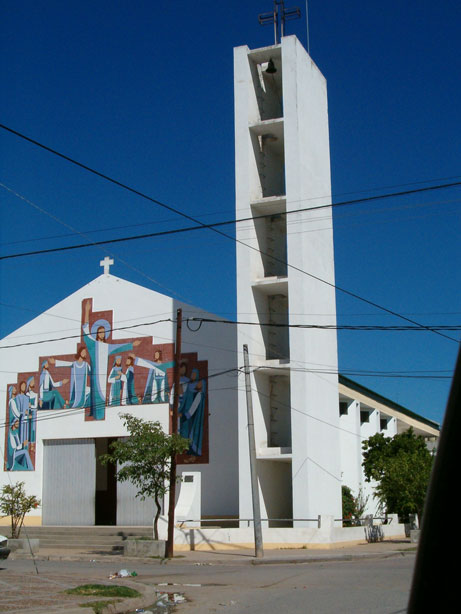
- Cathedral of Our Lady of the Valley

Location
- Country: Argentina
- Ecclesiastical province: Tucumán
- Metropolitan: Tucumán

Statistics
- Area: 68,000 km^{2} (26,000 sq mi)
- Population: Total; Catholics: (as of 2006); 147,084; 130,059 (88.4%)
- Parishes: 23

Information
- Denomination: Catholic Church
- Sui iuris church: Latin Church
- Rite: Roman Rite
- Established: 10 April 1961 (65 years ago)
- Cathedral: Cathedral of Our lady of the Valley in Añatuya
- Patron saint: St Francis Solanus; Our Lady of the Valley; St Joseph the Worker

Current leadership
- Pope: Leo XIV
- Bishop: José Luis Corral Peláez
- Metropolitan Archbishop: Carlos Alberto Sánchez
- Coadjutor: José Luis Corral

Website
- www.diocesisdeanatuya.org.ar

The Diocese of Añatuya (Latin: Dioecesis Anatuyanensis) is a Latin Church ecclesiastical territory or diocese of the Catholic Church in Argentina. It is a suffragan diocese in the ecclesiastical province of the metropolitan Archdiocese of Tucumán. The current Bishop of Añatuya is José Luis Corral Peláez.

== History ==
Erected in 1961 by Blessed John XXIII, the diocese is a suffragan of the Archdiocese of Tucumán.

== Bishops ==
=== Ordinaries ===
- Jorge Gottau, C.Ss.R. (1961–1992)
- Antonio Juan Baseotto, C.Ss.R. (1992–2002), appointed Bishop of Argentina, Military
- Adolfo Armando Uriona, F.D.P. (2004–2014), appointed Bishop of Villa de la Concepción del Río Cuarto
- José Melitón Chávez (2015-2019), appointed Coadjutor Bishop of Concepción
- José Luis Corral Peláez, S.V.D. (2019- )

=== Coadjutor bishops ===
- Antonio Juan Baseotto, C.Ss.R. (1991–1992)
- José Luis Corral Peláez, S.V.D. (2019)
