= Raúl Arsenio Casado =

- Archbishop of Tucumán
- Church: Catholic Church
- Archdiocese: Archdiocese of Tucumán
- In office: 15 June 1994 – 8 July 1999
- Predecessor: Horacio Alberto Bózzoli
- Successor: Luis Héctor Villalba
- Previous posts: Bishop of Jujuy (1983-1994); Titular Bishop of Tacapae (1975-1983); Auxiliary Bishop of Salta (1975-1983)

Orders
- Ordination: 20 December 1952
- Consecration: 16 August 1975 by Pio Laghi

Personal details
- Born: 27 July 1929 Salta, Salta Province, Argentina
- Died: 20 July 2010 (aged 80)

Raúl Arseno Casado (27 July 1927 – 20 July 2010) was the Catholic archbishop of the Roman Catholic Archdiocese of Tucumán, Argentina.

Ordained to the priesthood 20 December 1952, he was named bishop on 14 May 1975 and was ordained on 16 August 1975 serving in several dioceses.

== Notes ==
- Murió monseñor Arsenio Raúl Casado
