= Diocese of Coroico =

Catholic ecclesiastical territory

Coordinates: 16.1885°S 67.7274°W

Diocese of Coroico Dioecesis Coroicensis Diócesis de Coroico

Catholic

Location
- Country: Bolivia
- Ecclesiastical province: La Paz
- Metropolitan: La Paz

Statistics
- Area: 31,699 km^{2} (12,239 sq mi)
- Population: Total; Catholics: (as of 2006); 193,600; 171,000 (88.3%)
- Parishes: 8

Information
- Denomination: Roman Catholic
- Rite: Roman Rite
- Established: November 7, 1958 (67 years ago)
- Cathedral: Cathedral of St peter and St Paul in Coroico

Current leadership
- Pope: Leo XIV
- Bishop: Juan Carlos Huaygua Oropeza, O.P.
- Metropolitan Archbishop: Edmundo Luis Flavio Abastoflor Montero
- Bishops emeritus: Juan Vargas Aruquipa

Map

The Roman Catholic Diocese of Coroico (Latin: Dioecesis Coroicensis) is a diocese located in the city of Coroico in the ecclesiastical province of La Paz in Bolivia.

== History ==
- November 7, 1958: Established as Territorial Prelature of Coroico from the Metropolitan Archdiocese of La Paz
- July 28, 1983: Promoted as Diocese of Coroico

== Bishops ==
=== Ordinaries (in reverse chronological order) ===
- Bishops of Coroico (Roman rite)
  - Bishop Juan Carlos Huaygua Oropeza, O.P. (2022.12.03 – present)
  - Bishop Juan Vargas Aruquipa (1997.08.20 – 2022.12.03)
  - Bishop Tomás Roberto Manning, O.F.M. (1983.07.28 – 1996.10.09)
- Prelates of Coroico (Roman rite)
  - Bishop Tomás Roberto Manning, O.F.M. (1959.04.21 – 1983.07.28)

=== Auxiliary bishop ===
- Juan Vargas Aruquipa (1992-1997), appointed Bishop here

== See also ==
- Roman Catholicism in Bolivia
