= Diocese of Concepción, Argentina =

Catholic ecclesiastical territory

Coordinates: 27.3461°S 65.5934°W

Diocese of Concepción Dioecesis Sanctissimae Concepionis in Argentina Diócesis de Concepción

Catholic
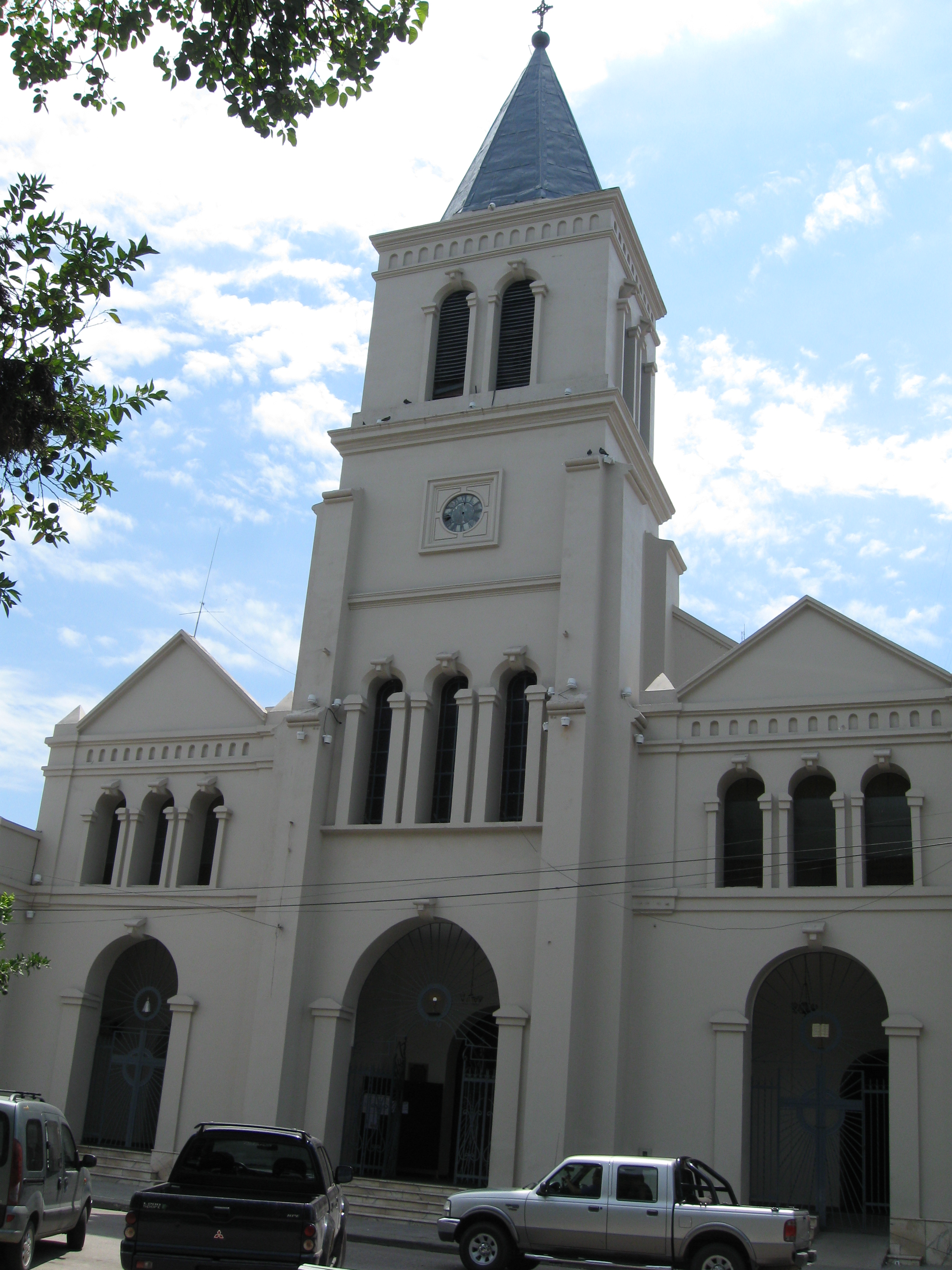
- Cathedral of the Immaculate Conception

Location
- Country: Argentina
- Ecclesiastical province: Tucumán
- Metropolitan: Tucumán

Statistics
- Area: 11,600 km^{2} (4,500 sq mi)
- Population: Total; Catholics: (as of 2006); 320,000; 291,600 (91.1%)
- Parishes: 19

Information
- Denomination: Roman Catholic
- Rite: Roman Rite
- Established: 12 August 1963 (63 years ago)
- Cathedral: Cathedral of the Immaculate Conception in Concepción, Tucumán
- Patron saint: Immaculate Conception; St John the Baptist

Current leadership
- Pope: Leo XIV
- Bishop: José Antonio Díaz
- Metropolitan Archbishop: Carlos Alberto Sánchez
- Bishops emeritus: Armando José María Rossi, O.P.

The Roman Catholic Diocese of Concepción (Latin: Dioecesis Sanctissimae Concepionis in Argentina) is in Argentina and is a suffragan of the Archdiocese of Tucumán.

== History ==
On 12 August 1963 Saint John XXIII founded the Diocese of Concepción from territory taken from the Archdiocese of Tucumán.

== Bishops ==
=== Ordinaries ===
- Juan Carlos Ferro (1963–1980)
- Jorge Arturo Meinvielle, S.D.B. (1980–1991), appointed Bishop of San Justo
- Bernardo Enrique Witte, O.M.I. (1992–2001)
- Armando José María Rossi, O.P. (2001–2020)
- José Melitón Chávez (2020–2021)
- José Antonio Díaz (2021–present)

=== Coadjutor bishops ===
- Armando José María Rossi, O.P. (2000–2001)
- José Melitón Chávez (2019–2020)
