= Luis Héctor Villalba =

Argentine prelate

His Eminence Luis Hector Villalba
- Cardinal, Archbishop Emeritus of Tucuman
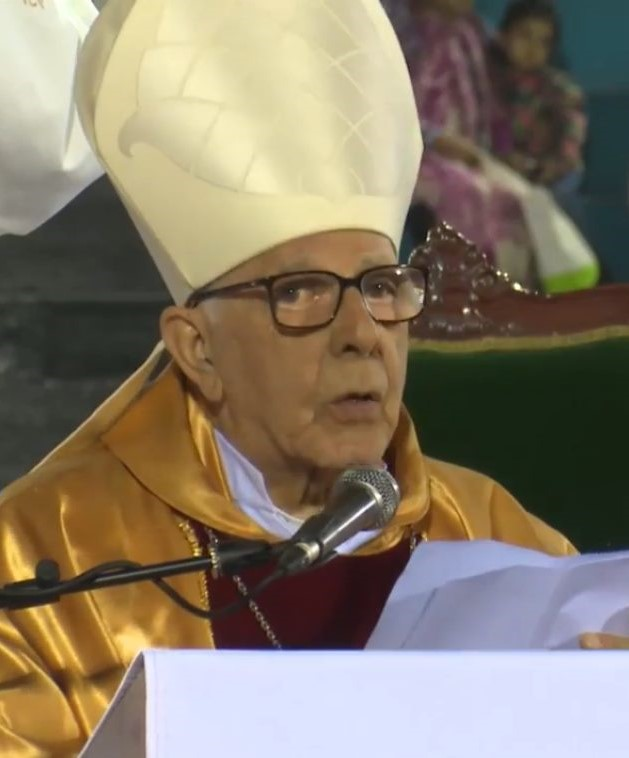
- Province: Tucuman
- See: Tucuman
- Appointed: 8 July 1999
- Term ended: 10 June 2011
- Predecessor: Raul Arsenio Casado
- Successor: Alfredo Horacio Zecca
- Other post: Cardinal-Priest of San Girolamo a Corviale
- Previous posts: Auxiliary Bishop of Buenos Aires (1984–1991); Bishop of San Martin (1991–1999); Archbishop of Tucuman (1999–2011)

Orders
- Ordination: 24 September 1960
- Consecration: 22 December 1984 by Juan Carlos Aramburu
- Created cardinal: 14 February 2015 by Pope Francis

Personal details
- Born: Luis Hector Villalba; 11 October 1934 (age 91) Buenos Aires, Argentina
- Denomination: Roman Catholic
- Motto: Apostol de Jesucristo (Apostle of Jesus Christ)
- Coat of arms

Ordination history of Luis Héctor Villalba
History
Priestly ordination
- Date: 24 September 1960
Episcopal consecration
- Principal consecrator: Juan Carlos Aramburu
- Co-consecrators: Arnaldo Clemente Canale; Carmelo Juan Giaquinta
- Date: 22 December 1984
Cardinalate
- Elevated by: Pope Francis
- Date: 14 February 2015
Episcopal succession
Bishops consecrated by Luis Héctor Villalba as principal consecrator
- Luis Urbanc: 10 March 2007
- Carlos Alberto Sánchez: 14 October 2017

Styles of Luis Hector Villalba
- Reference style: His Eminence
- Spoken style: Your Eminence
- Religious style: Cardinal
- Informal style: Cardinal

Luis Héctor Villalba (Spanish pronunciation: [lwis ˈeɣtoɾ βiˈʝalβa]; born 11 October 1934) is an Argentine prelate of the Roman Catholic Church who was the Archbishop of Tucumán from 1999 to 2011. He was an auxiliary bishop of Buenos Aires from 1984 to 1991 and bishop of San Martin from 1991 to 1999.

== Education ==
Luis Héctor Villalba was born on 11 October 1934. He completed his primary and secondary education in Buenos Aires. He entered the Metropolitan Seminary of Buenos Aires (Villa Devoto) in 1952 after earning the title of mercantile peritus in state schools. In 1961, he obtained licentiates in theology and ecclesiastical history at the Pontifical Gregorian University, Rome.

== Episcopate ==
He was ordained a priest on 24 September 1960.

In 1961 he obtained a licentiate in theology and Church history from the Pontifical Gregorian University.

In 1967 he was appointed as prefect of the major seminary and professor in the Faculty of Theology at the Catholic University of Buenos Aires. In 1968 he became the first director of the San José vocational institute, where candidates to the priesthood of the archdiocese prepared for courses in philosophy and theology. From 1969 to 1971 he served as dean of the faculty of theology, and in 1972 he was appointed as parish priest of Santa Rosa da Lima in Buenos Aires.

On 20 October 1984 he was assigned the titular see of Ofena and appointed as auxiliary of Buenos Aires.

On 16 July 1991 he was transferred to the diocese of San Martin.

He served as metropolitan archbishop of Tucumán from 8 July 1999 to 10 June 2011. He was the first deputy president of the Episcopal Conference of Argentina for two consecutive mandates (2005–2008 and 2008–2011), under the presidency of the then-archbishop of Buenos Aires, Cardinal Jorge Mario Bergoglio. Previously he had been president of the Episcopal Commission for Catechesis and a member of the Commission for the Lay Apostolate.

== Cardinal ==
On 4 January 2015, Pope Francis announced that he would make him a cardinal on 14 February. At that ceremony, he was assigned the titular church of San Girolamo a Corviale. On September 4, 2021, Villalba in his role as papal representative presided over the rite of beatification of Fray Mamerto Esquiú.

== See also ==
- Cardinals created by Pope Francis

Catholic Church titles
| Preceded by Manuel Menedez | Bishop of San Martin; 1991–1999 | Succeeded by Raul Omar Rossi |
| Preceded by Raúl Arsenio Casado | Archbishop of Tucumán; 1999–2011 | Succeeded by Alfredo Zecca |
| Preceded by titular church established | Cardinal Priest of San Girolamo a Corviale; 2015–present | Incumbent |
