= Coripata Municipality =

Coripata Quripata
- Municipality
- Location within Bolivia
- Coordinates: 16°10′S 67°35′W
- Country: Bolivia
- Department: La Paz Department
- Province: Nor Yungas Province
- Seat: Coripata
- Time zone: UTC-4 (BOT)

Coripata Municipality is the second municipal section of the Nor Yungas Province in the La Paz Department, Bolivia. Its seat is Coripata.

== See also ==
- P'iqi Q'ara
