= Unidad Académica Campesina-Carmen Pampa =

University in Bolivia

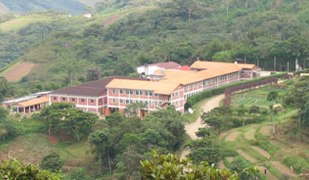
- Upper campus of the UAC-Carmen Pampa (Campus Leahy)
- Motto: Apredizaje es Metanoia
- Motto in English: Learning is metanoia
- Established: 1993
- Affiliations: Catholic University of Bolivia
- President: Msgr. Juan Carlos Huaygua Oropeza (Bishop of Coroico)
- Director: Fr. Mario Alanoca
- Academic Director: Jose Luis Beltran
- Academic staff: 5
- Administrative staff: 30
- Students: 727 (2018)
- Location: Carmen Pampa, Nor Yungas Province, Bolivia; 16.25825°S 67.69175°W
- Campus: Rural
- Colours: Blue and Gold
- Website: www.uac-cp.edu.bo

The Unidad Académica Campesina-Carmen Pampa (UAC-Carmen Pampa) is a satellite campus of the Catholic University of Bolivia founded in 1993 to serve the rural poor of Bolivia. It is located in Carmen Pampa, a small farming community 12 km. from the town of Coroico.

== History ==
The UAC-Carmen Pampa was founded on October 3, 1993, by Sister Damon Nolan, a nun of the Missionary Franciscan Sisters of the Immaculate Conception of the Third Order of Saint Francis. It started as part of a consortium of rural campuses of the Catholic University of Bolivia called UACs (Unidades Académicas Campesinas), created to educate the rural poor, and in 2010 became an independent satellite campus of the Catholic University of Bolivia. The university first offered technical degrees in agronomy, veterinary/animal science and nursing. In 1998 the UAC-Carmen Pampa augmented its offering to a licenciatura (BS-equivalent). In 2003 the UAC-Carmen Pampa began offering a licenciatura degree in primary education. In 2006 the UAC-Carmen Pampa started a technical degree in ecotourism, which became a licenciatura degree offering in 2013. The UAC-Carmen Pampa also offers a remedial one semester program of college preparatory classes called pre-university.

In 1999, the Carmen Pampa Fund was established to provide support for the UAC-Carmen Pampa. It is located in St. Paul, Minnesota. The UAC-Carmen Pampa also received significant support from USAID since 2001 until USAID's expulsion from Bolivia in 2013.

In 2003, the United Nations recognized the UAC-Carmen Pampa as an institution with "best practices in poverty eradication." The UAC-Carmen Pampa has also been recognized for its efforts toward ending poverty and increasing profitability and food sovereignty for rural people, and its graduates accomplishing the same. In May 2011, the education and health committee of the Legislative Assembly of Bolivia recognized each of the UACs as an Institución Meritoria del Estado (Meritorious Institution of the State) for their work in higher education. The UAC-Carmen Pampa has also been recognized by the Center for Education Innovations.

== Mission ==
The mission of the UAC-Carmen Pampa is make higher education available to young people of rural areas and those who are, for whatever reason, are unable to pursue such studies; prepare men and women who, inspired by principals of Christian vocation, are called to the service of others, with a high quality professional training and a commitment to Christian principals to guide their decisions; be in constant search for truth and goodness by way of learning/apprenticeship, research, and community extension; develop extension programs through specific projects that meet the needs felt in our communities; and integrate the successes of the university community into the countryside, strengthening and developing progress and socio-economic liberation, through academic, research and extension activities.
