= San Miguel de Tucumán Cathedral =

Coordinates: 26.8314°S 65.2034°W

Our Lady of the Incarnation Cathedral
- Catedral de Nuestra Señora de la Encarnación de San Miguel de Tucumán
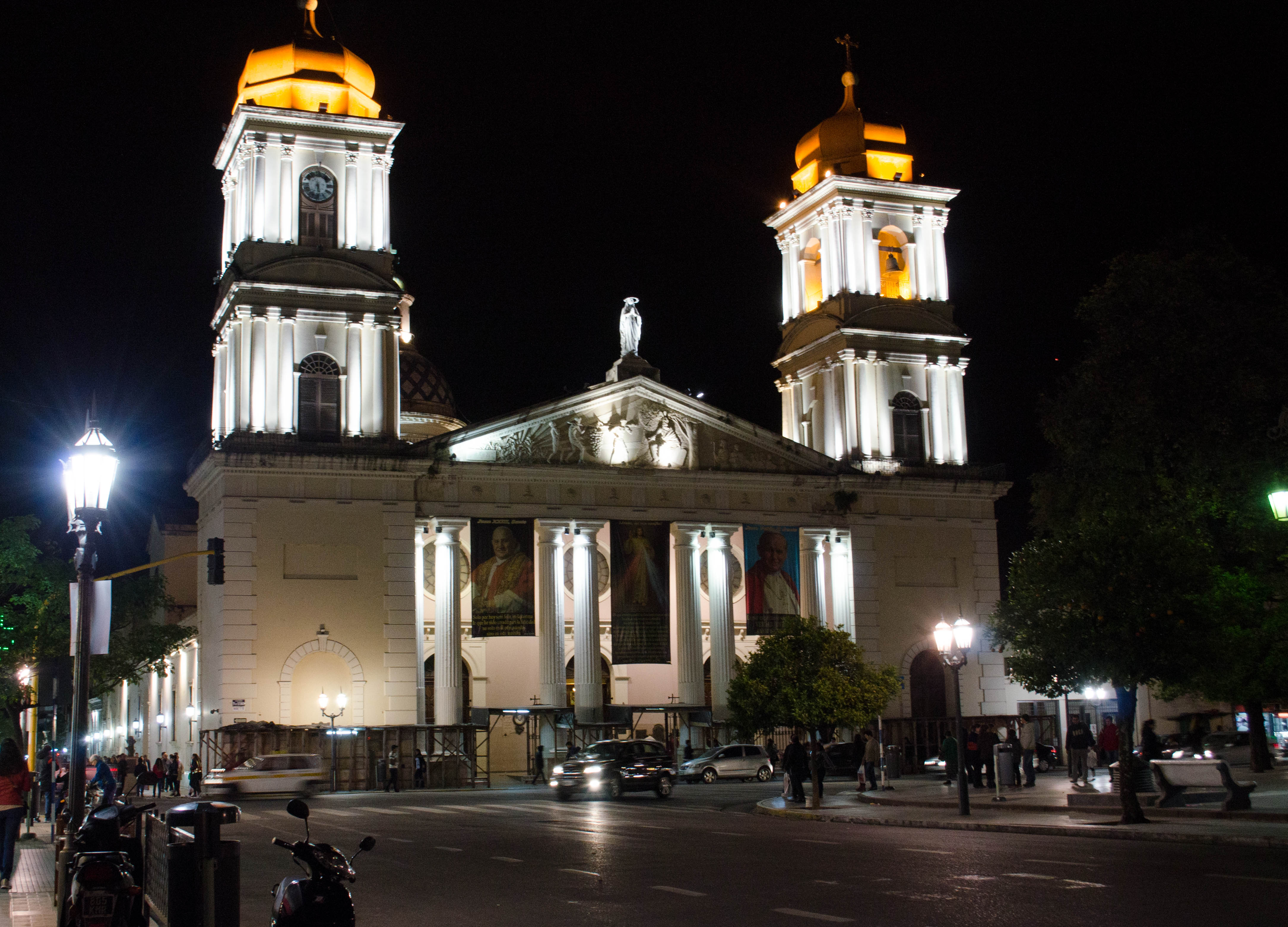
- Our Lady of the Incarnation Cathedral
- Location: San Miguel de Tucumán
- Country: Argentina
- Denomination: Roman Catholic Church

The Our Lady of the Incarnation Cathedral (Spanish: Catedral de Nuestra Señora de la Encarnación de San Miguel de Tucumán), also called San Miguel de Tucumán Cathedral, is the mother church of the city of San Miguel de Tucuman, in the province of Tucuman, in the South American country of Argentina. The temple was founded in the seventeenth century and is home to the metropolitan Archdiocese of Tucumán since 1897.

The foundations of this cathedral building date from the period of the definitive founding of the city of San Miguel de Tucuman in 1685, long remained a humble building adobes with gabled of "musleras tiles" then keeping some simple style details Hispanic American colonial baroque.

In the mid-nineteenth century it is that parts began with the plans of the architect of Basque origin and French Pierre Etcheverry, such work is what has left virtually the building with the current appearance, being developed for the provincial government of Celedonio Gutierrez and inaugurated on February 19, 1856.

== See also ==
- Roman Catholicism in Argentina

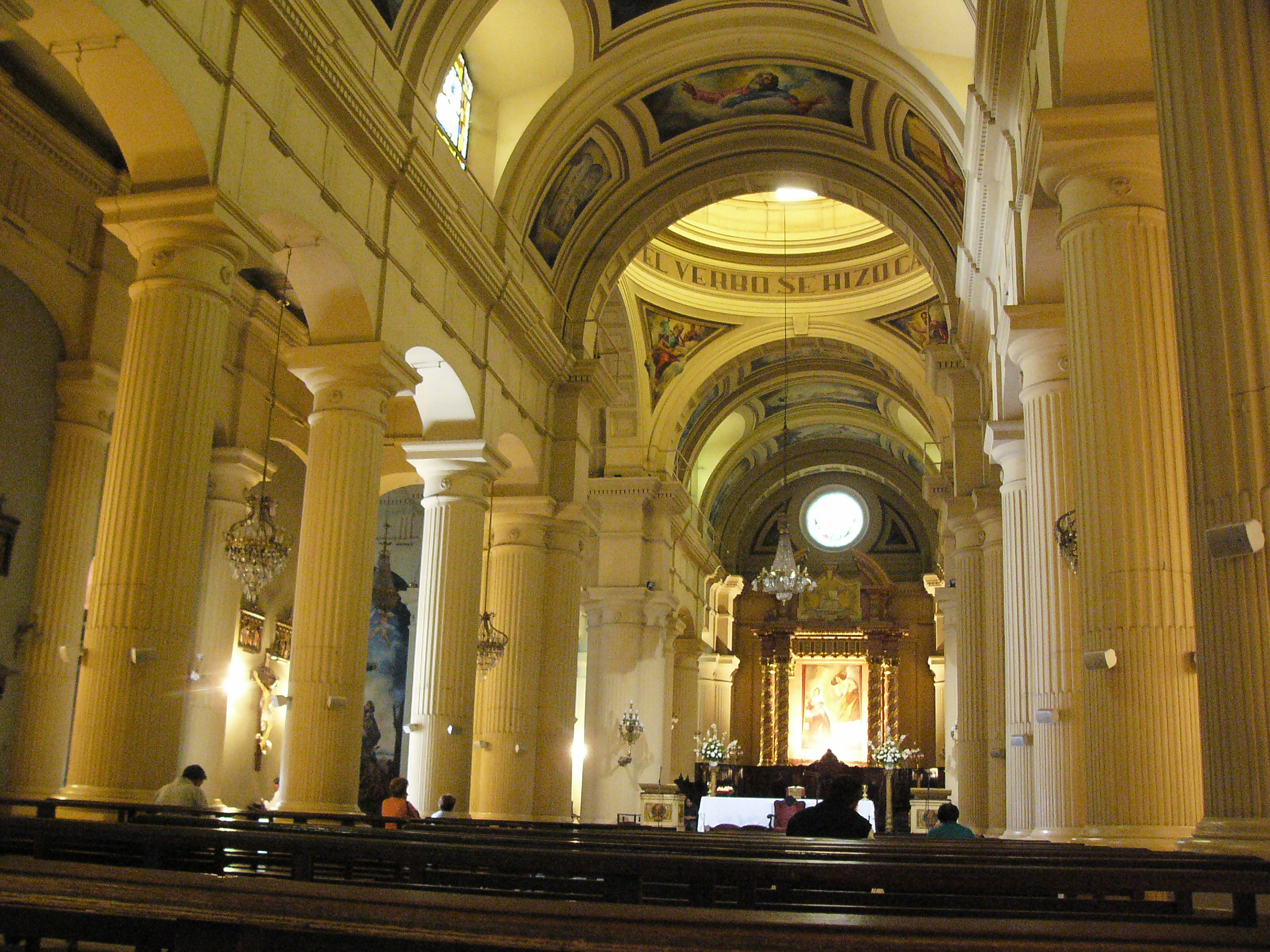
Internal View
