= Vicenta Juaristi Eguino =

Bolivian heroine

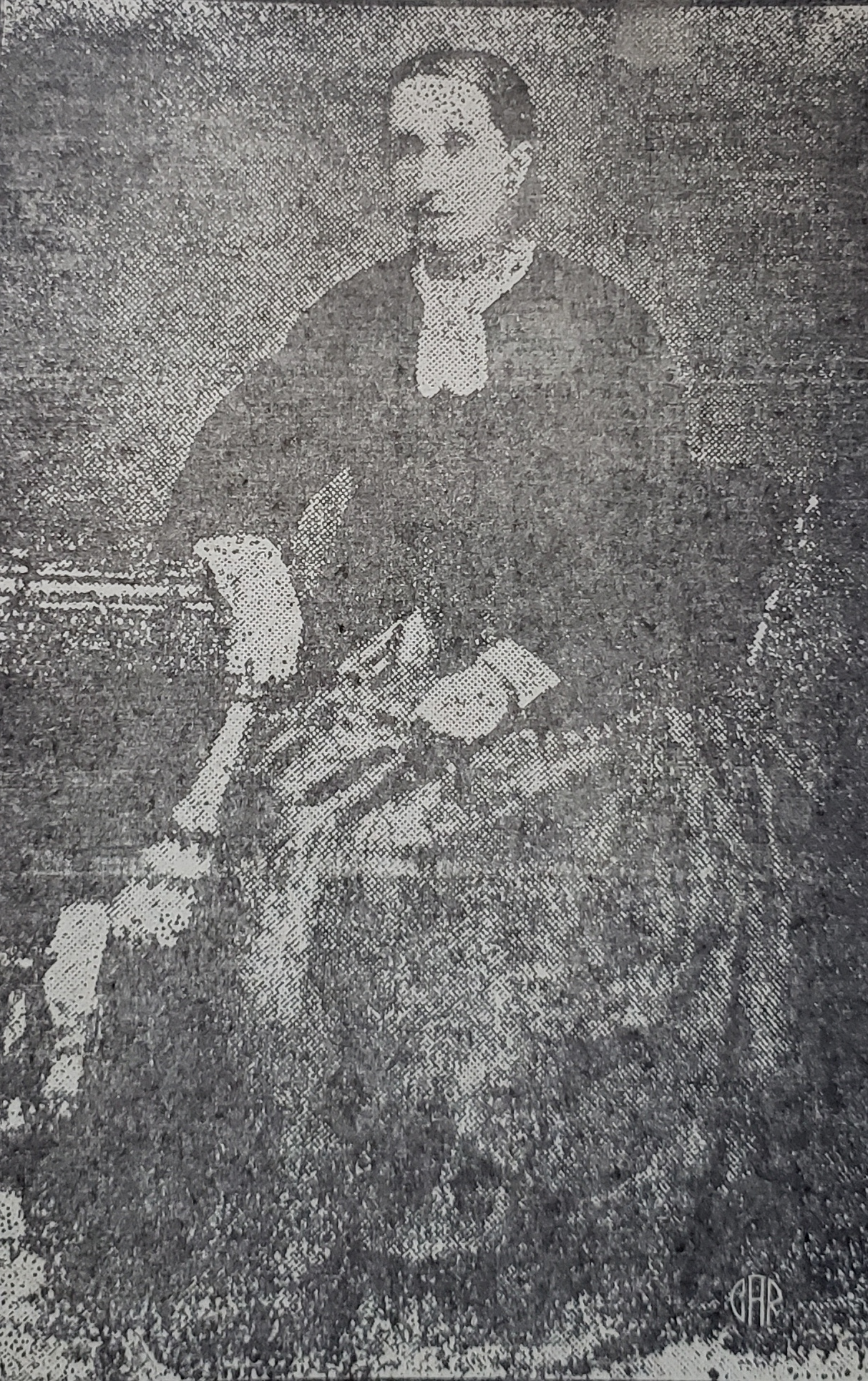

Vicenta Juaristi Eguino (1780-1857) was a Bolivian women involved in the movement to end Spanish rule in what is now Bolivia. Together with Úrsula Goyzueta and Simona Manzaneda, she is counted as one of the three heroines of the Bolivian War of Independence.

== Biography ==
Vincenta's mother died in childbirth, so she was raised by her brother Pedro Eguino, who trained her in the ideals and feelings of freedom. She married Rodríguez Flores de Picón while she was still very young. After his death from an illness, she married Mariano de Ayoroa.

In 1809, Vicenta decided to put her properties and the large fortune to which she was heir to the service of the revolution, and her house was the center of several clandestine meetings of the patriots.

In those years, she maintained a relationship with José Calderón y Sanjinés, who had fought alongside Marshal Sucre in Ayacucho and was later part of the signing of the Chuquisaca Act that gave independence to Upper Peru.

Identified as a rebel, she was sentenced to prison on numerous occasions. General José Manuel de Goyeneche banished her to Cuzco under a fine of six thousand pesos, and later she could return to La Paz, taking refuge in one of her farms in Río Abajo. She was also sentenced to death by Mariano Ricafort, although she avoided the maximum penalty thanks to the popular support of the citizens of La Paz and the intervention of several royalist leaders, who managed to have her sentence commuted to a large fine and perpetual exile to Cuzco.

Once the Bolivian War of Independence was over, on August 18, 1825, Vicenta gave Simón Bolívar the golden key of the city, as well as a silver garland studded with precious stones that she had made.

Vincenta died on March 14, 1857, at the age of 72. Upon her death, she received solemn funeral honors by the government of General Jorge Córdova. In La Paz, there is a square dedicated to her memory with a statue of Vicenta sculpted by Victor Hugo Barrenechea, inaugurated on December 11, 1975.
