= Alfredo Zecca =

Argentine Roman Catholic archbishop (1949–2022)

The Most Reverend Alfredo Zecca
- Titular Archbishop of Volsinium
- Appointed: 9 June 2017
- Term ended: 4 November 2022
- Predecessor: Justo Mullor García
- Successor: Vacant
- Previous post: Archbishop of Tucumán (2011–2017)

Orders
- Ordination: 19 November 1976 by Juan Carlos Aramburu
- Consecration: 18 August 2011 by Jorge Mario Bergoglio

Personal details
- Born: 27 September 1949 Buenos Aires, Argentina
- Died: 4 November 2022 (aged 73)
- Motto: VOBIS EPISCOPUS, VOBISCUM CHRISTIANUS
- Coat of arms

Styles of Alfredo Zecca
- Reference style: Alfredo Zecca: His Excellency; The Most Reverend
- Spoken style: Your Excellency
- Religious style: Archbishop

Alfredo Horacio Zecca (27 September 1949 – 4 November 2022) was an Argentine prelate of the Roman Catholic Church. He served as archbishop of Tucumán from 2011 to 2017, when he resigned for health reasons.

== Life ==
Zecca was born in Buenos Aires, and ordained to the priesthood on 19 November 1976.

Zecca was named a consultor to the Congregation for Catholic Education on 29 January 2005, and a member of that Congregation on 12 June 2012.

On 10 June 2011, he was appointed Archbishop of Tucumán following the retirement of Archbishop Luis Héctor Villalba.

Zecca received his episcopal consecration on 11 August from Jorge Mario Cardinal Bergoglio (later Pope Francis), Archbishop of Buenos Aires. Serving as co-consecrators were Estanislao Esteban Cardinal Karlic, Archbishop Emeritus of Paraná, Eduardo Vicente Mirás, Archbishop Emeritus of Rosario, Luis Héctor Villalba, Archbishop Emeritus of Tucumán, and Ariel Edgardo Torrado Mosconi, Auxiliary Bishop of Santiago del Estero. He was installed in Tucumán on 17 September 2011.

Zecca met with Pope Francis in February 2017 and submitted his resignation on 19 March. Pope Francis accepted his resignation as archbishop for health reasons on 9 June 2017, when Zecca was 67, assigning him the titular see of Volsinium. Rather than allowing him to become Archbishop Emeritus, as is normal in cases of retirement, he was assigned the titular see of Volsinium and remained an active bishop. According to some reports, Pope Francis removed Zecca, not for health reasons but because he had accepted the government authorities' ruling of suicide in the case of a priest who had been a longtime campaigner against drug traffickers was found hanged on 5 October 2016.

Zecca died from heart failure on 4 November 2022, at the age of 73.

Catholic Church titles
Preceded by Justo Mullor García	Tituar Archbishop of Volsinium; 2017–2022	Succeeded by Gian Luca Perici
Preceded by Luis Héctor Villalba	Archbishop of Tucumán; 2011–2017	Succeeded by Carlos Alberto Sánchez
