= Bita (Mauretania) =

Africa Proconsularis (125 AD).

Bita was an ancient city and former Roman Catholic diocese in the Roman province of Africa Proconsularis. It is now a Latin Catholic titular see.

== History ==
Bita was important enough in the Roman province of Mauretania Caesariensis to become a suffragan of its capital Caesarea Mauretaniae's Metropolitan Archbishop. However it would fade.

== Titular see ==
The diocese was nominally restored in 1931 as a Latin Catholic titular bishopric, but has had a single Eastern Catholic incumbent.

It has had the following incumbents, generally of the lowest (episcopal) rank, except the latest (who was promoted to archiepiscopal, the intermediary rank) :

- Giovanni Riegler, Comboni Missionaries of the Heart of Jesus (F.S.C.I.) (1948.12.09 – 1951.01.11)
- Thomas Joseph Danehy, Maryknoll Fathers (M.M.) (1952.11.27 – 1959.10.09)
- Victorio Manuel Bonamín, Salesians (S.D.B.) (1960.01.27 – 1991.11.11)
- Juan Vargas Aruquipa (1992.01.15 – 1997.08.20)
- Berhaneyesus Demerew Souraphiel, Lazarists (C.M.) (1997.11.07 – 1999.07.07) as Auxiliary Eparch of Addis Abeba of the Ethiopics (Ethiopia) (1997.11.07 – 1999.07.07), President of Council of the Ethiopian Church (1998 – ...), next Apostolic Administrator of Addis Abeba of the Ethiopics (1998.06.16 – 1999.07.07); previously Apostolic Prefect of Jimma–Bonga (Ethiopia) (1994 – 1997.11.07); later Metropolitan Archeparch sui iuris of Addis Abeba of the Ethiopics (Ethiopia) (1999.07.07 – ...), President of Ethiopian and Eritrean Episcopal Conference (1999 – ...), President of Association of Member Episcopal Conferences in Eastern Africa (2014.07.24 – ...), created Cardinal-Priest of S. Romano Martire (2015.02.14 [2015.10.18] – ...)
- Tomáš Galis (1999.08.28 – 2008.02.14)
- Frans Daneels, Norbertines (O. Praem.) (2008.04.12 – 2012.10.10 see below)
- Titular Archbishop Frans Daneels, O. Praem. (see above 2012.10.10 – ...), Secretary of Supreme Tribunal of the Apostolic Signatura; previously Substitute Promoter of Justice (1987 – 1989.04) and Promoter of Justice of Supreme Tribunal of the Apostolic Signatura (1989.04 – 2008.04.12)

== See also ==
- Bida (North Africa), previously also called Bita, in Numidia
- Catholic Church in Algeria
