= P'iqi Q'ara =

Mountain in Bolivia

- Location within Bolivia

Highest point
- Elevation: 3,722 m (12,211 ft)
- Coordinates: 16°19′28″S 67°48′00″W

Geography
- Location: Bolivia, La Paz Department, Nor Yungas Province, Coripata Municipality, Coroico Municipality
- Parent range: Andes

P'iqi Q'ara (Aymara p'iqi, p'iq'iña, phiq'i, phiq'iña head, q'ara bald, bare, "bald-headed", also spelled Pekhe Khara) is a 3,722-metre-high (12,211 ft) mountain in the Andes of Bolivia. It is located in the La Paz Department, Nor Yungas Province, on the border of the municipalities of Coripata and Coroico.
