= P'iqi Q'ara (Coroico) =

Mountain

- Location within Bolivia

Highest point
- Elevation: 2,672 m (8,766 ft)
- Coordinates: 16°18′18″S 67°46′24″W

Geography
- Location: Bolivia, La Paz Department, Nor Yungas Province, Coroico Municipality
- Parent range: Andes

P'iqi Q'ara (Aymara p'iqi, p'iq'iña, phiq'i, phiq'iña head, q'ara bald, bare, "bald-headed", also spelled Pekhe Khara) is a 2,672-metre-high (8,766 ft) mountain in the Andes of Bolivia. It is located in the La Paz Department, Nor Yungas Province, Coroico Municipality.
