= Simona Manzaneda =

Bolivian heroine

Simona Manzaneda (c. 1770-1816) was a Bolivian woman involved in the Bolivian War of Independence.
