= Carlos Alberto Sánchez =

Argentine prelate of the Catholic Church (born 1963)

His Excellency, The Most Reverend Carlos Alberto Sánchez
- Archbishop of Tucumán
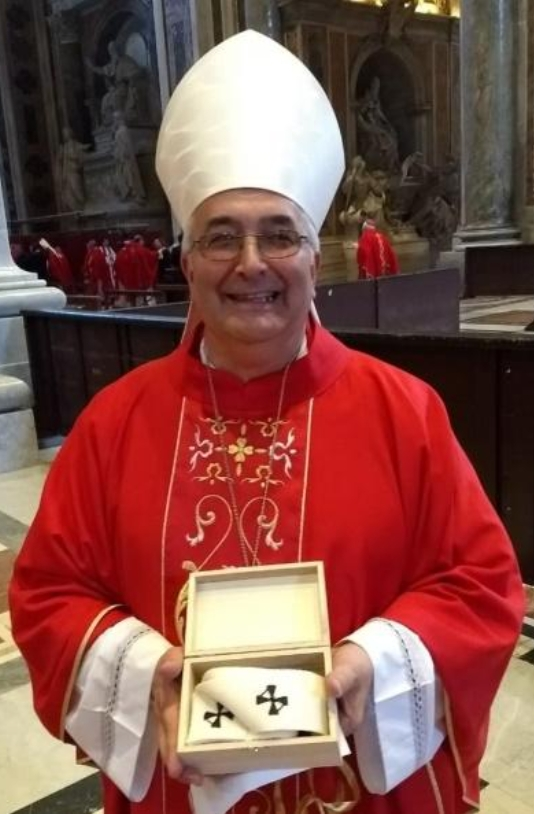
- Appointed: 23 August 2017
- Installed: 13 October 2017
- Predecessor: Alfredo Horacio Zecca

Orders
- Ordination: 24 June 1988 by Horacio Alberto Bózzoli
- Consecration: 13 October 2017 by Luis Héctor Villalba,

Personal details
- Born: April 24, 1963 (age 63)
- Denomination: Roman Catholic Church
- Motto: Estoy entre ustedes como el que sirve
- Coat of arms

Carlos Alberto Sánchez (born 24 April 1963) is an Argentine prelate of the Catholic Church. He has been Archbishop of Tucumán since 2017.

== Biography ==
Carlos Alberto Sánchez was born on 24 April 1963 in San Miguel de Tucumán. He attended the Minor Seminary of Saint Joseph and then studied philosophy and theology at the Major Seminary of Our Lady of Mercy and Saint Joseph.

He was ordained a priest on 24 June 1988 by Horacio Alberto Bózzoli, Archbishop of Tucumán. He held several parish assignments, was spiritual director and rector of the major seminary from 2007 to 2011, and episcopal vicar for pastoral care from 2012 to 2014. Beginning in 2011, he was a parish pastor, taught at the major seminary, and served on several diocesan committees. Pope Francis named him Archbishop of Tucumán on 23 August 2017. He was consecrated a bishop by Cardinal Luis Hector Villalba and installed there on 13 October before a crowd of 15,000 in the local soccer team's stadium (el estadio de Atlético). He chose as his episcopal motto "Estoy entre ustedes como el que sirve" (I am among you as one who serves) from Luke 22:27.

In November 2017, he spoke of Juan Viroche, a priest whose murder in 2016 was accepted by his predecessor as a suicide, as someone who gave his life fighting drug trafficking. In April 2018, he and other local bishops defended those who argued that religious education in public schools represented a form of discrimination while arguing that such education was rooted in the provincial constitution. He said such education aided "integration among different religions" and that even those who opposed religious education could see the value of teaching "values". Their statement said that since everyone should support "a school that includes all of us ... we want to open a space for dialogue with interested people".

Catholic Church titles
Preceded by Alfredo Horacio Zecca	Archbishop of Tucumán; 2017–present	Succeeded by Incumbent
