= Adolfo Armando Uriona =

Roman Catholic Church prelate

Adolfo Armando Uriona F.D.P.
- Bishop of Villa de la Concepción del Río Cuarto
- Church: Catholic Church
- Diocese: Diocese of Villa de la Concepción del Río Cuarto
- Appointed: 4 November 2014
- Predecessor: Eduardo Eliseo Martín
- Previous post: Bishop of Añatuya (2004-2014)

Orders
- Ordination: 28 June 1980
- Consecration: 8 May 2004 by Jorge Mario Bergoglio

Personal details
- Born: 27 May 1955 (age 70) Mar del Plata, Buenos Aires Province, Argentina
- Coat of arms

Adolfo Armando Uriona F.D.P. (born 27 May 1955) is a prelate of the Roman Catholic Church. He served as bishop of Añatuya from 2004 to 2014.

== Life ==
Born in Mar del Plata, Uriona became a member of the Sons of Divine Providence on 8 March 1979. He was ordained to the priesthood on 28 June 1980.

On 4 March 2004, he was appointed bishop of Añatuya. Uriona received his episcopal consecration on the following 8 May from Jorge Mario Bergoglio, archbishop of Buenos Aires, the later pope Francis, with bishop of Lomas de Zamora, Agustín Roberto Radrizzani, and bishop of Santa María del Patrocinio en Buenos Aires, Miguel Mykycej, serving as co-consecrators.
