= Coroico =

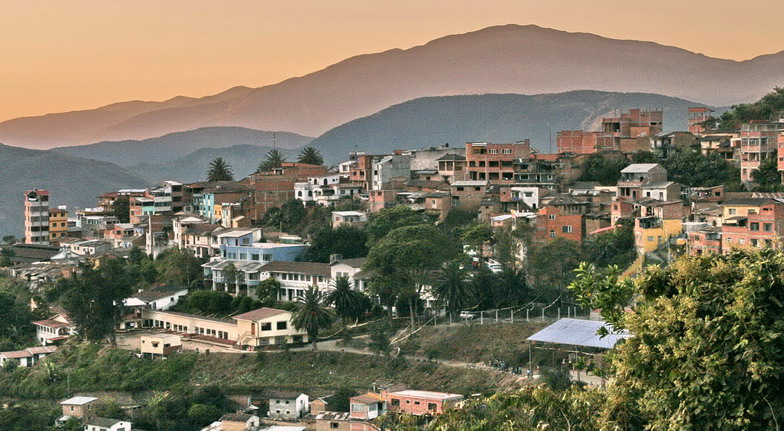

- Location in Bolivia
- Coordinates: 16°11′S 67°44′W
- Country: Bolivia
- Department: La Paz Department
- Province: Nor Yungas Province
- Elevation: 1,525 m (5,003 ft)

Population (2001 census)
  - City: 12,237
  - Urban: 2,197
  - Rural: 10,040
- Time zone: UTC-4 (BOT)

Coroico is a town in Nor Yungas Province, in the La Paz Department of western Bolivia.

== History ==
Coroico Viejo (Old Coroico) was founded above the river Quri Wayq'u (Quechua quri gold, wayq'u valley, hispanicized spellings Coriguayco, Kori Huayco). The town lived from mining gold, but the massive attacks by indigenous populations left the first Spanish colonial settlers in search of protection.

Looking for a defendable position in the early 18th century, the settlers arrived at the current location of Coroico only to be chased into a cave by a powerful lightning on Cerro Uchumachi. The cave still exists below the church on the main plaza of Coroico. In the late 18th and early 19th centuries, Coroico survived a couple of Indian attacks - the biggest one was at the time of the Bolivian War of Independence. 5000 Aymaras attacked the town, which in those days only had 500 inhabitants. The town stood strong, forcing the Aymaras into retreat.

Since then, Coroicans celebrate the Feast of the Virgin on October 20. Coroico became the capital of the North-Yungas in 1899 making Coroico the political and industrial center of the region, which produces wood products, fruits, and coca for the La Paz region of Bolivia. In 1958, the city was made the seat of the Territorial Prelature of Coroico, and elevated to the Roman Catholic Diocese of Coroico in 1983.

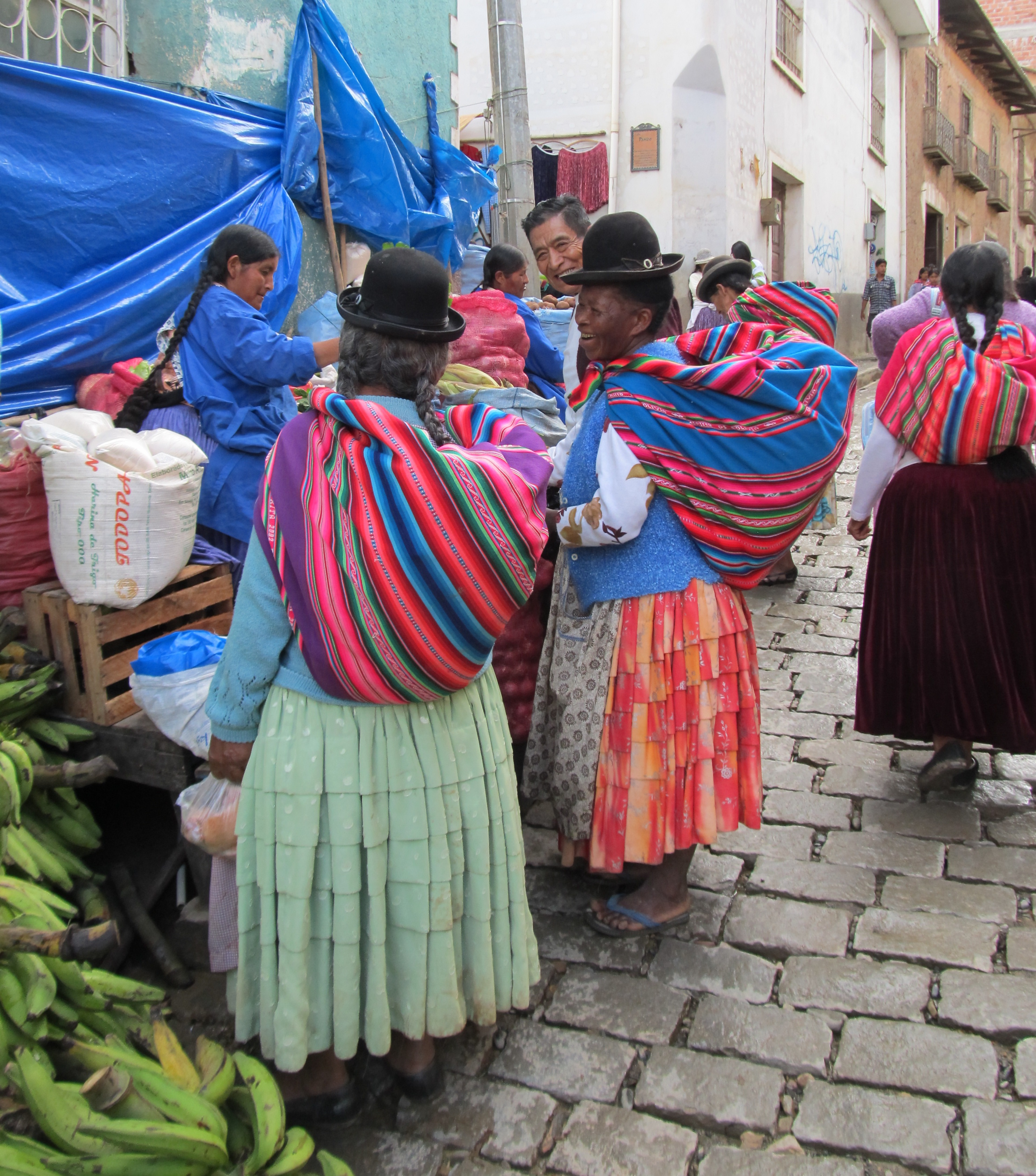
An Afro-Bolivian woman dressed in traditional Andean clothing in Coroico

From the mid-18th century, the lands in this region came under the control of a few powerful families, the hacienderos. These families maintained control of this region until the agrarian reforms that followed the 1952 revolution transferred land to local communities. Now, Coroico has a mostly Aymara and mestizo population. The town has become a major market for the surrounding region. Staple products arrive from La Paz and the surrounding areas to be sold in the colorful markets and stores all days of the week. The region around Coroico has remained a traditional coca growing area and is the smallest of three areas of coca production in Bolivia.

On a part of the road from La Paz to Coroico a new highway has been opened at the end of 2006, and the old Yungas Road is now used mainly for bikers. This Yungas Road is also called the "death road".

The municipality of Coroico also hosts the Unidad Académica Campesina-Carmen Pampa (UAC-Carmen Pampa), a satellite campus of the Catholic University of Bolivia. Founded in 1993, the UAC-Carmen Pampa offers B.S.-equivalent degree programs in agronomy, veterinary/animal science, nursing, education and ecotourism.
