= Coripata =

- Town
- Location within Bolivia
- Coordinates: 16°18′S 67°36′W
- Country: Bolivia
- Department: La Paz Department
- Province: Nor Yungas Province
- Municipality: Coripata Municipality

Government
  - Mayor: Félix Huanca Huanca (2007)
  - President: Luisa Jordán Ascarrumz (2007)

Population (2001)
  - Total: 2,205
- Time zone: UTC-4 (BOT)

Coripata is a town in the La Paz Department, Bolivia.

== Climate ==
Climate data for Coripata, elevation 1,788 m (5,866 ft)
Month	Jan	Feb	Mar	Apr	May	Jun	Jul	Aug	Sep	Oct	Nov	Dec	Year
Mean daily maximum °C (°F)	26.2 (79.2)	25.9 (78.6)	26.3 (79.3)	26.2 (79.2)	25.8 (78.4)	24.9 (76.8)	24.8 (76.6)	25.1 (77.2)	26.2 (79.2)	26.6 (79.9)	26.7 (80.1)	26.2 (79.2)	25.9 (78.6)
Daily mean °C (°F)	20.6 (69.1)	20.5 (68.9)	20.7 (69.3)	20.4 (68.7)	19.7 (67.5)	18.7 (65.7)	18.4 (65.1)	18.8 (65.8)	19.9 (67.8)	20.0 (68.0)	20.8 (69.4)	20.6 (69.1)	19.9 (67.9)
Mean daily minimum °C (°F)	15.1 (59.2)	15.1 (59.2)	15.1 (59.2)	14.7 (58.5)	13.7 (56.7)	12.5 (54.5)	12.1 (53.8)	12.6 (54.7)	13.6 (56.5)	14.4 (57.9)	15.0 (59.0)	15.0 (59.0)	14.1 (57.4)
Average precipitation mm (inches)	149.5 (5.89)	139.7 (5.50)	111.8 (4.40)	62.3 (2.45)	30.7 (1.21)	25.1 (0.99)	31.4 (1.24)	49.2 (1.94)	83.8 (3.30)	91.7 (3.61)	94.4 (3.72)	123.5 (4.86)	993.1 (39.11)
Average precipitation days	10.9	10.7	8.4	5.2	2.6	2.2	2.6	4.1	5.8	6.4	6.7	9.6	75.2
Average relative humidity (%)	81.3	82.6	82.8	80.5	79.1	76.9	76.1	75.7	77.8	78.8	79.4	79.9	79.2
Source: Servicio Nacional de Meteorología e Hidrología de Bolivia
