= Nor Yungas Province =

Nor Yungas
- Province
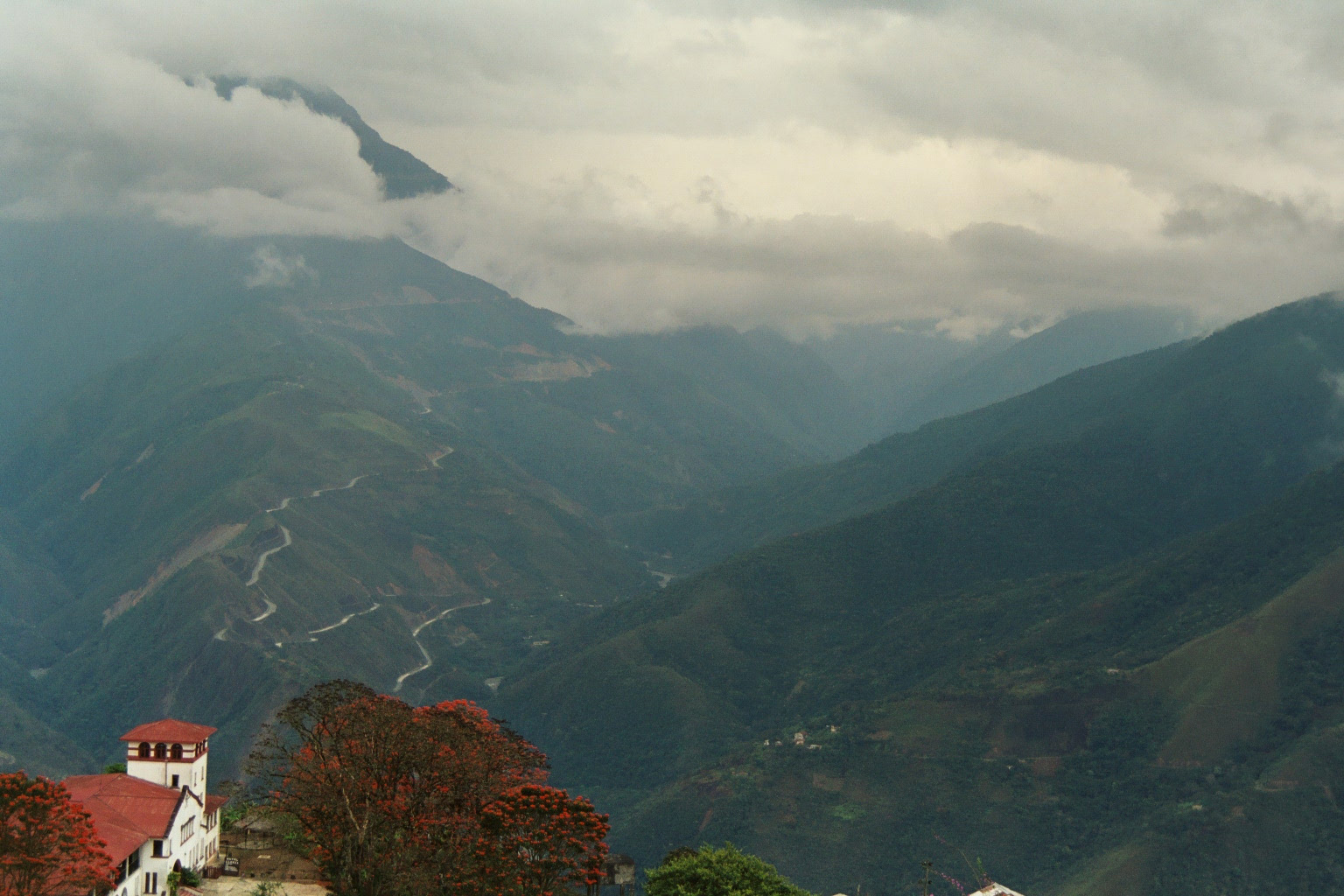
- Coroico

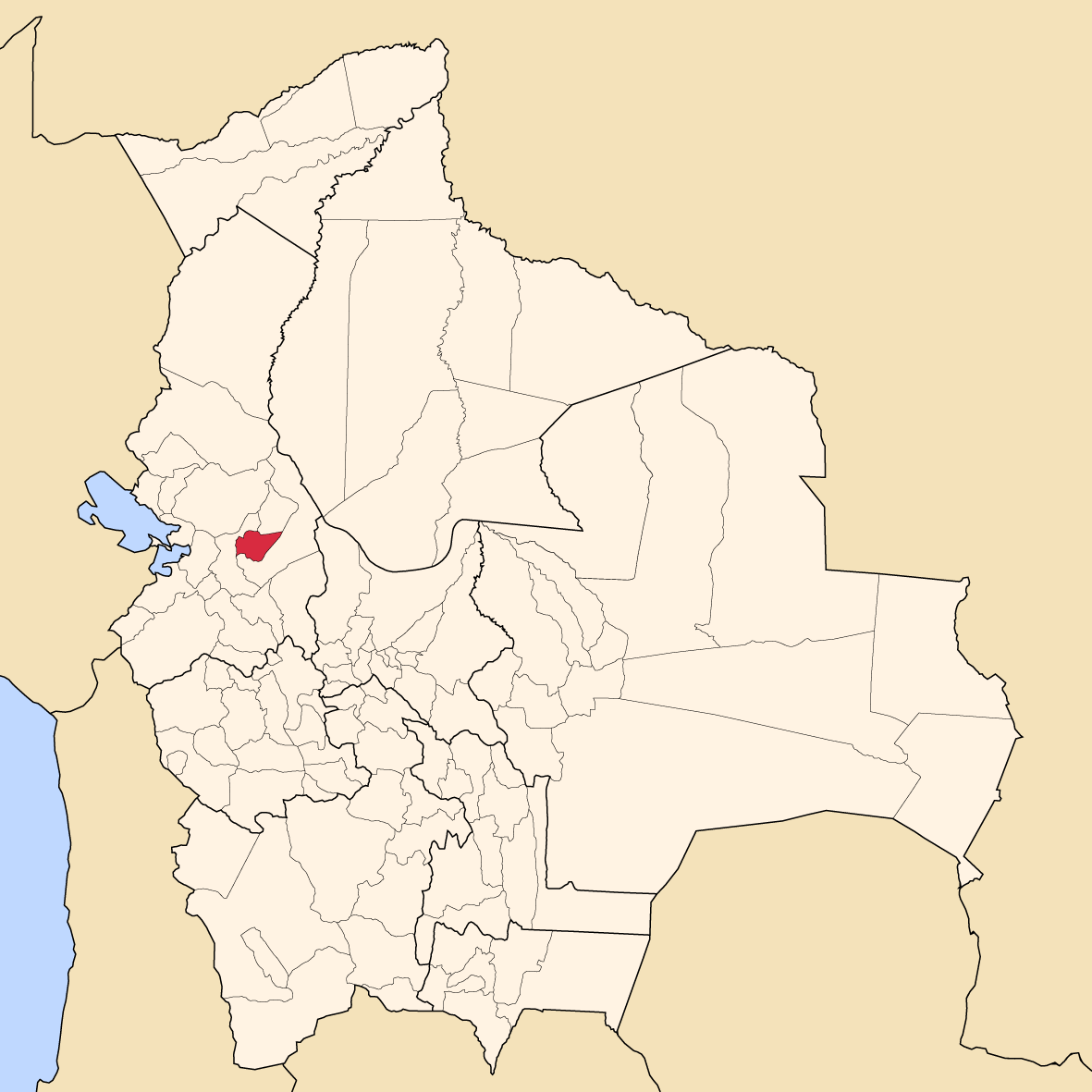
- Location of Nor Yungas Province within Bolivia

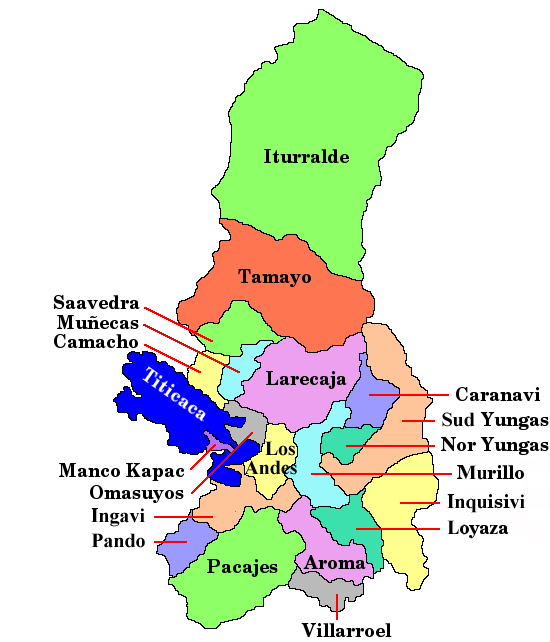
- Provinces of the La Paz Department
- Coordinates: 16°10′0″S 67°40′0″W
- Country: Bolivia
- Department: La Paz Department
- Municipalities: 2
- Founded: January 12, 1899
- Capital: Coroico

Area
  - Total: 1,720 km^{2} (660 sq mi)

Population (2024 census)
  - Total: 51,441
  - Density: 29.9/km^{2} (77.5/sq mi)
  - Ethnicities: Mainly Aymara and Afro-Bolivians
- Time zone: UTC-4 (BOT)
- Website: Official website

Nor Yungas is a province in the Yungas area of the Bolivian department of La Paz. During the presidency of José Manuel Pando the Yungas Province was divided into two parts, the Nor Yungas and the Sud Yungas Province, by law of January 12, 1899. Its administrative seat is the town of Coroico.

== Subdivision ==
The province is divided into two municipalities.

Municipality	Inhabitants (2001)	Seat	Inhabitants (2001)
Coroico Municipality	12,237	Coroico	2,197
Coripata Municipality	11,444	Coripata	2,205

== Places of interest ==
- Cotapata National Park and Integrated Management Natural Area

== See also ==
- Kimsa Warmini
- P'iqi Q'ara
- P'iqi Q'ara (in Coroico)
