= Bogucice =

District of Katowice

- Katowice District
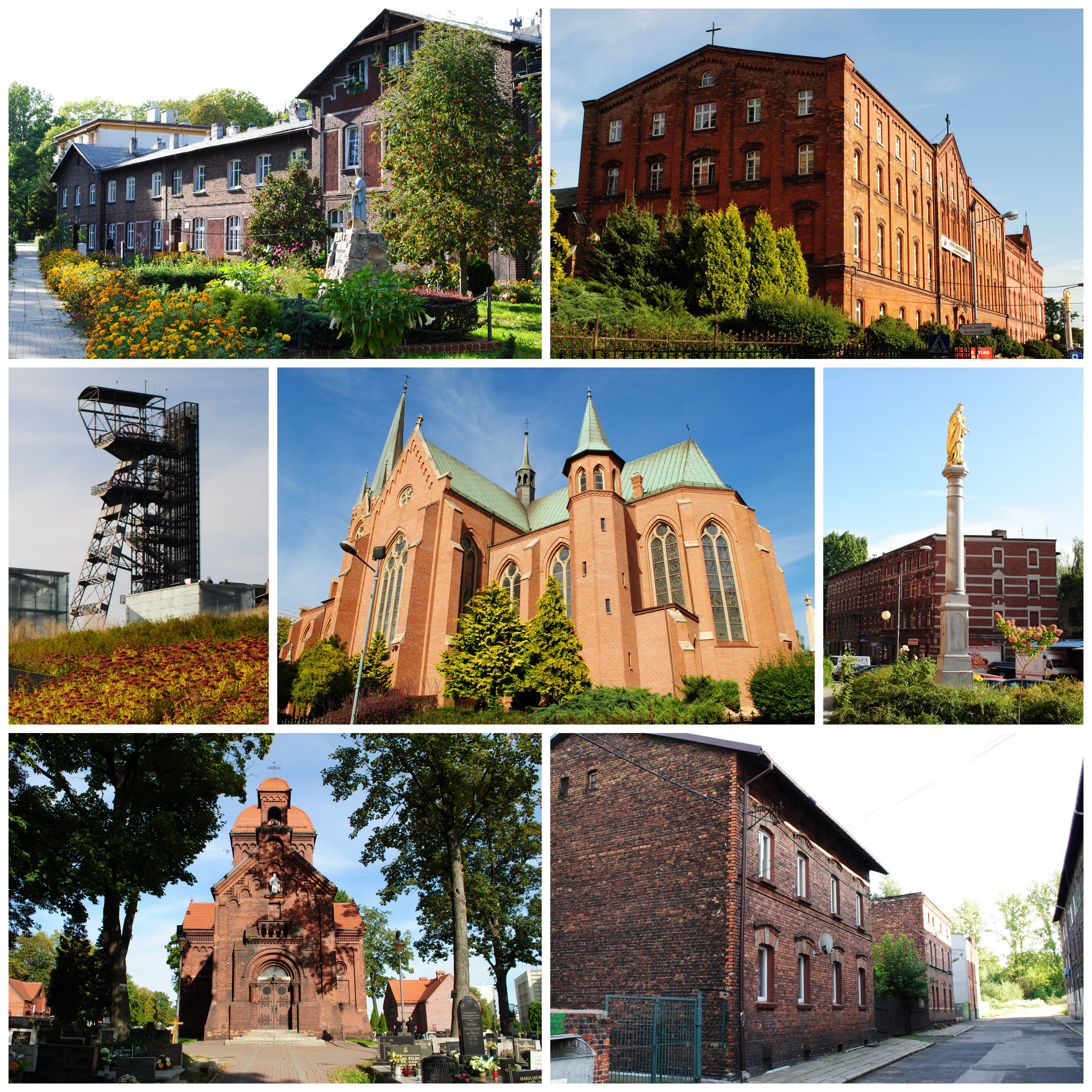
- Buildings on Kopalniana Street, the Hospital of the Brothers Hospitallers of St. John of God, the winding tower of the former Katowice Coal Mine on the grounds of the Silesian Museum, St. Stephen's Church, a section of Leopold Markiefka Street with a Marian figure, the Chapel of the Sacred Heart of Jesus at the cemetery on Walery Wróblewski Street, familoks on J. I. Kraszewski Street

- Coat of arms

- Location of Bogucice within Katowice
- Coordinates: 50°16′0.3″N 19°02′23″E
- Country: Poland
- Voivodeship: Silesian
- County/City: Katowice
- Established: 1 January 1992

Area
  - Total: 2.78 km^{2} (1.07 sq mi)

Population (2020)
  - Total: 16,538
  - Density: 5,950/km^{2} (15,400/sq mi)
- Time zone: UTC+1 (CET)
  - Summer (DST): UTC+2 (CEST)
- Area code: (+48) 032

Bogucice (German: Bogutschütz) is a part and district of Katowice, Poland, located in the northern part of the city in the Chorzów Hills area, bordering Dąbrówka Mała, Szopienice-Burowiec, Zawodzie, Śródmieście, Koszutka, Wełnowiec-Józefowiec, and the city of Siemianowice Śląskie. It is one of the smallest districts of Katowice and serves mainly residential and cultural functions. The Culture Zone, which is located there, is home to the Polish National Radio Symphony Orchestra and the Silesian Museum.

Bogucice was founded in the 13th century under German law, with the first mention of the settlement dating to 1360. In the Middle Ages, it was one of the largest villages in the area of present-day Katowice, and it was the site of founding of the Parish of St. Stephen, the oldest Roman Catholic parish in Katowice, established between 1374 and 1396. Historical parts of Bogucice later developed into the districts of Koszutka and Zawodzie, as well as Kuźnica Bogucka, which was the nucleus of Katowice. Bogucice retained its agricultural character until the 19th century, when the Franz and Fanny zinc smelters, along with the Ferdinand Coal Mine (later the Katowice Coal Mine), were established. Industry contributed to the development of the village and a rapid rise in its population. Bogucice was incorporated into Katowice on 15 October 1924. In 1999, the Katowice-Kleofas mine in the Katowice Mining District was closed, and at the beginning of the 21st century, its former grounds were transformed into the Culture Zone, which houses cultural institutions, various types of large-scale events, and new residential developments, including Pierwsza Dzielnica.

The main transport routes in Bogucice include Walenty Roździeński Avenue, while within the district, Leopold Markiefka Street and Katowicka Street are home to many commercial and service establishments, as well as historic buildings mostly from the turn of the 19th and 20th centuries. The Polish mountaineer Jerzy Kukuczka is also associated with Bogucice, where a housing estate was named after him. It has an area of 2.78 km^{2} and at the end of 2020, it had 16,538 inhabitants.

The most eminent piece of architecture in Bogucice is the Gothic Revival St. Stephen the Martyr's church, which was consecrated in 1894. The oldest cemetery in Katowice, first mentioned in 1598, was located in Bogucice, but there are no remains from this period today.

== Geography ==
=== Location ===
Bogucice is one of Katowice's 22 districts (auxiliary unit No. 13), belonging to the group of central districts. It covers 2.78 km², which accounts for 1.69% of the entire city's area. Bogucice is located in the northern part of Katowice, on the northern bank of the Rawa river, less than 3 km from the city center. The average travel time by car is 7–10 minutes, by city bus about 20 minutes, and by bicycle 10 minutes.

Bogucice borders Wełnowiec-Józefowiec and the city of Siemianowice Śląskie (with the Centrum district) to the north, Dąbrówka Mała to the east, Szopienice-Burowiec, Zawodzie, and Śródmieście to the south, and Koszutka to the west. The district's borders are:

- to the north – it runs parallel to the east of Cedrowa Street, then the border coincides with the boundary between Katowice and Siemianowice Śląskie, running irregularly in a south-easterly direction;
- to the east – parallel to the west of Wiertnicza Street and the J. Pawlik Roundabout, then continuing in a south-easterly direction along Wiertnicza, Techników, and Szwedzka streets to the junction with Walenty Roździeński Avenue;
- to the south – along the middle of W. Roździeński Avenue in a south-westerly direction, and at the intersection with Bogucicka Street, it continues westwards to the junction with Olimpijska Street;
- to the west – partly along Olimpijska and S. Skrzypek streets, then along Brzozowa Street and the eastern side of Osikowa Street.

According to Jerzy Kondracki's physio-geographical regionalization, Bogucice is located in the Katowice Upland mesoregion, which forms the southern part of the Silesian Upland macroregion. The Silesian Upland itself is a part of the Silesian-Kraków Upland subprovince. Historically, it forms part of eastern Upper Silesia.

=== Geology ===
Bogucice is located in the Upper Silesian Sinkhole in an area with horst structures. At the turn of the Devonian and Carboniferous periods, the Paleozoic bedrock of the Silesian Uplands was disturbed by the formation of a sinkhole, which during the Carboniferous was filled with conglomerates, sandstones, and shales containing bituminous coal deposits. These formations form the bedrock of the district, and the uppermost Carboniferous strata cover the majority of the district, lying to the west of F. Ścigała Street and to the north of Normy and Podhalańska streets. There are also outcrops of the Ruda layers (younger Carboniferous series – Westphalian A) belonging to the Łęka group. Their total thickness reaches 300 m. In the lower part, this layer is composed of sandstones with about six thin coal seams, while the upper part, composed mainly of shales, is much richer – it contains about 30 coal seams, 8 of which are more than 1 m thick. The area of Bogucice to the east of the estate of townhouses on Osikowa and Cedrowa streets in Koszutka is formed by saddle beds with a thickness of 73–76 m, containing up to 4 coal seams with a total thickness of 14–17 m.

The main features of Bogucice's terrain were formed during the Tertiary period, with intensive processes of chemical weathering and denudation occurring at that time. During the Quaternary, the area was likely covered by the Scandinavian ice sheet twice: during the oldest Mindel glaciation and during the Riss glaciation. The sediments from the first glaciation were mostly removed during the interglacial, while the Riss glaciation ice sheet left behind tills along valley depressions. Part of the Culture Zone in Bogucice is made up of undifferentiated fluvioglacial sands and gravels, while the remaining area of the old part of the district and Osiedle Kukuczki is built on sandy and silty eluvium of till on layered sands. The area of Bogucice stretching along the border with Dąbrówka Mała is made up of sandy and silty eluvium of till.

In the current Holocene, processes of erosion and removal of Pleistocene sediment covers are occurring. A larger area of Holocene fluvial sediments in Bogucice is located southeast of the intersection of Walery Wróblewski Street and Ryszarda Street.

=== Topography ===
Koszutka is located in the Silesian Upland, on the Bytom-Katowice Plateau, which is part of the Katowice Upland mesoregion. The terrain of the district is varied. The southern edge of the district along Walenty Roździeński Avenue consists of river valley floors with Pleistocene terraces, while the northern areas are hilly uplands formed on Carboniferous rocks and flat clay plateaus.

The present-day relief of Bogucice was shaped mainly by the Mindel glaciation and the maximum stage of the Riss glaciation, while in recent times, human activity related to settlement and mining has also had a significant impact. This has led to the destruction of the natural substrate and the creation of new forms of landscape degradation. A significant area of the district also constitutes an anthropogenic surface of levelling. Coal mining in the "Bogucice" mining area between 1824 and 1999 contributed to land subsidence reaching 11–13 m in the north-eastern part of the area, 15 m in the area of W. Roździeński Avenue, and 9.0 m north of Bagienna Street.

In terms of morphological units, Bogucice is located on the Chorzów Hills. These form the southern part of the Bytom-Katowice Plateau and form a series of undulating, rounded or flattened hills exceeding 300 m above sea level in several places – the so-called Bogucice fields. Towards the Rawa river valley, the slopes are cut by valley depressions, including one running along Leopold Markiefka Street. The highest point of the district is on the border between Bogucice and Koszutka, at Cedrowa Street, reaching 310 m above sea level. The intersection of Leopolda Street and Walery Wróblewski Street is located at an altitude of 279.7 m above sea level, the intersection of Morawska and Wrocławska streets is at an altitude of 276.0 m above sea level, and the northern part of Bogucice Park is at an altitude of approximately 267 m above sea level. The lowest point in Bogucice stretches along W. Roździeński Avenue on the border between Bogucice and Zawodzie, where the altitude drops below 260 m above sea level. The difference in elevation between the extreme points of the district is about 50 meters.

=== Soils ===
The soils in Bogucice have mostly developed on a substrate of wetland sands. Human activity has led to changes in soil properties, and long-term urban development has resulted in the formation of anthrosols in the district. Some of the land is affected by mining and contaminated with heavy metals. Anthrosols formed from tills dominate throughout the district. Human activity is the main soil-forming factor in these soils.

The soils in the district are among the highest classified in Katowice – there are small enclaves of class III soils that are not used for agricultural purposes near Ludwika Street. Individual areas on the border between Bogucice and Dąbrówka Mała, as well as the area at the intersection of Ryszarda and W. Wróblewski streets, are classified as Class IV.

=== Surface and groundwater ===
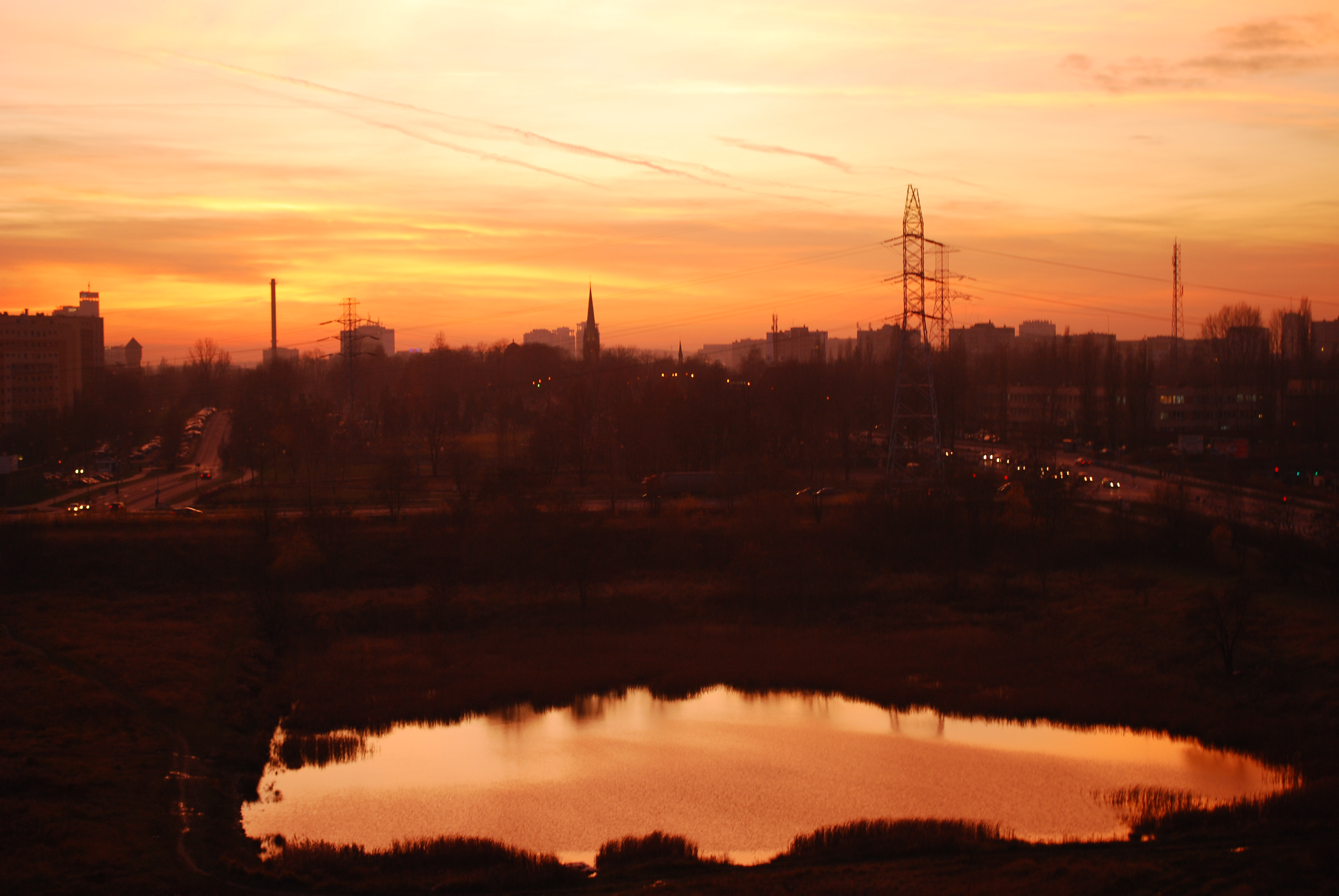
View from Osiedle Norma towards Bogucice; in the foreground, the pond near Leopolda Street

Bogucice is located entirely within the Vistula drainage basin, in the basin of the Rawa river. The Rawa itself does not flow through the district.

In the past, the Bogucice Stream flowed through the district. It originated in a small forest between Bogucice and Wełnowiec. According to a map from the 1820s, the stream flowed from the north, behind the farms located in the area of present-day F. Ścigała Street, and was dammed by folds in the terrain and crossroads into six ponds. From the southernmost pond between the former farmstead and L. Markiefka Street, the stream turned southwest and flowed into the Rawa River at the HELIOS plant in Zawodzie. At this point, a backwater of the Rawa was formed, from which the river flowed in two channels. On maps from the 1840s, the Bogucice Stream disappeared along with its ponds, the pond in the lower course, near the farm, remained.

Within the boundaries of Bogucice, in the eastern part of the district, there are currently two ponds, one of which is the 2-hectare Młodzieżowy Pond, located in the area of Leopolda Street. It is managed by Group No. 23 Katowice-Bogucice of the Polish Angling Association.

In Bronisław Paczyński's classification, Bogucice is located within the Silesian-Kraków hydrogeological region, in the Upper Silesian subregion. Aquifers occur in all layers, but their importance depends on several factors. According to the division of Poland into Uniform Groundwater Areas, the entire district is located in Uniform Groundwater Area No. 111 (Central Vistula Uplands Subregion). Coal mining in the "Bogucice" mining area has contributed to the drainage of Quaternary water levels, and the natural flow of groundwater has also been disrupted.

=== Climate and topoclimate ===
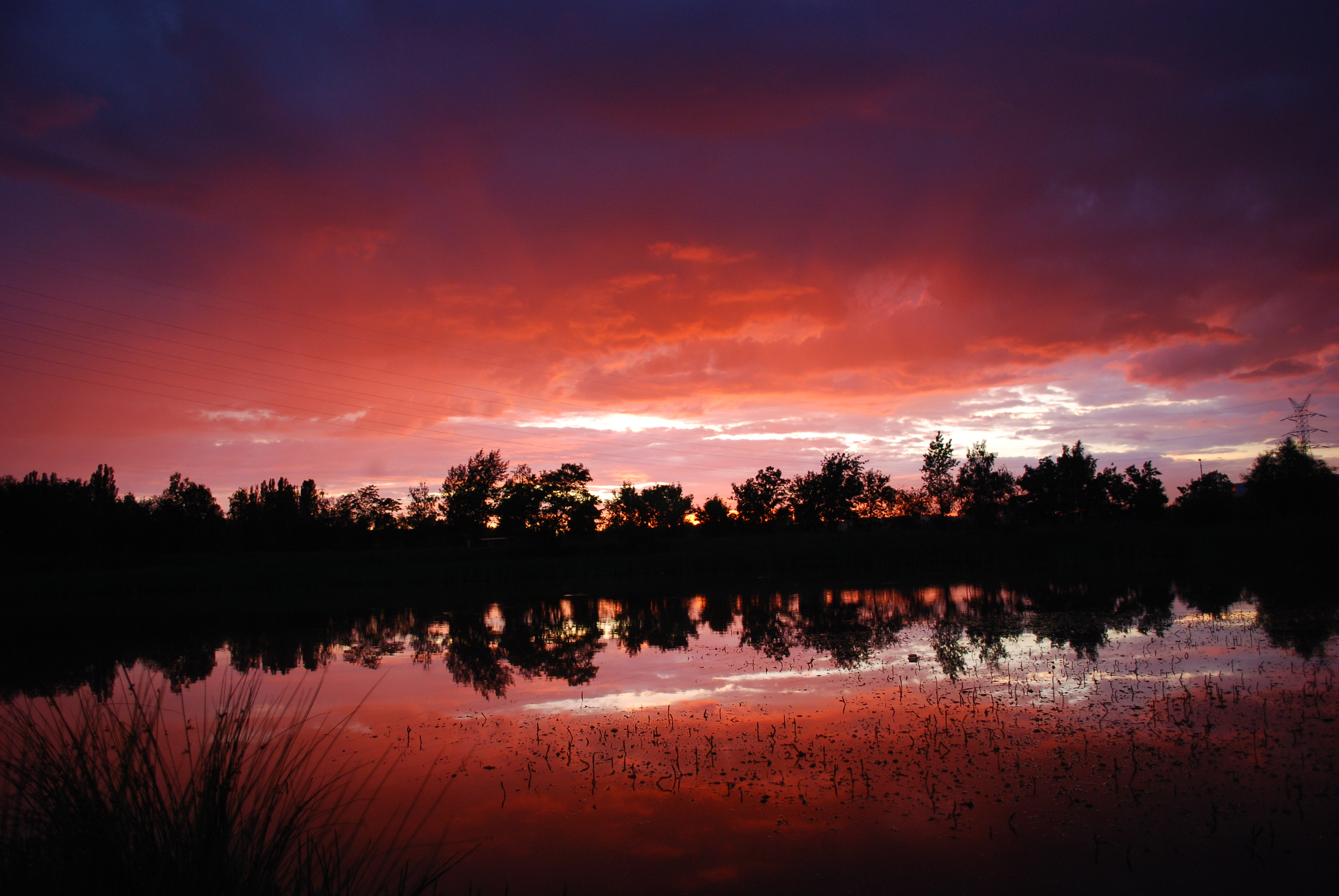
Sunrise on 9 June 2009 over the pond near Leopolda Street

The climatic conditions in Bogucice are similar to those in Katowice as a whole, and are modified by both climatic and local factors. The climate of the district is influenced more by oceanic than continental factors, and is occasionally modified by tropical air masses arriving from the southwest through the Moravian Gate.

The average annual temperature in the multi-year period 1961–2005, measured at the nearby station in Muchowiec, was 8.1 °C. The warmest month in the period studied was July (17.8 °C), and the coldest was January (−2.2 °C). The average annual sunshine duration in the period 1966–2005 was 1,474 hours, while the average cloud cover in the same period was 5.3. The average annual precipitation in the period 1951–2005 was 713.8 mm. The average duration of snow cover is 60–70 days, and the growing season usually lasts from 200 to 220 days. Throughout the year, westerly and southwesterly winds prevail (20.7% and 20.4% of all winds, respectively), while winds from the north are the least frequent (5.7%). The average wind speed is 2.4 m/s.

The climate of the district is modified by local factors, depending on the land cover and the location in relation to river valleys – in the case of Bogucice, in relation to the Rawa river. In densely built-up areas, the local climate is influenced by the warming of the atmosphere as a result of human activity. Dense areas of buildings, roads, and squares cause an increase in air temperature in the ground layer of the atmosphere. These areas also lose heat faster due to radiation at night, and the lack of moisture in the air is not conducive to prolonged heat retention.

=== Nature and environmental protection ===
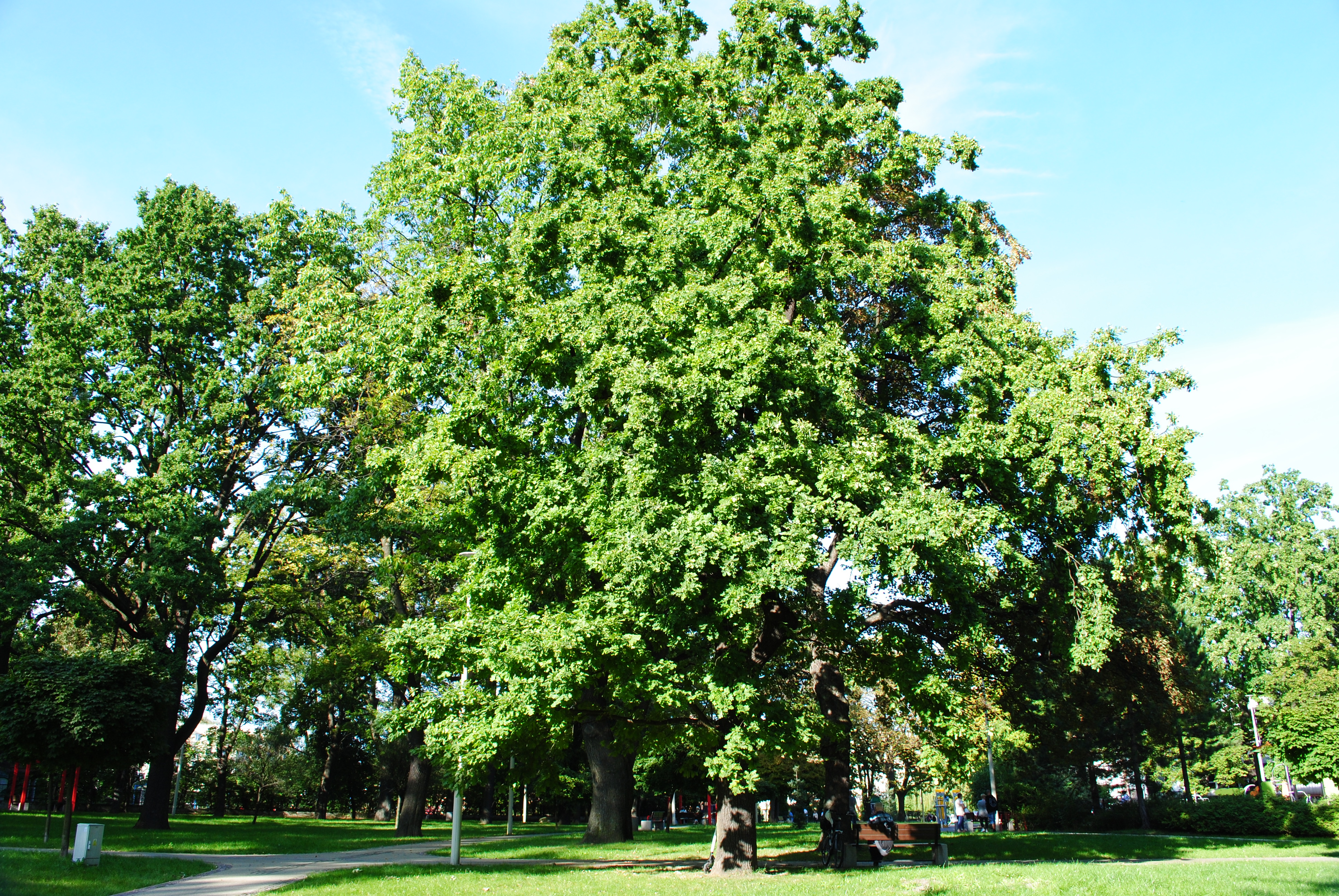
Part of Bogucice Park

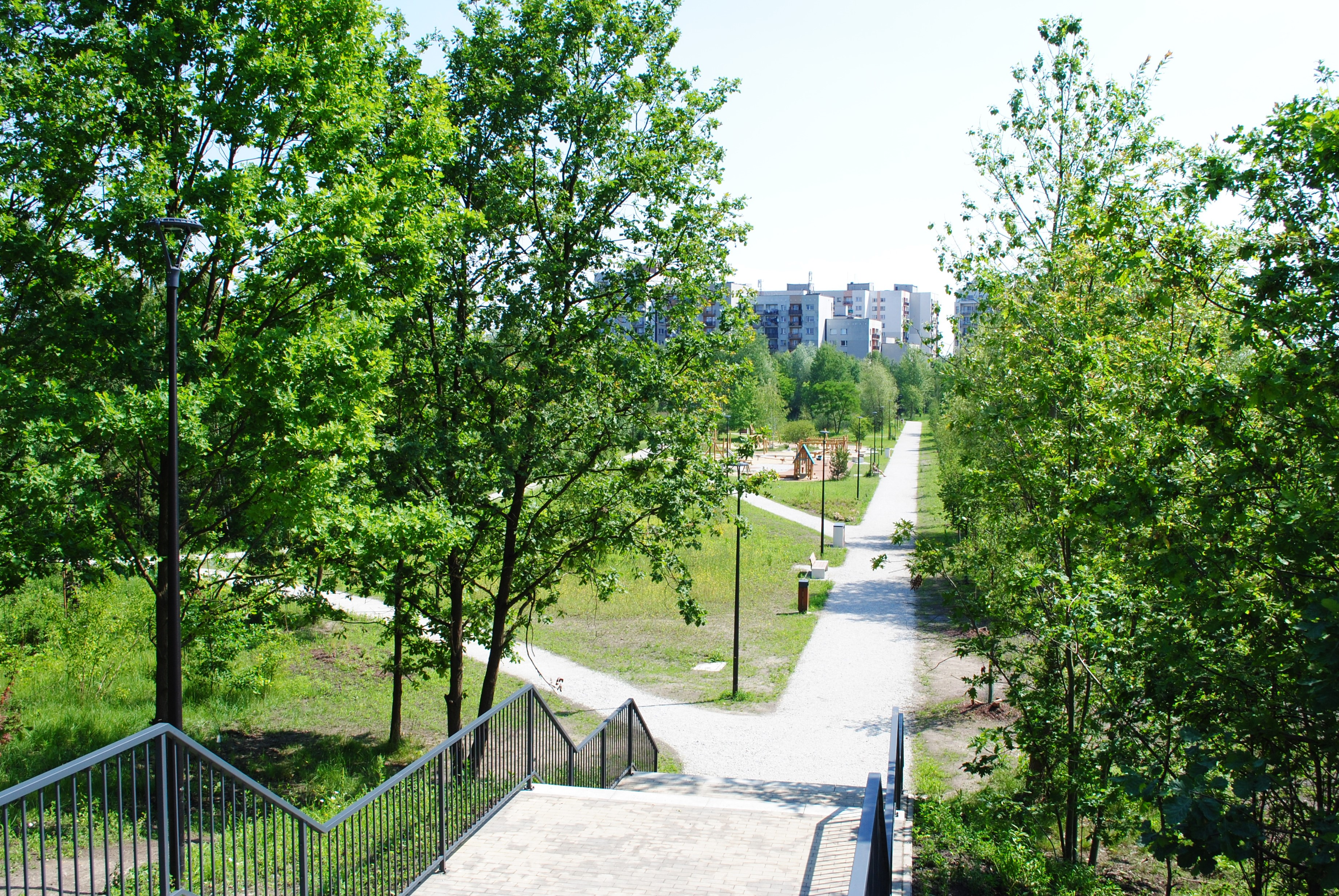
Part of the park on Leopolda Street

The natural vegetation in Bogucice has been shaped since the last glaciation 12,000–16,000 years ago, and over the last 200 years it has been subjected to strong anthropogenic pressure. Originally, the district was covered with oak-hornbeam and beech forests, but the development of dense housing has led to the almost complete disappearance of natural elements. Ruderal species have developed in urbanized habitats, thriving mainly in anthropogenic habitats of built-up areas and urban wasteland. Conditions were also created for the development of synanthropic animals, the most important of which are birds, including those that have long accompanied humans, such as the house sparrow and pigeon, as well as native birds that have adapted to urban conditions, including swifts, house martins, and barn swallows.

Today, the natural structure of Bogucice is dominated by greenery in the form of street plantings, courtyards, squares, and parks. These areas create green spaces of various sizes. The largest area of greenery in the district is Bogucice Park, covering 3.78 ha and located in the area of Kopalniana, F. Ścigała, and Nadgórników streets. It is administered by the Katowice Municipal Greenery Department. It is equipped with alleys, lighting, and elements of street furniture (including benches, trash cans, and bicycle racks). In place of the theatre shell that was demolished as part of the park's modernization, there is an imitation of a river in the form of pebbles, and a little closer to F. Ścigała Street, there is a square with seating for an audience. Other amenities of the park include a playground, a dog run, and an outdoor gym. Bogucice Park underwent a comprehensive renovation between August 2018 and July 2019.

In April 2024, work was completed on the creation of a park in the previously neglected area at the intersection of Bohaterów Monte Cassino, Leopolda, and Wiertnicza streets. It includes street furniture, a playground, a green maze, barbecue areas, and bird watching spots. In the southern part of the park, there is an espalier of small-leaved linden trees, forming a natural southern boundary of the area, nest boxes, insect hotels, and hedgehog houses.

A significant part of Bogucice – about 16% of its area – is occupied by allotment gardens: "Słoneczne Wzgórze", "Przy Alpach", "Dolina Zgody", and "Radość", located near the border with Siemianowice Śląskie.

Two natural monuments are located in Bogucice:

- A pedunculate oak (Quercus robur) with a height of 25 m, a breast height diameter of 283 cm, and a circumference of 889 cm. It has been under protection since 1 June 2017 and is located in Bogucice Park.
- A sycamore maple (Acer pseudoplatanus) with a height of 30 m, a breast height diameter of 294 cm and a circumference of 924 cm. It has been under protection since 1 June 2017 and is located in Bogucice Park.

== Name ==
The name "Bogucice" most likely comes from one of the first settlers in the area of the present-day district, named Bogut or Boguta. Originally, the name referred to Bogut's descendants, but later it began to be used to refer to the entire settlement where they lived.

According to Robert Borowy, the form "Bohuticze", often used in early documents, indicates that the settlement was established when the first settlers arrived there from Moravia, and only later did the name probably become Polonized to "Boguczyce", "Bogudzice", and "Bogucice" – meaning the settlement of the descendants of the original founder of the village, Bohut.

The geographical and topographical index of localities in Prussia from 1835, authored by J.E. Muller, records the Polish name of the village as "Boguczyce" alongside its Germanized form "Bogutschütz". The Geographical Dictionary of the Kingdom of Poland, published in 1880, also lists Bogucice under the names "Boguczyce" and "Bohucicze".

== History ==
=== Until the 19th century ===
Bogucice was most likely founded in the 13th century or at the turn of the 13th and 14th centuries as a village under German law (according to a note found by a teacher of Czech origin from Bogucice, the settlement was to be founded in 1286). It was a new village, built from scratch on previously uninhabited land. The first written mention of the present-day district dates from 15 December 1360, included in a document of the Duke of Opole and Racibórz, Nicholas II, who bestowed the town and some other villages on Otto of Pilcza, Voivode of Sandomierz of the Topór coat of arms. At that time, Bogucice was a well-established village, inhabited by people engaged in agriculture and animal husbandry, located in the land of Mysłowice. In the Middle Ages, Bogucice was the largest village in the area and likely also one of the oldest. Originally, it bordered Załęże from the west to the Kłodnica river, then the historical border ran up the stream to the southeast to the intersection of trails east of Ochojec and towards the present-day Barbara-Janina ponds in Giszowiec. From there, it headed towards the area of today's Central Municipal Cemetery, then east along the northern edge of the Mysłowice Forest, and near Bagno, it reached the Rawa river.

Bogucice was already a parish village in the Middle Ages. It became a seat of a Catholic parish in Diocese of Kraków between 1374 and 1396, with the earliest mentions of its existence dating to 1414 and 1529. From the 15th century, Bogucice became a place of worship of Our Lady of Bogucice. At the time, iron forges operated there along the Roździanka (Rawa) river, one of which was known as the Bogucice forge. The first mention of it dates back to 1397, and it was one of the first industrial plants of this type in Upper Silesia. The forge functioned as a separate settlement at least until the end of the 15th century, and from the 16th century it was associated with the village of Katowice.

There were also two mills operating in Bogucice. The older one, known as the Alder Mill, dated back to the end of the 14th century and was located in present-day Zawodzie, while the newer one was from the mid-17th century and was situated in the area of today's Osiedle Walentego Roździeńskiego, also in Zawodzie. Both mills operated until the mid-19th century. In the Middle Ages, taverns also appeared in what is now Katowice, and innkeepers, like millers, enjoyed high social status. The inn in Bogucice is mentioned at the beginning of the 16th century; it then belonged to the local parish priest. A landowner wanted to take it over by force, but the inn remained the property of the priest even in the 17th century.

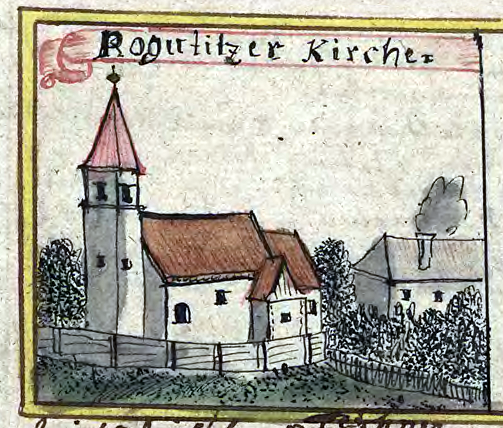
Bogucice church as depicted in an 18th-century engraving

In 1414, Bogucice was owned by Adam and Jam Mysłowski – heirs of Mysłowice, sons of Dzierżysław, and relatives (heirs) of Archbishop Bodzanta. The owners of the village changed along with the owners of the Pszczyna land and the Mysłowice estates. During the political upheaval caused by Matthias Corvinus, the land around Pszczyna was overtaken by Casimir II, Duke of Cieszyn, who acquired the Mysłowice land from the dukes of Opole in 1480, retaining it until 1517, when he sold it to the Hungarian magnates of the Thurzó family, forming the Pless state country. In the accompanying sales document issued in Czech in Fryštát on 21 February 1517, the village was mentioned as Bohuticze; the document also mentions "kuznicze druha v Bohuticz" (Kuźnica Bogucka). Subsequent owners of Bogucice included Aleksy Thurzon, Stanisław Salomon – the creator of the Mysłowice entail – the Mieroszewski family, and from 1839, Franz von Winckler.

A school was established in Bogucice in the 15th century, making it the first institution of its kind in present-day Katowice. It was first mentioned in 1619.

The Thirty Years' War had a significant impact on Bogucice, especially between 1621 and 1646, when the well-developed economy of the Pszczyna region, and in particular the Mysłowice estates, suffered a serious crisis as a result of looting and war contributions. The villages in the Katowice area suffered to varying degrees, including Bogucice. Between 1644 and 1645, raids by Polish nobles from Klimontów and Zagórze, organized by Przecław and Prosper Gocławski, were carried out against the estates of Krzysztof Mieroszewski. Paweł Kubik, Stanek, and Witek Młynarz were among the victims of the robberies, and a number of valuable items were stolen. As subjects of the Polish king, the invaders were sentenced to infamy, confiscation of property, and banishment.

The dynamic growth of Bogucice is recorded since the 17th century. New buildings were erected along the Bogucice Stream, which flowed southward into the Roździanka (Rawa) river. Before 1739, empty farms in Bogucice were settled, which was influenced by the active efforts of the then owner of the village, Jan Krzysztof Mieroszewski. Sources from the 17th and 18th centuries indicate that the settlement was inhabited by Polish people at that time. In the 18th century, Bogucice was the most developed village among all the settlements in the area of present-day Katowice. At that time, the buildings stretched along the road and along the stream, as well as between them. Until the end of the 18th century, agriculture was the main source of livelihood for the population of Bogucice, among others. Crops that did not require good soil, such as rye, oats, and barley, were grown there. Bogucice remained an agricultural settlement until the mid-19th century.

=== 19th century and early 20th century ===
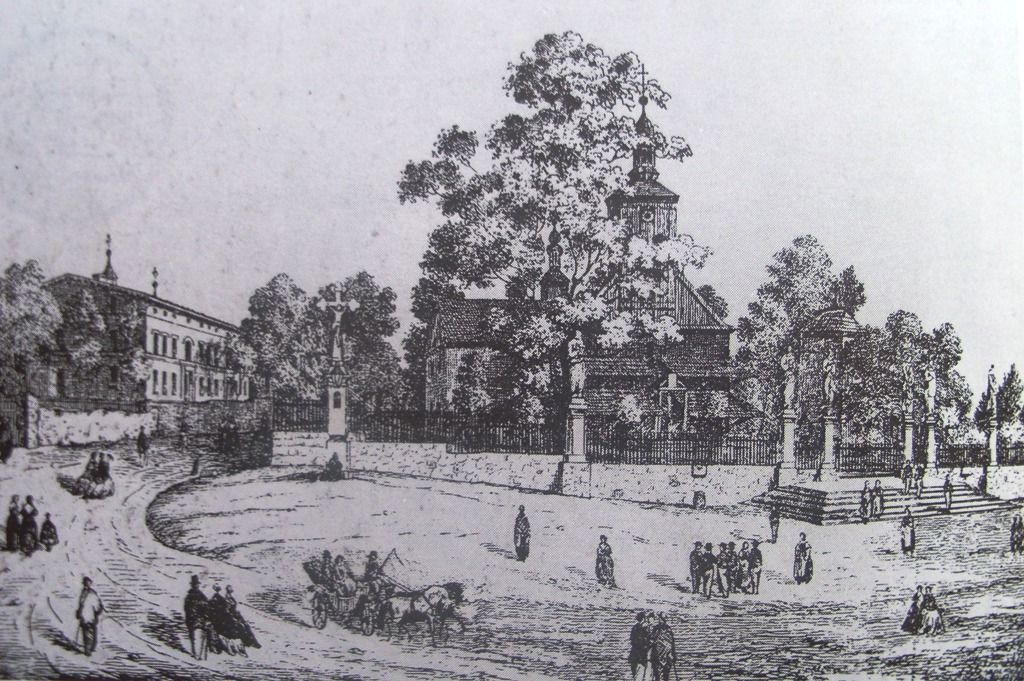
A mid-19th-century lithograph depicting the then wooden St. Stephen's Church

Bogucice began to lose its rural character in the mid-19th century. In 1804, a Catholic school was established there. In 1822, work began on the construction of the Ferdinand Coal Mine (later known as the Katowice Coal Mine). As the Ferdinand mine developed, so too did Bogucice. The areas of present-day Kopalniana Street, Leopold Markiefka Street, and Katowicka Street were transformed into an industrial settlement, and in 1867, Bogucice had a total of 3,764 inhabitants, with 114 houses, a farm, and a water mill. The Bogucice farmstead was located on parish land in the south of the village, which was gradually seized by landowners. It was liquidated in 1901.

The number of people employed in agriculture also declined rapidly. At the end of the 18th century, approximately 95% of the inhabitants of present-day Katowice were engaged in agriculture, and in 1845, the percentage of farmers in Bogucice was 49%. At the turn of the 19th and 20th centuries, heavy industry and mining workers in Bogucice accounted for about 40–50% of the population.

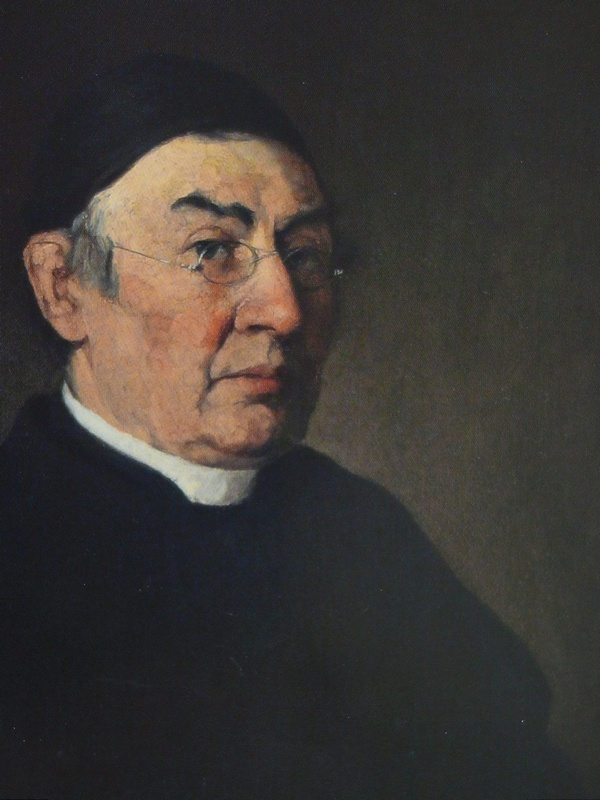
Father Leopold Markiefka – initiator and founder of several institutions in Bogucice

In 1858, Father Ludwik Markiefka founded an orphanage, which was later continued as the Convent of the Sisters of St. Hedwig. The wishes of Father Ludwik, who died in 1859, were fulfilled by his brother, Father Leopold Markiefka, who used his own funds to establish the hospital and convent of the Brothers Hospitallers of St. John of God in 1871. It was put into use in 1874. Between 1876 and 1877, an epidemic of typhus swept through Silesia, claiming among its victims the prior of the order and several brothers, two of whom died. In 1881, a Gothic Revival statue of the Virgin Mary with Child was placed on a column in front of the Brothers Hospitallers' hospital.

On 17 July 1892, the cornerstone for the construction of a new Gothic Revival church, designed by Paul Jackisch, was consecrated. St. Stephen's Church was consecrated by the Bishop of Wrocław, Cardinal Georg von Kopp, on 24 October 1894 or the following day. The construction of the building was initiated by Father Leopold Markiefka and continued by Father Ludwik Skowronek.

In 1891, a road connecting Bogucice directly with Zawodzie was built, and later, the present-day Leopold Markiefka Street was paved and provided with a sidewalk. In 1912, the town hall of Gmina Bogucice was constructed in Zawodzie.

At the end of the 19th century, the first cultural organizations began to emerge in Bogucice. In 1894, the Lutnia Choir was founded, and in 1909 (or 12 September 1902) the mixed Lira Choir was established. Two years later, a Bogucice branch of the Sokół Polish Gymnastic Society was formed, resuming its activities in 1917 with 180 members. Bogucice branch of Sokół was led by Antoni Wysocki, Henryk Miękina, and Wiktor Kuś. In December 1918, members of Polish associations founded the Veterans' Union. In January 1919, a branch of the Polish Military Organization of Upper Silesia was established there. its organizers included Tomasz Kotlarz, Augustyn Rzepka, Franciszek Wiechuła, and Konrad Wróbel. The Polish Military Organization district headquarters in Bogucice was located in a tenement at 6 Normy Street, and its organizer and commander of one of the companies was Wincenty Motyka. In the early 1920s, the Polish Women's Society, headed by Zofia Koniarkowa, was also active.

=== Interwar period and World War II ===
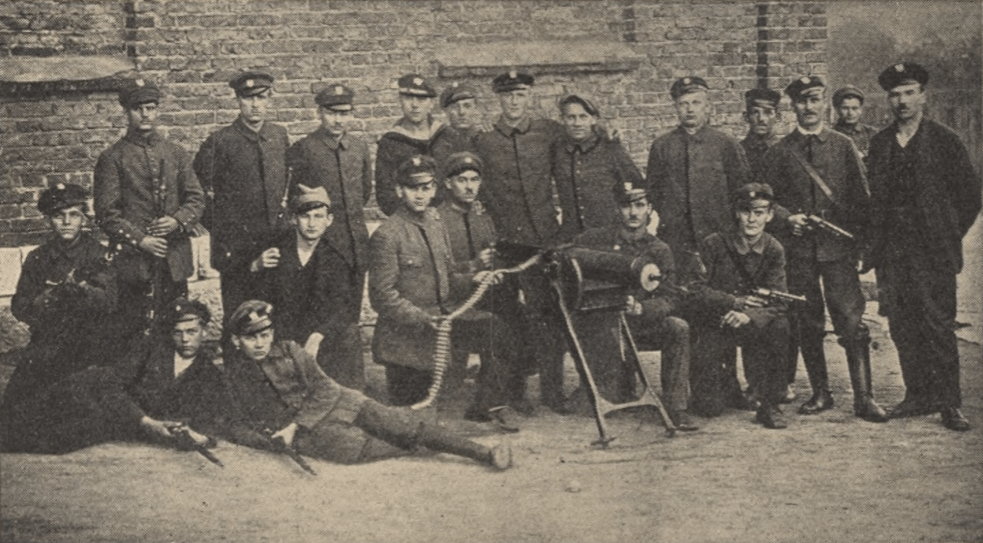
Unit of Silesian insurgents in Bogucice during the First Silesian Uprising (1919)

During the First Silesian Uprising on 18 August 1919, a unit under Tomasz Kotlarz captured Bogucice. On the same day, the settlement was defended against the Germans for three hours, after which the insurgents withdrew to Dąbrówka Mała. In the following days, the insurgents launched counterattacks, which proved ineffective. During the Second Silesian Uprising, Bogucice was captured by insurgent forces on 19 August 1920, and the area of patrols and armed operations of the Bogucice insurgents reached the borders of Mikołów. During the plebiscite held on 20 March 1921, out of 12,389 eligible residents of Gmina Bogucice, 6,783 voted in favour of Upper Silesia joining Poland, while 5,189 voted for the region to belong to Germany. At the beginning of the Third Silesian Uprising on 3 May 1921, Bogucice was taken without a fight by insurgents under the command of Rudolf Niemczyk, enabling the Polish forces to disarm the German plebiscite police garrison. On 2 June 1921, 29 insurgents from Bogucice were killed in Lichynia near Annaberg. The formal takeover of the district by the Polish administration took place on 20 June 1922.

Later that same month, in order to commemorate the fallen insurgents, national activists from Bogucice erected the first monument dedicated to the Silesian insurgents in the vicinity of the cemetery, at the intersection of Leopolda Street and Walery Wróblewski Street. The land for the pedestal was donated by the Bogucice parish, and a plaque with the names of 34 citizens who died in the Silesian uprisings was placed on it. The monument was blown up by German saboteurs on the night of 2–3 January 1930 – the act was carried out by a man named Dysza, who received money for this purpose from German intelligence.

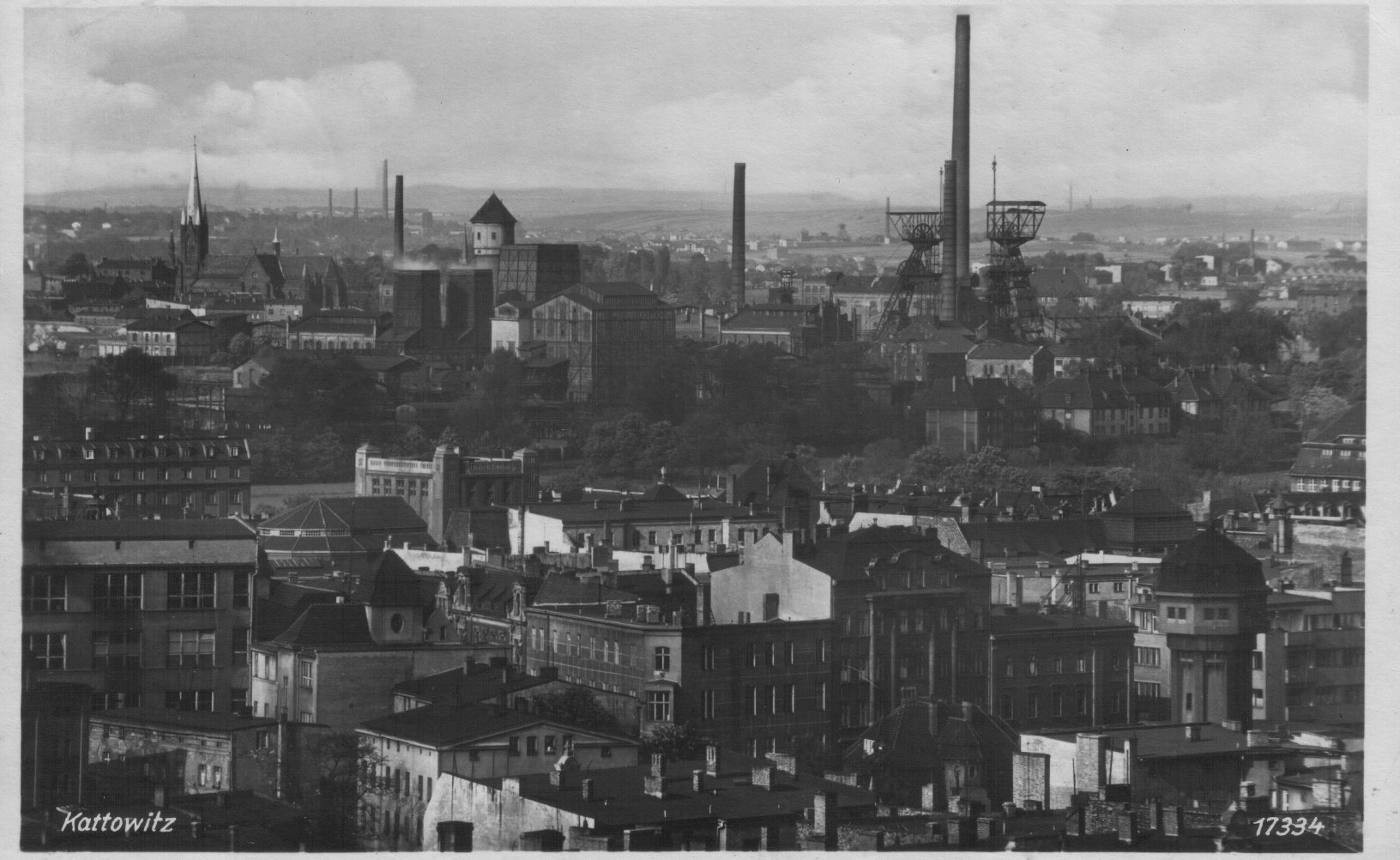
Wartime photograph showing a section of central Katowice (foreground) and Bogucice (background), with St. Stephen's Church and the later Katowice Coal Mine

On 15 October 1924, Gmina Bogucice was incorporated into Katowice. At the time, it had approximately 23,000 inhabitants.

In the interwar period, various parties and associations operated in Bogucice, using the People's House – later the Cultural Center of the Katowice Coal Mine – as their headquarters since 1921. Among others, the Society of Young Polish Women, the Union of Silesian Insurgents, and the J. Ligoń Choir operated in the present-day district. By 1939, about 87 social associations had been established there. Bogucice also remained a pilgrimage center. The pilgrimage movement reached its peak in 1929, when about 90,000 pilgrims visited it.

In the 1930s, a new workers' housing estate was built on the border between today's Bogucice and Koszutka. On 18 September 1932, a new monument commemorating the fallen Silesian insurgents from the Bogucice area was unveiled at the present-day Wincenty Wajda Square, designed by Jan Raszka. On 15 September 1936, the Bogucice mine was renamed from "Ferdinand" to "Katowice".

At the beginning of World War II, military operations in September 1939 focused on the defense of the Katowice Coal Mine. Fighting also took place in the area of the mine's brickyard and timber yards. In September 1939, the Germans destroyed the monument to the Silesian insurgents at W. Wajda Square. At the beginning of the German occupation of Poland, on 25 October 1939, the mine was taken over (it had been under military administration since 3 September 1939) by Reichswerke Hermann Göring, and its name was reverted to "Ferdinand".

The Polish Freedom Union (Home Army) operated in Bogucice, commanded by Wincenty Wajda, a foreman at the Katowice Coal Mine (Katowice city district), and Paweł Chromik (the Katowice county district). Both men were arrested in March 1944 and imprisoned in Katowice, where they died in the autumn of the same year. On 2 September 1940, Father Franciszek Ścigała – parish priest of Bogucice from 1923 to 1940 – died in the Mauthausen concentration camp. He was a well-known social and educational activist and a contributor to Gość Niedzielny. During the occupation, prisoners of war from the camp in Łambinowice and civilians, who were quartered in barracks next to the mine, worked in the Ferdinand (Katowice) mine. Bogucice was liberated from German occupation on 27 January 1945. At the end of January 1945, the mine workers saved their plant from destruction, and the first train with coal left the mine on 30 January of the same year.

=== Post-war period ===
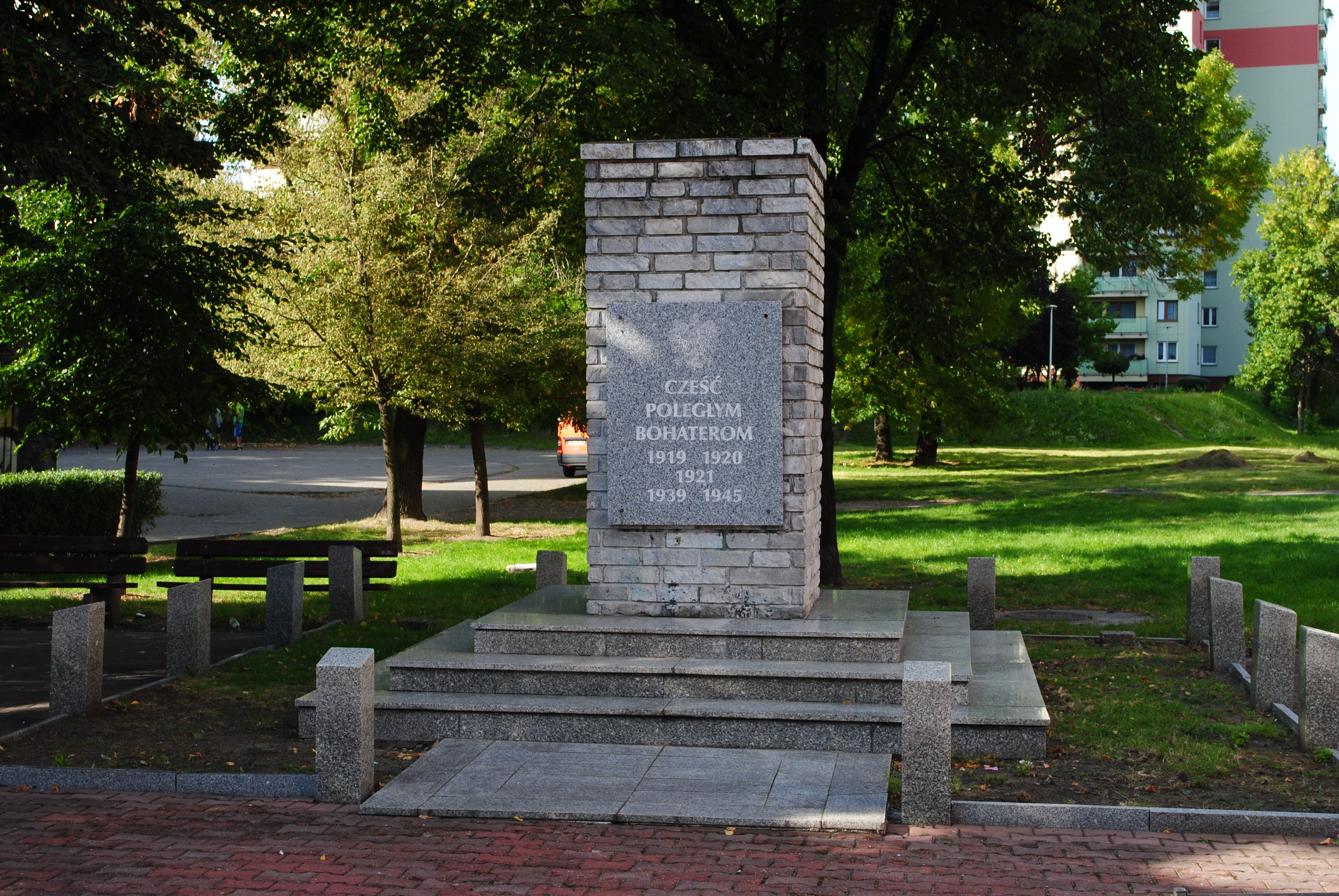
Monument to the Silesian Insurgents from 1951 at W. Wajda Square

The Polish People's Republic period was a time of intense development for Bogucice. Immediately after World War II, a colony of Finnish houses was built, and in the following years, apartment blocks began to be erected on behalf of the Katowice Coal Mine. Between 1950 and 1956, Walenty Roździeński Avenue was established – the name was officially assigned on 30 October 1956. In 1951, the current monument to the Silesian Insurgents was erected at Wincenty Wajda Square. From 1953 to 1956, the Bogucice mine was called "Stalinogród". In the 1970s, Leopold Markiefka Street was modernized and a new shopping pavilion was built there. A large road junction (known as the FSM junction) was built in the area of the intersection of Bogucicka and L. Markiefka streets in place of allotment gardens, connecting W. Roździeński Avenue with Murckowska and Bagienna streets. Construction work began in January 1976. The 1970s and 1980s were a time of residential construction development in the district. New housing estates were built during this period: Osiedle Kukuczki, Osiedle W. Wajdy, Osiedle Na Alpach, and Osiedle Ścigały. In 1985, the construction of the Church of the Baptist Christian Congregation at Morawska Street was completed.

Following the political transformation in Poland, on 16 September 1991, the Katowice City Council adopted a resolution dividing Katowice into 22 auxiliary local government units and 22 areas of operation on 1 January 1992. One of these units, designated no. 13, became "Bogucice". On 2 September 1991, Primary School No. 40, and a year later, a Catholic Primary School, began operating in Bogucice. On 26 June 1996, pursuant to an ordinance, the Katowice Coal Mine was merged with the Kleofas Coal Mine. The newly created plant was given the name "Katowice-Kleofas". In July 1999, mining operations in Section II “Katowice” were completed.

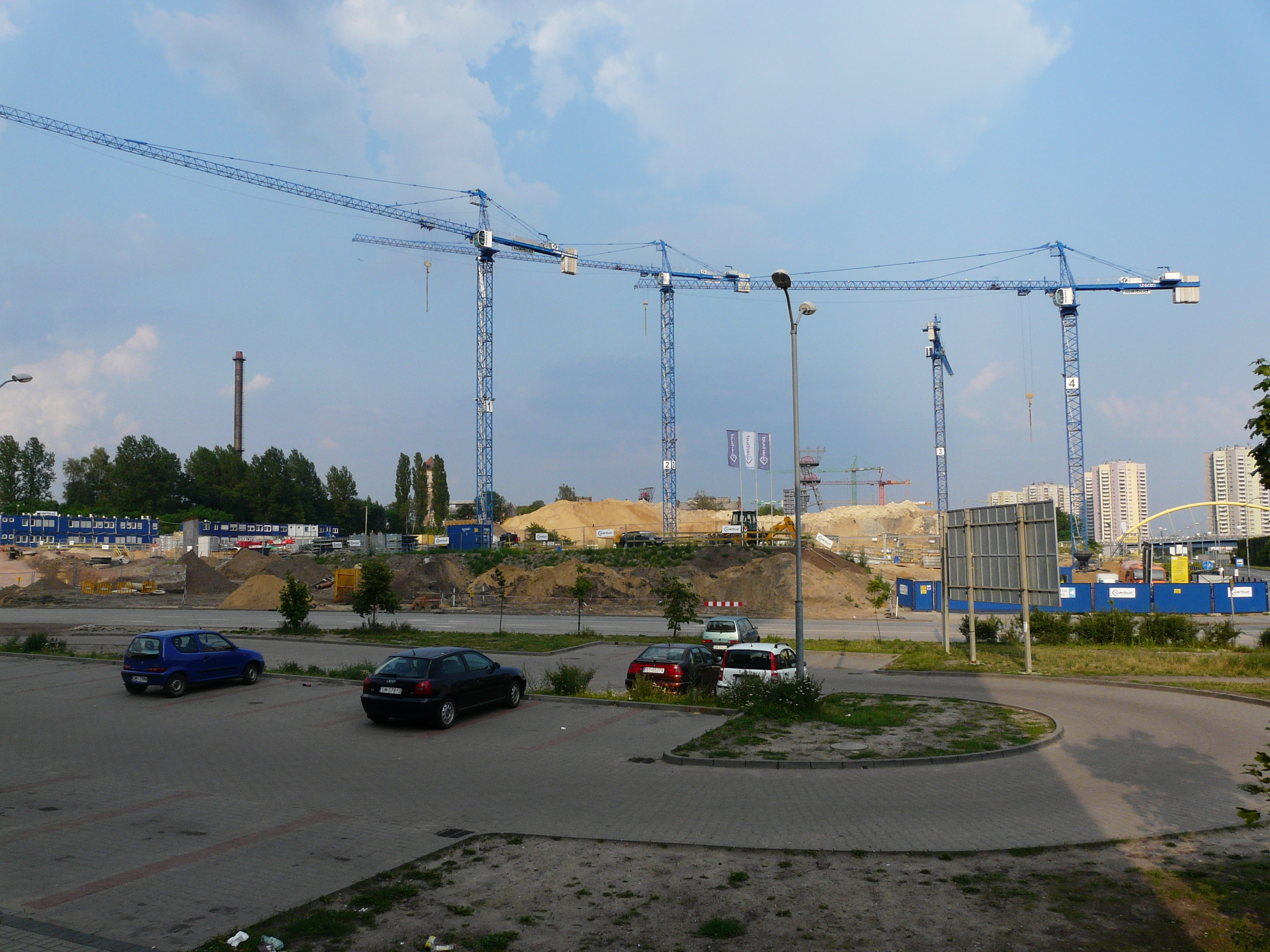
Construction of the Culture Zone – the headquarters of the Polish National Radio Symphony Orchestra and the Silesian Museum (July 2012)

On 4 June 2000, the painting of Our Lady of Bogucice was ceremoniously crowned with papal crowns consecrated a year earlier in Gliwice by Pope John Paul II. In 2003, the footbridge over W. Roździeński Avenue was demolished and replaced with an underground passage. Three years later, Leszek Jęczmyk – a resident of Bogucice – won the title of Silesian of the Year 2006 during the 16th edition of the Po naszymu, czyli po śląsku (In Our Way, or in Silesian) competition, which took place on 22 October 2006. After a 70-year break, the Order of the Brothers Hospitallers, under the patronage of the Guardian Angels in Katowice, took over the buildings of Municipal Hospital No. 1 on 1 April 2009. On 15 October 2010, on the 650th anniversary of Bogucice, the Bogucice Municipal Cultural Center was officially reopened after two years of renovation.

The Culture Zone was established on the site of the former Katowice Coal Mine. Between 2011 and 2014, the new headquarters of the Silesian Museum was under construction, and its opening took place on 26 June 2015. The new road layout in the Culture Zone was opened on 11 June 2014. These roads, located in the southwestern part of the district, provided faster car connections with Katowice and other cities in the region. Later that year, on 1 October 2014, the new headquarters of the Polish National Radio Symphony Orchestra was officially opened. A month later, on 21–22 November 2014, the 80th anniversary of the Katowice Brass Band, formerly the mine orchestra at the Katowice Coal Mine, was celebrated. On 21 June 2015, Archbishop Celestino Migliore, the Apostolic Nuncio in Poland, elevated St. Stephen's Church to the rank of minor basilica.

== Demography ==
Population structure in Bogucice by gender and age (as of 31 December 2015)
Period/Number of inhabitants	pre-working age (0–18 years)	working age (18–60/65 years)	post-working age (over 60/65 years)	Total
Total	2,175	9,367	2,887	14,429
women	1,064	4,461	1,962	7,487
men	1,111	4,906	925	6,942
Feminization index	96	91	193	108

Some of the earliest data on the population of Bogucice date back to 1668, when the village was inhabited by 24 farmers and their families. Sources from the 17th and 18th centuries indicate that Bogucie was inhabited exclusively by Poles at that time. In the 1630s, the residents included Jan Kowol, Barbara Bednarska, Mikołaj Dwornik, Marcin Ligęza, and Teodor Jurczyk. The Cadaster of Charles VI from between 1723 and 1725 indicates that there were 44 farms in the present-day district, including 21 smallholdings and 23 cottages. In the second half of the 18th century, there were 26 farms belonging to wealthy peasants, 17 smallholdings, and 17 cottagers. In 1738, there were 4 wealthy peasants, 12 smallholders, and 17 cottagers living there, while in 1798 there were 15 wealthy peasants, 4 smallholders, and 6 cottagers. Between 1745 and 1755, the Bogucice parish records mention 8 noble families from Katowice, Karbowa, and Bogucice. In 1783, the village had 157 or 255 inhabitants. In 1800, smallholders were the largest group in the social and occupational structure of Bogucice, numbering 73 people, alongside 26 wealthy peasants and 3 cottagers.

A rapid increase in the number of inhabitants was recorded in the 19th century with the development of industrial activity in Bogucice. The new inhabitants were mainly economic migrants. In 1817, Bogucice had 339 inhabitants, including 2 wealthy peasants, 22 smallholders, 48 cottagers, and 1 miller. By 1825, the population had grown to 553 people. The large increase in population over eight years was related to the establishment of the Fanny Zinc Smelter and the Ferdinand Coal Mine (later the Katowice Coal Mine) during this period. According to a visitation report from 15 October 1828, 662 people lived in Bogucice, and of the 2,437 people in the parish, 2,353 were Catholics, 41 were Evangelicals, and 42 were Jews. The population grew steadily – in 1840, Bogucice had 956 inhabitants, five years later 1,342, in 1855, 2,348 or 2,384, and by 1861, the number of inhabitants fluctuated around 2,970. In 1867, Bogucice had a population of 3,764.

In 1871, Bogucice had 4,495 inhabitants, including 4,376 in the gmina and 119 in the manor area. At that time, in terms of origin, 96.6% of the inhabitants of Gmina Bogucice were former citizens of Prussia, while 3.4% were from other countries. Of all inhabitants, 38.7% were born in the gmina, 57.6% came from other parts of Prussia, and those born in another country accounted for 3.7% of the village's population. In 1873, 134 boys and 126 girls were born into Catholic families in Bogucice, and 221 funerals of residents were held at that time. At the turn of the 19th and 20th centuries, the number of births per 1,000 inhabitants per year ranged from 56.7 to 61.7‰ and was higher than the average for the entire Katowice County. In 1890, Gmina Bogucice had a population of 8,098, in 1900 – 14,537, and in 1910 (or 1919) – 22,292. Gmina Bogucice-Zawodzie, with an area of 1,104 ha, had 23,993 inhabitants after its incorporation into Katowice in 1924. In 1927, District II Bogucice-Zawodzie had 24,930 inhabitants; by 1931, the number had risen to 25,702, and by 1938 to 27,239.

Since the 1990s, there has been a systematic decline in the number of residents in Bogucice. In 2005, 16,951 people lived there, and two years later, at the end of 2007, Bogucice had 16,538 residents, which accounted for 5.2% of the city's inhabitants. The population density of the district during this period was 5,947 people per km², which was one of the highest among all districts of Katowice and significantly higher than the average for the entire city, which was 1,916 people per km² at that time. In 2010, Bogucice was home to 15,733 people (5.1% of the city's population), while in 2011, the district had 15,424 inhabitants, with a population density of 5,607.55 people per km². During this period, 15% of Bogucice's residents were of pre-working age, 70.3% were of working age, and 14.7% were of post-working age. According to a survey conducted in 2011, 53.3% of residents declared Polish nationality, 18.3% Silesian nationality, and 28.3% both Silesian and Polish nationality. At the end of 2013, Bogucice was inhabited by 14,871 people, including 1,755 people under the age of 14, 1,970 women over the age of 60, and 918 men over the age of 65, while the number of people over 75 in the district at that time was 778.

Sources: 1783 (or 157 inhabitants); 1817; 1825; 1828 (15 October); 1840; 1845; 1855 (or 2,348 people); 1861; 1867; 1871 (including 4,376 people in Gmina Bogucice and 119 in the manorial area); 1880; 1885; 1890; 1895; 1900; 1905; 1910 (or 1919); 1924; 1931; 1938; 1988; 1997; 2005 (31 December); 2010 (31 December); 2015 (31 December); 2020 (31 December).

== Politics and administration ==
District No. 13 Bogucice is one of 22 districts of Katowice, constituting an auxiliary unit of the gmina. It was established by a resolution of the Katowice City Council as local government unit No. 13 on 1 January 1992. According to Resolution No. XLVI/449/97 of the Katowice City Council of 29 September 1997, Bogucice is a statutory district within the group of downtown districts. The current by-law of the district was established by Resolution No. XLI/903/21 of the Katowice City Council on 25 November 2021. In accordance with the provisions of the by-law, the district authorities are the District Council and the District Management Board. The District Council consists of 15 councilors elected for a five-year term. It is the decision-making body of the district, and its tasks include, among others, submitting requests from district residents to the authorities of the city of Katowice regarding the district's activities, initiating and organizing special celebrations, cultural, sports, and recreational events, issuing opinions on local initiatives, and submitting requests in matters concerning the city that affect the district. The District Management Board is the executive body of the district. The Chairman of the Management Board represents the district externally, and the tasks of the Management Board include accepting requests from district residents, organizing and coordinating social initiatives, informing residents about district matters, and preparing draft resolutions of the District Council.

Bogucice has a Council and Management Board, based in the district branch of the Bogucice-Zawodzie Cultural Center at 44a L. Markiefka Street. As of June 2022, the chair of the District Council was Jowita Hercig, while the chair of the District Management Board was Anna Malik. In 2021, representatives of the council and the board took part in a series of informational and educational meetings and cultural events held in Bogucice. They represented the district during municipal and local celebrations organized, among others, by the Bogucice-Zawodzie Cultural Center and schools, in the Festival of Non-Governmental Organizations, training sessions, and at sessions of the Katowice City Council. At that time, councilors actively participated in subsequent editions of the Katowice participatory budget and local initiatives.

Historically, Bogucice was located in the Mysłowice region. The Mysłowice estate was part of the Free State. Earlier, from the 14th century, it belonged to the Pszczyna castellany, and in the 13th century to the Mikołów castellany. In 1360, Nicholas II sold the area of present-day Katowice – Bogucice, Jaźwce, Roździeń, Szopienice, and Załęże – to Otto of Pilcza, while retaining sovereignty over them. The owners of Bogucice changed as often as the owners of the Pszczyna and Mysłowice estates. In 1480, the Mysłowice estate was taken over from the dukes of Opole by Casimir of Cieszyn, who ceded it to Aleksy Turzon in 1517. Nineteen years later, in 1536, Stanisław Salomon became the owner of the estate. He led to the separation of the Mysłowice entail from the Duchy of Pless. In 1637, after the marriage of Jadwiga Salomonówna to Krzysztof Mieroszewski, the estate passed into the hands of the Mieroszewski family. In 1839, Aleksander Mieroszewski sold the Mysłowice estate, together with Bogucice, to Maria von Winckler. In 1851, it was taken over by Hubert von Tiele-Winckler.

After 1742, when Prussia annexed most of Silesia, counties were established in Upper Silesia, including Bytom and Pszczyna counties. When Oppeln was created after the Napoleonic Wars, the borders of some counties were also changed in 1818, while Bogucice, among others, was incorporated into the Bytom County. On 27 March 1873, a new Katowice County was separated from the Bytom County, which was caused by a rapid increase in the number of inhabitants in this area. Katowice became the capital of the county, and the newly established unit also included the gmina and manor area of Bogucice.

On 1 January 1874, new administrative units called administrative districts (German: Amtsbezirk) were established in six eastern provinces of Prussia, including Upper Silesia, covering several gminas or manorial areas. In the Katowice County, to which Bogucice belonged at the time, the Bogucice administrative district was established, comprising the rural gmina and the manorial area. The first head of the district office was based at the Kunegunda Zinc Smelter in Zawodzie. At the beginning of the 20th century, a joint gmina of Bogucice and Zawodzie was established, though Antoni Steuer points out that Zawodzie has never been a separate gmina, as this is not documented anywhere.

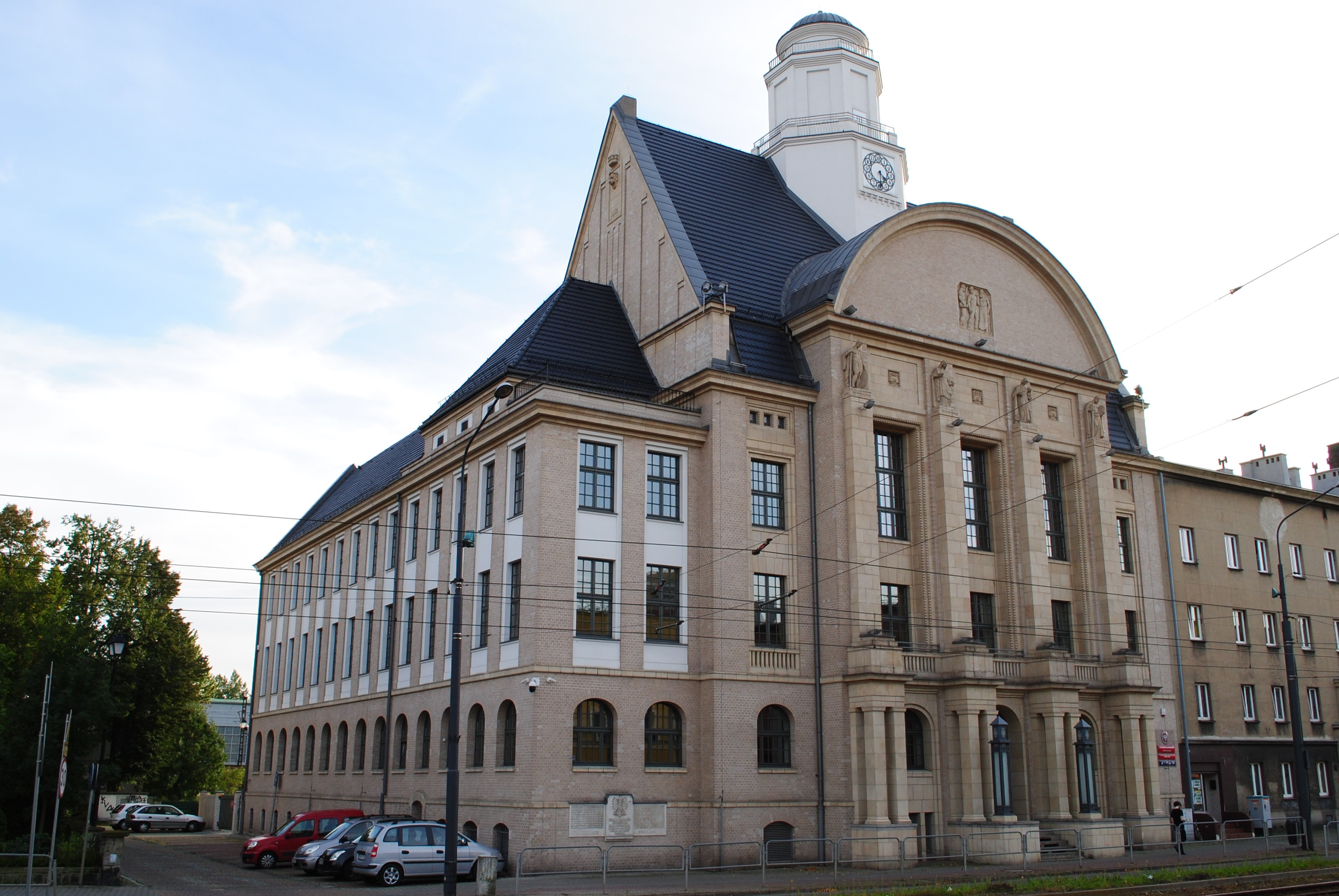
Building of the former Gmina Bogucice town hall in Zawodzie; currently the rectorate of the University of Economics (50 1 Maja Street)

The manor area in Bogucice was located southwest of the village – the later Katowice Coal Mine was built on its territory. On 1 January 1901, this area was incorporated into Gmina Bogucice, and on 1 January 1913, it was reduced in size, excluding approximately 50 hectares of land located near the present-day Spodek arena in Koszutka, which was transferred to the Katowice manor area. In return, Gmina Bogucice received plots of land in Zawodzie and the sum of 100,000 marks. On 1 April 1919, part of the Katowice manor area north of the city center was incorporated into Bogucice, which was protested by the authorities of the city. In 1912, the building of Gmina Bogucice town hall was opened on 1 Maja Street in Zawodzie. By virtue of a resolution of the gmina's council on 1 May 1918, Bogucice was renamed "Bogutschütz-Nord", while Zawodzie was renamed "Bogutschütz-Süd". Two years later, on 10 March 1920, the new gmina council changed the name to "Bogutschütz-Zawodzie". In 1922, after the incorporation of part of Upper Silesia into Poland, Gmina Bogucice remained part of the Katowice County.

Under an Act of the Silesian Parliament of 15 July 1924, it was decided to incorporate, among others, Gmina Bogucice into Katowice. The Act came into force on 15 October 1924. In 1925, due to the expansion of the city's borders and the increase in the number of inhabitants, the City Council divided Katowice into districts. At that time, the district of Bogucice-Zawodzie was also established, covering, among others, the area of the present-day Bogucice.

Following the occupation of Poland by Nazi Germany in 1939, the new authorities restored the official names of places in Katowice to their pre-1922 status. On 3 February 1942, a new administrative division of the city was established by virtue of a decree issued by the president of the Province of Upper Silesia. At that time, Bogucice, together with Zawodzie, became part of the Kattowitz-Ost district. After the Polish authorities took over the administration of Katowice in 1945, the legal status of 1 September 1939 was restored. In 1954, present-day Katowice (then named Stalinogród) was divided into three districts, with Bogucice becoming part of the Bogucice-Zawodzie district. The Presidium of the District National Council was located in what is now Śródmieście, first at 20 Warszawska Street, then at 4/6 Mariacka Street. This division was abolished in 1973.

=== Seal emblem ===
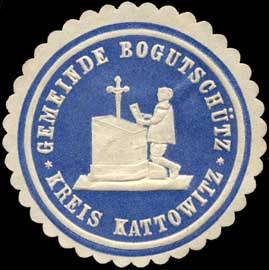
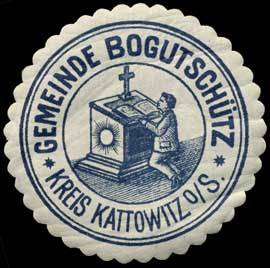
Pre-war seals of the former Gmina Bogucice in two different versions of the emblem

The oldest preserved seals of Bogucice date back to 1723 and are known from the Carolinian Cadaster. The first emblem of the district is also from this period. The seal from 1723 depicted an equal-armed cross with extended ends and had no legend. However, it was quickly forgotten, as it was replaced with others on new stamps made half a century later during the Prussian period. The emblem established at that time was used continuously until the end of the independent gmina's existence.

The Bogucice coat of arms was religious in nature and depicted a scene of prayer. The emblem on the seal, starting with the one from 1818, depicts a scene with a man kneeling in front of an altar with a crucifix. He is dressed in secular clothing – a jacket and trousers cut open at the side – and he is holding an open prayer book. On seals from between 1906 and 1922 and newer, the emblem is modified – it depicts a man with his hands folded in prayer, kneeling before an altar with a crucifix and an open book.

== Economy ==
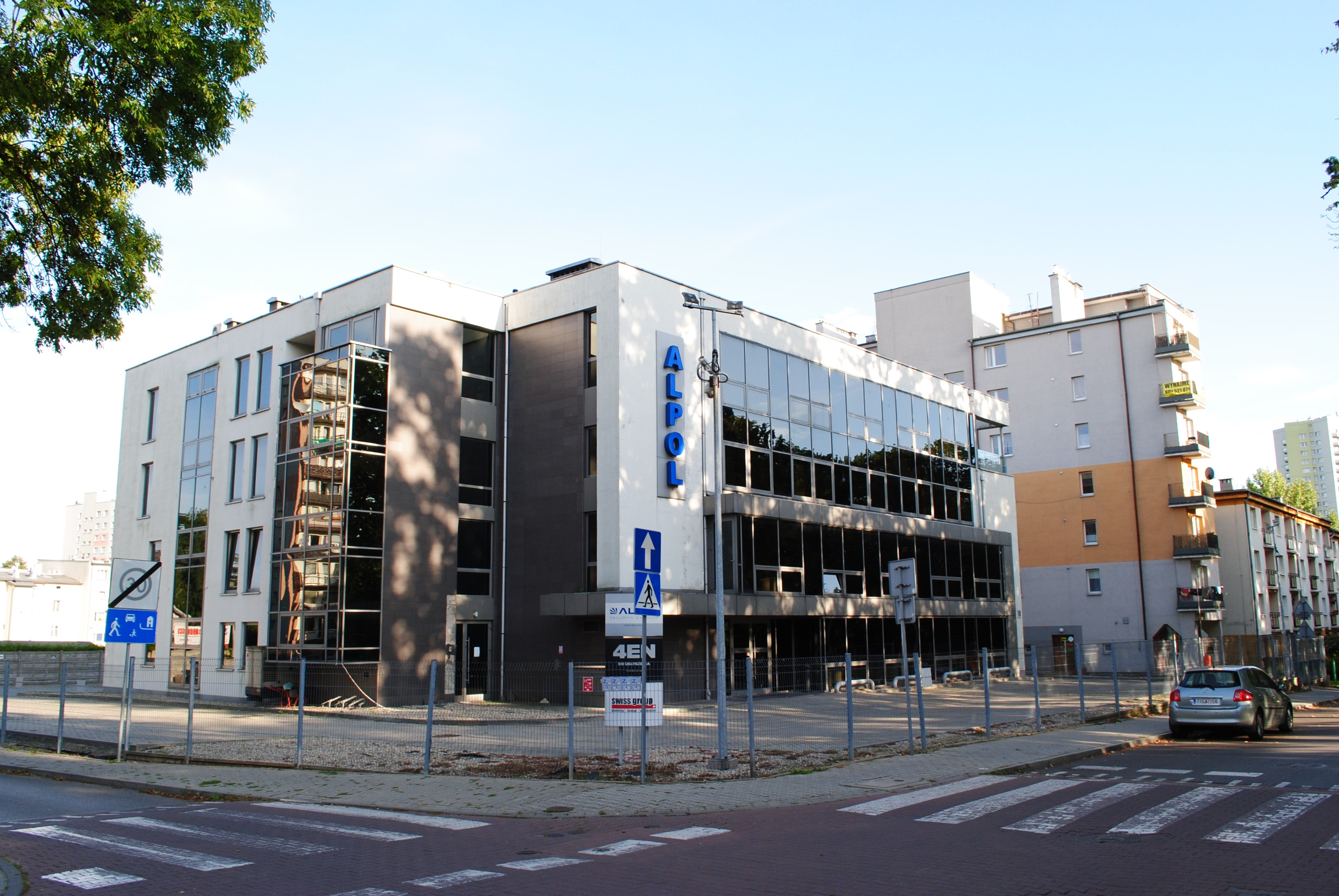
Office building at F. Ścigała Street

Since the closure of the Katowice Coal Mine, Bogucice has mainly served as a residential area. Recently, however, it has been supplemented by cultural activities related to the dynamically developing Culture Zone, in which new facilities have been located in the Bogucice part: the headquarters of the Polish National Radio Symphony Orchestra and the Silesian Museum. Other functions of the district include scientific and research (EMAG Institute of Innovative Technologies at Leopolda Street), as well as business (conducted in modernized and newly built office spaces on F. Ścigała Street, including Equity Investments Katowice). The distribution of commercial and service outlets in Bogucice is linear, running along L. Markiefka Street, with services usually located on the ground floors of buildings adjacent to it.

As of 31 December 2013, there were 1,687 companies registered in the REGON system with their headquarters in Bogucice (3.7% of all companies in Katowice), of which 1,605 were micro-enterprises. At the end of 2013, 548 people in Bogucice were unemployed, which at that time accounted for 3.69% of the district's population. Of these, 83 were under the age of 25, and 215 were long-term unemployed.

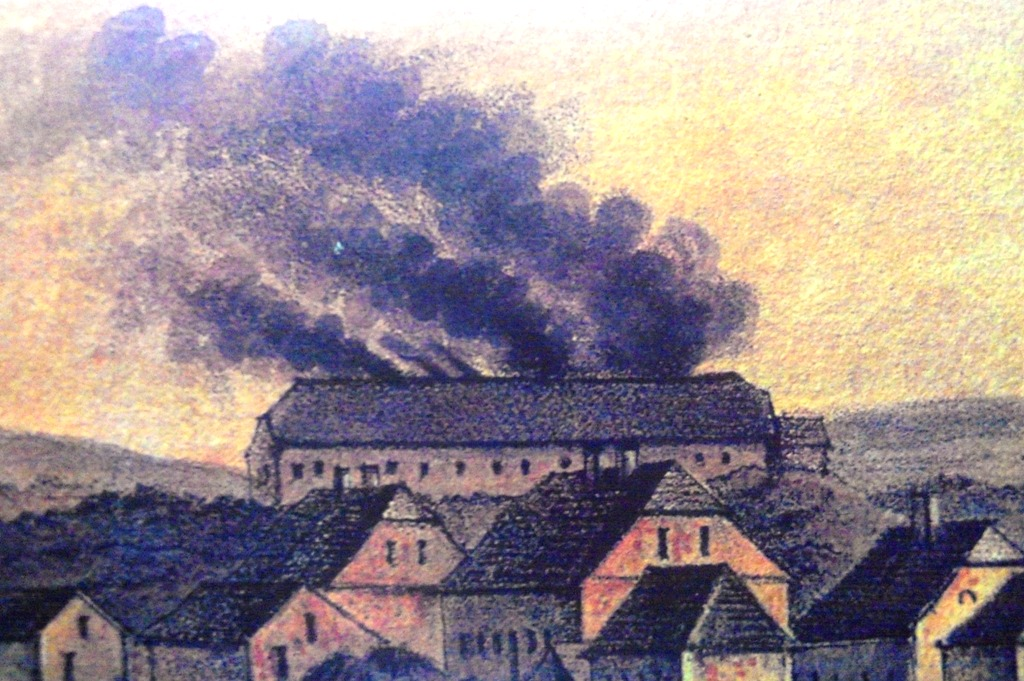
Smoke over the Fanny Zinc Smelter – a lithograph by Ernest Knippel, mid-19th century

Historically, heavy industry related to zinc smelting and coal mining initially developed in Bogucice. Franz and Fanny zinc smelters were established there. Founded in 1818, Franz smelter was merged with Fanny in 1860 to form the combined Fanny-Franz plant. Another zinc smelter, Norma, was established on the north-eastern side of Bogucice. It began operations in 1842 and was owned by Aleksander Schreiber, then Friedrich Eduard von Löbbecke, and later by Adolf Wolff. It operated in a single hall, which housed 10 individual 20-muffle furnaces. In the early days of its operation, 50 employees worked there, and it initially supplied 240 tons of zinc per year. A workers' colony called Norma was established next to the smelter. On 1 November 1880 (or in 1881) the Norma Zinc Smelter became the property of the Georg von Giesches Erben concern. It was modernized, and in 1905, the smelter supplied 1,700 tons of zinc and employed 79 people. At the beginning of the 20th century, the plant was already outdated, and the company in Roździeń launched a new Bernhardi Zinc Smelter. Norma was finally shut down on 1 April 1906.

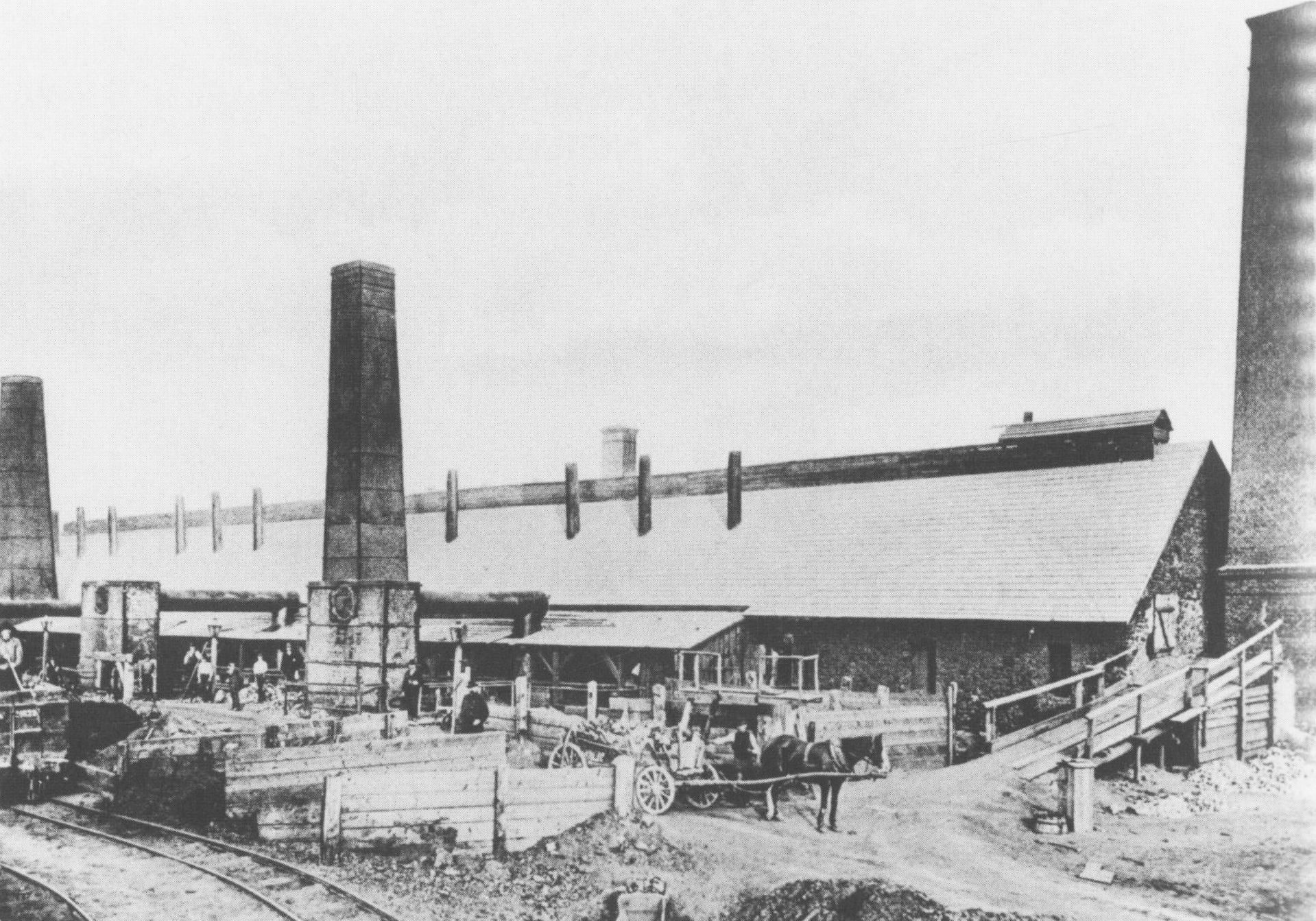
Norma Zinc Smelter in Bogucice – photograph from around 1900

The Ferdinand Coal Mine (later renamed "Ferdynand" and then "Katowice") was established on land in the village of Bogucice and partly in Katowice. It was one of the longest-operating mines in the entire Katowice area, operating from 1823 to 1999. Work on its construction began as early as 1822. On 3 May 1823, the Mining Office in Brzeg granted the mine its concession, which was confirmed in Berlin on 21 May 1823. The application for the concession was submitted in Tarnowskie Góry on 8 August 1822 by cavalry captain and salt factor Ignatz Ferdinand von Beym, and the original name of the mine came from the applicant's middle name. It originally belonged to a mining company established on 14 October 1823. Stanisław Mieroszewski had the most shares, and after his death, they were inherited by his son Aleksander Mieroszewski. Von Beym had 20 shares, while Izaak Freund from Tarnowskie Góry had 29.

In its first year of operation, the mine produced 3,100 tons of coal. After acquiring the Mysłowice entail estate in 1839, the Wincklers received, in addition to land and priority rights to exploit mineral resources, 61 shares in the Ferdinand mine and 30.5 shares in the Belle-Alliance mine, located at that time in present-day Koszutka. The area of operation of the Ferdinand mine was expanded in 1844, and during this period the mine supplied hard coal to the nearby Fanny Zinc Smelter. Pursuant to a decision of the Mining Court in Tarnowskie Góry, on 19 June 1845, the Ferdinand mine was consolidated with the Bertram plant, which was established in Bogucice at the request of Franz von Winckler on 18 August 1841. The mine was granted a charter in Brzeg on 22 July 1842 and confirmation in Berlin on 23 July of the same year.

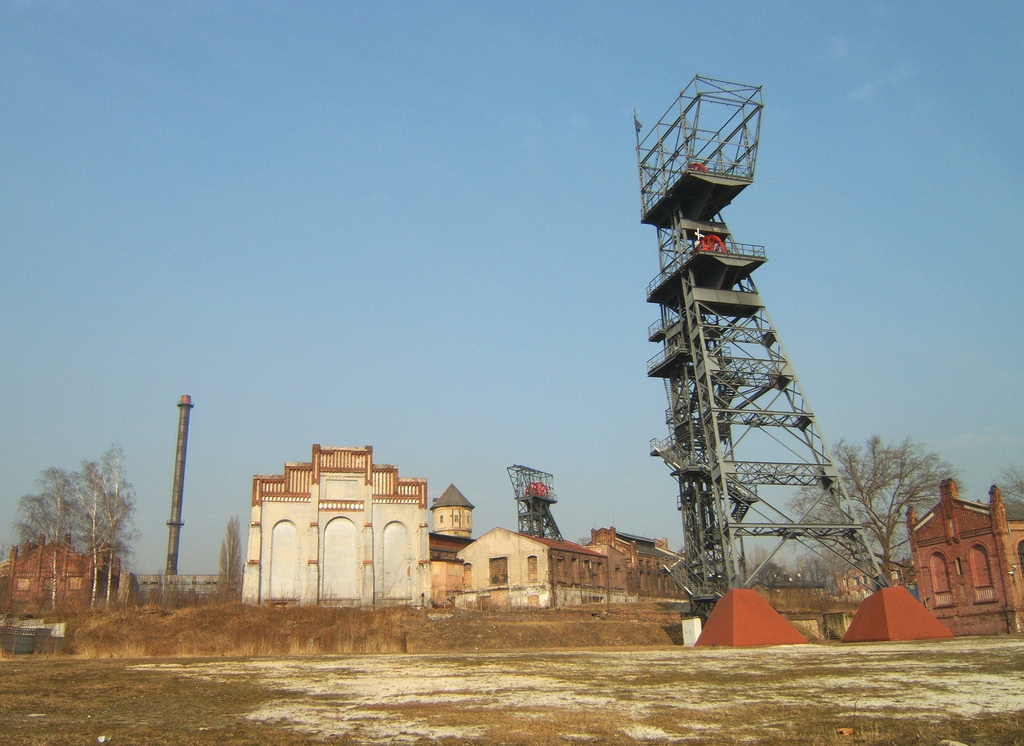
Site of the former Katowice Coal Mine in 2011

In 1875, the Ferdinand mine was flooded, and it took a year and a half to pump out the water and repair the damage. On 25 November 1885, the Artur mine, together with the Belle-Alliance, Belle-Alliance II, Pfarrfeld, and Kattowitz fields, was incorporated into the consolidated Ferdinand mine, which was taken over by the Katowice Joint-Stock Company for Mining and Metallurgy in 1889. By 1900, the mine employed over 2,100 workers and produced 701,500 tons of coal. In 1937, the Ferdynand mine became part of the Mining and Metallurgical Interest Group. In 1936, it was renamed from "Ferdynand" to "Katowice", but after the German occupation of Bogucice in 1939, it reverted to its original name.

In 1978, the Katowice mine produced 1.8 million tons of coal, employing 3,400 workers. On 26 June 1996, by order of the President of the Katowice Coal Holding Company, the Katowice mine was merged with the Kleofas Coal Mine, establishing the Katowice-Kleofas Coal Mine, divided into Shaft I – Kleofas – and Shaft II – Katowice. In its last year of independent operation, the mine supplied 1.3 million tons of coal and employed 2,800 people. Due to its continued unprofitability, the mine's operations were terminated in 1999 – mining was completed in July, and liquidation work continued until 30 June 2001.

Bogucice has deposits of loam for building ceramics, but their exploitation was abandoned in the past. One of the two brickyards of the Katowice mine operated at 5 Nadgórników Street. It was established in 1904, when a brick drying and sorting facility was built, and in 1905, the brickworks was equipped with kilns. It operated until the 1970s, producing building bricks from clay extracted from a nearby clay pit.

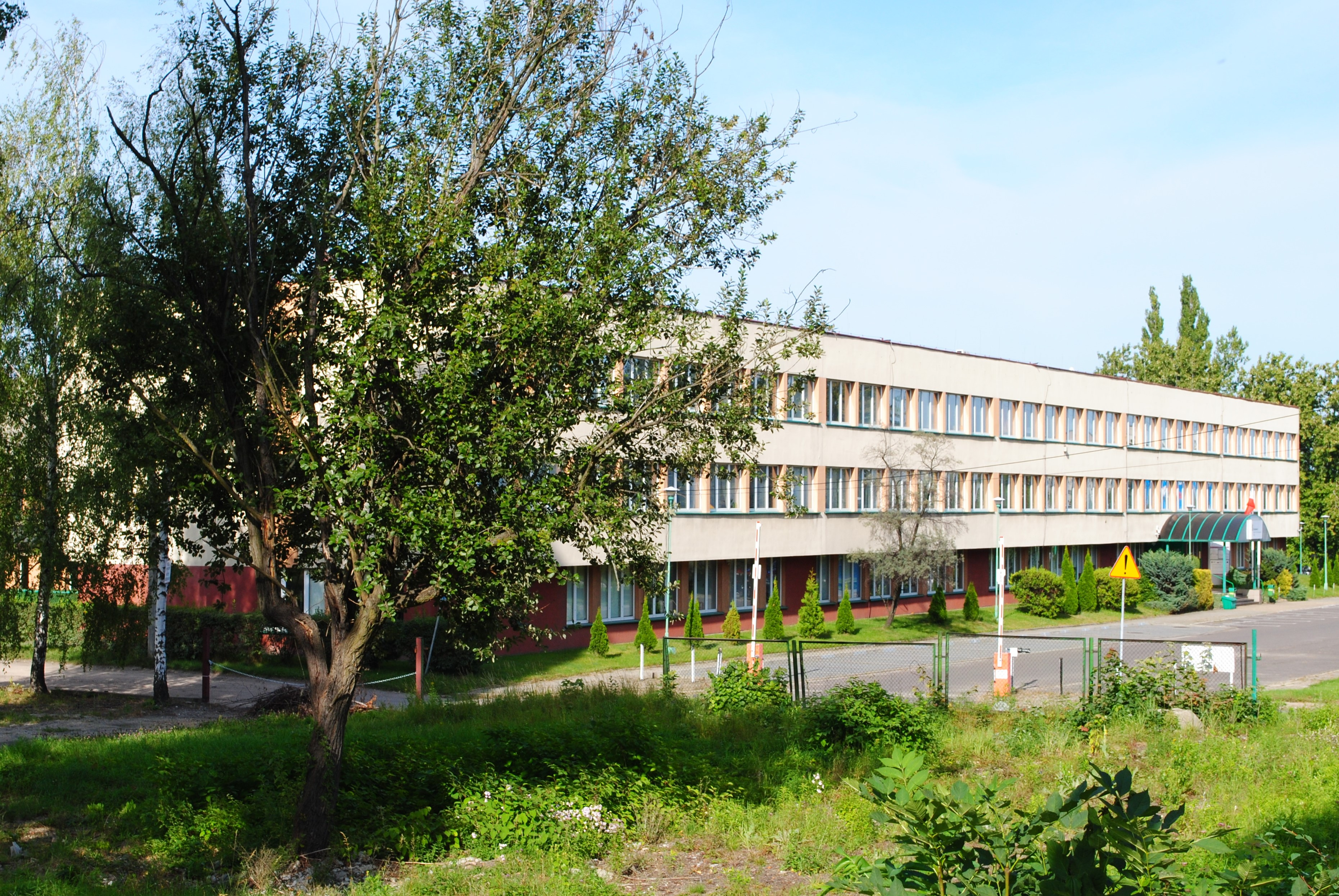
Headquarters of the Łukasiewicz Research Network – EMAG Institute of Innovative Technologies (31 Leopolda Street)

One of the most important institutions in Bogucice is the EMAG Institute of Innovative Technologies. Its history dates back to 1957, when the Central Office for the Design of Mining Machinery merged with the Institute for the Mechanization of Mining to form the Experimental and Design Institute of the Coal Industry, which was renamed the Design and Mechanization Works of the Coal Industry in 1958. Pursuant to the order of the Minister of Mining and Energy of 30 December 1975, the Research and Development Center for Systems of Mechanization, Electrical Engineering and Mining Automation was established. Within a dozen or so years of its establishment, the institute achieved the status of an important scientific and research center, especially in the field of industrial automation, safety and natural hazard monitoring systems, and equipment. In 1990, the EMAG Research and Development Center for Electrical Engineering and Mining Automation was created, which two years later was renamed the EMAG Center for the Electrification and Automation of Mining. Since 1 April 2019, the institute has been a co-founder of the Łukasiewicz Research Network. Currently, the Łukasiewicz Research Network – EMAG Institute of Innovative Technologies conducts scientific research and development work in various fields, mainly in the areas of computer science, telecommunications, information technology in monitoring, computer engineering, automation and electronics, and environmental engineering. It is located at 31 Leopolda Street.

One of Poland's leading furniture companies, Agata, has its headquarters at 93 W. Roździeński Avenue. The company's history dates back to 1952 and is linked to a company established at that time called Bytom Furniture Factory. In 2022, Agata had 32 large-format stores throughout the country, including in Bogucice. In its vicinity, there is an IKEA warehouse, while the store itself is located in Dąbrówka Mała.

Other notable businesses in Bogucice include a branch of the SLAWEX pharmaceutical wholesaler (31 Leopolda Street), a branch of AAA AUTO used car dealer (91 W. Roździeński Avenue), and ALPOL, a distributor of security systems solutions (10 F. Ścigała Street).

== Technical infrastructure ==
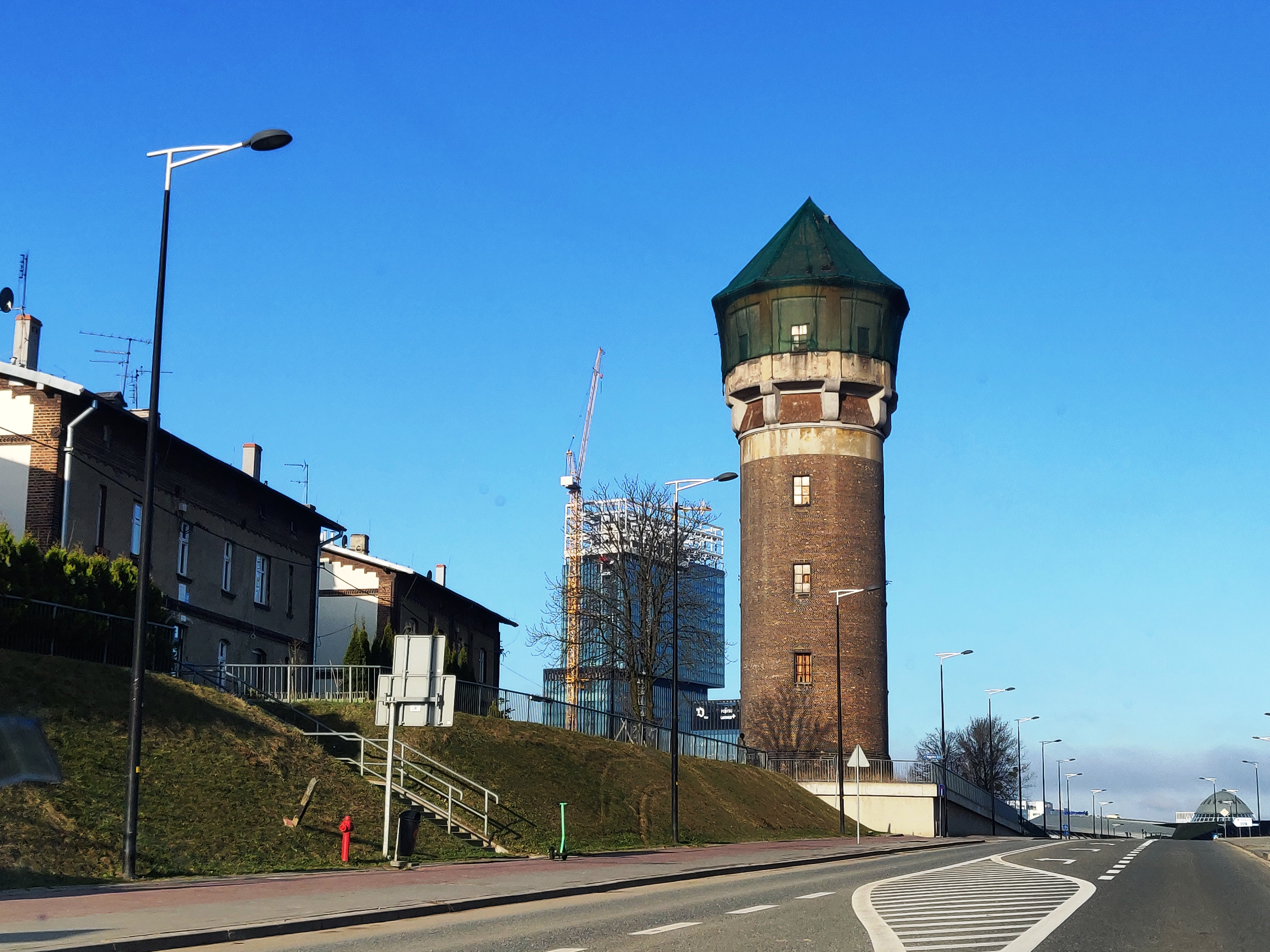
Water tower situated at H.M. Górecki Street

Bogucice is supplied with running water from the Mikołów and Murcki network reservoirs, which are fed from water treatment plants in Dziećkowice, Goczałkowice-Zdrój, and Kobiernice. This water is pumped into the shared distribution system of the Upper Silesian Water Supply Company, from where it is supplied to Bogucice, among other places, via a system of water mains and the associated distribution network of Katowice Waterworks. A Upper Silesian Water Supply Company transit water pipeline runs through Bogucice along J. Ordon, K. Mieroszewski, L. Markiefka, Normy, Podhalańska, Bohaterów Monte Cassino, and Leopolda streets. The average water consumption in Katowice in 2012 per person was 36.3 m³.

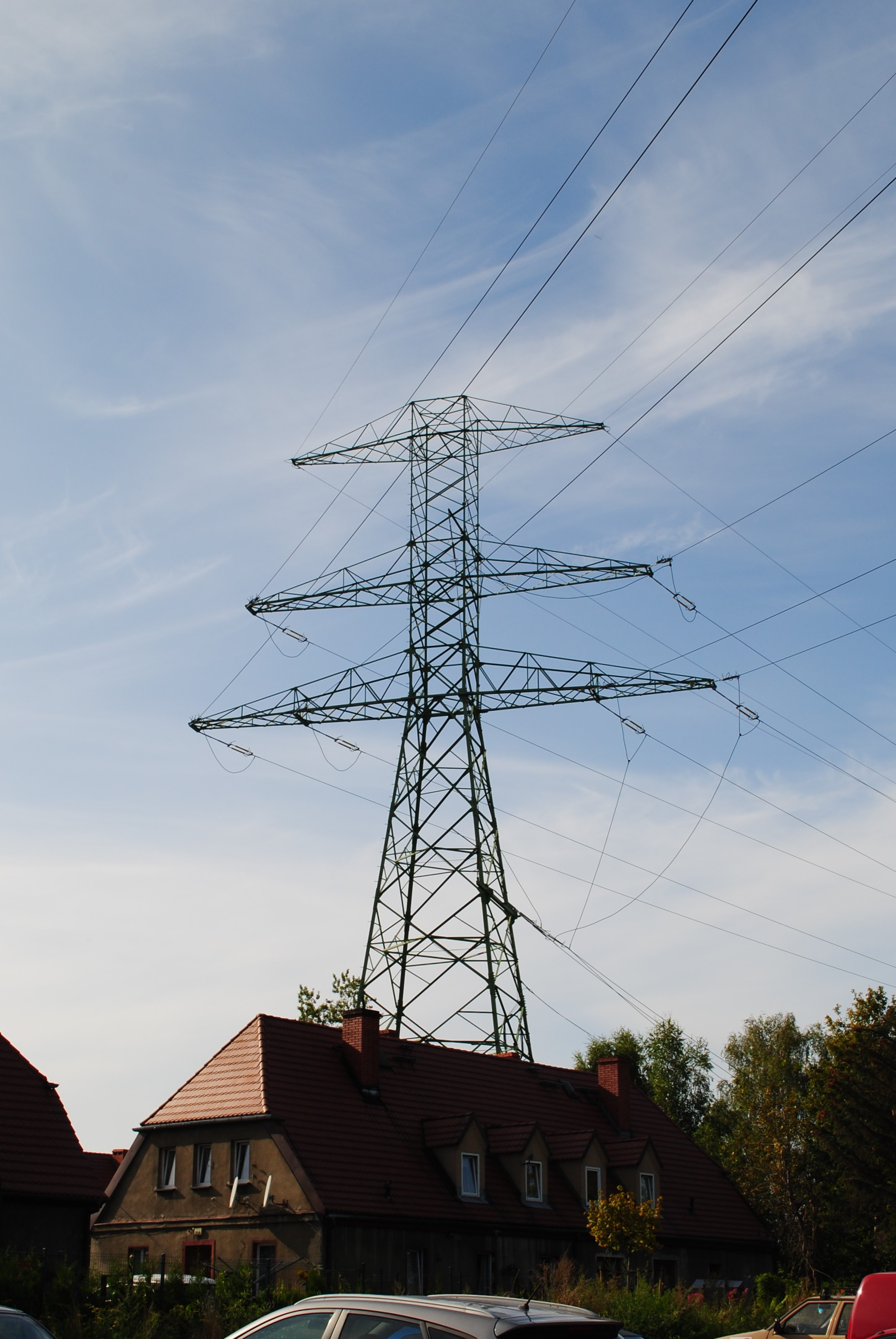
Electrical grid pylon in the area of Leopolda Street

Thanks to the Ferdinand (Katowice) mine, Bogucice gained access to the water supply network even before Katowice. The water supply system in the district was built between 1870 and 1871 by the mine, intended to compensate the residents of Bogucice for the losses caused by the drying up of wells as a result of mining operations. Public pumps were installed along the current L. Markiefka Street, from which residents could draw water free of charge. 7 pumps were installed on the street at that time. This system existed in this form until 1 January 1910, when Gmina Bogucice took over the water supply network from the mine. Between 1895 and 1897, a branch of the water supply system leading from Alfred Colony through Koszutka to Katowice was extended towards Bogucice. Water from this main was supplied from the flooded ore mine in Dąbrówka Wielka. From 1910, the Ferdinand mine used water intakes on the Leśny Stream, and before 1914, it built a water tower on Nadgórników Street. Between 1929 and 1931, a new intake was built on the Biała Przemsza river in Maczki, from where a main pipeline was laid from Sosnowiec to Dąbrówka Mała, Pniaki, Bogucice, and Dąb, improving the supply of running water to Katowice. In 1938, 95.3% of buildings in the Bogucice-Zawodzie district had access to the water supply network.

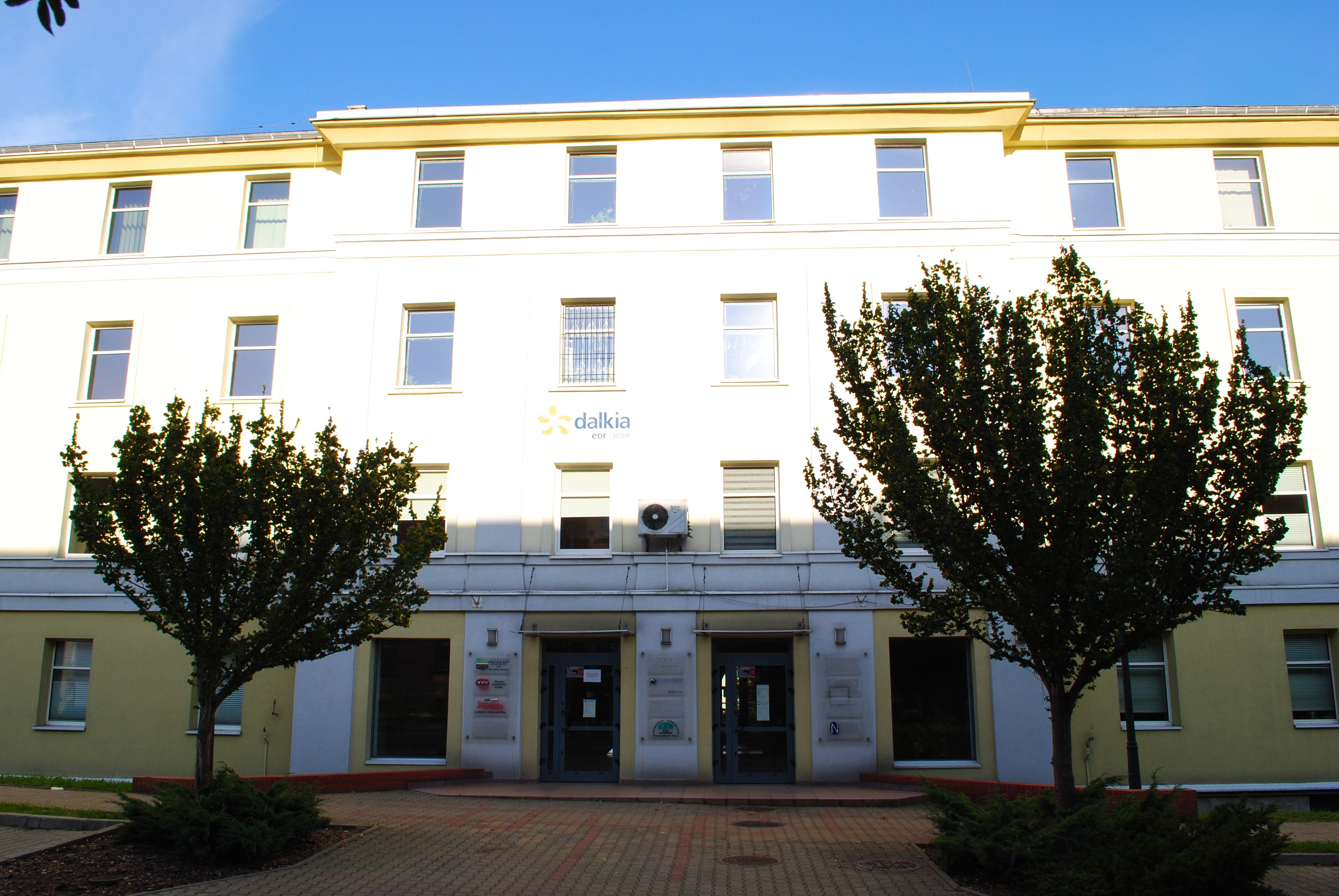
Headquarters of Dalkia Polska Energia (14 F. Ścigała Street)

The sewage system in Bogucice is located in the catchment area of the Gigablok Sewage Treatment Plant, which is located in the catchment area of Rawa river. The sanitary and combined sewerage network in the district is operated by the Sewerage Network Operation Department – Center, which belongs to Katowice Waterworks, while the storm water drainage system is managed by the Municipal Road and Bridge Authority. In Bogucice and Osiedle Kukuczki, the sewage system is divided into sanitary and storm water systems, while one of the main combined sewer collectors runs along Ludwika, L. Markiefka, Nadgórników, F. Ścigała, and Kopalniana streets.

As early as 1902, Gmina Bogucice planned to canalize the ditch running along the present-day L. Markiefka Street, into which all sewage flowed. Ultimately, a decision was made to build an entire network, including a sewage treatment plant. It was designed in 1906 by Max Rosenquist. By the end of 1907, a combined sewer system had been built in Bogucice, and the entire network, including Zawodzie, was launched in November 1908. About 200 connections to the sewage system were made. In 1938, 93.3% of buildings in the Bogucice-Zawodzie district were connected to the sewage system.

The district is supplied with electricity via a 110 kV high-voltage network connected to nearby power plants. The power grid runs through Bogucice parallel to Olimpijska Street and W. Roździeński Avenue (underground section in the Culture Zone) as well as Bohaterów Monte Cassino Street. One of the network lines crosses the cemetery on Walery Wróblewski Street and connects to the 110 kV EMAG substation located in the district. In addition, the 2×220 kV Łagisza–Katowice network runs through the eastern part of the district.

Between 1905 and 1966, a power plant with a capacity of 5.8 MW, and later 12.2 MW, operated at the Ferdinand/Katowice mine. It generated 16 million kWh per year on average.

The Chorzów Power Station supplies part of Bogucice with thermal energy. One of the main energy service providers in Metropolis GZM – Dalkia Polska Energia – has its headquarters in Bogucice at 14 F. Ścigała Street.

== Transport ==
=== Road transport ===
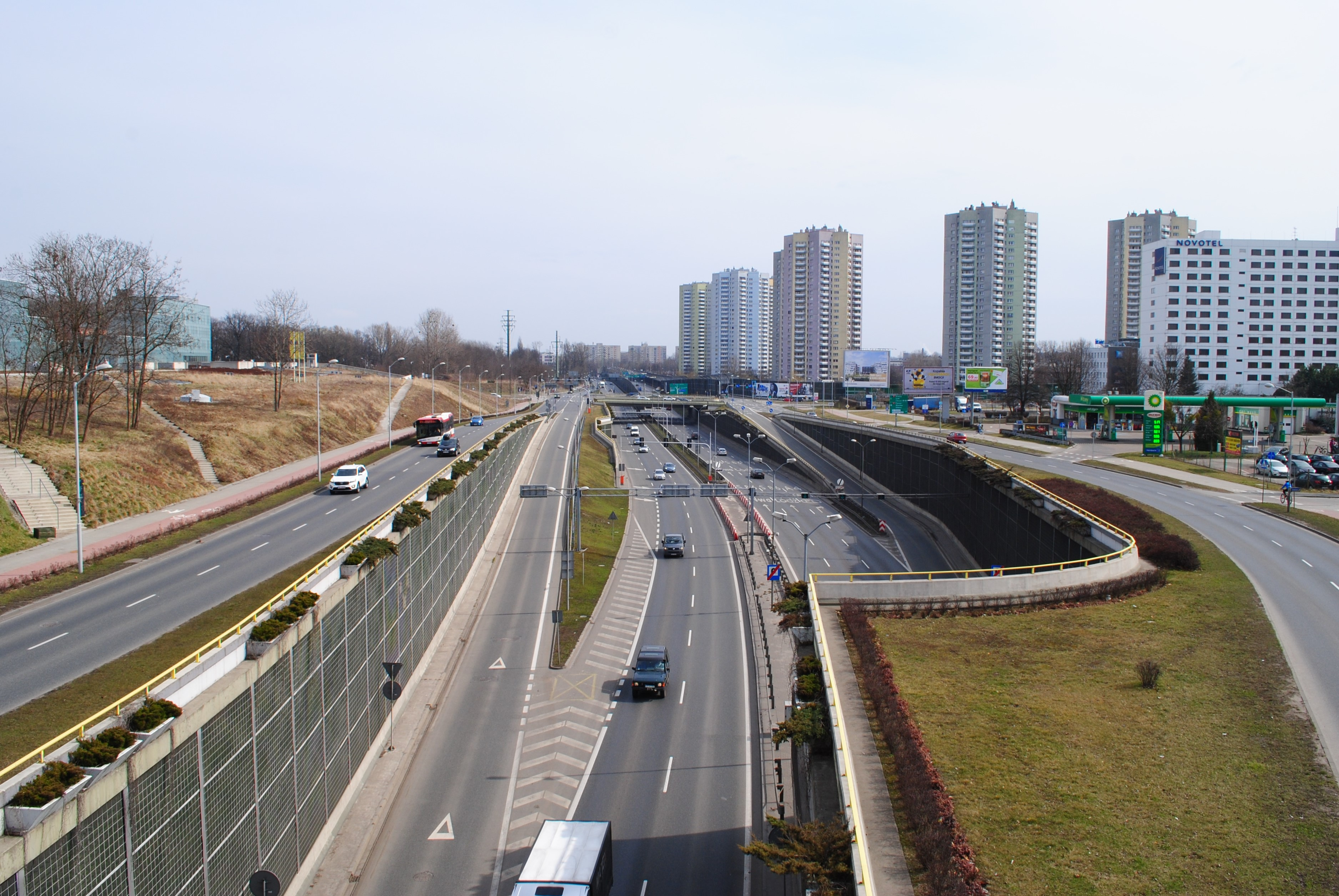
W. Roździeński Avenue at the level of the Culture Zone

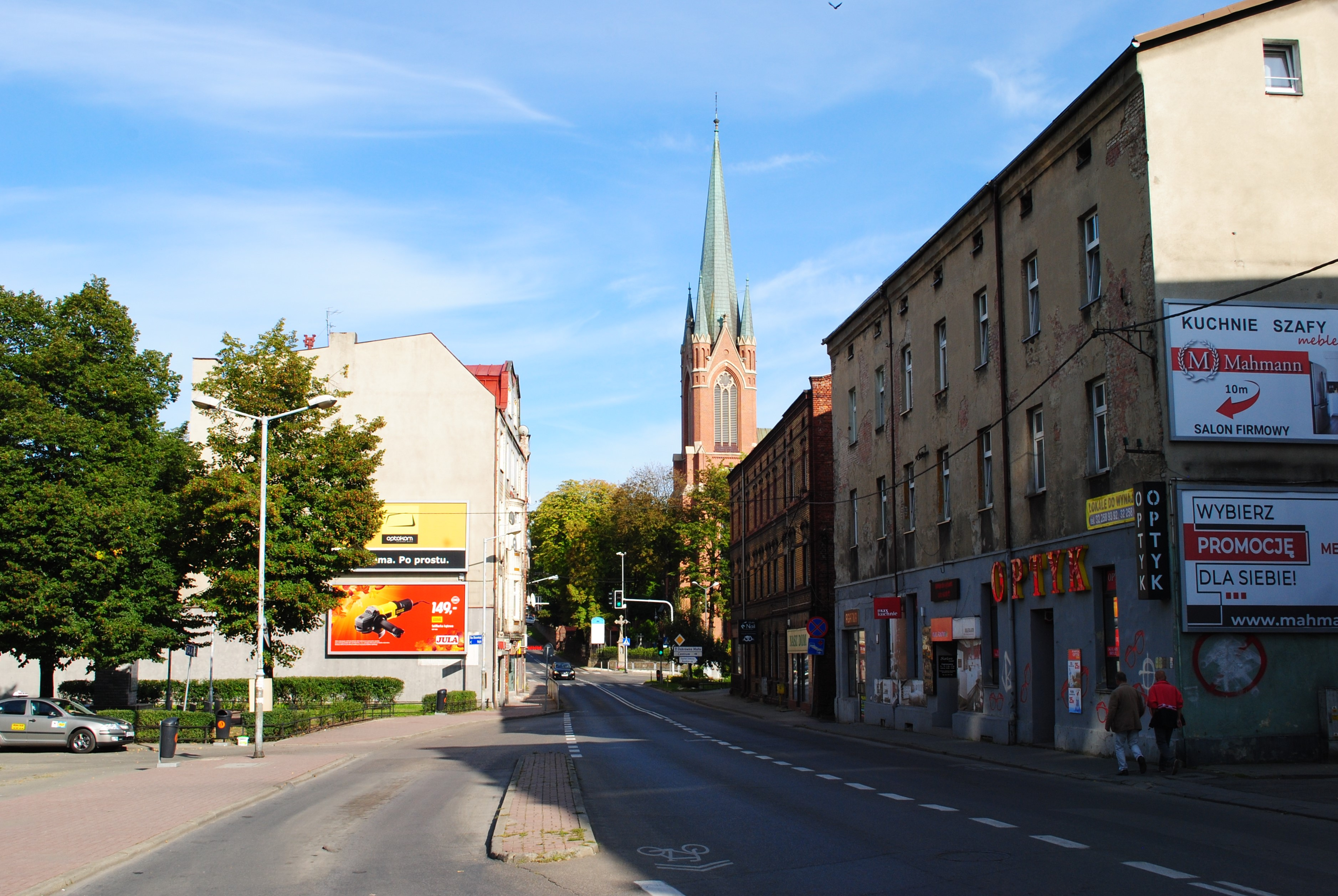
Bogucice section of Katowicka Street, looking east

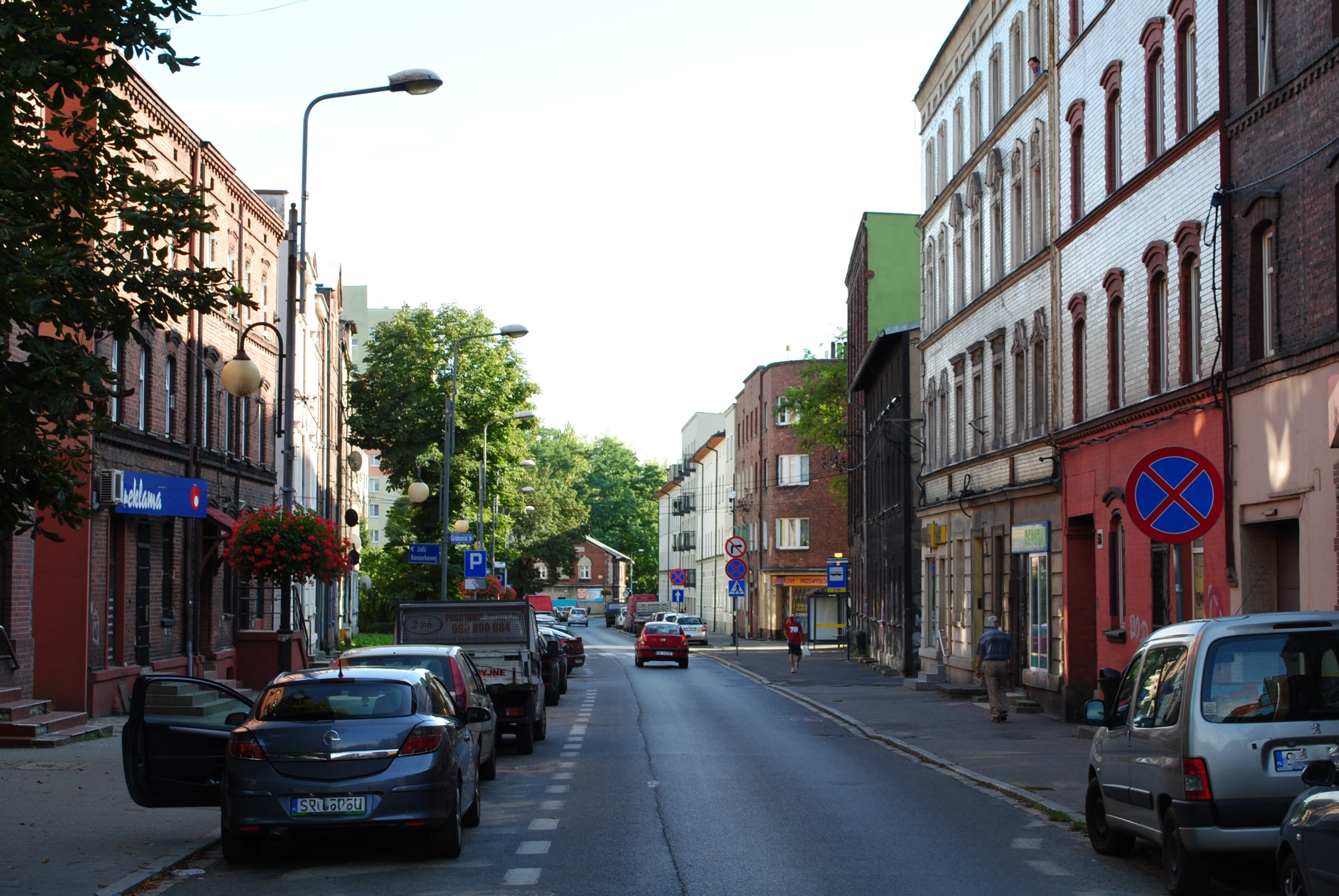
L. Markiefka Street, looking south

The following national roads and expressways pass through Bogucice:

- National road 79 (Walenty Roździeński Avenue to the Bagienna Street junction towards Chorzów) – one of the main thoroughfares of Katowice. It runs parallel to the southern part of Bogucice and provides a connection to Chorzów and Bytom in the west, and to Mysłowice, Jaworzno, Chrzanów, and Kraków in the east. In September 2007, the average hourly traffic volume during the afternoon rush hour between the intersection with Bogucicka Street and Jerzy Duda-Gracz Street was 6,581 vehicles, of which 90.2% were passenger cars;
- Expressway S86 and national road 86 (Walenty Roździeński Avenue from the Bagienna Street junction towards Sosnowiec) – one of the main thoroughfares of Katowice. The section of the road along W. Roździeński Avenue from the junction with Murckowska Street towards Sosnowiec is a two-lane expressway. Its internal function is to enable fast connections between distant areas of the entire city. It connects Bogucice in the south with Tychy, and in the north-east with Sosnowiec, Będzin, and the Katowice Airport in Pyrzowice.

The most important streets in the district include:

- Bohaterów Monte Cassino Street – a street with a length of 1,580 meters and a meridional course. It heads south towards Zawodzie, where it ends at the intersection with 1 Maja Street, while northwards it runs along the edge of Osiedle Kukuczki and ends at the intersection with Leopolda Street. It is a main county road;
- Katowicka Street – a 1,010-meter-long street connecting Bogucice with Koszutka from the west, where it ends at the intersection with Misjonarzy Oblatów MN Street and Wojciech Korfanty Avenue. It is a distributor county road;
- Leopolda Street – a street running roughly parallel to the equator, connecting Bogucice with Dąbrówka Mała at Osiedle Norma and Pniaki. It is a distributor county road;
- Leopold Markiefka Street – a 900-meter-long street, running through the main part of Bogucice with a course similar to a meridian. In the south, it intersects with W. Roździeński Avenue, which continues westward towards Koszutka, Śródmieście, and Zawodzie, while in the north, the street continues towards Osiedle Na Alpach. It is a local county road;
- Walery Wróblewski Street – a road running through the old part of Bogucice, parallel to the east of L. Markiefka Street, with a course similar to a meridian. It connects Leopolda Street at the Bogucice cemetery in the north with Ryszarda Street in the south. It is a local county road.

Transport links between Bogucice and Pniaki and the other macro-regions of Katowice are varied. The district has very connections with Śródmieście, not only via W. Roździeński Avenue, but also via a network of lower-class streets providing very good access, including Leopolda Street, Katowicka Street, W. Korfanty Avenue, Bohaterów Monte Cassino Street, 1 Maja Street, or Warszawska Street. As for the other macroregions, Bogucice and Pniaki have very good connections with Murcki and Giszowiec, Józefowiec, Koszutka, and Załęże, but insufficient connections with Ligota and Brynów.

=== Rail transport ===
Currently, there are no railways in Bogucice. The main railway station, Katowice railway station, located in Śródmieście, is about 3 km away.

Historically, the beginnings of the standard-gauge railway network in Bogucice date back to 1865, when a section of railway connecting the Katowice Coal Mine with a network of sidings leading to the Katowice railway station was built. This railway ran westward from the mine, parallel to W. Roździeński Avenue. Between 1958 and 1962, in connection with the reconstruction of the center of Katowice, the track layout in the area of the main mine shafts was also rebuilt, adapting it to the change in the direction of railway service from west to east, which also resulted in a change in the transport layout of this part of the city. The new tracks were laid on an embankment. Before 1960, a railway viaduct was also built over L. Markiefka Street.

Parallel to the new Katowice mine siding, the KP 207 sand railway connecting Borki, Roździeń, and the Katowice Coal Mine was also built, passing through Bogucice. The section between Borki and the Bogucice shaft was opened in 1961, and the railway was extended to the Katowice mine in 1967. It was electrified before 1985. After the mine was closed, the railway was dismantled in 2000. It ran within the district, parallel to the north of W. Roździeński Avenue.

A network of narrow-gauge railways, part of the Upper Silesian Narrow-Gauge Railway system, also ran within the boundaries of Bogucice. Railway no. 4004, running from Trójkąt Karb to Kopalnia Wujek, passed through Bogucice. The section connecting Paulina, Katowice Wschodnie, and Katowice Bogucice Wąskotorowe was opened in 1855. In 1961, the main siding of the Katowice mine was connected to the state narrow-gauge railway network near the Norma shaft. A new large delivery and collection station, Katowice Wschodnie, was built at the connection point. The Katowice Wschodnie station itself was opened in 1963 and closed in 1987. It was located within the road reserve of the present-day Bohaterów Monte Cassino Street, near Primary School No. 40. The section of the narrow-gauge railway between Siemianowice Śląskie and Katowice Szopienice via Bogucice was dismantled in 1998.

=== Bicycle transport ===
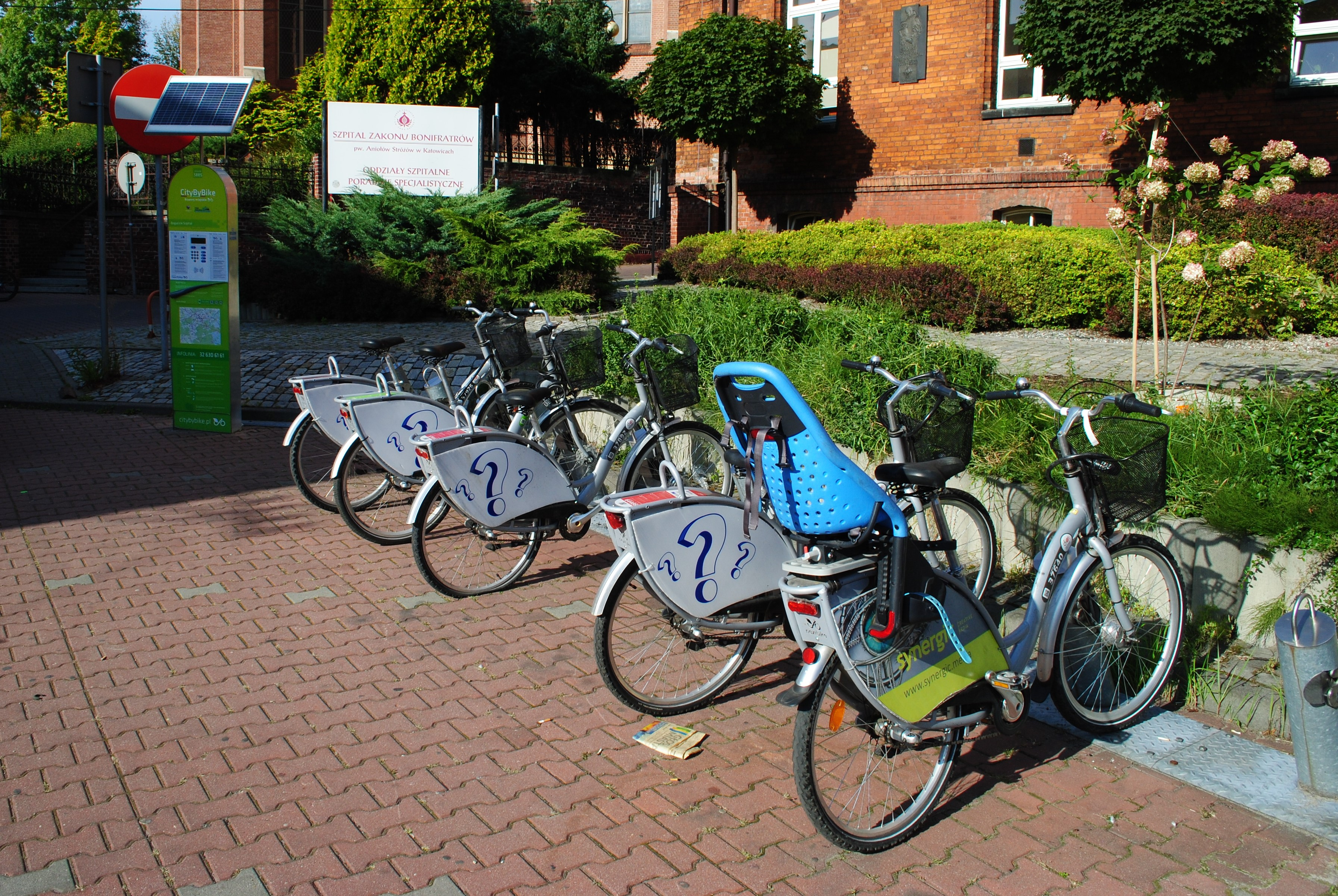
City by bike station 5885 Bogucice – Szpital (2020)

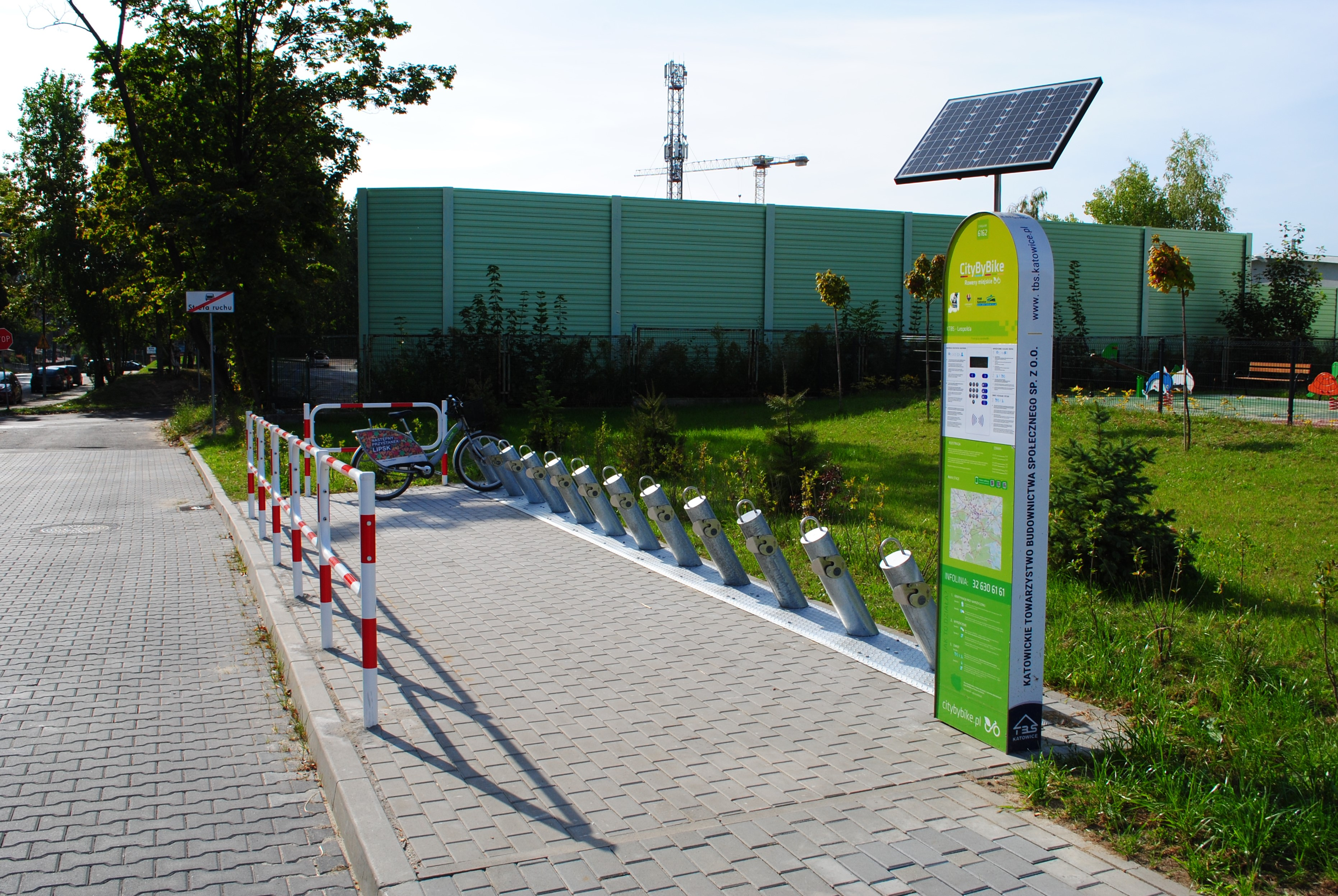
City by bike station 6162 KTBS – Leopolda (2020)

The bicycle infrastructure network in Bogucice is concentrated in the south-western and eastern parts of the district. According to the target bicycle path network published by the Katowice City Hall as of June 2022, this network is almost fully developed – the missing section is the route extending Bohaterów Monte Cassino Street northwards. All bicycle routes in the district are intended for transport purposes. However, there are no bicycle routes established as part of the "Cycling Through Silesia" project.

As of mid-2022, the following types of bicycle paths existed in Bogucice:

- Bicycle paths – Olimpijska Street, H.M. Górecki Street (southern part of the street; cobblestone path), Nadgórników Street (part of the route; on the south side of the street; cobblestone path), Leopolda Street (eastern part of the street; northern section made of cobblestones, southern section made of asphalt), Podhalańska Street (between Kurpiowska and Bohaterów Monte Cassino streets on both sides of the road; cobblestones), Bohaterów Monte Cassino Street (at Osiedle J. Kukuczki, path on both sides of the road, the remaining southern section of the path is on the eastern side of the street; western section paved with cobblestones, eastern section paved with asphalt), Wiertnicza Street (asphalt), and W. Roździeński Avenue (cobblestones);
- Pedestrian and bicycle routes – underpass under W. Roździeński Avenue between L. Markiefka and Bogucicka streets, and S. Skrzypek Street;
- Routes with permitted traffic on the sidewalk – a trail in the Culture Zone connecting the International Congress Center and Bogucice Park via a footbridge over Olimpijska Street, including the section from the intersection with J. Harald Street towards the University of Silesia campus.

Bogucice also has part of the city's bike rental network, Metrorower, which replaced the City by bike system. As of March 2024, the following stations operate there: 27064 (Osiedle W. Wajdy), 27067 (Wrocławska Street), 27171 (Koszycki Square), 27177 (Leopolda Street), 27181 (J. Harald Street), 27200 (L. Markiefka Street), 27672 (Sławik and Atalla Square), 27704 (Culture Zone), and 27708 (Bogucice Park).

=== Public transport ===
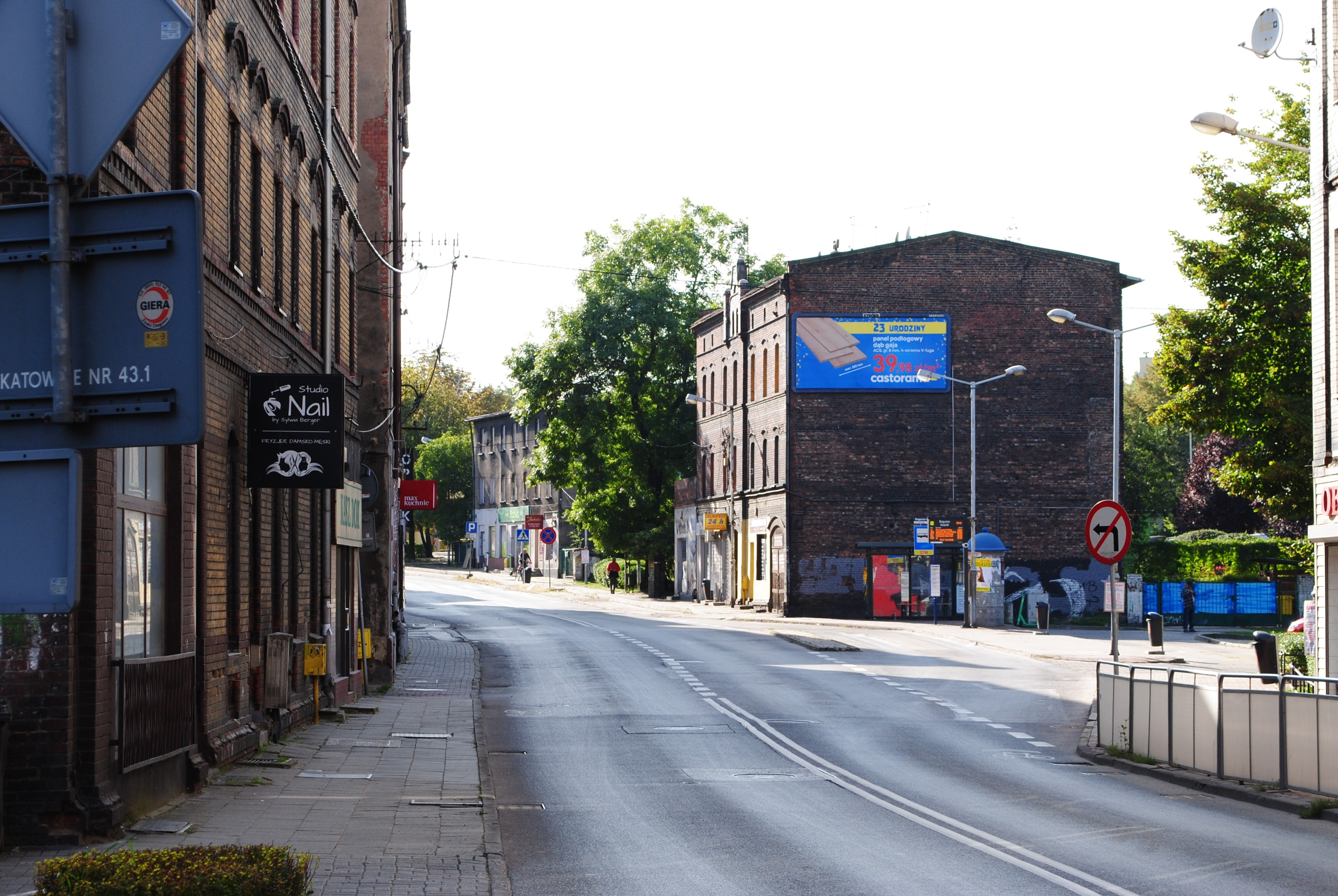
Part of Katowicka Street, with the Bogucice Kościół bus stop on the right

The organizer of public transport in Bogucice is the Metropolitan Transport Authority, which took over the responsibilities from the previous organizers on 1 January 2019. Public transport within the district operates only in the form of bus services, with the main operator in the district being the Katowice Municipal Transport Company.

As of June 2022, Bogucice has 12 bus stops: Bogucice Cmentarz, Bogucice Kościół, Bogucice Markiefki, Bogucice Skrzyżowanie, Bogucice Wróblewskiego, Dąbrówka Mała Pawilon Agata, Dąbrówka Mała Wiertnicza [on request] (southbound stop), Katowice Strefa Kultury (in the direction of Śródmieście), Katowice Strefa Kultury NOSPR (in the direction of Śródmieście), Osiedle Kukuczki DL Center Point, Osiedle Kukuczki Podhalańska, and Osiedle Kukuczki Sandomierska.

The largest bus stop in the central part of the district is Bogucice Kościół. As of mid-June 2022, 11 bus lines departed from it, including 2 night lines. They connect Bogucice with other parts and districts of Katowice, as well as with other cities of Metropolis GZM, including Będzin, Chorzów, Czeladź, Ruda Śląska, and Sosnowiec.

Before World War II, a plan was made for a tram line connecting Zawodzie with Dąbrówka Mała through Bogucice, but it was ultimately never built.

== Architecture and urban planning ==
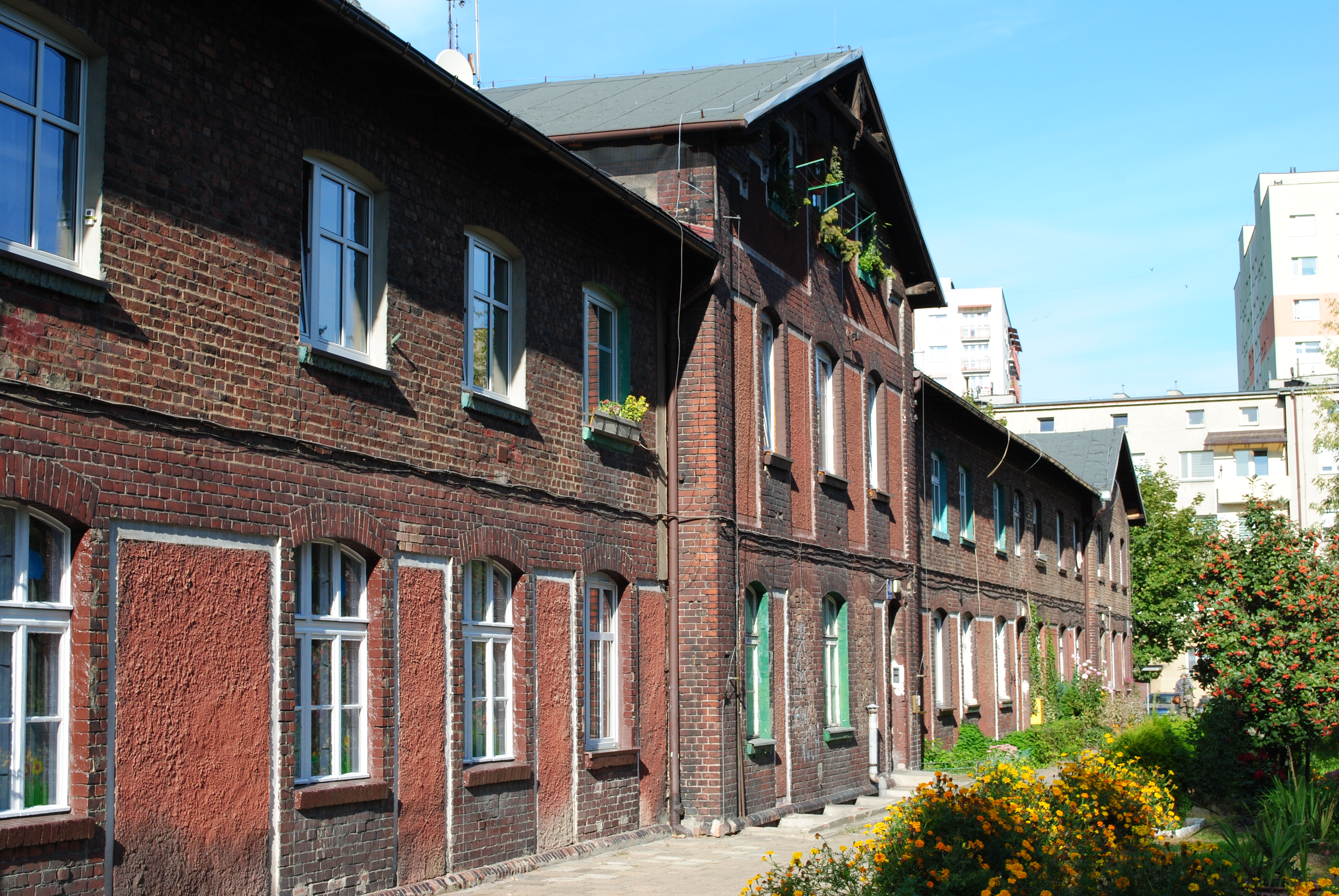
Buildings from 1910 near Kopalniana Street, where the Bogucice folwark was located in the past

Bogucice was established on previously uninhabited land. The settlement expanded rapidly from the 17th century. As new peasant cottages were built there, the village grew longer, forming a meridional layout, with buildings erected along the Bogucice Stream, which flows into the Roździanka (Rawa) river, with buildings on both sides. In the 18th century, wooden structures dominated the entire area of Katowice, including Bogucice, in the form of log cabins and farm buildings. From the mid-19th century, brick buildings replaced wooden ones, especially after the implementation of regulations prohibiting the use of timber in construction to reduce fire risk. The new brick buildings were unplastered and dominated the architecture of Bogucice in the first half of the 20th century.

A 1812 map shows farm buildings arranged in a quadrangle in the southern part of Bogucice. According to M. Bulsa, after World War II, the former farm buildings served as hotels for workers from the Katowice Coal Mine, while part of one of them, at 4d Kopalniana Street, now houses Municipal Kindergarten No. 22, and the other serves as residential accommodation. According to A. Frużyński, G. Grzegorek, P. Rygus, and M. Bednarek, the buildings on Kopalniana Street were built in 1910 and were originally lodgings for workers from the Ferdinand (Katowice) Coal Mine. The folwark itself was liquidated in 1901, and its only visible trace is the former brick stable, which now houses garages and workshops.

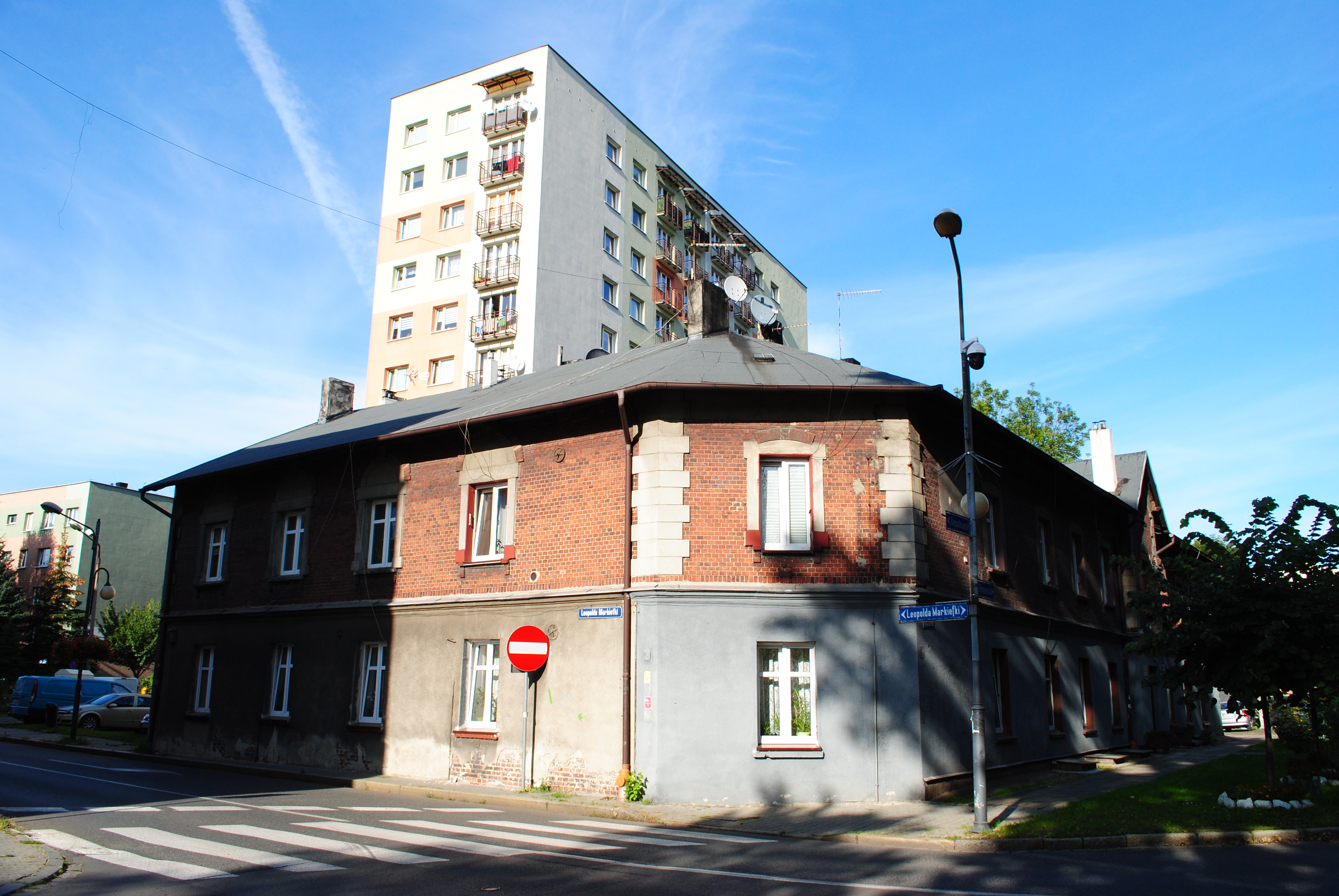
Former overnight lodging house for workers of the Ferdinand Coal Mine, at the corner of L. Markiefka and Ryszarda streets

A map from August 1822, updated in 1823, shows Bogucice as three rows of farms located meridionally along the Bogucice Stream. The western row was located on the west side of present-day F. Ścigała Street, beginning at the current Katowicka Street and ending at today's Kopalniana Street. The second row started in the south on the east side of the stream at present-day Ryszarda Street. From the old school on L. Markiefka Street, it extended towards the center of the plot currently occupied by the Bogucice hospital. The third row started at the crossroads near present-day Ryszarda and W. Wróblewski streets and reached today's Węglana Street on the western side. North of present-day Katowicka and Leopolda streets, there was a double row of farms, with several additional houses near the area of today's W. Wajda Square.

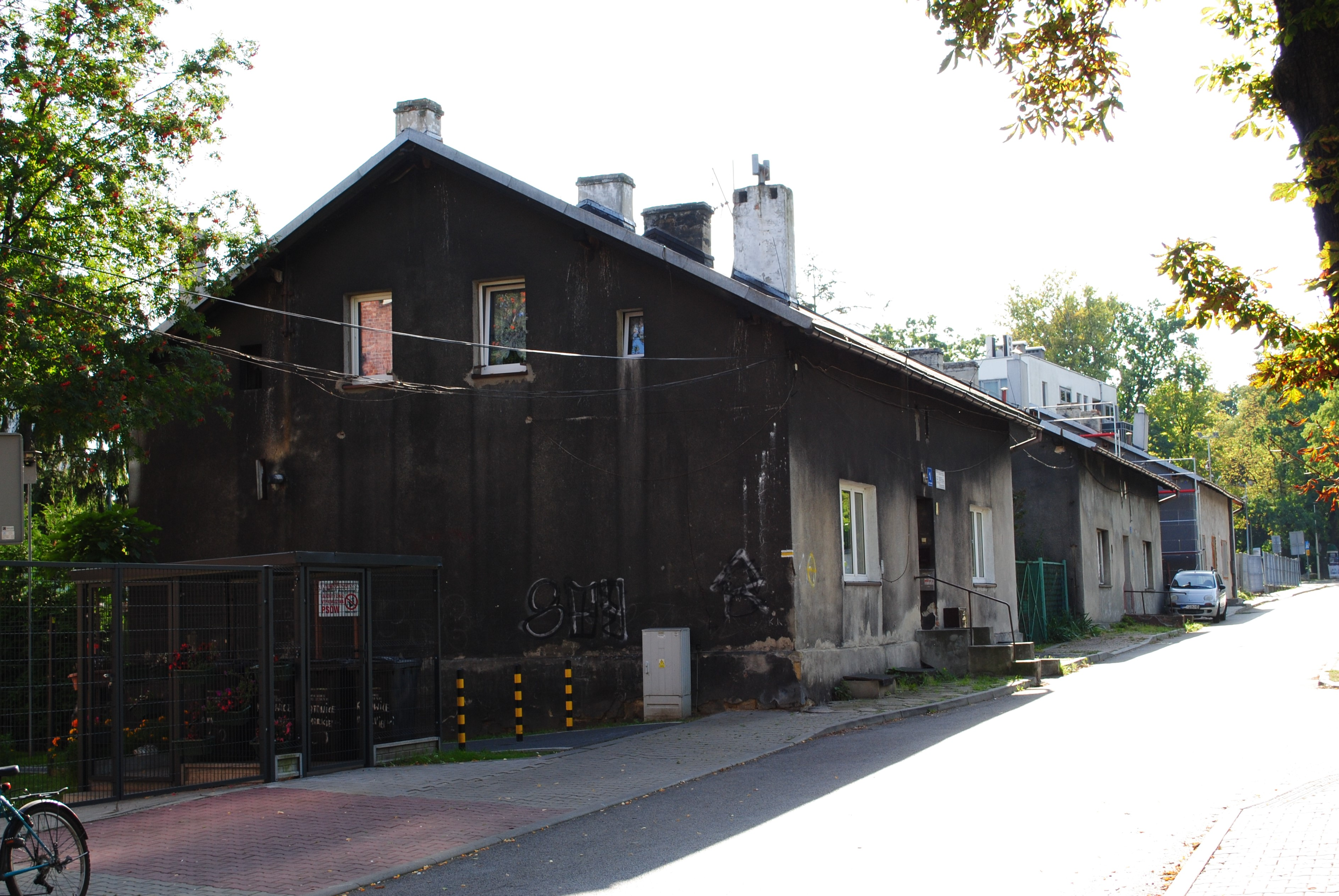
Houses at Sztygarska Street – the first workers' colony of the Ferdinand (Katowice) Coal Mine

Bogucice's urban development intensified with the growth of industry and the increase in the number of inhabitants of the settlement. In the second half of the 19th century, Bogucice developed as an industrial settlement in the area of Kopalniana, L. Markiefka, and Katowicka streets. In 1867, there were 114 houses, farm buildings, and a water mill there. At the corner of present-day L. Markiefka and Ryszarda streets, a lodging house for workers from the Ferdinand (Katowice) Coal Mine was built during the same period. Currently, it functions as a residential building, though in the 1970s and 1980s, it was designated for demolition.

An 1880s map of Bogucice marks a group of houses on what is now Sztygarska Street – the first workers' colony of the Ferdinand (Katowice) Coal Mine. Three houses from the colony on the south side of the street have survived to this day. The Convent of Brothers Hospitallers was built between 1872 and 1874 at 85 and 87 L. Markiefka Street, followed by a new hospital pavilion between 1903 and 1904. The complex has historicist features with elements of Gothic Revival and Romanesque Revival styles.

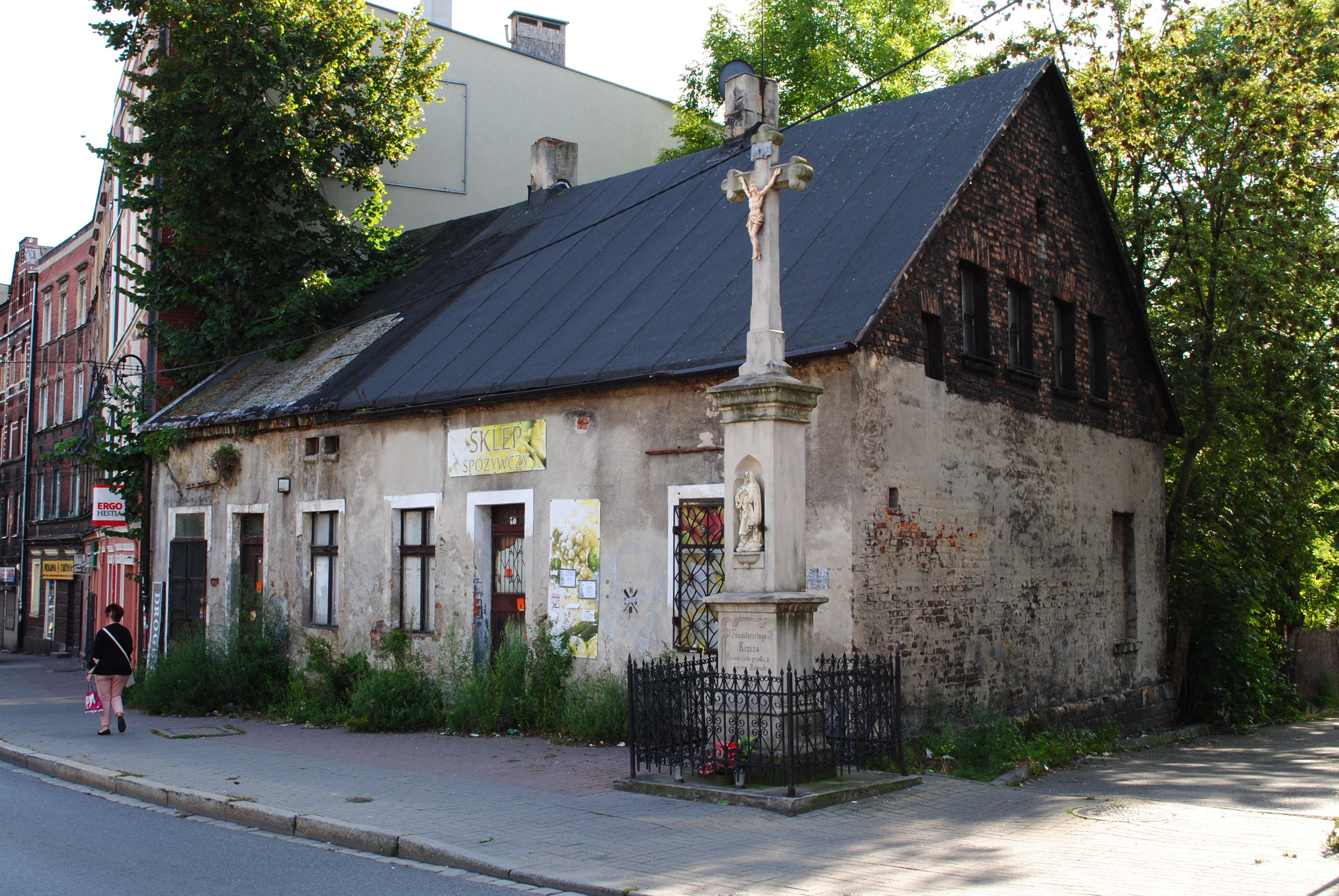
Blacksmith's House at 76 L. Markiefka Street, before the fire (2020)

Among Bogucice's oldest documented buildings was the Blacksmith's House, located at the corner of L. Markiefka and Kowalska streets. It appears on maps published in the 1880s. The house belonged to blacksmith Johann Cziosska, and his smithy was in the courtyard. In 1930, the house was bought by chemist Stanisław Lewandowski, who planned to build a multi-story tenement in its place. On 13 June 2022, a fire broke out in the building, burning down its roof. It was demolished in early February 2025.

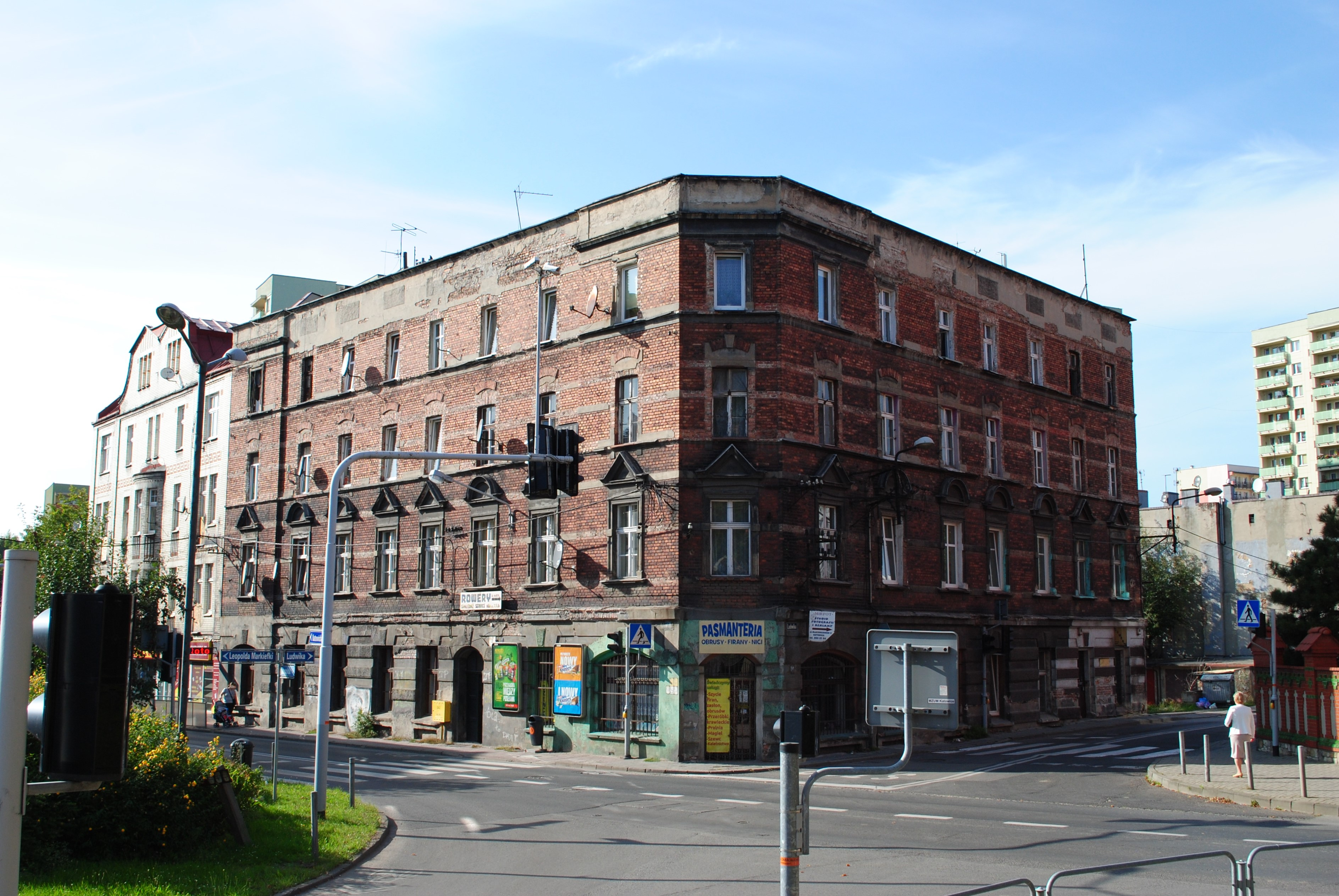
Tenements at the corner of Katowicka and Ludwika streets, dating from the turn of the 20th century

In the 1890s, many large, partly three-story workers' houses were built in Bogucice, while impressive tenements were erected alongside rural buildings along L. Markiefka Street, the traces of which are still visible in the urban structure of the district. Buildings from the end of the 19th century are concentrated in the area of L. Markiefka (mainly the northern and central part of the road), Górna (all the buildings on the street; from around 1895), Katowicka (some of the buildings on the eastern side of the road), and B. Żogała streets, as well as individual structures, including part of the buildings next to the Katowice mine on Nadgórników Street and the buildings at 48 and 48a Ludwika Street (from 1896), 3, 7, and 33 W. Wróblewski Street, and 6 Normy Street.

St. Stephen's Church was built between 1892 and 1894 according to a design by Paul Jackisch. It is a three-nave temple with a three-sided choir and a single tower at the entrance façade. It refers to the work of Carl Lüdecke and Constantinus Heidenreich, known, among other things, for their consultation on the Church of the Beheading of St. John the Baptist in Ruda Śląska. The new brick church was built on the site of the previous wooden one, demolished in 1891.

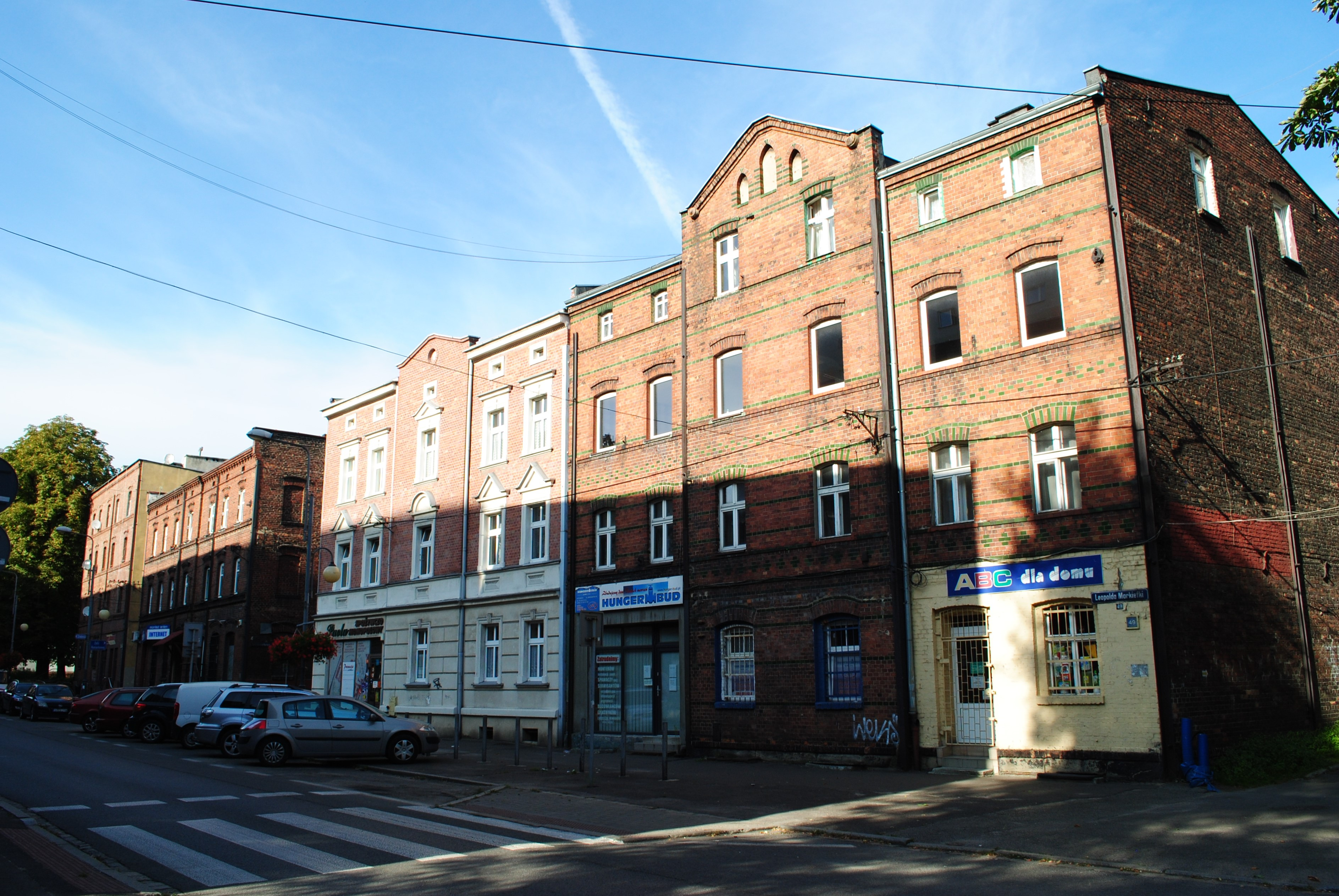
Buildings along L. Markiefka Street, dating from the turn of the 20th century

The existing buildings from between 1900 and 1922 are concentrated in the central part of Bogucice, in the area of L. Markiefka, Nowa, W. Wróblewski, Ryszarda, Kowalska, Kopalniana, and I. Kraszewski streets, while individual structures are also located in other parts of the district, including 5 Ludwika Street. Between 1900 and 1903, two buildings were constructed on Nowa Street for workers from the Ferdinand (Katowice) Coal Mine, and between 1908 and 1910, four houses for miners were built on Nadgórników Street, which still stand today.

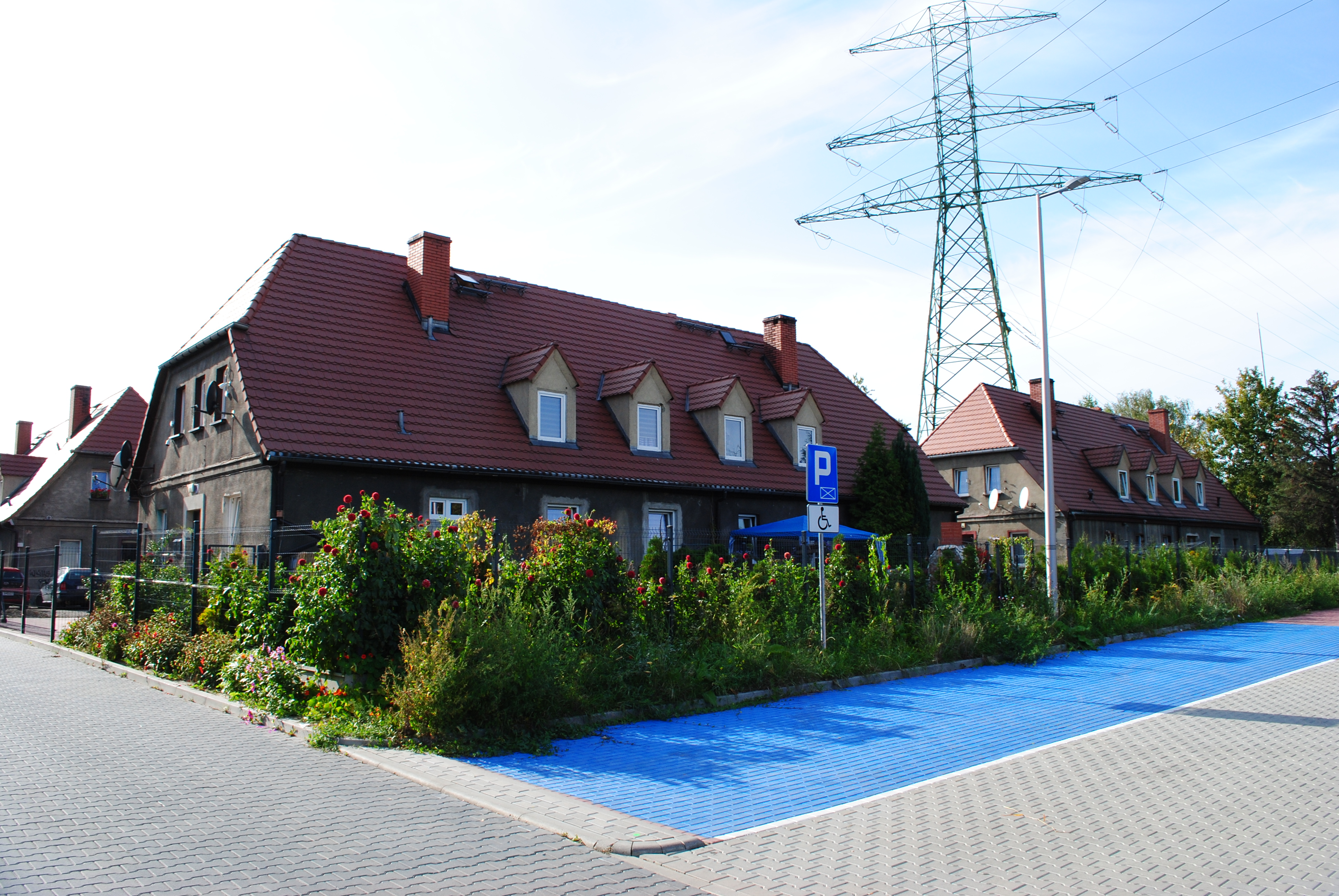
Colony of residential houses of the former Ferdinand Coal Mine at Leopolda Street, built during World War II

On the border between today's Bogucice and Koszutka, in the area of present-day Katowicka, Klonowa, Topolowa, Wierzbowa, and Brzozowa streets, a workers' housing estate was built in the early 1930s, consisting of 20 apartment blocks and a public school (now the premises of Stanisław Maczek High School in Koszutka). The 1936 building at 50 L. Markiefka Street also dates back to the interwar period. During World War II and the German occupation of Bogucice, the then owner of the Ferdinand mine built a small colony of residential houses, which still exists today, on what is now Leopolda Street.

Shortly after World War II, a housing estate consisting of 250 wooden Finnish houses was built in Bogucice in 1948. It was constructed outside the compact development of the district, partly on wasteland. The last houses were demolished at the end of the 1980s, and Osiedle Kukuczki was built in their place. Osiedle Kukuczki itself was designed by Adam Śleziak and Andrzej Trybuś. Osiedle W. Wajdy was built in the 1970s and 1980s.

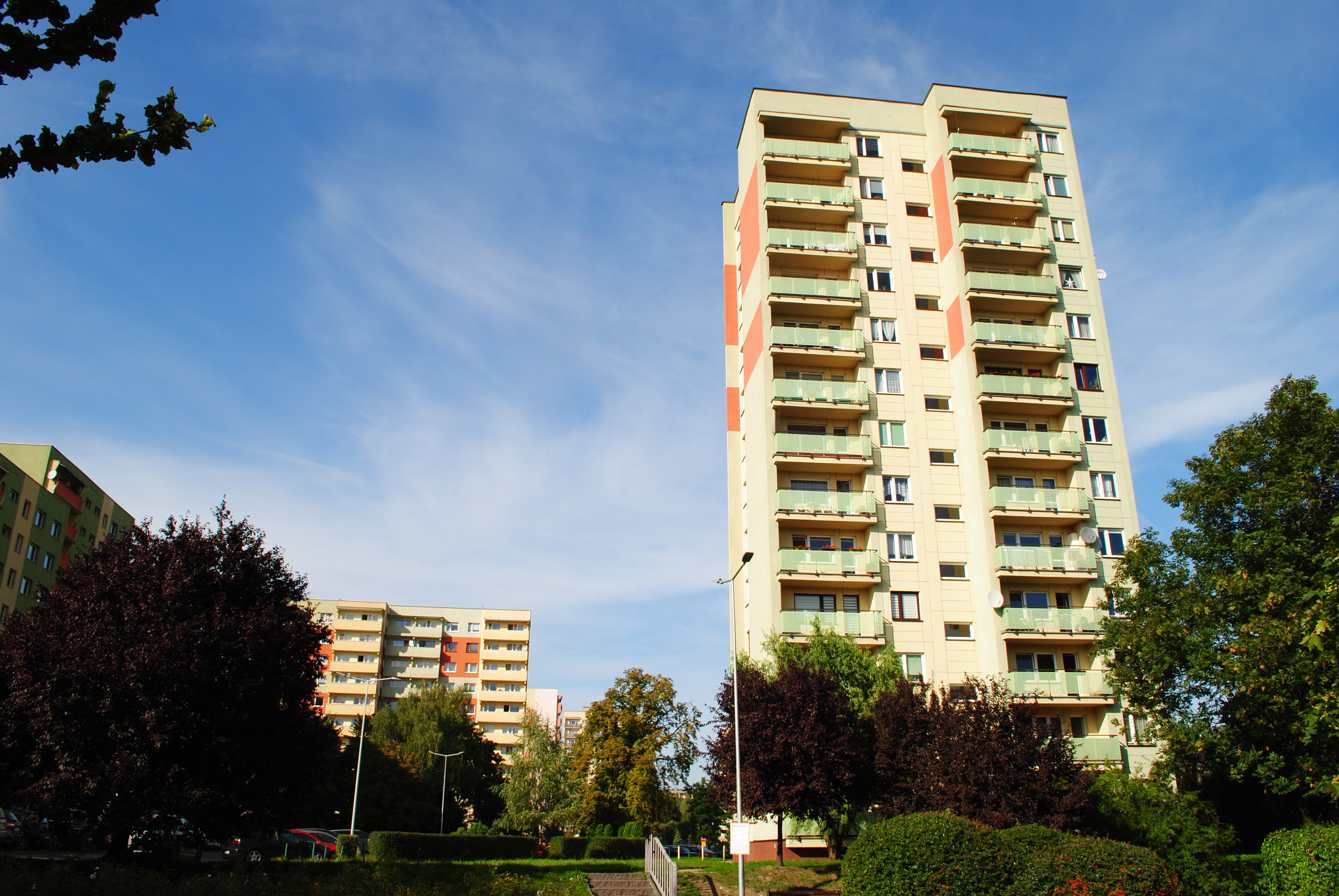
Part of Osiedle W. Wajdy, built in the 1970s and 1980s

Due to the reconstruction of the railway network, significant changes have been made to the urban structure of the district since the 1950s. Ryszarda Street, which once led to Zawodzie, was cut off. The western section of Kopalniana Street was also demolished, along with a large part of the buildings standing next to it. A section of structures at the intersection of Ryszarda and L. Markiefka streets was also demolished, including the former Bogucice fire station. The new layout of the railway tracks, together with the extension of W. Roździeński Avenue, separated Bogucice from Zawodzie and Śródmieście, which had to be reached via Koszutka at the time.

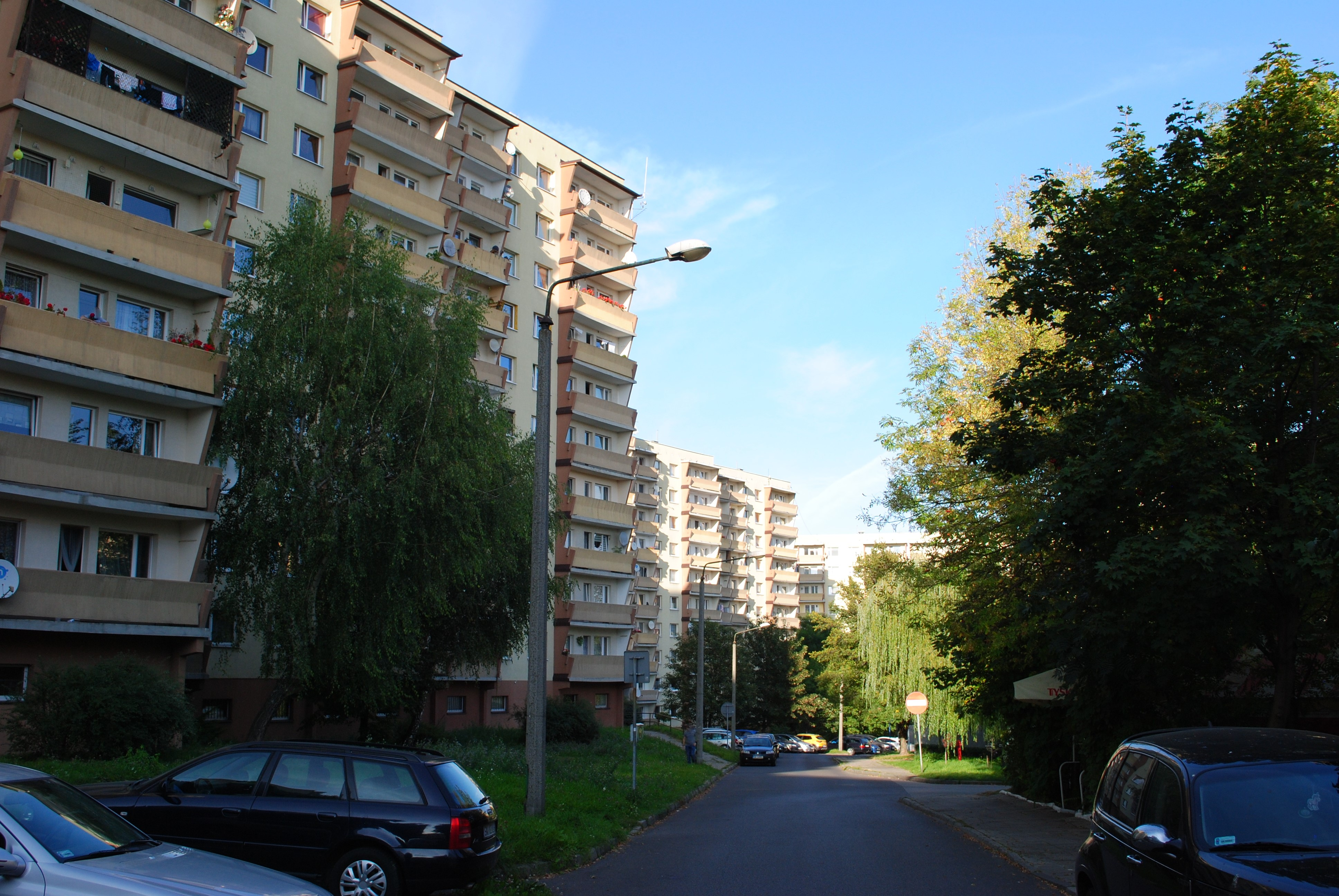
Part of Osiedle Kukuczki

In 1982, the Mining Housing Cooperative was established at the Katowice Coal Mine, which between 1984 and 1987 completed 73 apartments at 77 L. Markiefki and 1–7b Modrzewiowa streets. Between 1982 and 1985, the First Congregation of the Baptist Church was built on Morawska Street. It was constructed according to a design by a team of engineers, with Adam Śleziak as the main designer. In total, new buildings from Polish People's Republic period were constructed in the vicinity of the historic center of Bogucice, on its western, northern, and eastern sides.

The buildings in Bogucice constructed after 1989 are located in various parts of the district. In the northern part, Osiedle Na Alpach was built between 1990 and 1995, while between 2002 and 2007, buildings were constructed along Zakopiańska Street.

Between 2010 and 2015, the area of the former Katowice mine was revitalized, and the Culture Zone was created there. The headquarters of the Polish National Radio Symphony Orchestra and the new premises of the Silesian Museum were constructed within the boundaries of Bogucice. For the needs of the Culture Zone, a new road layout was also implemented, connecting it with W. Roździeński Avenue and J. Duda-Gracz and Nadgórników street.

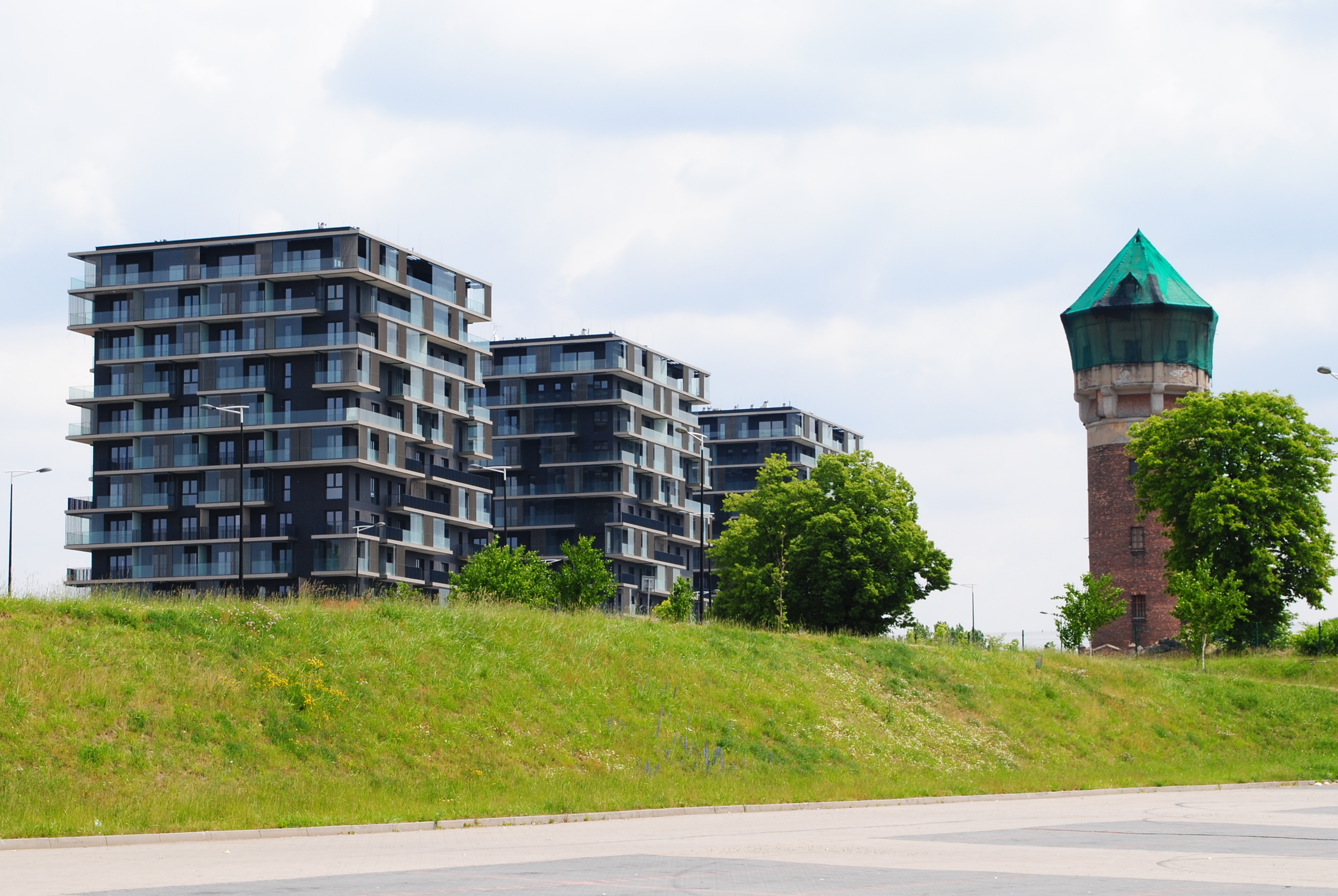
Osiedle Pierwsza Dzielnica in mid-June 2021

The National Radio Symphony Orchestra building, located at 1 W. Kilar Square, was constructed between 2011 and 2014. The 28-meter-high building has five above-ground floors and one underground floor. Inside, there are two halls: a chamber hall for about 300 people and a large hall for 1,800 people, surrounded by an atrium with auxiliary rooms. The building's façade is covered with glass and clinker brick.

The winding engine house, the machine room with its steam winding engine, and the headframe building with the winding tower of the former Katowice mine were entered in the Registry of Cultural Property in 1998. Today, the buildings of the former mine are an example of historic industrial architecture, which the authorities intend to use to enrich the urban fabric of the center of Katowice. They have been converted into the new headquarters of the Silesian Museum. Most of the new museum buildings were constructed underground. The above-ground structures include the central hall, the administration building, skylights, and an observation tower. These facilities are one of the landmarks of Katowice.

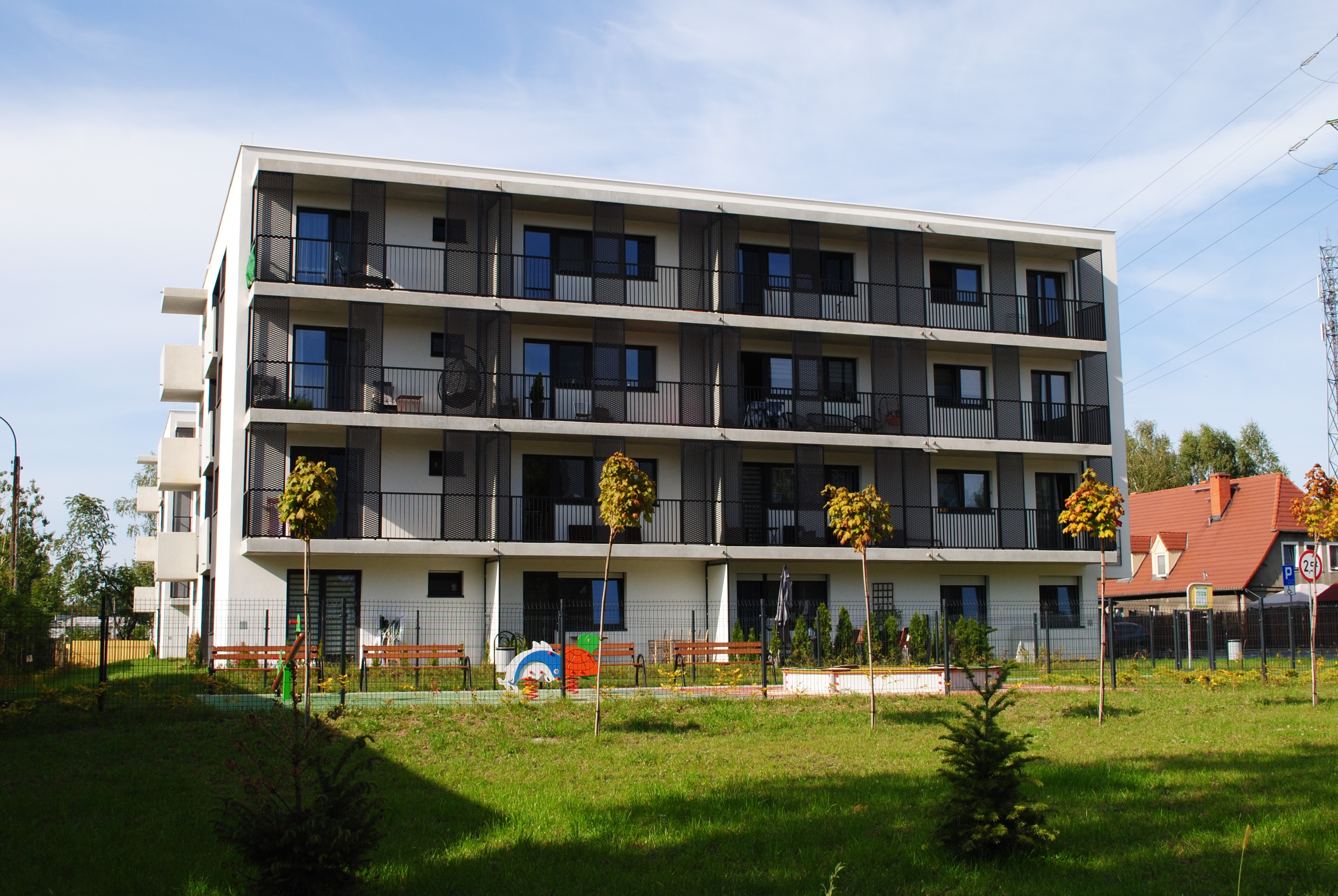
Residential building at 17 and 17a Leopolda Street, constructed in 2020

At the beginning of May 2019, construction began on Osiedle Pierwsza Dzielnica on a plot located north of the Silesian Museum. The first stage involved the construction of three 42-meter-high buildings with a total of 265 apartments. There are 13 commercial premises on the ground floor, and underground parking for 292 cars was built under the buildings. The investor behind the housing estate was TDJ Estate.

In June 2020, a residential building at 17 and 17a Leopolda Street was completed, commissioned by Katowice TBS. The four-story U-shaped building has 51 apartments, and next to it there is a small playground, a parking lot with 27 parking spaces, and a city bike station.

Today, residential development in Bogucice is mainly concentrated along L. Markiefka and Katowicka streets. The areas around Podhalańska, W. Wróblewski, and Wrocławska streets are dominated by buildings constructed in the 1970s and 1980s – Osiedle Kukuczki and Osiedle W. Wajdy – while the area around Osikowa, Cedrowa, and Brzozowa streets is dominated by single-family housing.

=== Housing estates ===
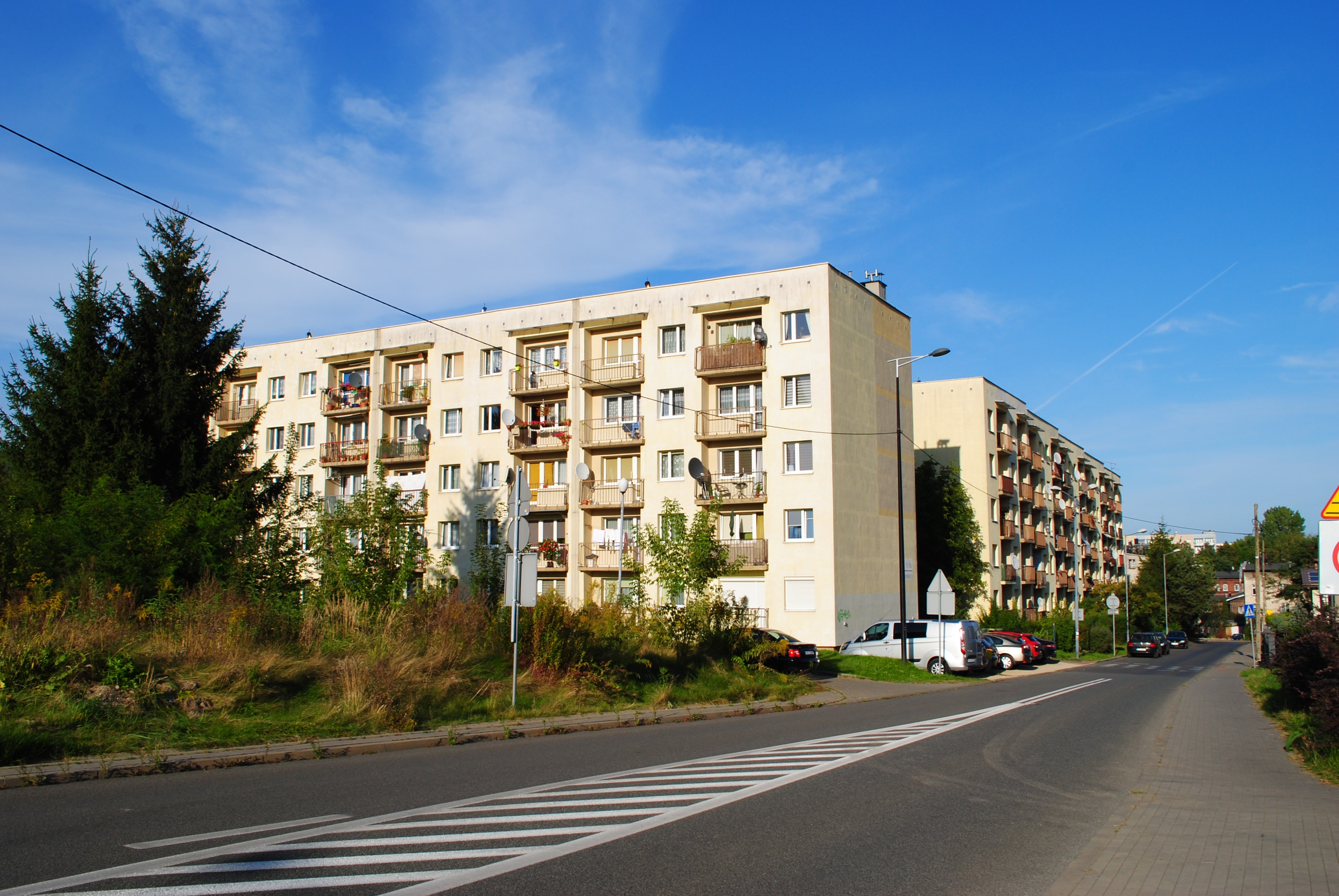
Section of Osiedle Ścigały – buildings at Nadgórników Street

The following housing estates are located within the current boundaries of Bogucice:

- Osiedle Kukuczki – a housing estate in the north-eastern part of Bogucice, built on the site of a former Finnish housing estate. It consists of buildings ranging from 4 to 11 stories high. The estate was designed by Adam Śleziak and Andrzej Trybuś;
- Osiedle Ścigały – a housing estate from the mid-1970s, built by the Katowice Housing Cooperative on the site of allotment gardens and partly on the site of the old buildings of Bogucice. Most of it was inhabited by families of workers from the Katowice mine;
- Osiedle Wajdy – a housing estate built in the first half of the 1980s, consisting of four clusters of multi-family prefabricated concrete blocks, located in the area of K. Hoppe Street. In addition to residential buildings, the estate also includes two service pavilions and playgrounds;
- Osiedle Na Alpach – a housing estate managed by the Na Alpach Housing Cooperative, based at 9 F. Blachnicki Street;
- Osiedle Pierwsza Dzielnica – a housing estate in the area of H. M. Górecki and T. Dobrowolski streets, designed by the Bytom-based Medusa Group studio. It comprises nine residential towers surrounded by park areas. The developer was TDJ Estate.

=== Historical buildings ===
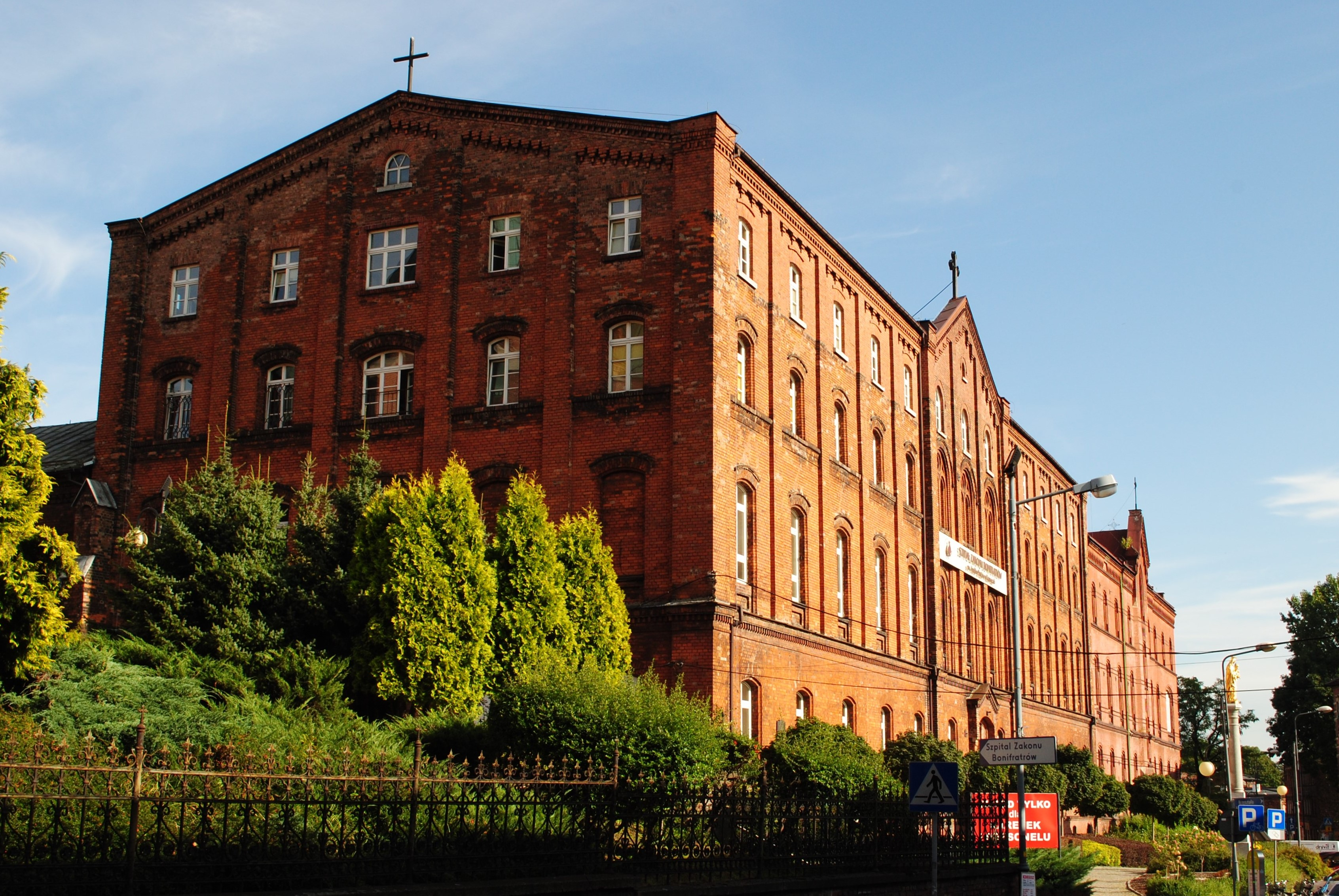
Building of the Brothers Hospitallers' Convent complex and the Hospital of Brothers Hospitallers of Saint John of God (85–87 L. Markiefka Street)

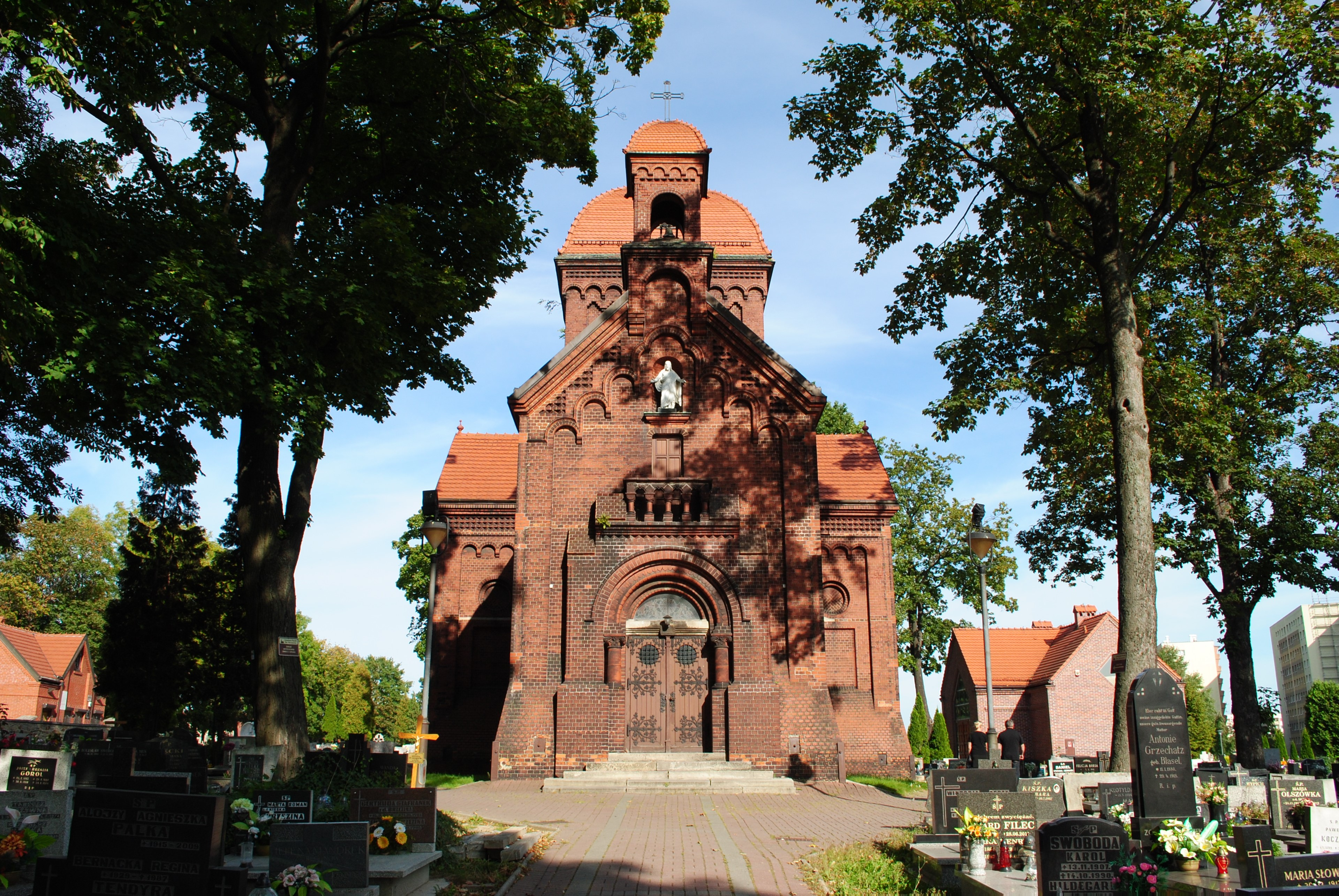
Chapel of the Sacred Heart of Jesus at the parish cemetery at W. Wróblewski Street

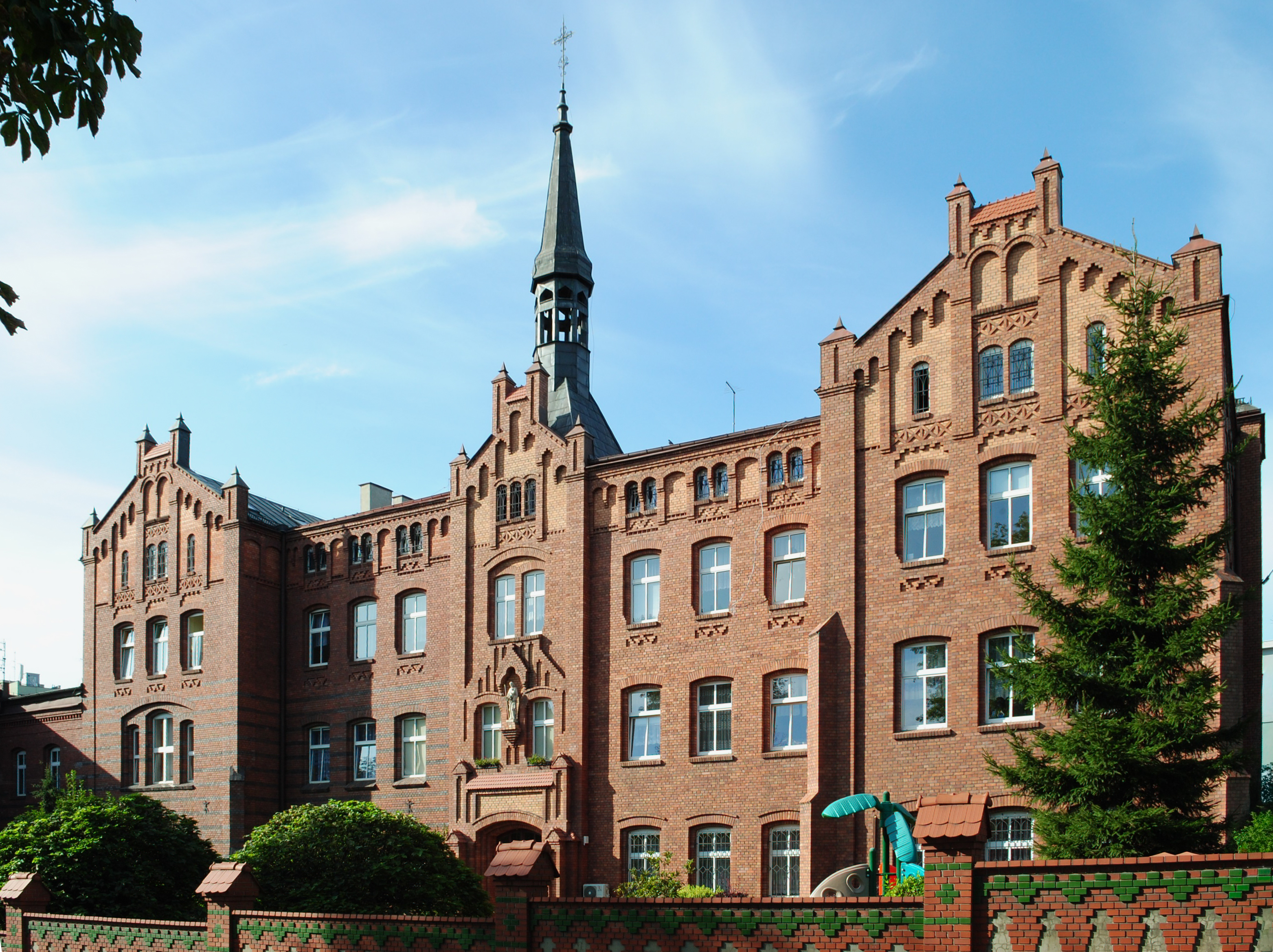
Children's Home complex and the Convent of the Sisters of St. Hedwig (1–3 Leopolda Street; eastern part of the complex)

The following historical buildings are located in Bogucice:

- Brothers Hospitallers' Convent complex and the Hospital of Brothers Hospitallers of Saint John of God (85–87 L. Markiefka Street) – the convent complex was built between 1872 and 1874, and the hospital between 1902 and 1903 (or between 1903 and 1904). The buildings were constructed in the historicist style with Romanesque Revival and Gothic Revival elements, and were entered in the Registry of Cultural Property on 1 July 1992 (reg. no.: A/1367/88; currently A/1367/24);
- St. Stephen's Church (89 L. Markiefka Street) – basilica entered in the Registry of Cultural Property on 26 May 1988 (reg. no.: A/1365/88). It was built between 1892 and 1894 according to a design by Paul Jackisch, and completed by Müller. The Gothic Revival church stands on the site of an earlier one from 1854, which was itself preceded by other wooden churches;
- Group of six statues in front of St. Stephen's Church – they depict the following figures: Paul the Apostle, St. Peter, St. Stephen, St. Joseph with the Christ Child, the Blessed Virgin Mary, and St. Barbara. They were entered in the Registry of Cultural Property on 21 August 1992 (reg. no.: B/630/928);
- Buildings at 29, 43, 45, and 47 L. Markiefka Street – buildings under conservation protection, erected at the beginning of the 20th century in the brick historicist style (so-called familoks);
- Stone cross at the corner of 76 L. Markiefka and Kowalska streets – the pedestal bears a crucifix, and a statue of a saint is placed in a niche in the tall two-part pedestal. There is also an inscription plaque (Fundatorzitego/Krziża/Posiedziciele gruntu z/gminy Bogucki/1887), while the cross has a wrought-iron fence. It was renovated in 2005;
- Children's Home complex and the Convent of the Sisters of St. Hedwig – Provincial House (1–3 Leopolda Street) – entered in the Registry of Cultural Property on 26 May 1988 (reg. no.: A/1368/88; currently A/1368/24). It was built between 1858 and 1931, representing the historicist style with Romanesque Revival and Renaissance Revival elements, as well as modern style with Expressionist elements;
- Cemetery complex (between Leopolda, W. Wróblewski, and Podhalańska streets) – dates back to the late 18th century, with its current layout from the turn of the 19th and 20th centuries. It serves as both a parish cemetery and a Brothers Hospitallers' cemetery. It was entered in the Registry of Cultural Property on 4 September 1992 (reg. no.: A/1496/92). The complex consists of: the spatial layout of the cemetery, cemetery buildings and small architecture, a fence with gates, old trees, and a group of historic gravestones. It is the oldest necropolis in Katowice, mentioned in 1598;
- Chapel of the Sacred Heart of Jesus – dates back to 1910. It is located in the Bogucice parish cemetery, built on the site of a Chapel of Our Lady of Sorrows according to a design by Mansuetus Fromm;
- Tenements, pigsties, gazebos, and familoks on Katowicka, L. Markiefka, Ryszarda, and W. Wróblewski streets from the 19th century, representing examples of old Silesian architecture.

=== Monuments and commemorative plaques ===
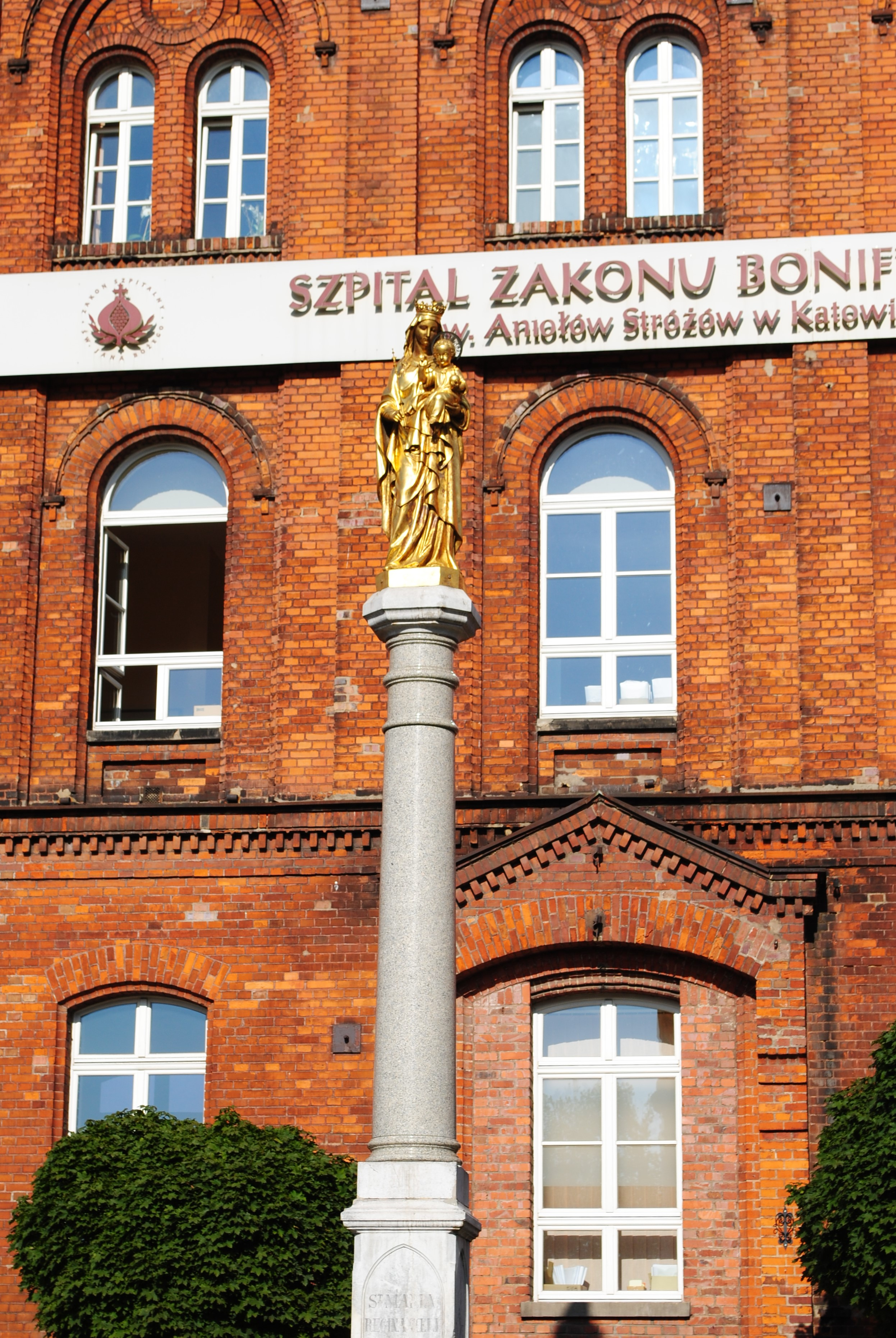
Marian column with a gilded statue of the Virgin Mary with Child (L. Markiefka Street)

- Statue of St. Barbara (Kopalniana Street) – a stone statue on a brick pedestal commemorating the mining disaster of 16 September 1933 at the Katowice Coal Mine;
- Marian column with a gilded statue of the Virgin Mary with Child (L. Markiefka Street; in front of Brothers Hospitallers' hospital) – consecrated on 16 June 1881 by Father Leopold Markiefka;
- Roadside crosses – at the intersection with Leopolda Street and in the area of the intersection of L. Markiefka and Kowalska streets;
- Monument to the Silesian Insurgents (W. Wajda Square) – erected in place of the pre-war one;
- Plaque commemorating the consecration of the Bogucice basilica (St. Stephen's Church; at the entrance) – placed in 2014 on the 120th anniversary of the event;
- Plaque commemorating the Ferdinand (Katowice) Coal Mine and its workers (on the support of the Warszawa II shaft of the former mine) – unveiled on 20 October 2014 on the initiative of the Brotherhood of Mine Shareholders of the Upper Silesian Union;
- Plaque commemorating the Katowice Coal Mine between 1823 and 2000 (St. Stephen's Church; in the church porch on the left);
- Plaque commemorating Jerzy Kukuczka (94 L. Markiefka Street) – located at the birthplace of the mountaineer;
- Plaque commemorating Father Ludwik Skowronek (St. Stephen's Church; in the church porch on the left) – the plaque bears his image and information that Father Skowronek was the builder of the church and author of Via ad coelum (The Road to Heaven);
- Plaque commemorating Father Franciszek Ścigała (St. Stephen's Church; in the church porch on the left);
- Plaque commemorating Father Alfons Tomaszewski (St. Stephen's Church; in the church porch on the right) – unveiled in 1987;
- Plaques commemorating the 400th anniversary of the presence of Brothers Hospitallers in Poland and 150 years of service by monks in Bogucice (Convent and Hospital of Brothers Hospitallers, at the entrance to the chapel and monastery) – unveiled on 6 September 2024, consecrated by Archbishop Adrian Galbas.

=== Zoning ===
In terms of actual land use in January 2008, the largest share was held by areas located in the urban unit of Bogucice (area: 203.19 ha), including multi-family residential areas (42.67 ha), vacant building land (31.04 ha) and landscaped green spaces (46.48 ha). A significant share is also held by service (15.77 ha), production and service (10.84 ha), and transport areas (28.58 ha), as well as wasteland (17.44 ha). There are no agricultural areas or forests there, while the share of water areas is 1.08 ha.

The share of built-up area in Bogucice in 2007 was 28%, slightly higher than the average for the entire city (23%). In some quarters of the district, it exceeds 50%. The net floor area ratio for Bogucice at that time reached 0.61 and was also higher than the index for Katowice – 0.49, while the average number of storeys fluctuates at 2.19.

As of July 2009, 18.78% (38.15 ha) of the Bogucice urban unit was covered by zoning in force at that time.

== Education ==
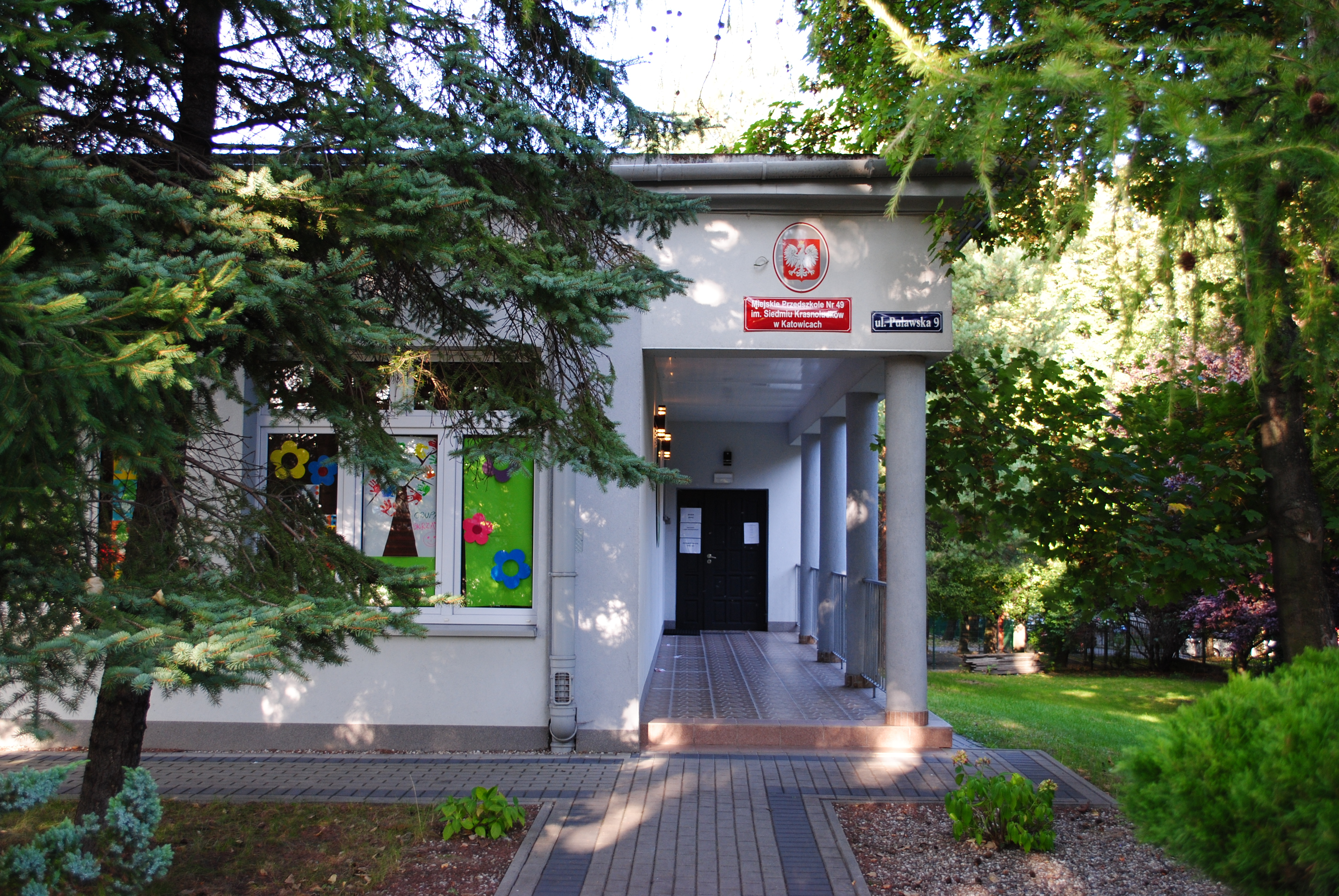
Building of Seven Dwarfs Municipal Kindergarten No. 49 (9 Puławska Street)

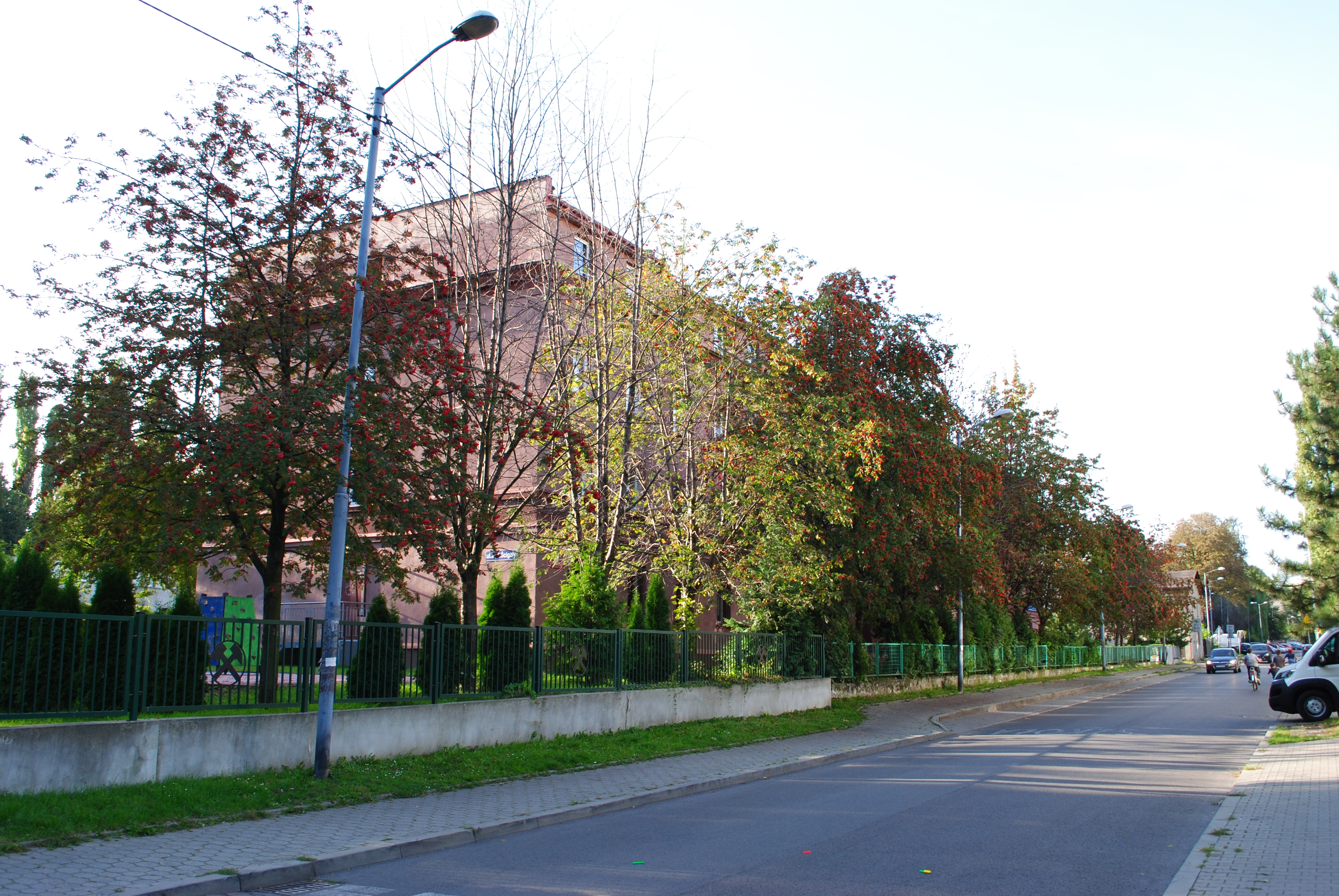
Building of St. Hyacinth Catholic Primary School (17 F. Ścigała Street)

In 2012, there were 7 kindergartens, two school and kindergarten complexes, a primary school, a special school complex, two lower secondary schools, a high school, and the Faculty of Social and Pedagogical Sciences of the J. Korczak Higher Pedagogical School and the Higher School of Labour Protection Management operating in Bogucice and its immediate vicinity. As of June 2022, the following educational institutions were operating in Bogucice:

1. Nurseries and kindergartens:
  - Municipal Kindergarten No. 22 (4d Kopalniana Street),
  - Seven Dwarfs Municipal Kindergarten No. 49 (9 Puławska Street),
  - Municipal Kindergarten No. 97 (9 Wiślana Street),
  - Przytulny Kącik Kindergarten and Nursery (4a Kujawska Street),
  - Public Kindergarten of the Roman Catholic Parish of St. Stephen (89 L. Markiefka Street),
  - Kindergarten in Osiedle Pierwsza Dzielnica (11 H. M. Górecki Street),
2. Primary schools:
  - St. Hyacinth Catholic Primary School (17 F. Ścigała Street),
  - Korczak School of Dreams (27 Katowicka Street),
  - John Paul II Special Primary School No. 39 (17 F. Ścigała Street),
  - Jerzy Kukuczka Primary School No. 40 (1 Słowiańska Street);
3. School complexes:
  - School and Nursery Complex No. 4 (42–44 W. Wróblewski Street), comprising:
    - Municipal Kindergarten No. 70,
    - St. Barbara Primary School No. 13;
4. Higher education institutions:
  - Korczak University, Faculty of Social and Pedagogical Sciences (27 Katowicka Street).

The beginnings of education in Bogucice, as well as in the entire present-day Katowice, date back to the 15th or 16th century. The rural school in Bogucice, most likely located on land belonging to the local farmer Ostrowski, by the main road, dates back to this period. It functioned as a parish institution attached to the local church. The Bogucice school was first mentioned in 1619. Parishioners were required to pay a special fee – clericatura – and peasants had to bring the teacher a cartload of firewood every year. In 1775, after the education reform in Prussia, a secular teacher appeared in the school. Visitation reports and church documents from 1793 show that the school operated on a single-class system at that time and was attended by 72 students, including 36 from Bogucice, 16 from Katowice, 15 from Załęże, and 5 from Dąbrówka Mała. The oldest school building was made of wood and had a thatched roof. Before the beginning of the 19th century, it was the only school in what is now Katowice.

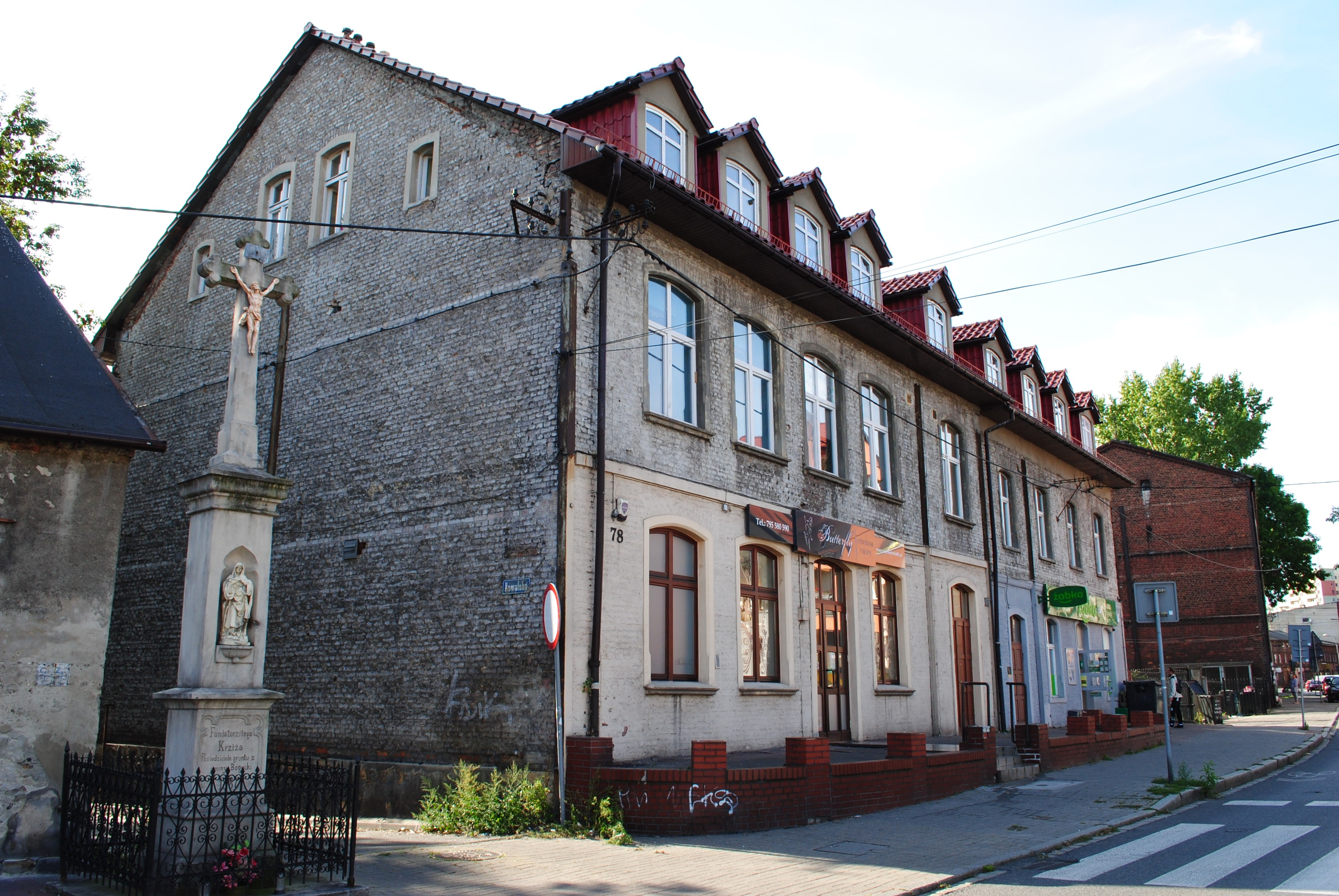
Building of the old school at 78 L. Markiefka Street

From 1804, a Polish Catholic school operated in Bogucice, which children attended twice a week. Plans to build a new brick school in the area of today's intersection of L. Markiefka and Katowicka streets date back to 1818, though the new building was finally opened in 1823, and 86 children began their education. In 1859, the Catholic school was extended with an additional floor. At that time, 527 children from Bogucice and Zawodzie were subject to compulsory education, while 350 children attended the school. In 1875, a new building was opened at 78 L. Markiefka Street. Between 1945 and 1953, it functioned as a boarding school, and in the following years, it changed its purpose many times.

The co-educational Municipal School No. 12 was opened at 40–44 W. Wróblewski Street in 1902 (or 1903). It had 12 classrooms, a study, a staff room, and two rooms for teaching aids. From 1913, the school was intended exclusively for boys, while a girls' school, No. 13, was established separately. The new school for girls was completed in April of the same year. It was built according to a design by the municipal building authority, and it had 10 classrooms, a home economics school, a study, a staff room, a room for teaching aids, and a janitor's apartment. On 30 June 1922, the German school was closed, and after Poland took over part of Upper Silesia, a Polish school was established in its place on 1 September 1922. At that time, 846 children attended the school, and later the number of students decreased to 724 in 7 Polish and 4 German classes. During World War II, the Bogucice school was transformed into a German school, and all traces of Polish identity were burned on the school playground.

The school was taken over from the Germans on 13 February 1945. It was structurally intact, but the interior had been devastated. Classes resumed on 5 April or 5 May 1945. On 29 April 1967, a gym was opened, connecting Primary School No. 12 and Primary School No. 13. On 3 September 1973, Primary School No. 13 was named after Walery Wróblewski, a participant in the January Uprising. In the 1975/1976 school year, schools No. 12 and 13 were merged to form a single institution, Primary School No. 13. In the 1980s, the number of students at the school increased rapidly. Some of the lower classes were moved to the building of the former school on L. Markiefka Street, and the school itself operated in three shifts at that time. On 14 February 2006, Primary School No. 13 in Bogucice was given back its pre-war patron's name – St. Barbara. On 1 September 2009, St. Barbara Primary School No. 13 and Municipal Kindergarten No. 17 were merged into School and Kindergarten Complex No. 4. In 2013, Primary School No. 13 celebrated its centenary, and in 2017, the red brick building was renovated.

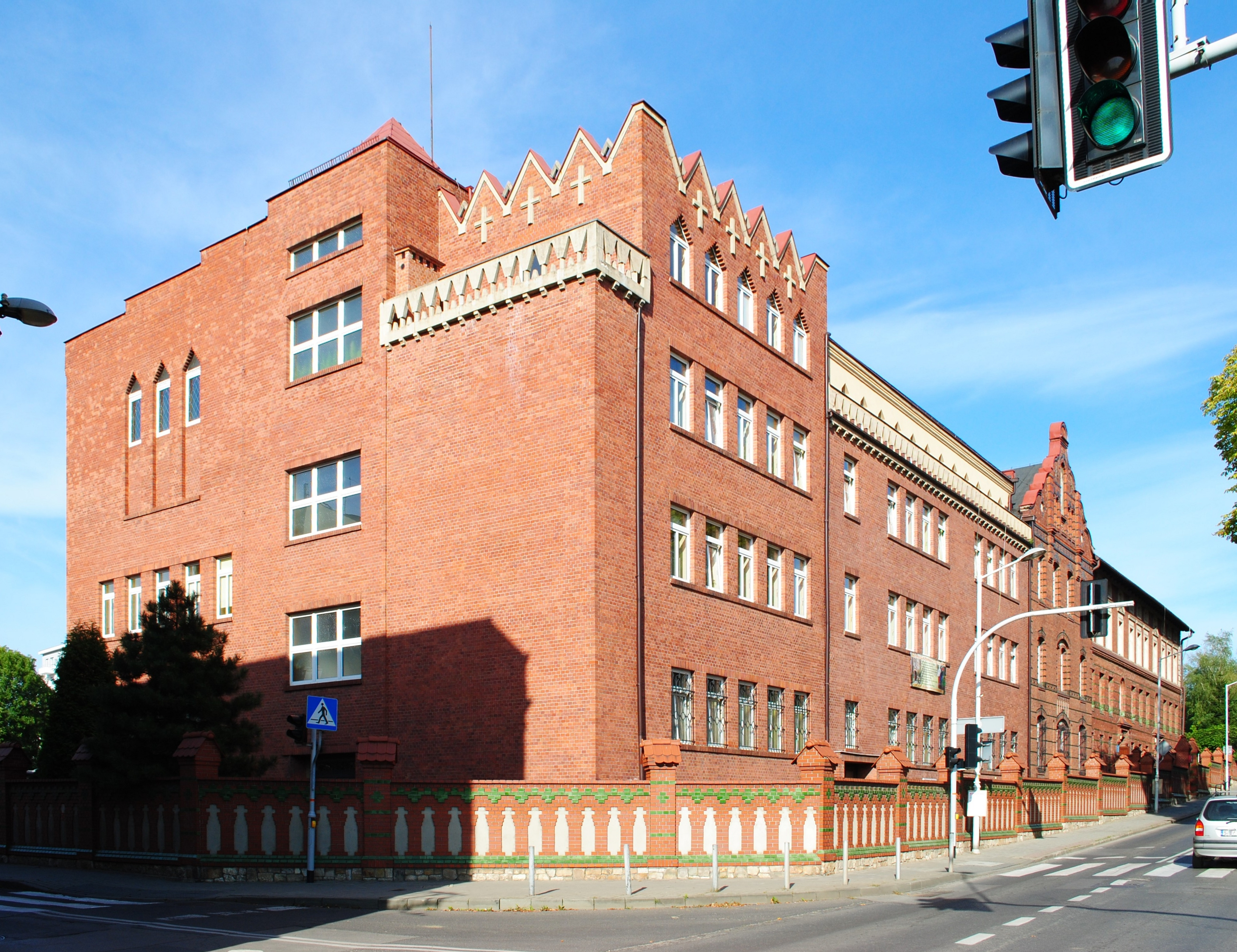
Children's Home complex and the Convent of the Sisters of St. Hedwig (1–3 Leopolda Street)

In 1856, the Bogucice parish priest, Father Leopold Markiefka, purchased approximately 8 acres of land near the church from his sister Józefina. Originally, he decided to build a shelter for the elderly and disabled there, but ultimately decided on an orphanage. The two-story building, which is now the central part of the complex at 1 Leopolda Street, was built between 1857 and 1858. It was opened on 26 March 1858, and three Sisters of Mercy of St. Charles Borromeo from the mother house in Nysa took care of the orphans. In 1859, the sisters were allowed to open a boarding house and a girls' school, the income from which was used to support the orphans. In 1861, the building was expanded and the number of sisters serving there increased to 11. An elementary school operated there, attended by 51 orphans and 93 children from the surrounding area. During the Kulturkampf, the authorities forced the sisters to leave the orphanage on 1 April 1879, and a lay person took over the care of the facility. After the regulations were relaxed, the orphanage was taken over by the Sisters of St. Hedwig on 21 December 1886. Between 1886 and 1887, the west wing of the orphanage was built and the central part was expanded.

The orphanage also ran a three-class school for its pupils, a kindergarten, and a school of handicrafts and music. During World War II, the Sisters of St. Hedwig were expelled on 13 October 1941. They returned in January 1945 and on 28 February of the same year, they reopened the Father L. Markiefka Children's Home, and later also the kindergarten. In 1955, the sisters were ordered to close it. In 1961, the existing pupils were transferred to other institutions, and children with mild disabilities were placed in Bogucice. From then on, the facility functioned as an Educational Institution run by the pro-government Caritas Catholic Association, and the buildings were taken over by the state. A Special Primary School was also established.

In 1949, construction began on a mining school, which was opened on 1 September 1952. Students began their education at the new school in four classes, and each year, approximately 80 graduates joined the ranks of employees at the Katowice Coal Mine. The building was equipped with workshops, a gym, and a dormitory for 250 students. The school ceased to educate for the needs of mining at the end of the 20th century, and it was converted into a complex of general education schools, and later into St. Hyacinth Catholic Primary School. St. Hyacinth Catholic Primary School was founded in 1992 by the Association of Catholic Families of the Archdiocese of Katowice. It was established as a priivate institution with the rights of a public school. In September 1999, a Catholic Secondary School began operating there, which, together with the Catholic Primary School, formed the Catholic General Education School Complex No. 2 until 31 August 2017. The following day, the Catholic Primary School was named after St. Hyacinth and, in connection with the education reform, became an eight-year primary school.

On 2 September 1991, Primary School No. 40 was opened in Osiedle Kukuczki. In its first year of operation, it had 447 students. At that time, construction work was still ongoing. In the 1992/1993 school year, a teaching building for older classes and a connecting corridor were completed. By the 1993/1994 school year, it was already an eight-grade school. In the 1996/1997 school year, the last rooms of the school were put into use – a sports hall with a storage room for equipment. On 24 March 1998, a ceremony was held to name the patron of Primary School No. 40 – Jerzy Kukuczka. Due to the education reform, Secondary School No. 10 was established in the building of Primary School No. 40 on 1 September 1999, and the last students of the six-grade primary school left the facility in June 2004. On 1 September 2017, in connection with the education reform, J. Kukuczka Secondary School No. 10 was transformed into Primary School No. 40.

== Public and social safety ==
Bogucice is covered by Police Station II of the Katowice Municipal Police Headquarters, located at 2 K. Iłłakowiczówna Street. In terms of crime rate, the district was one of the safer districts in 2007. At that time, 1.86 criminal acts per 100 inhabitants were recorded (the average for the whole of Katowice was 3.08), and this number has decreased since 2004 from 3.73 crimes per 100 inhabitants. In 2013, there were 292 crimes in Bogucice, which translates into 20 crimes per 1,000 residents of the district – lower than for Katowice as a whole, which reached 28 crimes per 1,000 residents during this period. During that time, there were 10 robberies, 14 acts of hooliganism, and 11 acts of domestic violence in Bogucice. According to a survey conducted in 2011, 52.0% of respondents from Bogucice indicated that they felt safe in their district, 38.3% were of the opposite view, and 6.7% had no clear opinion on the matter.

In 2007, there were 11 traffic accidents in Bogucice. The places with the highest number of such incidents include W. Roździeński Avenue and Leopolda Street.

Fire protection in Bogucice is provided by Rescue and Firefighting Unit No. 1 Szopienice of the Municipal Headquarters of the State Fire Service in Katowice at 130 Krakowska Street. Historically, there was a volunteer fire brigade operating in Bogucice, founded in 1880 (or 1878). From 1905, the headquarters and watchtower were located at 39–41 L. Markiefki Street. In 1928, the brigade in Bogucice was one of six such units in Katowice.

The Municipal Social Welfare Center covers Bogucice through two Local Social Welfare Points located in neighboring districts: No. 3 in Koszutka at Misjonarzy Oblatów MN Street (for the western part of Bogucice) and No. 6 in Zawodzie at B. Czech Street (for eastern Bogucice). At the end of 2013, 414 families from Bogucice were receiving assistance from the institution.

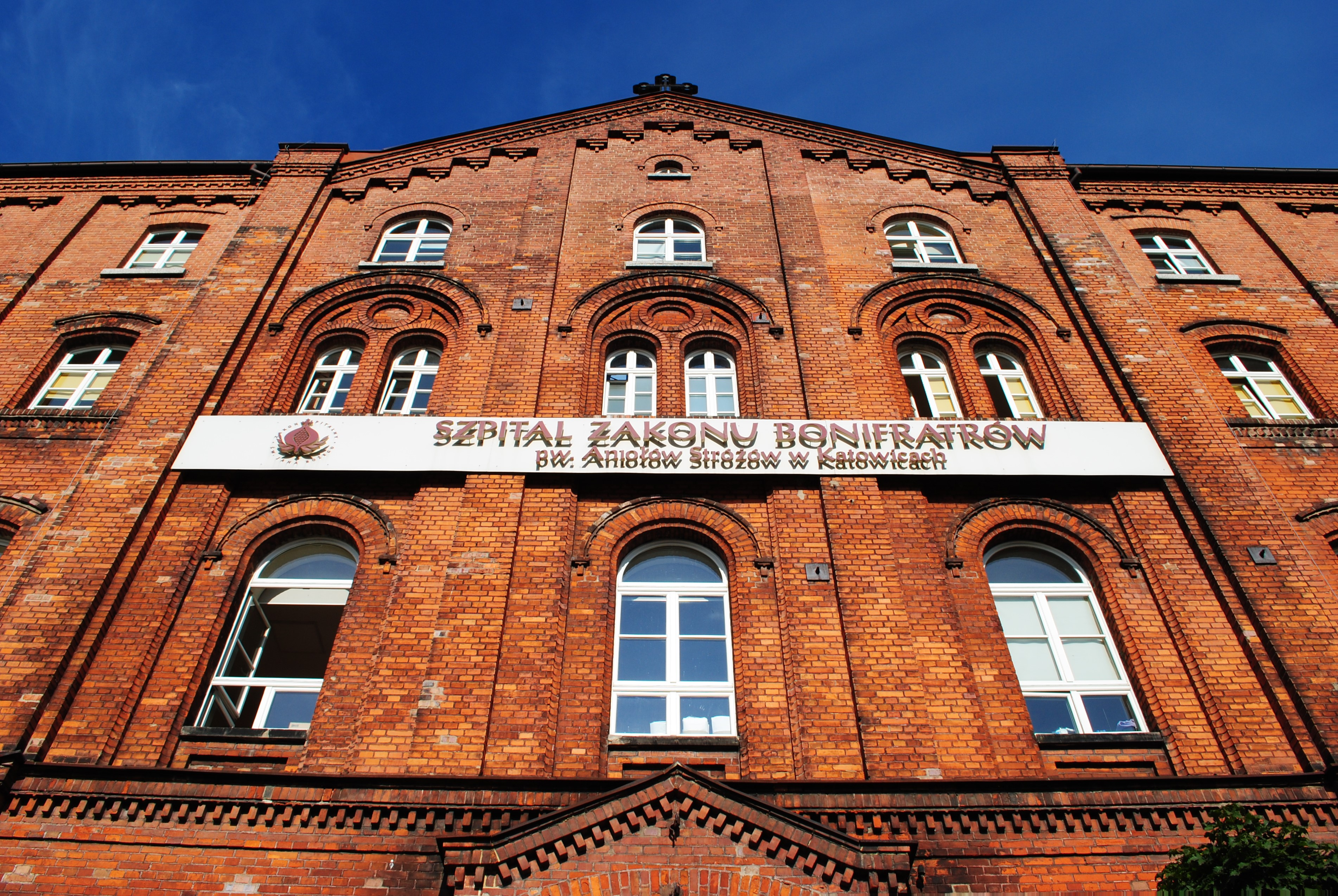
Part of the Hospital of Brothers Hospitallers of Saint John of God seen from L. Markiefka Street (2020)

The present-day Hospital of Brothers Hospitallers of Saint John of God was the first healthcare facility for the residents of Katowice. It was established on the initiative of the Association for the Poor (German: Ortsarmen- Verband) of Katowice, Bogucice, and Dąbrówka Mała. For this purpose, apartments were rented from Josephine Markiefka in Bogucice on 20 October 1865. The Sisters of Mercy, who also ran the Bogucice orphanage, took care of the sick and nursed them. The beginnings of the new building date back to 1871, when Father Leopold Markiefka donated land and 5,000 thalers for the construction of a hospital, which was taken over by the Brothers Hospitallers of Saint John of God from their mother house in Wrocław. The Hospital of the Holy Guardian Angels was officially opened on 7 September 1874. A two-story building with 105 beds was made available to sick men, and in addition to the hospital, an outpatient clinic and a Medical-Mechanical Institute for convalescents were opened. The hospital also carried out charitable activities and, from 1875, cooperated with an orphanage. The hospital was expanded between 1902 and 1903 (or between 1903 and 1904), providing 160 new hospital beds.

By 1920, the hospital had four wards: internal medicine, surgery, dermatology, and laryngology. In the 1920s, the administration of the hospital was taken over by the authorities of Katowice. Between 1933 and 1936, it was expanded by one floor and equipped with modern apparatus. In November 1939, the Brothers Hospitallers were displaced from the hospital, and the facility was handed over to the military authorities. The building was converted into a military hospital with 240–260 beds. After World War II, the L. Rydygier Municipal Hospital No. 1 was established in the buildings leased by the city. After regaining the facility, the Brothers Hospitallers resumed their activities on 1 April 2009.

Bruno Sogalla and Maksymilian Wilimowski, among others, served as chief physicians at the Bogucice hospital.

At 3 W. Roździeński Avenue, there was a building from the 1920s, which housed, among other things, a mine clinic, and in 1961, a Medical and Preventive Care Center with clinics and a sick bay was established there. The building was demolished between 2001 and 2003.

As of June 2022, other healthcare facilities in Bogucice include: the Bracka Neighbourhood Clinic (21 Brzozowa Street) and the Bonifraternal Health Centre (48 W. Wróblewski Street). There are also two larger dental clinics and a number of private medical practices.

== Culture ==
The beginnings of organized cultural activity in Bogucice date back to the end of the 19th century. From 1885, civic committees organizing theatrical performances were active there. In the same year, the Catholic Workers' Union was established at the Bogucice parish, which developed various educational and cultural activities. Six years later, in 1891, the Catholic Workers' Union was established, which organized theatrical performances from 1892. In 1893, the group staged four plays by P. Kołodziej. In 1894, one of the first secular singing clubs in Upper Silesia – Lutnia – was founded by young people from Bogucice, Dąbrówka Mała, and Zawodzie, with Paweł Sus as its president. Due to the persecution of its members for their membership, in 1900 (or 1898) Lutnia was renamed the Dobroczynność Society (or the Charity Society). On 12 September 1902 (or in 1909), the Lira mixed choir was established, with Józef Wieczorek as its president and Leon Poniecki as its conductor. It operated until 1934.

The St. Cecilia Choir was founded in 1909 at the parish of St. Stephen. It originally operated as a singing club, and from 1918 as the Polish Church Choir. In 1935, it had 140 members, and two years later it won first prize from Polish Radio Katowice at the Choral Convention in Chorzów. In 1946, the choir resumed its activities. Its achievements include participation in the welcoming ceremonies for Pope John Paul II at the airport in Muchowiec and the organization of an annual series of concerts to celebrate the 100th anniversary of Karol Hoppe's birth. In 1919, the Juliusz Ligoń Choir (initially known as Lira) was founded at the Ferdinand (Katowice) Coal Mine, operating until 1956. On 18 September 1935, the Chopin Mandolin Society was registered, with its headquarters at 1 Katowicka Street. In 1934, it organized the Silesian Mandolin Championship. The society ceased its activities on 1 September 1939.

The first cinema in Bogucice was the Fryderyk Cinema, mentioned in 1910. Its exact location is unknown. In the interwar period, the Bajka Cinema was built.

In the interwar period, Bogucice had a library run by the People's Libraries Society. In 1935, the Bogucice branch had 833 volumes and 213 readers. In 1936, the People's House was built on L. Markiefka Street from public donations. After World War II, the building was taken over by the Katowice mine as a company cultural center, and in 2002, the city assumed ownership. The building continues to serve cultural functions and currently it functions as the Bogucice Branch of the Bogucice-Zawodzie Municipal Cultural Center, headquartered at 44a L. Markiefka Street.

The Millenium Cinema began operating on 22 July 1966 in the building of the former Gasthaus at 59 K. Markiefka Street until the 1990s.

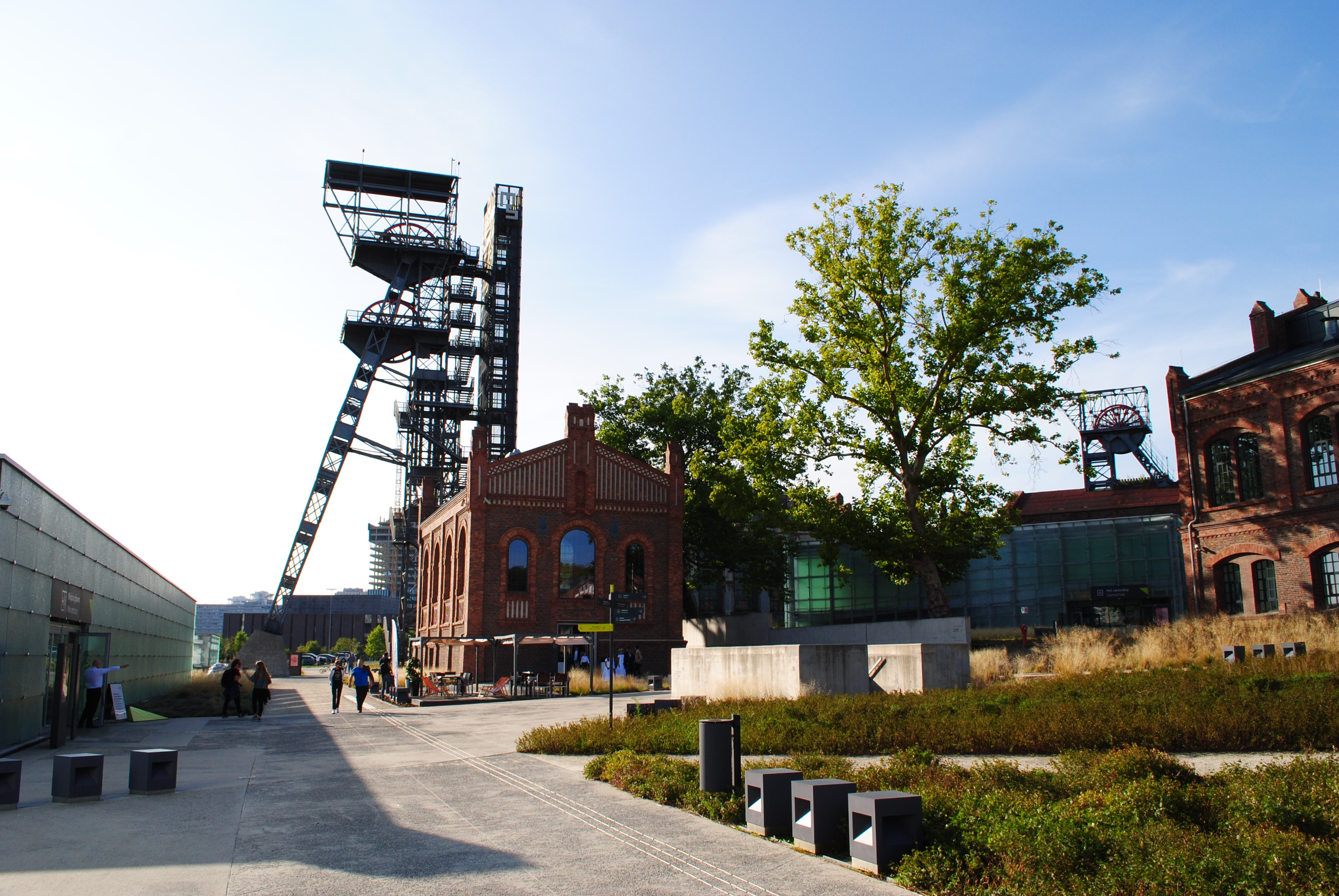
Silesian Museum, operating on the site of the former Katowice Coal Mine

In addition to the Katowice mine brass band, the Youth Brass Band of the Katowice Mining School was also successful in the 1980s. It ceased its activities when the mine closed, but its conductor, Stefan Łebek, later worked with the Katowice Brass Band Music and Cultural Association. Under the patronage of the Bogucice Branch of the Bogucice-Zawodzie Municipal Cultural Center, the Katowice-Kleofas Accordion Ensemble, founded by Stanisław Wodnicki in 1988, operates.

In 1980, scenes for the film Grzeszny żywot Franciszka Buły (The Sinful Life of Franciszek Buła) were filmed on Węglana Street and in the parish church, as well as scenes for You Are God, which featured, among others, Osiedle W. Wajdy and the areas around the Bogucice Kościół bus stop. Piotr Łuszcz (Magik) – a musician, early member of Kaliber 44, and founder of Paktofonika – lived in Bogucice from birth until his tragic death in 2000. Other musicians associated with the district include Marcin and Michał Marten (AbradAb and Joka), members of Kaliber 44, and Wojciech Alszer (Fokus), a member of Paktofonika.

There are three branches of the Katowice Municipal Public Library in Bogucice: Branch No. 16 (16 W. Wajda Street), and Branch No. 33 (44a L. Markiefka Street).

The Bogucice Culture Zone also hosts a number of outdoor events, including the "I Love Katowice" City Birthday and the Nowa Muzyka Festival, while the nearby Bogucice Park is a venue for festivals and district events, including the annual Bogucice Days festival for district residents.

The Silesian Museum is located at 1 T. Dobrowolski Street, in the complex of the former Katowice mine. The museum has had its new headquarters since 2015. It offers a number of attractions and exhibitions, including: "The Light of History: Upper Silesia Through the Ages" (chronicling the history of the Upper Silesian region), Polish art galleries, amateur art galleries, a gallery of Silesian sacred art, and others. The Silesian Museum is one of the sites on the Silesian Industrial Monuments Route and the related Industriada event. It also regularly hosts the Long Night of Museums and events connected with the European Heritage Days.

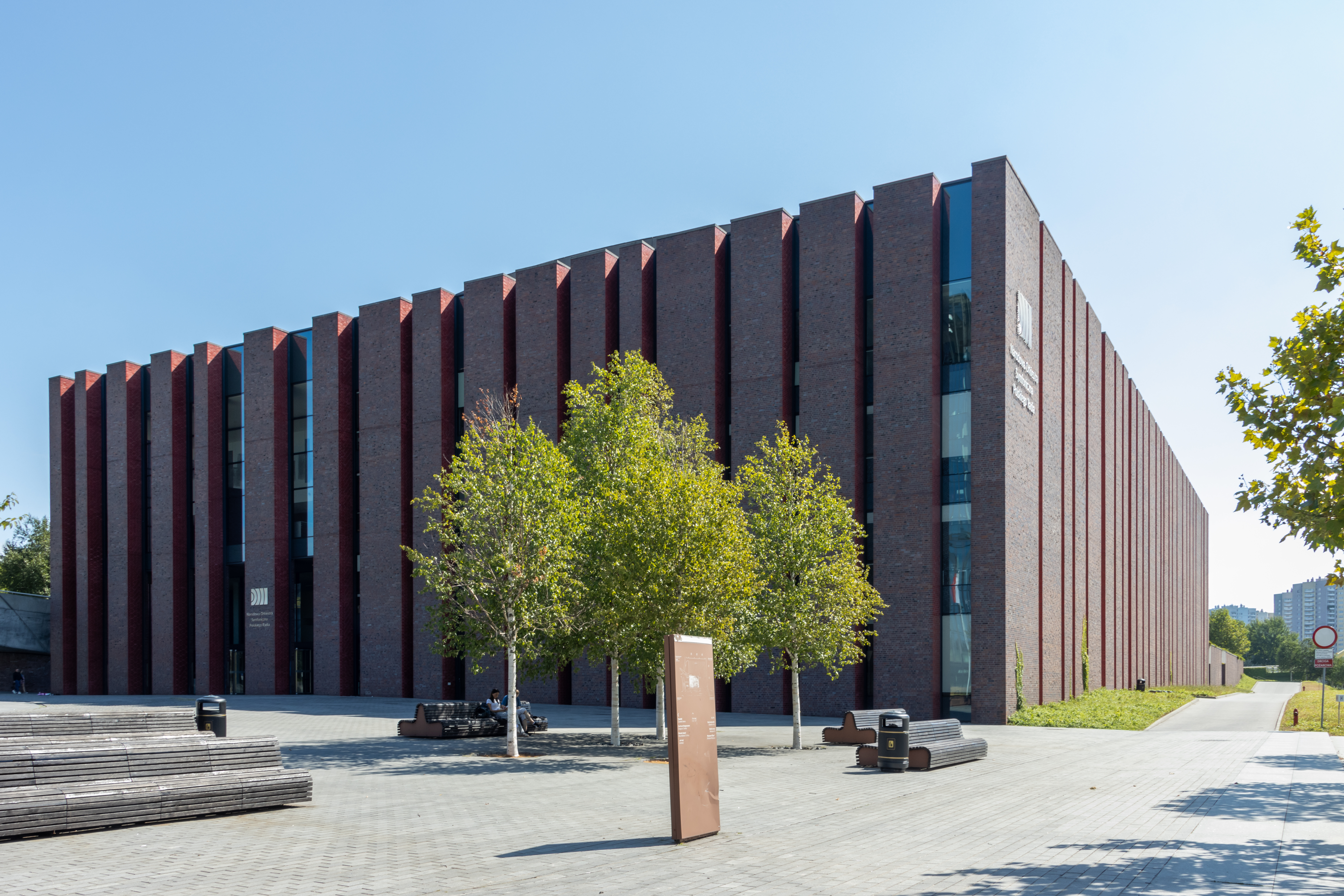
Building of the Polish National Radio Symphony Orchestra (1 W. Kilar Square)

Another significant cultural facility in the Bogucice part of the Culture Zone are the headquarters of the Polish National Radio Symphony Orchestra, located at 1 Wojciech Kilar Square. The building contains a concert hall with 1,800 seats. The orchestra itself is one of the most important Polish symphony orchestras in the country, with a history dating back to 1935. The ensemble was founded by Grzegorz Fitelberg, who led it until the outbreak of World War II. In March 1945, the orchestra was reactivated in Katowice. In the 1980s, the musicians moved to Śródmieście, to a building belonging to the institution known as Katowice – Miasto Ogrodów. Many prominent musicians from the region, including Henryk Górecki, Wojciech Kilar, and Krystian Zimerman, appealed for the construction of a new headquarters. Its official opening took place on 1 October 2014.

In November 2020, the city authorities initiated the creation of a trail of Katowice murals, most of which were made as part of individual editions of the Katowice Street Art Festival. As of June 2022, the following murals are located in Bogucice:

- Underground passageway near Osiedle Walentego Roździeńskiego – two murals from 2011. One of them depicts Piotr Łuszcz (Magik), a rapper from Bogucice, and the other depicts Jerzy Kukuczka. murals were commissioned by Katowice – Miasto Ogrodów in connection with the city's bid for the title of European Capital of Culture;
- 44a L. Markiefka Street – a mural at the Bogucice-Zawodzie Municipal Cultural Center, created in 2020 by residents of Katowice under the artistic coordination of Joanna Strząbała. It presents important places, figures, and events related to the Silesian Uprisings;
- L. Markiefka Street / Katowicka Street – a mural from 2019 depicting Jerzy Kukuczka, created by Wojciech Walczyk.

== Religion ==
=== Roman Catholic Church ===
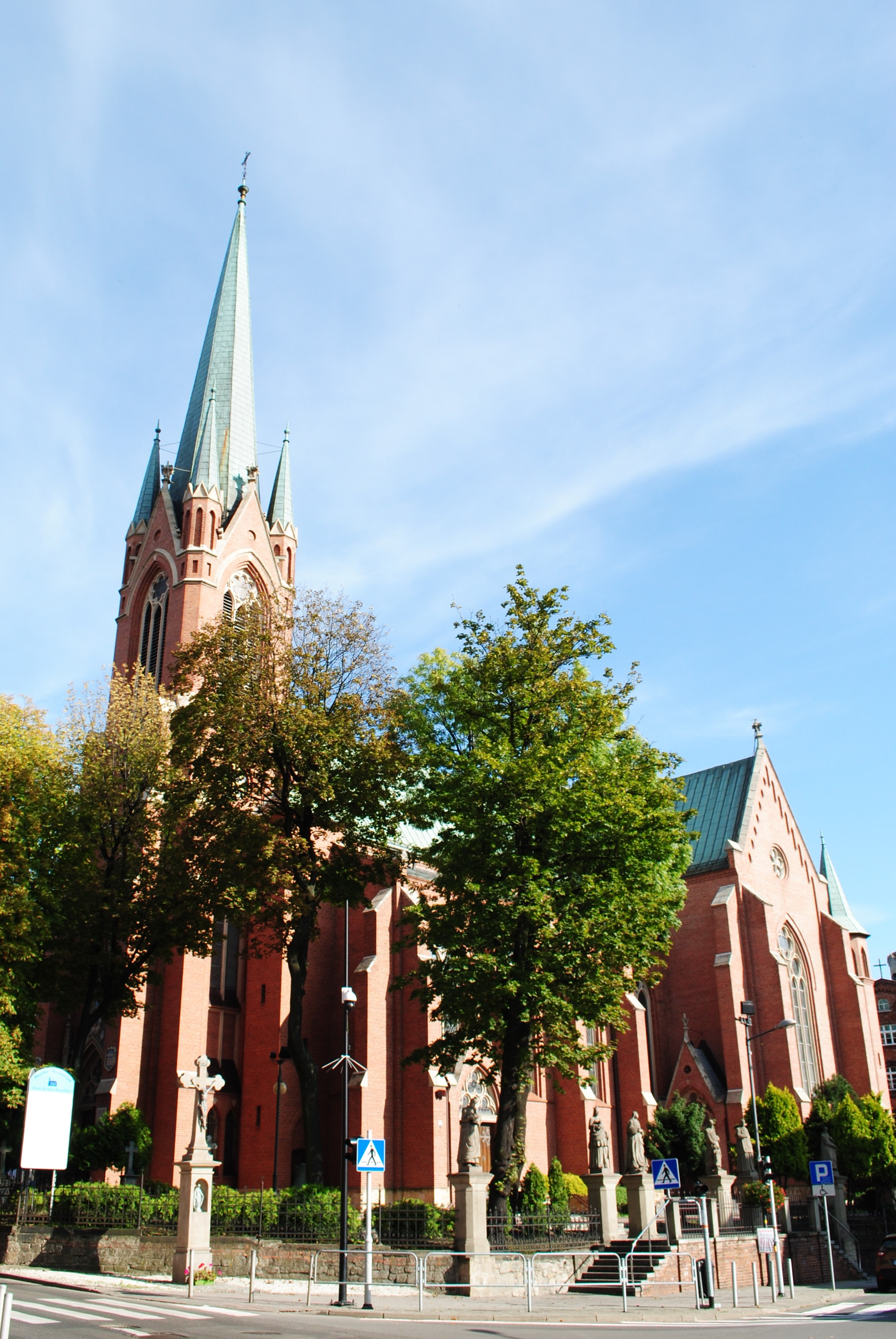
Roman Catholic St. Stephen's Church, situated at the corner of L. Markiefka and Leopolda streets

Bogucice is home to the Roman Catholic Parish of St. Stephen, located at 89 L. Markiefka Street. it serves the faithful from across the district, numbering around 15,100 in 2014. Parish festivals are organized on the Feast of the Visitation of the Blessed Virgin Mary (the first Sunday of June) and on St. Stephen's Day (26 December). The Bogucice parish is also the seat of the Katowice-Bogucice deanery, which includes eight parishes from the eastern part of the city. Pastoral activity is very active there, with lay people organizing themselves into various parish groups. There is a well-developed ministry for children in groups such as Children of Mary, and for young people in the Oasis Movement, as well as a group for students and working youth. Since 1993, a group for renewal in the Holy Spirit has been developing. The Brotherhood of the Living Rosary has also been established, and the Group of Worshipers of the Mother of Beautiful Love and a men's liturgical group are also active there.

Historically, in terms of church affiliation, the entire Katowice, including Bogucice, first belonged to the Diocese of Kraków, established in 1000. The oldest parish in Katowice – the Bogucice parish – included not only the district itself, but also the faithful from Brynów, Dąbrówka Mała, Katowice, Ligota, Zawodzie, and Załęże. The exact date of the establishment of the Roman Catholic parish in Bogucice is unknown; it was likely established between 1374 and 1396, with the first mentions of its existence dating back to 1414 and 1529. In the preserved records of Peter's Pence from the Diocese of Kraków for the period 1326–1356 and for the year 1374, the parish does not yet appear. Its existence is only confirmed by an entry in the court book of the Kraków Land from 1403, which mentions the parish church of St. Stephen and St. Dorothy, as well as the then parish priest, Father Mikołaj. Information about the existence of a second church "on the hill" comes from the visitation report of Canon Krzysztof Kazimirski, who arrived in November 1598 to visit the Bogucice parish. The church "on the hill" was located in the area of today's Bogucice cemetery and was the first church in the district. Father Bronisław Czaplicki, however, states that the oldest source mentioning the existence of church buildings in Bogucice dates back to 1598, the time of the Reformation in Silesia.

In 1598, the minutes of the visitation of the parish in Bogucice mentioned a miraculous painting in the local church:

In this parish, there is a famous chapel dedicated to the Visitation of the Blessed Virgin Mary. [...] The largest influx of people [concursus populi maximus] occurs on the feast of the Visitation of the Blessed Virgin Mary. This chapel is located in the place of an older and smaller one, similar to the previous one, built with donations from the people.

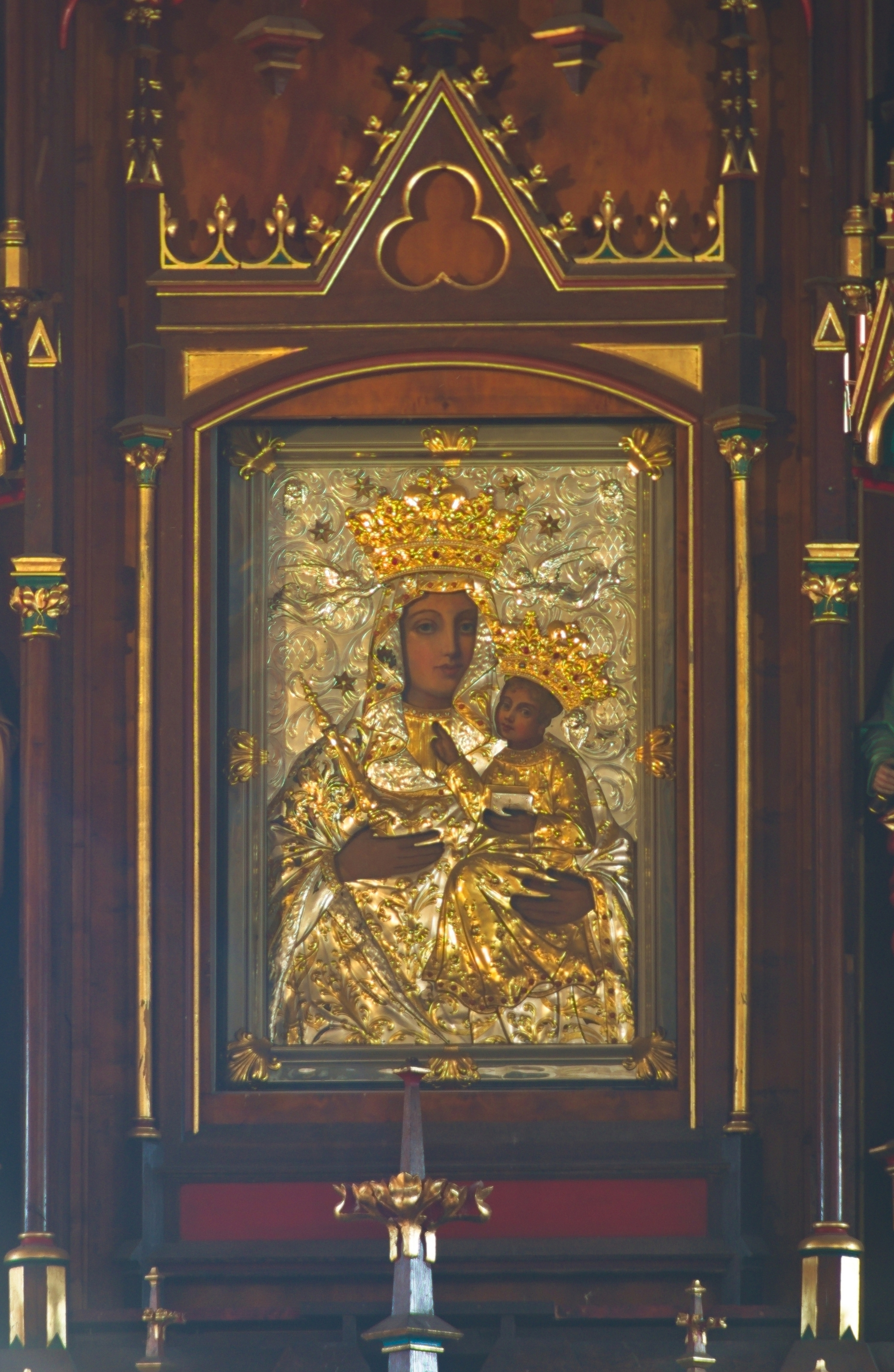
Image of Our Lady of Bogucice in St. Stephen's Church

From the end of the 14th century to the end of the 18th century, several wooden churches were built in Bogucice, including St. Stephen's Church and the pilgrimage Church of the Visitation of the Blessed Virgin Mary, which already existed in the 15th century and is associated with the beginning of the cult of the image of Our Lady of Bogucice. The last of the wooden churches dates back to 1773 and was built by master carpenter Jan Wiesner from present-day Strzelce Opolskie. It survived until 1891.

The Bogucice parish was relatively small in the 18th century – in 1721, only 400 people were able to receive Easter communion. In the early 1760s, the Archconfraternity of the Scapular of Our Lady of Mount Carmel was established in Bogucice and conducted lively activities. Statistical sources for the Bogucice parish are only available from the end of the 18th century. In 1790, out of 1,019 communicants, 276 came from Bogucice, while the rest came from Katowice, Załęże, and Dąbrówka Mała. In 1816, the Easter communion book lists 325 people receiving communion from Bogucice.

The area of the Pszczyna and Bytom deaneries, including the Bogucice parish, was incorporated into the Diocese of Wrocław by virtue of Pope Pius VII's De salute animarum of 16 July 1821. On 28 August 1868, the Myslowice deanery was separated, which included, among others, the Bogucice parish. In 1889, 7,406 Catholics lived in Bogucice and Zawodzie.

In 1894, the construction of the new Gothic Revival St. Stephen's Church was completed, and it was consecrated by the Bishop of Wrocław, Cardinal Georg von Kopp. The construction of the new temple was initiated by Father Leopold Markiefka and continued between 1892 and 1894 by Father Ludwik Skowronek. In 1894, the painting of Our Lady of Bogucice was moved to the new church, where it was placed in a side altar. The image was painted on a 120×79 cm board using tempera on a chalk base. In 1930, it was restored in Kraków by Jan Bąkowski.

On 1 March 1923, the Bogucice parish became part of the Katowice deanery, and two years later, pursuant to the papal bull of 28 October 1925, the Diocese of Katowice was established, which also included the Parish of St. Stephen. During World War II, from June 1940, all pastoral activities in Bogucice were conducted exclusively in German. Despite this approach, due to his well-known pro-Polish attitude, Father Franciszek Ścigała was arrested on 30 April 1940 and removed from the parish. He was imprisoned in the Dachau concentration camp, and then in Gusen, where he died on 2 September 1940.

=== Other denominations ===
The number of non-Catholics in Bogucice grew gradually. In 1816, there were no Protestants living in the parish area and only one Jew was recorded, while in the 1820s there were few non-Catholics, usually one or two families. In 1825, 9 people of the Jewish faith lived in the district. Due to industrial development, immigrants also arrived there, among them Catholics, Evangelicals, and Jews.

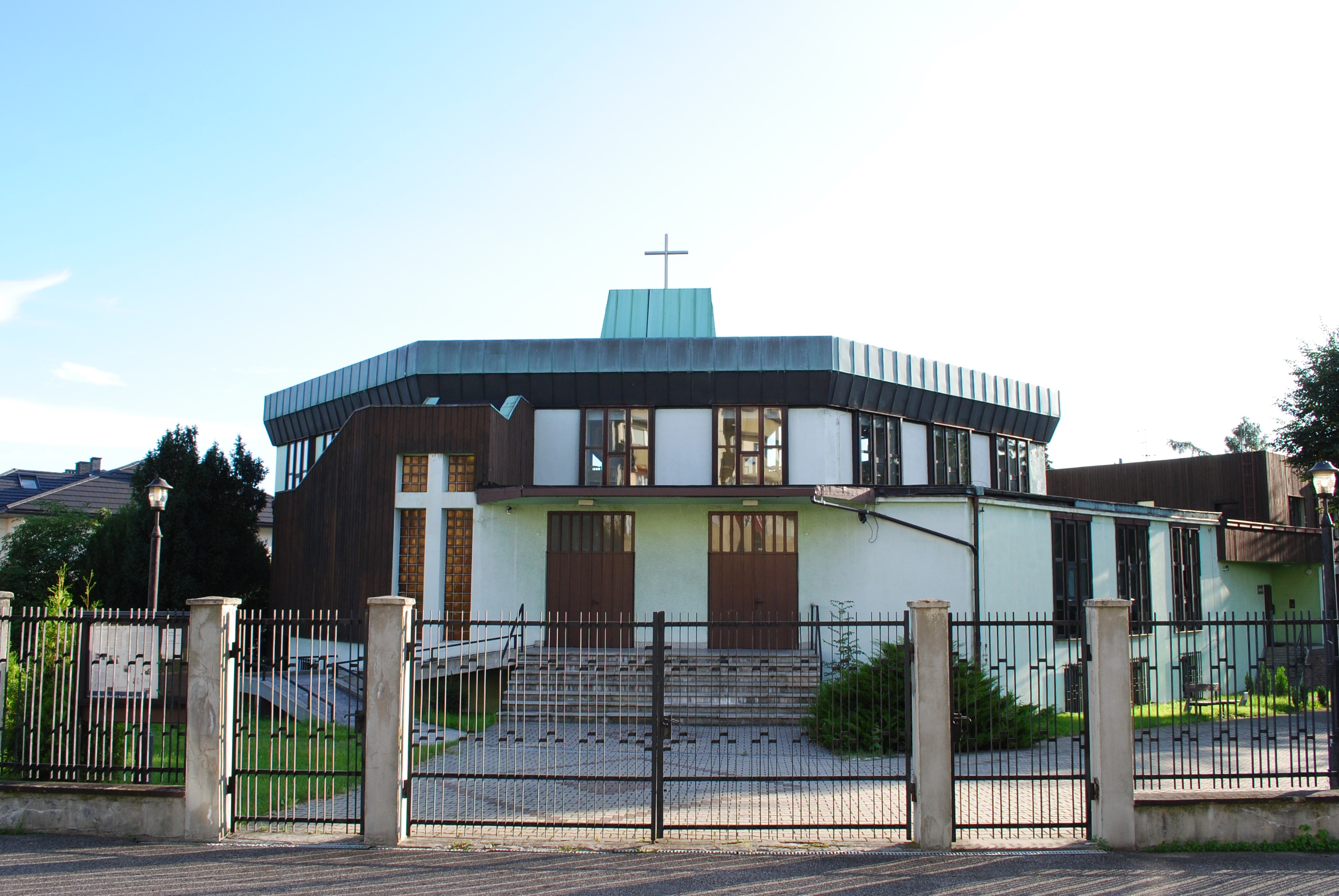
Church of the First Baptist Christian Congregation in Katowice at 10 Morawska Street

Before the construction of non-Catholic churches in present-day Katowice, Protestants from Bogucice attended services in Mikołów and Królewska Huta, while Jews went to Mysłowice. In accordance with the statute adopted in 1857 by the Evangelical parish of Katowice, its jurisdiction included, among others, the faithful from Bogucice. The consecration ceremony of the Evangelical Church of the Resurrection on 24 September 1858 was also attended by the then parish priest of the Roman Catholic parish in Bogucice, Father Leopold Markiefka, who cooperated very well with the Evangelicals. The Jews of Bogucice joined the newly established Jewish community in Katowice in 1879. The visitation records from 1932 indicate that, apart from Catholics, there were about 200 Protestants, 15 Jews, and 20 members of the National Church living in Bogucice.

The First Baptist Christian Church in Katowice is located at 10 Morawska Street. The congregation was formally established on 3 September 1922. In the 1930s, its chapel was set up at 7 Zabrska Street. After World War II, Baptists continued to hold services there, and until their own chapel was built in Bogucice, they were welcomed by Katowice Evangelicals. Between 1982 and 1985 (or between 1980 and 1985), the church of the First Baptist Christian Congregation was built at 10 Morawska Street in Bogucice. It was opened on 25 September 1985 and was built with donations from believers and supporters from Poland and abroad. It had 200 members in 1996. On 15 May 2012, the temple hosted celebrations of the 90th anniversary of the first Baptist congregation in Katowice, attended by followers of other Christian religions.

On the site of the former Katowice mine, at 9 Nadgórników Street, a Kingdom Hall was built, which is a local meeting place for Jehovah's Witnesses. The original Kingdom Hall was located on the edge of Bogucice Park. In 2016, Polish Jehovah's Witnesses submitted applications for its demolition and the construction of a new facility in its place. The old building was demolished in 2019, and in April 2024, a new complex of two Halls with an underground car park was opened.

=== Cemeteries ===
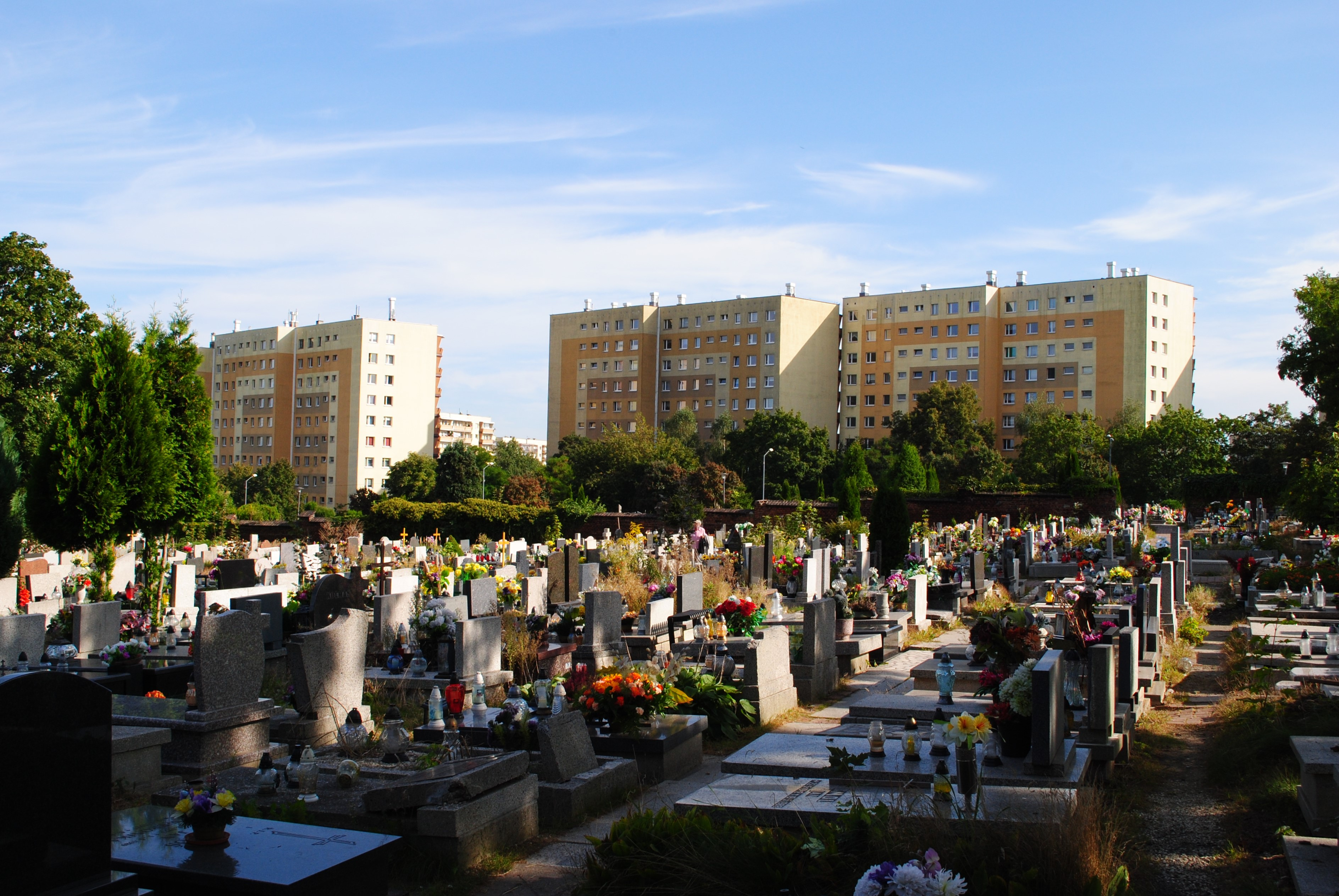
Section of the Bogucice cemetery; in the background, Osiedle Kukuczki

The only cemetery in Bogucice is the Roman Catholic cemetery of the Parish of St. Stephen, located on W. Wróblewski Street. It covers an area of 7.574 ha and has over 1.5 ha of reserve land. It consists of two cemeteries: a monastic cemetery belonging to the Brothers Hospitallers and a parish one. It is the oldest necropolis in Katowice.

The first cemetery in Bogucice was likely established at the end of the 14th century. In accordance with the rules in force at the time, it was located around a wooden church, was fenced off, and had a morgue next to it. It was closed in 1894. The first mention of the cemetery dates back to 1598. From the 18th century, local nobility were buried "on the hill," and it is likely that a second parish cemetery in Bogucice already existed at that time. In the 19th century, burials began to take place there regularly, which marked the beginning of the cemetery on W. Wróblewski Street.

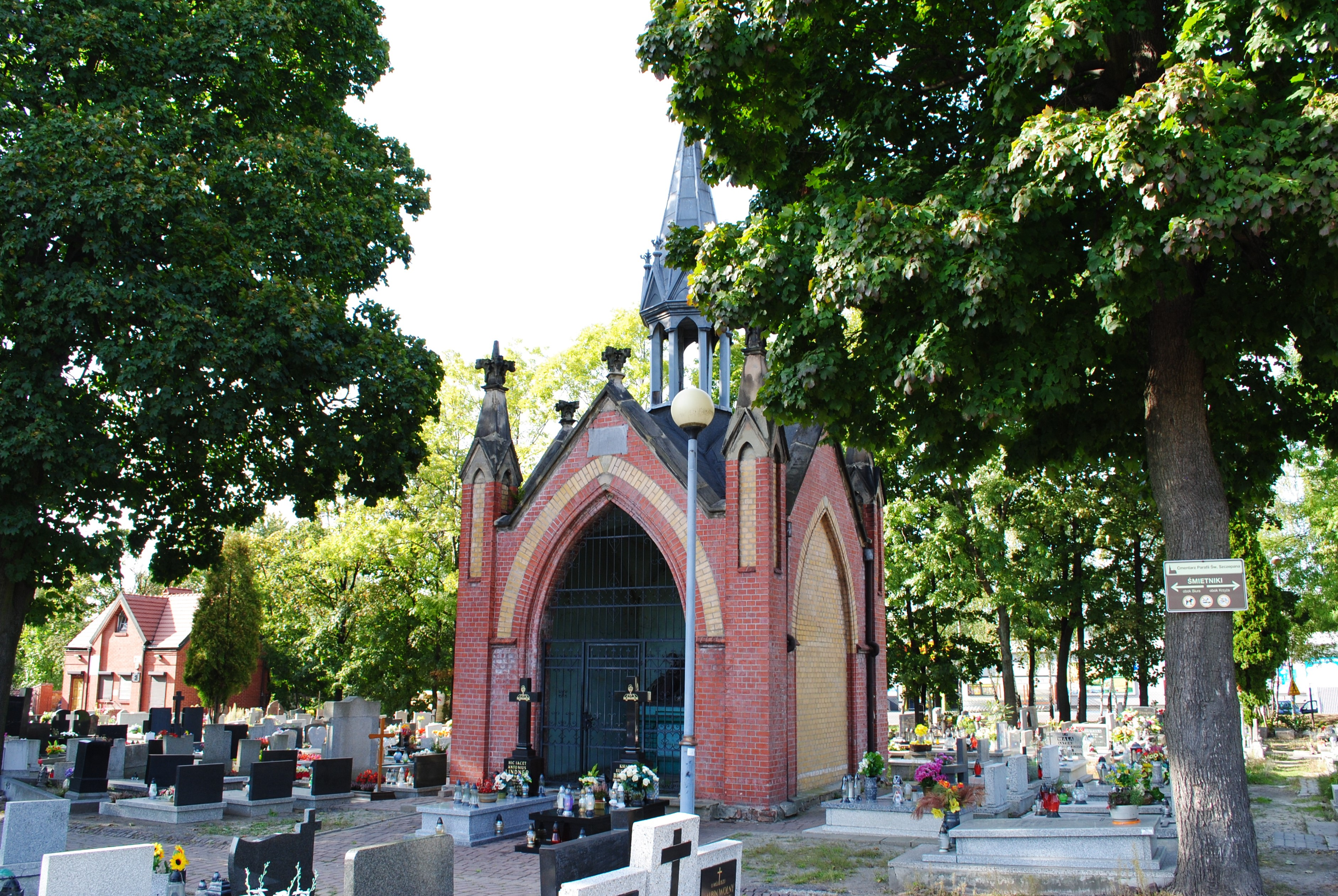
Garden of Gethsemane chapel in the cemetery

Before the establishment of the Evangelical parish, deceased Evangelicals were buried in the Bogucice cemetery from 23 July 1856 with the consent of Father Leopold Markiefka.

Brothers Hospitallers have been buried in the Bogucice cemetery since the 1870s. No gravestones from the 19th century have survived there, or, according to Barbara Lewicka, only a few remain – one of the oldest gravestones in Katowice is the monument to Bartłomiej Kulerski, a butcher who died on 12 January 1825. The cemetery has a Garden of Gethsemane chapel from 1894, built according to a design by Erich Keil. It was founded by Johann Stalislowski, a merchant from Załęże, who also placed his family crypt there. The current cemetery chapel dates back to 1910 and was designed by Mansuetus Fromm. It was built in the Romanesque Revival style, and Bogucice parish priests are buried there or are commemorated by epitaph plaques.

In January 1943, the cemetery was requisitioned by the municipal administration. It is likely that the graves of insurgents from the interwar period were destroyed at that time. In the 1990s, the paths were paved and illuminated, and in 1998, the cemetery wall was rebuilt.

== Sport and recreation ==
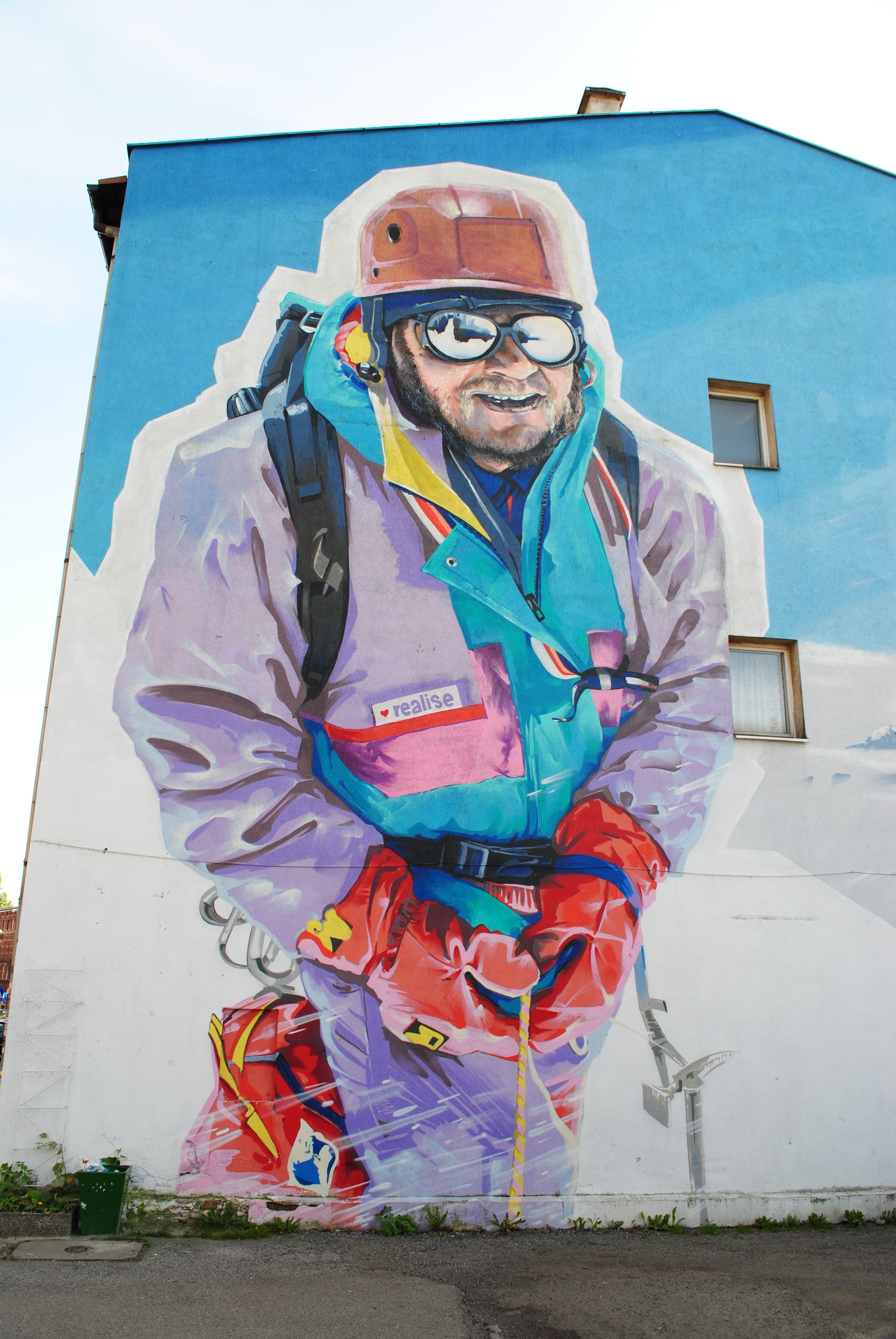
Mural at L. Markiefka Street depicting Jerzy Kukuczka

Organized sports and recreational activities in Bogucice have been developing since the beginning of the 20th century. In 1911, the Bogucice branch of the Sokół Polish Gymnastic Society was established under the leadership of Franciszek Głowacki and Jan Brzeskot. In 1917, the society resumed its activities, with 180 members in 1919. The Bogucice branch of Sokół was managed by Antoni Wysocki, Henryk Miękina, and Wiktor Kuś. On 1 July 1920, the Gwiazda sports club was founded in Bogucice, with a football section. It participated in the Katowice District Upper Silesian Football Association championship. In 1923, the club merged with KS Sztandar Bogucice. In 1929, the single-section 29 Boxing Sports Club Bogucice was founded on the initiative of Franciszek Drozdek. The club's achievements include three bronze medals in the Polish championships between 1932 and 1933. Between 1922 and 1939, there were 11 sports organizations operating in the district.

On 20 February 1945, the 1920 Sports Society Bogucice was reactivated, continuing the tradition of Gwiazda. The club was one of the first to be reactivated in Katowice. In 1948, it became associated with the mining industry, creating the multi-section KS Górnik. It became the largest mining sports entity in Katowice, with sports facilities throughout the city. Between 1957 and 1964, it merged with other mining clubs in Katowice to form GKS Katowice.

Jerzy Kukuczka was born in Bogucice at 94 L. Markiefka Street on 24 March 1948. He was a distinguished mountaineer, leader of many mountain expeditions, and author of new routes in the Himalayas. He conquered the so-called Crown of the Himalayas, and was a member of the Gen. Mariusz Zaruski Scout Mountaineering Club in Katowice. He died during the descent from the south face of Lhotse on 24 October 1989, and in the same year, a housing estate in Bogucice was named after him.

In 2007, there were six sports clubs operating in the district. Stages of the Tour de Pologne cycling race passing through Katowice run through Bogucice.

Bogucice has outdoor gyms in three locations: on Modrzewiowa Street, a Street Workout facility on 2 W. Wajda Street, and an outdoor gym on Koszycki Square. BLOKatowice operates at 18 Karoliny Street – it is the only bouldering gym in the region, equipped with climbing walls with an area of over 800 m², training equipment, changing rooms with showers, and a bar. At 5 Wiązowa Street, there is the SquashOK squash and fitness club, equipped with seven squash courts and fitness rooms.

One tourist trail passes through Bogucice:

- Upper Silesian Mining History Trail: Łubianki – Siemianowice Śląskie – Katowice (L. Markiefka Street) – Mikołów – Orzesze – Rybnik.

== Famous inhabitants of Bogucice ==
- Alfons Bialetzki (born 1919), Wehrmacht officer
- Kordian Jajszczok, Polish ice hockey player
- Jerzy Kukuczka, Polish alpine and high-altitude climber

== Bibliography ==
- Barciak, Antoni; Chojecka, Ewa; Fertacz, Sylwester, eds. (2012). Katowice. Środowisko, dzieje, kultura, język i społeczeństwo [Katowice: Environment, History, Culture, Language and Society] (in Polish). Vol. 1–2. Katowice: Museum of the History of Katowice. ISBN 978-83-87727-24-6.
- Bartoszek, Adam; Czekaj, Krzysztof; Trawkowska, Dobroniega, eds. (2012). Diagnoza problemów społecznych i monitoring polityki społecznej dla aktywizacji zasobów ludzkich w Katowicach [Diagnosis of Social Problems and Social Policy Monitoring for Human Resource Activation in Katowice] (in Polish). Katowice: University of Silesia. ISBN 978-83-61061-97-7.
- Borowy, Robert (1997). Wczoraj – dziś – jutro ...kopalni „Katowice-Kleofas": historia węglem pisana [Yesterday – Today – Tomorrow ... of the "Katowice-Kleofas" Mine: A History Written in Coal] (in Polish). Katowice: Piotr Tyrtania. ISBN 83-907139-2-6. OCLC 750538394.
- Bulsa, Michał (2018). Ulice i place Katowic [Streets and Squares of Katowice] (in Polish) (3rd ed.). Katowice: Prasa i Książka. ISBN 978-83-63780-28-9.
- Bulsa, Michał; Szmatloch, Barbara (2019). Katowice, których nie ma [Katowice That No Longer Exists] (in Polish). Łódź: Księży Młyn. ISBN 978-83-7729-502-1.
- Chmielewska, M. (2016). Morfologiczne przekształcenia przestrzeni miejskiej Katowic [Morphological Transformations of the Urban Space of Katowice] (in Polish). Katowice: University of Silesia. ISBN 978-83-8012-837-8.
- Czaplicki, Bronisław (2014). Górnośląski duszpasterz ks. Leopold Markiefka (1813-1882) i jego dzieła [The Upper Silesian Pastor Fr. Leopold Markiefka (1813–1882) and His Works] (in Polish). Lubliniec: SM Niniwa. ISBN 978-83-939332-0-4. OCLC 894963063.
- Drobek, Daria; Michalska, Ewa; Radecki, Ryszard; Perdyła, Magdalena (January 2014). Opracowanie ekofizjograficzne podstawowe z elementami opracowania ekofizjograficznego problemowego (problematyka ochrony dolin rzecznych oraz ograniczeń dla zagospodarowania terenu wynikających z wpływu działalności górniczej) dla potrzeb opracowania projektów miejscowych planów zagospodarowania przestrzennego obszarów położonych w mieście Katowice [Basic Ecophysiographic Study with Elements of a Problem-Oriented Ecophysiographic Study (Issues of River Valley Protection and Constraints on Land Development Resulting from the Impact of Mining Activity) for the Purposes of Preparing Draft Local Spatial Development Plans for Areas Located within the City of Katowice] (in Polish). Katowice: Werona.
- Drobniak, Adam; Polko, Adam; Plac, Klaudia, eds. (2014). Diagnoza sytuacji społeczno-ekonomicznej Miasta Katowice wraz z wyznaczeniem obszarów rewitalizacji i analizą strategiczną [Diagnosis of the Socio-Economic Situation of the City of Katowice Together with the Designation of Regeneration Areas and a Strategic Analysis] (PDF) (in Polish). Katowice: City of Katowice. ISBN 978-83-61061-97-7.
- Dulias, Renata; Hibszer, Adam, eds. (2008). Górnośląski Związek Metropolitalny. Zarys geograficzny [Upper Silesian Metropolitan Union: A Geographical Outline] (in Polish). Sosnowiec: Katowice Branch of the Polish Geographical Society. ISBN 978-83-61695-00-4.
- Frużyński, Adam; Grzegorek, Grzegorz; Rygus, Piotr (2017). Kopalnie i huty Katowic [Mines and Ironworks of Katowice] (in Polish). Katowice: Prasa i Książka. ISBN 978-83-63780-23-4.
- Górecki, Jan (1997). Sanktuarium Boguckie [Bogucice Sanctuary] (in Polish) (2nd ed.). Katowice: City Hall. ISBN 83-86922-34-6. OCLC 749538163.
- Grzegorek, Grzegorz; Tabaczyński, Piotr (2014). Parafie i kościoły Katowic [Parishes and Churches of Katowice] (in Polish). Katowice: Prasa i Książka. ISBN 978-83-63780-06-7.
- Kubica, A. (2007). "Zmiany struktury społecznej na obszarze parafii bogucickiej w latach 1800–1865 w świetle opisów statystyczno-geograficznych" [Changes in the Social Structure in the Area of the Bogucice Parish in the Years 1800–1865 in the Light of Statistical and Geographical Descriptions]. In Barciak, A. (ed.). Katowice. W 141 rocznicę uzyskania praw miejskich. Przemiany protoindustrialne i industrialne jako czynnik miastotwórczy Katowic [Katowice. On the 141st Anniversary of Obtaining City Rights. Protoindustrial and Industrial Transformations as a City-Forming Factor of Katowice] (in Polish). Katowice: Societas Scientiis Favendis Silesiae Superioris. ISBN 978-83-86053-64-3. OCLC 237050922.
- Moskal, Jerzy, ed. (1993). Bogucice, Załęże et nova villa Katowice: rozwój w czasie i przestrzeni [Bogucice, Załęże and Nova Villa Katowice: Development in Time and Space] (in Polish). Katowice: Śląsk. ISBN 83-85831-35-5. OCLC 69327935.
- Nowak, Z., ed. (2016). Dzieje Bogucic w kronice szkoły, 1865-1975 [History of Bogucice in the School Chronicle, 1865–1975] (in Polish). Translated by Borowy, R. Katowice: Śląsk. ISBN 978-83-7164-910-3. OCLC 1245958171.
- Lewicka, B. (2017). Nekropolie: socjologiczne studium cmentarzy Katowic [Necropolis: sociological study of the cemeteries of Katowice] (in Polish) (1st ed.). Katowice: University of Silesia. ISBN 978-83-8012-960-3. OCLC 1065550762.
- Piwowarczyk, P. (2014). Historia parafii i kościoła pw. św. Szczepana w Katowicach-Bogucicach [History of the Parish and the Church of Saint Stephen in Katowice–Bogucice] (in Polish). Katowice: Parish of Saint Stephen. ISBN 978-83-7593-234-8. OCLC 898275404.
- "Raport o stanie miasta Katowice 2013" [Report on the State of the City of Katowice 2013] (PDF). katowice.eu (in Polish). 2014.
- Soida, Krzysztof (1995). Koleje wąskotorowe na Górnym Śląsku [Narrow-gauge Railways in Upper Silesia] (in Polish). Vol. I. Katowice: Śląsk. ISBN 83-85831-82-7.
- Steuer, Antoni (2022). Leksykon bogucki [Bogucice Lexicon] (in Polish). Museum of the History of Katowice. Archived from the original on 15 May 2021.
- Szaflarski, Józef, ed. (1978). Katowice 1865-1945: zarys rozwoju miasta [Katowice 1865–1945: An Outline of the Development of the City] (in Polish). Katowice: Śląsk.
- Szaraniec, Lech (1996). Osady i osiedla Katowic [Settlements and Estates of Katowice] (in Polish). Katowice: Artur. ISBN 83-905115-0-9.
- Tokarska-Guzik, Barbara; Rostański, Adam; Kupka, Roman (2002). Katowice. Przyroda miasta [Katowice. The City's Nature] (in Polish). Katowice: Wydawnictwo Kubajak. ISBN 83-87971-49-9.
- Zemła, Marek, ed. (25 April 2012). Studium uwarunkowań i kierunków zagospodarowania przestrzennego miasta Katowice – II edycja. Część 1. Uwarunkowania zagospodarowania przestrzennego [Study of the Conditions and Directions of Spatial Development of the City of Katowice – Second Edition. Part One. Conditions of Spatial Development] (PDF) (in Polish). Katowice: Biuro Rozwoju Regionu.
