= List of Catholic basilicas =

This is a complete list of basilicas of the Catholic Church. A basilica is a church with certain privileges conferred on it by the Pope.

Not all churches with "basilica" in their title actually have the ecclesiastical status, which can lead to confusion, since it is also an architectural term for a church-building style.

In the 18th century, the term took on a canonical sense, unrelated to this architectural style. Basilicas in this canonical sense are divided into major ("greater") and minor basilicas. Today only four of them, all in the Diocese of Rome, are classified as major basilicas: the major basilicas of St John Lateran, St Peter's, St Paul outside the Walls, and St Mary Major. All other canonical basilicas, currently over 1,800 in total, are minor basilicas.

By canon law no Catholic church can be honoured with the title of basilica unless by apostolic grant or from immemorial custom. The Basilica di San Nicola da Tolentino was the first minor basilica to be canonically created, in 1783. The 1917 Code of Canon Law officially recognised churches using the title of basilica from immemorial custom as having such a right to the title of minor basilica. Such churches are referred to as immemorial basilicas.

== Basilicas in Asia ==
Country	City/Municipality	Basilica	Year of Designation	Image
China	Shanghai	Basilica of Our Lady Help of Christians (She Shan Basilica)	1942	
India	See List of basilicas in India			
Israel	Haifa	Basilica of Our Lady, Star of the Sea, Stella Maris Carmelite Monastery	1839	
Israel	Jerusalem	Basilica of the Holy Sepulchre	Immemorial	
Israel	Jerusalem	Basilica of the Agony (Church of All Nations)	Immemorial	
Israel	Jerusalem	Basilica of St Stephen	1903	
Israel	Jerusalem	Basilica of the Dormition of the Virgin Mary, Hagia Maria Sion Abbey	1957	
Israel	Jerusalem	St Anne's Church	1957	
Israel	Lower Galilee	Basilica of the Transfiguration, Mount Tabor	Immemorial	
Israel	Nazareth	Basilica of the Annunciation	Immemorial	
Japan	Nagasaki	Basilica of the Twenty-Six Holy Martyrs	2016	
Kazakhstan	Karaganda	Basilica of St Joseph	2020	
Kuwait	Al Ahmadi	Minor Basilica of Our Lady of Arabia	2026	
Malaysia	Bukit Mertajam	Church of Saint Anne	2019	
Palestine	Bethlehem	Basilica of the Nativity	Immemorial	
Palestine	Jerusalem Governorate	St Cleophas Church	1919	
Philippines	Agoo	Basilica Minore of Our Lady of Charity	1982	
Philippines	Angeles City	Basilica of Our Lady of the Most Holy Rosary	2026	
Philippines	Badoc	Basilica of Saint John the Baptist	2018	
Philippines	Batangas City	Basilica of the Immaculate Conception	1948	
Philippines	Cebu City	Basilica del Santo Niño	1965	
Philippines	Gapan	Basilica of the National Shrine of La Virgen Divina Pastora	2024	
Philippines	Majayjay	Basilica of Saint Gregory the Great	2025	
Philippines	Malabon	Basilica of Saint Bartholomew	2026	
Philippines	Malolos	Cathedral-Basilica of Our Lady of the Immaculate Conception	1999	
Philippines	Manaoag	Basilica of Our Lady of the Rosary of Manaoag	2014	
Philippines	Manila	San Sebastian Church	1890	
Philippines	Manila	Metropolitan Cathedral-Basilica of the Immaculate Conception	1981	
Philippines	Manila	Basilica of the National Shrine of Jesus Nazareno (Quiapo Church)	1987	
Philippines	Manila	Basilica of the National Shrine of San Lorenzo Ruiz (Binondo Church)	1992	
Philippines	Manila	Basilica of Our Lady of the Pillar (Santa Cruz Church)	2025	
Philippines	Manila	Basilica and Archdiocesan Shrine of Santo Niño de Tondo	2026	
Philippines	Marikina	Basilica and Diocesan Shrine of Saint Paul of the Cross	2025	
Philippines	Naga City	Basilica of the National Shrine of Our Lady of Peñafrancia	1985	
Philippines	Orani	Basilica of Our Lady of the Rosary of Orani	2019	
Philippines	Parañaque	Basilica of the National Shrine of Mary Help of Christians	2025	
Philippines	Piat	Basilica of Our Lady of Piat	1999	
Philippines	Quezon City	Basilica of the National Shrine of Our Lady of Mount Carmel	2018	
Philippines	Quezon City	Basilica of St Pedro Bautista	2020	
Philippines	San Carlos	Basilica of St Dominic de Guzman	2022	
Philippines	Santa Maria, Bulacan	Basilica of La Purisima Concepcion	2021	
Philippines	Santa Maria, Ilocos Sur	Basilica Shrine of Our Lady of the Assumption	2024	
Philippines	Sinait	Basilica of St Nicholas of Tolentino	2021	
Philippines	Taal	Basilica of St Martin of Tours	1954	
Philippines	Taguig	Basilica of St Anne	2022	
Philippines	Tayabas City	Basilica of St Michael the Archangel	1988	
Philippines	Taytay	Basilica of St John the Baptist	2024	
South Korea	Mokpo	Basilica of the Exaltation of the Holy Cross of Our Lord Jesus Christ	2021	
Sri Lanka	Tewatta	Basilica of Our Lady of Lanka	1973	
Taiwan	Kaohsiung	Holy Rosary Basilica Cathedral	1995	
Taiwan	Pingtung	Basilica of the Immaculate Conception, Wanchin	1984	
Vietnam	Hanoi	Basilica of the Immaculate Conception (Sở Kiện)	2010	
Vietnam	Ho Chi Minh City	Cathedral Basilica of the Immaculate Conception	1959	
Vietnam	La Vang	"Old" Basilica of Our Lady of La Vang (Destroyed in 1972)	1961	
Vietnam	Nam Định	Basilica of Immaculate Conception, Phu Nhai	2008	

== Basilicas in Africa ==
Country	City/Municipality	Basilica	Year of creation	Image
Algeria	Algiers	Basilica of Our Lady of Africa	1875	
Algeria	Annaba	Basilica of St Augustine	1914	
Benin	Ouidah	Basilica of the Immaculate Conception	1989	
Burkina Faso	Yagma	Basilica of Our Lady of Yagma	2013	
Burundi	Mugera	Basilica of St. Anthony of Padua	2025	
Cameroon	Yaoundé	Basilica of Mary Queen of the Apostles	2006	
Côte d'Ivoire	Yamoussoukro	Basilica of Our Lady of Peace	1990	
Democratic Republic of the Congo	Lubumbashi	Basilica of St Mary	2000	
Egypt	Cairo	Basilica of St Therese of the Child Jesus	1972	
Egypt	Cairo	Cathedral of Our Lady of Fatima	1993	
Equatorial Guinea	Mongomo	Basilica of the Immaculate Conception	2011	
Ghana	Elmina	St Joseph's Basilica	2007	
Ghana	Kumasi	St Peter's Cathedral Basilica	2004	
Ghana	Nandom	Basilica of St Theresa of the Infant Jesus	2008	
Ghana	Navrongo	Cathedral Basilica of Our Lady of Seven Sorrows	2006	
Kenya	Nairobi	Cathedral Basilica of the Holy Family	1982	
Nigeria	Onitsha	Cathedral Basilica of the Most Holy Trinity	2007	
Rwanda	Kabgayi	Cathedral Basilica of Our Lady	1992	
Senegal	Popenguine	Basilica of Our Lady of Deliverance	1991	
Tunisia	Carthage	Cathedral of St Louis	1918	
Uganda	Kampala	Basilica of the Uganda Martyrs, Munyonyo	2019	
Uganda	Lodonga	Basilica of the Blessed Virgin Mary	1961	
Uganda	Namugongo	Basilica of the Uganda Martyrs, Namugongo	1993	
Zimbabwe	Bulawayo	Cathedral Basilica of the Immaculate Conception	2013	

== Basilicas in North and Central America and the Caribbean ==
Country	Municipality	Basilica	Year of designation	Image
Canada	Alexandra, ON	St Finnan's Basilica	2021	
Canada	Charlottetown, PE	Cathedral Basilica of St Dunstan	1929	
Canada	Drummondville, QC	Basilica of St. Frederick	2015	
Canada	Edmonton, AB	St Joseph's Cathedral Basilica	1984	
Canada	Guelph, ON	Basilica of Our Lady Immaculate	2014	
Canada	Halifax, NS	St Mary's Cathedral Basilica	1950	
Canada	Hamilton, ON	Cathedral Basilica of Christ the King	2013	
Canada	Labrador City, NL	Basilica of our Lady of Perpetual Help	2007	
Canada	London, ON	St Peter's Cathedral Basilica	1961	
Canada	Miramichi, NB	Basilica of St Michael the Archangel	1989	
Canada	Montreal, QC	Basilica Cathedral of Mary Queen of the World and St James	1919	
Canada	Montreal, QC	Oratory of St Joseph of Mont-Royal	1954	
Canada	Montreal, QC	Our Lady of Montreal Basilica	1982	
Canada	Montreal, QC	St Patrick's Basilica	1988	
Canada	Moosonee, ON	Christ the King Basilica	2021	
Canada	Ottawa, ON	Cathedral Basilica of Our Lady	1879	
Canada	Ottawa, ON	St Patrick's Basilica	1995	
Canada	Quebec City, QC	Cathedral Basilica of Our Lady of Quebec	1874	
Canada	Sainte-Anne-de-Beaupré, QC	Basilica of Sainte-Anne-de-Beaupré	1887	
Canada	St John's, NL	Basilica-Cathedral of St John the Baptist	1955	
Canada	Salaberry-de-Valleyfield, QC	Cathedral Basilica of St Cecilia	1991	
Canada	Sherbrooke, QC	Cathedral Basilica of St Michael	1959	
Canada	Toronto, ON	St Paul's Basilica	1999	
Canada	Toronto, ON	St Michael's Cathedral Basilica	2016	
Canada	Trois-Rivières, QC	Our Lady of the Cape Basilica, Cap-de-la-Madeleine	1964	
Canada	Varennes, QC	St Anne of Varennes Basilica	1993	
Canada	Winnipeg, MB	Cathedral Basilica of St Boniface	1949	
Costa Rica	Cartago	Our Lady of the Angels Basilica	1935	
Costa Rica	El Tejar	Basilica of the Immaculate Conception	1985	
Cuba	Camagüey	Our Lady of Candelaria Cathedral	2014	
Cuba	Havana	Basilica of Our Lady of Charity	2011	
Cuba	Santiago de Cuba	Cathedral Basilica of Our Lady of the Assumption	1882	
Cuba	Santiago de Cuba	National Shrine Basilica of Our Lady of Charity	1977	
Curaçao	Willemstad	Basilica of St Anne	1974	
Dominican Republic	Higüey	Cathedral Basilica of Our Lady of Altagracia	1970	
Dominican Republic	Santo Domingo	Metropolitan Cathedral Basilica of St Mary of the Incarnation (Primatial Cathedral of the Americas)	1920	
El Salvador	San Miguel	Cathedral Basilica of the Queen of Peace	1966	
El Salvador	San Salvador	Metropolitan Cathedral Basilica of the Holy Saviour	1843	
El Salvador	San Salvador	Basilica of Our Lady of Guadalupe	1960	
El Salvador	San Vicente	Basilica of Our Lady of the Pillar	1962	
Guadeloupe	Basse-Terre	Cathedral Basilica of Our Lady of Guadeloupe	1877	
Guatemala	Esquipulas	Basilica of the Black Christ of Esquipulas	1961	
Guatemala	Guatemala City	Basilica of Our Lady of the Rosary	1969	
Honduras	Tegucigalpa	Basilica of Our Lady of Suyapa	2015	
Mexico	Aguascalientes	Cathedral Basilica of Our Lady of the Assumption	1949	
Mexico	Apizaco	Basilica of the Virgin of Mercy	1963	
Mexico	Chignahuapan	Basilica of the Immaculate Conception	1998	
Mexico	Ciudad Victoria	Basilica of Our Lady of Refuge	1990	
Mexico	Colima	Cathedral Basilica of Our Lady of Guadalupe	1998	
Mexico	Culiacán	Cathedral Basilica of Our Lady of the Rosary	1974	
Mexico	Durango	Cathedral Basilica of Our Lady	1957	
Mexico	El Pueblito	Basilica Shrine of Our Lady of El Pueblito	2024	
Mexico	Guadalajara	Cathedral Basilica of the Assumption	1938	
Mexico	Guanajuato	Collegiate Basilica of Our Lady of Guanajuato	1957	
Mexico	Huamantla	Basilica of Our Lady of Charity	1978	
Mexico	León	Cathedral Basilica of Our Lady of the Light	1920	
Mexico	Mazatlán	Cathedral Basilica of the Immaculate Conception	1941	
Mexico	Mexico City	"Old" Basilica of Our Lady of Guadalupe	1904	
Mexico	Mexico City	Basilica of Our Lady of Guadalupe	1976	
Mexico	Mexico City	Basilica of St Joseph and Our Lady of the Sacred Heart	1993	
Mexico	Monterrey	Basilica of Our Lady of the Oak	1973	
Mexico	Monterrey	Basilica of Our Lady of Guadalupe	1983	
Mexico	Monterrey	Basilica of the Conception	1989	
Mexico	Naucalpan	Basilica of Our Lady of the Remedies	1998	
Mexico	Oaxaca	Basilica of Our Lady of the Solitude	1959	
Mexico	Ocotlán	Basilica of Our Lady of Ocotlán	1957	
Mexico	Pachuca	Basilica of Our Lady of Guadalupe	2004	
Mexico	Pátzcuaro	Basilica of Our Lady of the Salutation	1924	
Mexico	San Juan de los Lagos	Cathedral Basilica of Our Lady of San Juan de los Lagos	1947	
Mexico	San Luis Potosí	Basilica Shrine of Our Lady of Guadalupe	1991	
Mexico	Talpa de Allende	Basilica of Our Lady of the Rosary of Talpa	1946	
Mexico	Xalapa	Basilica of Our Lady of Guadalupe	2013	
Mexico	Zacatecas	Cathedral Basilica of Our Lady of the Assumption	1959	
Mexico	Zapopan	Basilica of Our Lady of Zapopan	1939	
Nicaragua	Diriamba	Basilica of St Sebastian	1964	
Nicaragua	El Viejo	National Shrine Basilica of Our Lady of the Immaculate Conception	1995	
Panama	Atalaya	Basilica of Jesus of Nazareth	1964	
Panama	Panama City	Basilica of Don Bosco, Calidonia	1988	
Panama	Panama City	Cathedral Basilica of St Mary	2014	
Puerto Rico	Hormigueros	Shrine Basilica of Our Lady of Montserrat	1998	
Puerto Rico	San Juan	Metropolitan Cathedral Basilica of St John the Baptist of Puerto Rico	1978	
Saint Lucia	Castries	Cathedral Basilica of the Immaculate Conception	1999	
Trinidad and Tobago	Port of Spain	Cathedral Basilica of the Immaculate Conception	1851	
United States	Alameda, CA	St Joseph's Basilica	1972	
United States	Alexandria, VA	Basilica of St Mary	2018	
United States	Asheville, NC	Basilica of St Lawrence	1993	
United States	Atlanta, GA	Basilica of the Sacred Heart of Jesus	2010	
United States	Baltimore, MD	Basilica of the National Shrine of the Assumption of the Blessed Virgin Mary	1937	
United States	Bardstown, KY	Basilica of St Joseph Proto-Cathedral	2001	
United States	Beaumont, TX	St Anthony Cathedral Basilica	2006	
United States	Belmont, NC	Abbey Basilica of Our Lady Help of Christians (Belmont Abbey)	1998	
United States	Boston, MA	Basilica and Shrine of Our Lady of Perpetual Help	1954	
United States	Canton, OH	Basilica of St John the Baptist	2012	
United States	Carey, OH	Basilica and National Shrine of Our Lady of Consolation	1971	
United States	Carmel-by-the-Sea, CA	Basilica of Mission San Carlos Borromeo de Carmelo (Carmel Mission)	1960	
United States	Charleston, WV	Basilica of the Co-Cathedral of the Sacred Heart	2009	
United States	Chattanooga, TN	Basilica of Saints Peter and Paul	2011	
United States	Chicago, IL	Our Lady of Sorrows Basilica	1956	
United States	Chicago, IL	Queen of All Saints Basilica	1962	
United States	Chicago, IL	Basilica of St Hyacinth	2003	
United States	Chicopee, MA	Basilica of St Stanislaus	1991	
United States	Cincinnati, OH	Cathedral Basilica of Saint Peter in Chains	2020	
United States	Columbia, SC	Basilica of St Peter	2018	
United States	Conewago, PA	Basilica of the Sacred Heart of Jesus	1962	
United States	Covington, KY	Cathedral Basilica of the Assumption	1953	
United States	Danville, PA	Basilica of Saints Cyril and Methodius	1989	
United States	Daytona Beach, FL	Basilica of St Paul	2006	
United States	Denver, CO	Cathedral Basilica of the Immaculate Conception	1979	
United States	Des Moines, IA	Basilica of St John	1989	
United States	Detroit, MI	Basilica of Sainte Anne de Détroit	2020	
United States	Dyersville, IA	Basilica of St Francis Xavier	1957	
United States	Emmitsburg, MD	Basilica of the National Shrine of St Elizabeth Ann Seton	1991	
United States	Galveston, TX	St Mary's Cathedral Basilica	1979	
United States	Grand Rapids, MI	Basilica of St Adalbert	1979	
United States	Honolulu, HI	Cathedral Basilica of Our Lady of Peace	2014	
United States	Hubertus, WI	Basilica of the National Shrine of Mary, Help of Christians at Holy Hill	2006	
United States	Jacksonville, FL	Basilica of the Immaculate Conception	2013	
United States	Jamestown, ND	St James Basilica	1988	
United States	Key West, FL	Basilica of St Mary Star of the Sea	2012	
United States	Lackawanna, NY	Our Lady of Victory National Shrine and Basilica	1926	
United States	Lancaster, OH	Basilica of St Mary of the Assumption	2022	
United States	Latrobe, PA	St Vincent Archabbey Basilica	1955	
United States	Lewiston, ME	Basilica of Saints Peter and Paul	2004	
United States	Lewiston, NY	Basilica of the National Shrine of Our Lady of Fatima	1975	
United States	Loretto, PA	Basilica of St Michael the Archangel	1996	
United States	Marietta, OH	Basilica of St Mary of the Assumption	2013	
United States	Mesilla, NM	Basilica of San Albino	2008	
United States	Milwaukee, WI	Basilica of St Josaphat	1929	
United States	Minneapolis, MN	Basilica of St Mary	1926	
United States	Mobile, AL	Cathedral Basilica of the Immaculate Conception	1962	
United States	Natchez, MS	St Mary Basilica	1998	
United States	Natchitoches, LA	Basilica of the Immaculate Conception	2009	
United States	Newark, NJ	Cathedral Basilica of the Sacred Heart	1995	
United States	New Haven, KY	Basilica of the Blessed Virgin of Gethsemani, Abbey of Gethsemani	1949	
United States	New Orleans, LA	Cathedral Basilica of St Louis, King of France	1964	
United States	New Orleans, LA	Basilica of St Stephen	2022	
United States	New York, NY	Basilica of Regina Pacis	2012	
United States	New York, NY	Basilica of Our Lady of Perpetual Help	1969	
United States	New York, NY	Cathedral Basilica of St James	1982	
United States	New York, NY	St Patrick's Old Cathedral	2010	
United States	Nodaway County, MO	Basilica of the Immaculate Conception, Conception Abbey	1940	
United States	Norfolk, VA	Basilica of St Mary of the Immaculate Conception	1991	
United States	North Jackson, OH	Basilica and National Shrine of Our Lady of Lebanon	2014	
United States	Notre Dame, IN	Basilica of the Sacred Heart	1991	
United States	Olean, NY	St Mary of the Angels Basilica	2017	
United States	Orlando, FL	Basilica of the National Shrine of Mary, Queen of the Universe	2009	
United States	Palm Beach, FL	Basilica of Saint Edward	2025	
United States	Pensacola, FL	Basilica of St Michael the Archangel	2012	
United States	Philadelphia, PA	Basilica Shrine of Our Lady of the Miraculous Medal	2023	
United States	Philadelphia, PA	Cathedral Basilica of Saints Peter and Paul	1976	
United States	Phoenix, AZ	St Mary's Basilica	1985	
United States	Roanoke, VA	Basilica of St Andrew	2023	
United States	Royal Oak, MI	National Shrine of the Little Flower Basilica	2015	
United States	St Augustine, FL	Cathedral Basilica of St Augustine	1976	
United States	St Louis, MO	Basilica of St Louis, King of France (Old Cathedral)	1961	
United States	St Louis, MO	Cathedral Basilica of St Louis	1997	
United States	San Antonio, TX	Basilica of the National Shrine of the Little Flower	1998	
United States	San Diego, CA	Basilica of Mission San Diego de Alcalá	1975	
United States	San Francisco, CA	Basilica of Mission San Francisco de Asís (Mission Dolores)	1952	
United States	San Jose, CA	Cathedral Basilica of St Joseph	1997	
United States	San Juan, TX	Basilica of the National Shrine of Our Lady of San Juan del Valle	1954	
United States	San Juan Capistrano, CA	Mission Basilica San Juan Capistrano	2000	
United States	Santa Fe, NM	Cathedral Basilica of St Francis of Assisi	2005	
United States	Savannah, GA	Cathedral Basilica of St John the Baptist	2020	
United States	Scranton, PA	Basilica of the National Shrine of St Ann	1997	
United States	Southampton, NY	Basilica of the Sacred Hearts of Jesus and Mary	2012	
United States	Stamford, CT	Basilica of Saint John the Evangelist	2009	
United States	Syracuse, NY	Basilica of the Sacred Heart of Jesus	1998	
United States	Ventura, CA	Mission Basilica San Buenaventura	2020	
United States	Victoria, KS	Basilica of St Fidelis	2014	
United States	Vincennes, IN	Basilica of St Francis Xavier	1970	
United States	Washington, DC	Basilica of the National Shrine of the Immaculate Conception	1990	
United States	Waterbury, CT	Basilica of the Immaculate Conception	2008	
United States	Webster, MA	St Joseph Basilica	1998	
United States	Wilmington, NC	Basilica Shrine of St Mary	2013	
United States	Winona, MN	Basilica of Saint Stanislaus Kostka	2011	
United States	Youngstown, OH	Basilica of Our Lady of Mount Carmel	2014	

== Basilicas in South America ==
Country	Municipality	Basilica	Year of creation	Image
Argentina	Buenos Aires	Basilica of Our Lady of Succour	1898	
Argentina	Buenos Aires	Basilica of Our Lady of the Rosary	1909	
Argentina	Buenos Aires	St Joseph of the Flowers Basilica	1911	
Argentina	Buenos Aires	Basilica of the Holy Sacrament	1916	
Argentina	Buenos Aires	Basilica of Our Lady of Mercy	1917	
Argentina	Buenos Aires	Basilica of St Francis, Convent of St Ursula and the 11,000 Virgins	1918	
Argentina	Buenos Aires	Basilica of Our Lady of Buenos Aires	1935	
Argentina	Buenos Aires	Our Lady of the Pillar Basilica	1936	
Argentina	Buenos Aires	Basilica of St Nicholas of Bari	1937	
Argentina	Buenos Aires	Basilica of the Sacred Heart of Jesus	1939	
Argentina	Buenos Aires	Basilica of the Holy Spirit	1939	
Argentina	Buenos Aires	Basilica of St Charles Borromeo and Mary Help of Christians	1941	
Argentina	Buenos Aires	Basilica of St Rose of Lima	1941	
Argentina	Buenos Aires	Basilica of St Anthony of Padua	1963	
Argentina	Buenos Aires	Basilica of Our Lady of Piety	2002	
Argentina	Concepción del Uruguay	Basilica of the Immaculate Conception of Uruguay	1980	
Argentina	Córdoba	Basilica of Santo Domingo, Shrine of Our Lady of the Rosary of the Miracle	1911	
Argentina	Córdoba	Basilica of Our Lady of Mercy	1926	
Argentina	Esperanza	Basilica of the Nativity of the Blessed Virgin	2005	
Argentina	Godoy Cruz	Basilica of St Vincent Ferrer	2023	
Argentina	Itatí	Our Lady of Itatí Basilica	1980	
Argentina	La Plata	Basilica of the Sacred Heart of Jesus	1966	
Argentina	La Plata	Basilica of St Ponciano	1997	
Argentina	La Rioja	Cathedral Basilica of St Nicholas of Bari	1955	
Argentina	Lomas de Zamora	Cathedral Basilica of Our Lady of Peace	1965	
Argentina	Luján	Our Lady of Luján National Basilica	1930	
Argentina	Luján de Cuyo	Basilica of Our Lady of Luján	2014	
Argentina	Mar del Plata	Cathedral Basilica of SS Peter and Cecilia	1924	
Argentina	Mendoza	Basilica of St Francis	1926	
Argentina	Mendoza	Basilica of Our Lady of the Rosary	1962	
Argentina	Mercedes	Cathedral Basilica of Our Lady of Mercies	1949	
Argentina	Morón	Cathedral Basilica of the Immaculate Conception of the Good Journey	1962	
Argentina	Nogoyá	Basilica of Our Lady of Carmel	1967	
Argentina	Rosario	Cathedral Basilica of Our Lady of the Rosary	1964	
Argentina	Rosario	Basilica of St Joseph	1998	
Argentina	Rosario	Basilica of Our Lady of Lourdes	2015	
Argentina	Salta	Cathedral Shrine of Our Lord and the Virgin of the Miracle	1938	
Argentina	Salta	Basilica of St James of Alcalá, St Francis Convent	1997	
Argentina	Sampacho	Basilica of Our Lady of Consolation	2024	
Argentina	San Fernando del Valle de Catamarca	Cathedral Basilica of Our Lady of the Valley	1941	
Argentina	San Juan	Basilica of the Stranded	2008	
Argentina	San Pedro	Basilica of Our Lady of Help	2024	
Argentina	San Salvador de Jujuy	Cathedral Basilica of the Holy Saviour of Jujuy	1973	
Argentina	Santa Fe	Basilica of Our Lady of Guadalupe	1953	
Argentina	Santa Fe	Basilica of Our Lady of Carmel	1986	
Argentina	Santiago del Estero	Our Lady of Carmel Cathedral Basilica	1971	
Argentina	Tucumán	Basilica of the Holy Rosary, Convent of St Dominic	1941	
Argentina	Victoria	Basilica of Our Lady of Aranzazu	2020	
Argentina	Villa del Rosario	Basilica and Shrine of Our Lady of the Rosary	1955	
Bolivia	Copacabana	Basilica of the Virgin of Candelaria	1940	
Bolivia	La Paz	Basilica of St Francis	1948	
Bolivia	La Paz	Cathedral Basilica of Our Lady of Peace	1948	
Bolivia	La Paz	Basilica of Mary Help of Christians	2000	
Bolivia	Oruro	Basilica Shrine of Nuestra Señora del Socavón	2025	
Bolivia	Potosí	Cathedral Basilica of Our Lady of Peace	1938	
Bolivia	Santa Cruz	Metropolitan Cathedral Basilica of St Lawrence	1980	
Bolivia	Sucre	Basilica Cathedral of Our Lady of Guadalupe	1925	
Bolivia	Sucre	Basilica of St Francis	1999	
Brazil	Acari	Basilica of Our Lady of Guidance	2021	
Brazil	Americana	Shrine Basilica of St. Anthony of Padua	2014	
Brazil	Aparecida	"Old" Basilica of Our Lady of Aparecida	1909	
Brazil	Aparecida	Cathedral Basilica of the National Shrine of Our Lady Aparecida	1981	
Brazil	Apucarana	Cathedral Basilica of Our Lady of Lourdes	2024	
Brazil	Araraquara	Basilica of St Benedict	2023	
Brazil	Assis	St Vincent de Paul Basilica	1998	
Brazil	Barbacena	St Joseph the Worker Basilica	1965	
Brazil	Belém	Basilica of Our Lady of Nazareth of Exile	1923	
Brazil	Belo Horizonte	Our Lady of Lourdes Basilica	1958	
Brazil	Belo Horizonte	Basilica of St Jean Marie Vianney	1986	
Brazil	Boa Esperança	Our Lady of Pain Basilica	1999	
Brazil	Borba	Prelatial Cathedral Basilica of St Anthony of Padua	2003	
Brazil	Borda da Mata	Basilica of Our Lady of Carmel	2005	
Brazil	Botucatu	Metropolitan Cathedral Basilica of St Ann	1965	
Brazil	Brasília	Basilica of Saint Francis of Assisi	2022	
Brazil	Caconde	Basilica Shrine of Our Lady of the Immaculate Conception	2008	
Brazil	Caeté	Basilica of Our Lady of Piety	2017	
Brazil	Caeté	State Basilica of Pilgrimages	2017	
Brazil	Caieiras	Basilica of Our Lady of the Rosary	2012	
Brazil	Campinas	Our Lady of Carmel Basilica	1974	
Brazil	Campos dos Goytacazes	Cathedral Basilica of the Most Holy Saviour	1965	
Brazil	Canindé	St Francis of the Chagas Basilica	1925	
Brazil	Carutapera	Basilica of St Sebastian	2021	
Brazil	Conceição do Rio Verde	Our Lady of the Conception Basilica	1974	
Brazil	Congonhas	Basilica of the Good Lord Jesus of Matosinhos	1957	
Brazil	Conselheiro Lafaiete	Sacred Heart of Jesus Basilica	2003	
Brazil	Cruzeiro	Basilica of the Immaculate Conception	2025	
Brazil	Cuiabá	Metropolitan Cathedral Basilica of the Good Lord Jesus	1974	
Brazil	Curitiba	Metropolitan Cathedral Basilica of Our Lady of Light	1993	
Brazil	Curvelo	St Gerard Majella Basilica	1966	
Brazil	Diamantina	Sacred Heart of Jesus Basilica	1920	
Brazil	Embu das Artes	Basilica of Our Lady of the Rosary of Fatima	2014	
Brazil	Goiânia	Basilica of the Sanctuary of Our Lady of Perpetual Help	2015	
Brazil	Goiânia	Basilica of the Holy Family	2020	
Brazil	Içara	Basilica of the Most Sacred Heart of Jesus	2024	
Brazil	Iguape	Our Lady of the Snows Basilica, Shrine of the Good Lord Jesus of Iguape	1962	
Brazil	Itatiba	Our Lady of Bethlehem Basilica	1991	
Brazil	João Pessoa	Metropolitan Cathedral Basilica of Our Lady of the Snows	1997	
Brazil	Liberdade	Basilica of Bom Jesus do Livramento	2018	
Brazil	Mariana	Metropolitan Cathedral Basilica of Our Lady of the Assumption	1963	
Brazil	Marília	Cathedral Basilica of St Benedict	1975	
Brazil	Maringá	Cathedral Basilica of Our Lady of Glory	1982	
Brazil	Monte Alto	Basilica of Bom Jesus	2022	
Brazil	Niterói	Our Lady Help of Christians Basilica	1950	
Brazil	Novo Hamburgo	Cathedral Basilica of St Louis Gonzaga	1991	
Brazil	Olinda	Abbatial Basilica of the Monastery of St Benedict	1998	
Brazil	Piedade	Basilica of Nossa Senhora da Piedade	2024	
Brazil	Poços de Caldas	Our Lady of Health Basilica	1948	
Brazil	Porto Alegre	Basilica of Our Lady of Sorrows	2022	
Brazil	Recife	Basilica of Our Lady of Carmel	1920	
Brazil	Recife	Our Lady of the Rock Basilica	1949	
Brazil	Ribeirão Preto	Basilica of St Anthony, Campos Elíseos	2019	
Brazil	Rio de Janeiro	St Teresa of the Child Jesus Basilica	1927	
Brazil	Rio de Janeiro	Our Lady of Lourdes Basilica	1959	
Brazil	Rio de Janeiro	Immaculate Heart of Mary Basilica	1963	
Brazil	Rio de Janeiro	Basilica of the Immaculate Conception	2002	
Brazil	Rio de Janeiro	Basilica Sanctuary of St Sebastian (Capuchins)	2015	
Brazil	Rio de Janeiro	Basilica of Our Lady of Rock of France	2016	
Brazil	Rio de Janeiro	São João Batista da Lagoa, Botafogo	2024	
Brazil	Rio de Janeiro	São Francisco Xavier, Tijuca	2025	
Brazil	Romaria	Basilica of Our Lady of the Abbey	2023	
Brazil	Sacramento	Basilica of the Most Blessed Sacrament	2014	
Brazil	Salvador	Primatial Cathedral Basilica of the Transfiguration	1922	
Brazil	Salvador	Basilica of Our Lord of Bonfim	1926	
Brazil	Salvador	Our Lady of the Conception of Praia Basilica	1946	
Brazil	Salvador	Basilica of St Sebastian	1982	
Brazil	Santa Maria	Basilica Shrine of Our Lady Mediatrix	1987	
Brazil	Santo Amaro	Basilica of Our Lady of Purification	2024	
Brazil	Santos	St Anthony of Embaré Basilica	1952	
Brazil	Santos	Basilica of Our Lady of the Rosary of Pompei	2026	
Brazil	São João del Rei	Cathedral Basilica of Our Lady of the Pillar	1964	
Brazil	São José do Rio Preto	Our Lady of Apparition Basilica	1954	
Brazil	São Lourenço	Basilica of St Lawrence the Martyr	2016	
Brazil	São Miguel Arcanjo	Basilica of St Michael the Archangel	2018	
Brazil	São Paulo	Basilica of Our Lady of the Assumption, Monastery of St Benedict	1922	
Brazil	São Paulo	Basilica of Our Lady of Carmel	1950	
Brazil	São Paulo	Basilica of the Holy Sacrament	1958	
Brazil	São Paulo	Our Lady of the Rock Basilica	1985	
Brazil	São Paulo	Basilica of St Anne	2020	
Brazil	Tatuí	Basilica of Our Lady of the Conception	2021	
Brazil	Tomazina	Basilica Shrine of Our Lady of the Conception and Saint Innocent, martyr	2026	
Brazil	Tremembé	Basilica of the Good Lord Jesus	1974	
Brazil	Trindade	Basilica of the Eternal Divine Father	2006	
Brazil	Uberaba	Basilica of Our Lady of the Abbey	2020	
Brazil	Vitória	Basilica Shrine of St Anthony	2008	
Chile	Andacollo	Basilica Shrine of Our Lady of Andacollo	1998	
Chile	Antofagasta	Basilica of the Heart of Mary	1999	
Chile	Maipú	Basilica of Carmel, National Shrine of Maipú	1987	
Chile	Rengo	Basilica of St Ann	1997	
Chile	Santiago	Basilica of Our Lady of Mercy	1922	
Chile	Santiago	Basilica of Our Lady of Perpetual Succour	1925	
Chile	Santiago	Basilica of the Heart of Mary	1929	
Chile	Santiago	Basilica of the Saviour	1937	
Chile	Santiago	Basilica of Lourdes	1992	
Colombia	Bogotá	Primatial Cathedral Basilica of the Immaculate Conception	1907	
Colombia	Bogotá	Basilica of the Lord of Monserrate	1956	
Colombia	Bogotá	Basilica of the Sacred Heart of Jesus	1964	
Colombia	Bogotá	Basilica of Our Lady of Lourdes	2015	
Colombia	Bogotá	Basilica of Our Lady of Chiquinquirá	2023	
Colombia	Buga	Basilica of Our Lady of Miracles	1937	
Colombia	Cáqueza	Basilica of the Immaculate Conception	2016	
Colombia	Cartagena	Metropolitan Cathedral Basilica of St Catherine of Alexandria	1953	
Colombia	Cartago	Basilica of Our Lady of Poverty	2025	
Colombia	Chinchiná	Basilica of Our Lady of Mercedes	2009	
Colombia	Chiquinquirá	Basilica of Our Lady of the Rosary	1927	
Colombia	Cúcuta	Basilica of Our Lady of the Rosary of Chiquinquira	2019	
Colombia	El Santuario	Basilica of St Judas Thaddaeus	2017	
Colombia	Firavitoba	Basilica of Our Lady of the Snows	2019	
Colombia	Frontino	Basilica of Our Lady of Carmel, Frontino	2010	
Colombia	Girón	Basilica of St John the Baptist	1998	
Colombia	Guasca	Basilica of St Hyacinth	2018	
Colombia	Ipiales	Shrine Basilica of Our Lady of Las Lajas	1954	
Colombia	Jardín	Basilica of the Immaculate Conception	2003	
Colombia	La Ceja	Basilica of Our Lady of Carmen	2003	
Colombia	La Estrella	Basilica of Our Lady of the Rosary of Chiquinquirá	1986	
Colombia	La Unión	Basilica of Our Lady of the Rosary	2024	
Colombia	Manizales	Cathedral Basilica of Our Lady of the Rosary	1951	
Colombia	Manizales	Basilica of the Immaculate Conception	2015	
Colombia	Manzanares	Basilica of Saint Anthony of Padua	2015	
Colombia	Medellín	Metropolitan Cathedral Basilica of the Immaculate Conception	1948	
Colombia	Medellín	Basilica of Our Lady of Candelaria	1970	
Colombia	Mompós	Basilica of St Augustine	2012	
Colombia	Monguí	Basilica of Mongui	1966	
Colombia	Moniquirá	Basilica of Our Lady of the Rosary	2011	
Colombia	Popayán	Cathedral Basilica of Our Lady of the Assumption	1953	
Colombia	Quimbaya	Basilica of Jesus, Mary, and Joseph	2026	
Colombia	Salamina	Basilica of the Immaculate Conception	2012	
Colombia	San Benito Abad	Basilica of the Lord of Miracles	1962	
Colombia	San Pedro	Basilica of Our Lord of Miracles	1981	
Colombia	Santa Fe de Antioquia	Cathedral Basilica of the Immaculate Conception	1941	
Colombia	Santa Marta	Cathedral Basilica of St Martha	1930	
Colombia	Santa Rosa de Cabal	Basilica of Our Lady of Victories	2004	
Colombia	Santa Rosa de Osos	Basilica of Our Lady of Mercies	1972	
Colombia	Sevilla	Basilica of St Louis Gonzaga	2015	
Colombia	Socorro	Basilica of Our Lady of Help	2015	
Colombia	Sopetrán	Basilica of Our Lady of the Assumption	2014	
Colombia	Tunja	Cathedral Basilica of St James	1980	
Colombia	Ubaté	Basilica of the Holy Christ of Ubaté	1992	
Colombia	Yarumal	Basilica of Our Lady of Mercy	1999	
Ecuador	Ambato	Basilica of Our Lady of the Elevation	1961	
Ecuador	Cuenca	Basilica of Perpetual Help	1966	
Ecuador	Cuenca	Basilica of the Holy Trinity	2009	
Ecuador	El Cisne	National Shrine of Our Lady of El Cisne	1980	
Ecuador	El Quinche	National Shrine of Our Lady of the Presentation of El Quinche	1959	
Ecuador	Guayaquil	Basilica of Our Lady of Mercy	1962	
Ecuador	Ibarra	Basilica of Our Lady of Mercy	1964	
Ecuador	Montecristi	Basilica of the Holy Virgin of Montserrat	1988	
Ecuador	Quito	Basilica of Our Lady of Mercy	1920	
Ecuador	Quito	Basilica of St Francis	1965	
Ecuador	Quito	Basilica of the Sacred Heart of Jesus	1991	
Ecuador	Yaguachi	Basilica of St Hyacinth	1980	
Paraguay	Caacupé	Cathedral Basilica of Our Lady of Miracles	2015	
Paraguay	Pilar	Basilica of Our Lady of the Pillar	1979	
Peru	Arequipa	Cathedral Basilica of St Mary	1940	
Peru	Ayacucho	Cathedral Basilica of St Mary	1960	
Peru	Carmen de la Legua Reynoso	Basilica of Our Lady of Mount Carmel of La Legua	2014	
Peru	Cusco	Cathedral Basilica of the Virgin of the Assumption	1928	
Peru	Cusco	Basilica of Our Lady of Mercies	1946	
Peru	Lima	Basilica Cathedral of Lima	1921	
Peru	Lima	Basilica of Our Lady of Mercy	1924	
Peru	Lima	Basilica of Our Lady of the Rosary	1929	
Peru	Lima	Shrine Basilica of Mary Help of Christians, Breña	1962	
Peru	Lima	Basilica of Saint Francis	1963	
Peru	Lima	Basilica of Saint Rosa of Lima	1993	
Peru	Puno	Cathedral Basilica of San Carlos Borromeo	1963	
Peru	Trujillo	Cathedral Basilica of Santa María	1967	
Suriname	Paramaribo	Cathedral Basilica of Saint Peter and Paul	2014	
Uruguay	Colonia del Sacramento	Basilica of the Holy Sacrament	1997	
Uruguay	Florida	Cathedral Basilica of Our Lady of Lujan	1963	
Uruguay	Paysandú	Basilica of Our Lady of the Rosary and St Benedict of Palermo	1949	
Uruguay	Salto	Cathedral Basilica of St John the Baptist	1997	
Uruguay	San José de Mayo	Cathedral Basilica of St Joseph	1957	
Venezuela	Barquisimeto	Basilica of the Holy Christ of Grace	1993	
Venezuela	Campo Elías	Basilica and Diocesan Shrine of St Bonaventure, Ejido	2026	
Venezuela	Caracas	Shrine Basilica of the Holy Chapel	1926	
Venezuela	Caracas	Basilica of St Peter the Apostle, Los Chaguaramos	1962	
Venezuela	Caracas	Basilica of St Teresa	1974	
Venezuela	Cumaná	Basilica of St Agnes	2023	
Venezuela	Coro	Cathedral Basilica of St Ann	1977	
Venezuela	Coro	Basilica of Our Lady of Guadalupe	2008	
Venezuela	El Valle del Espíritu Santo	Basilica of Our Lady of the Valley	1995	
Venezuela	Guanare	Cathedral Basilica of Our Lady of Coromoto	1949	
Venezuela	Guanare	Basilica of the National Shrine of Our Lady of Coromoto	2006	
Venezuela	La Grita	Basilica of the Holy Spirit	1976	
Venezuela	Maracaibo	Basilica of Our Lady of Chiquinquirá	1920	
Venezuela	Mérida	Cathedral Basilica of the Immaculate Conception of Mérida	1991	
Venezuela	San Antonio del Táchira	Basilica of St Anthony of Padua	2017	
Venezuela	Táriba	Basilica of Our Lady of Consolation	1959	
Venezuela	Timotes	Basilica of St Lucy	2002	
Venezuela	Valencia	Cathedral Basilica of Our Lady of Succour	1960	

== Basilicas in Australia and Oceania ==
Country	Municipality	Basilica	Year of creation	Image
Australia	Boroondara	Our Lady of Victories Basilica, Camberwell	1996	
Australia	Fremantle	St Patrick's Basilica	1994	
Australia	Geelong	St Mary of the Angels Basilica	2004	
Australia	Melbourne	St Patrick's Cathedral	1974	
Australia	Sydney	St Mary's Cathedral	1932	
Guam	Hagåtña	Cathedral Basilica of the Sweet Name of Mary	1985	
Samoa	Leulumoega	Basilica Sancta Ana	2009	

== Basilicas in Europe ==
Country	Municipality	Basilica	Year of creation	Image
Albania	Shkodër	Basilica of Our Lady of Good Counsel	2024	
Andorra	Canillo	Our Lady of Meritxell's Sanctuary	2014	
Austria	Absam	St Michael's Basilica	1999	
Austria	Altenmarkt an der Triesting	Basilica of the Assumption, Kleinmariazell Abbey	2007	
Austria	Attnang-Puchheim	Maria Puchheim in Attnang Pilgrimage Church	1951	
Austria	Bergheim	Maria Plain Pilgrimage Basilica	1951	
Austria	Bildstein	Bildstein Pilgrimage Church	2018	
Austria	Enns	St Lawrence's Basilica	1970	
Austria	Frauenkirchen	Basilica of the Assumption	1990	
Austria	Geras	Basilica of Our Lady, Geras Abbey	1954	
Austria	Gratwein	Cistercian Abbey Basilica, Rein Abbey	1979	
Austria	Graz	Maria Trost Basilica	1999	
Austria	Güssing	Güssing Abbey Church	2013	
Austria	Hall in Tirol	Heart of Jesus Basilica, Hall Convent	1914	
Austria	Innsbruck	Basilica of Our Lady of the Immaculate Conception, Wilten Abbey	1957	
Austria	Klosterneuburg	Basilica of Our Lady, Klosterneuburg Monastery	1936	
Austria	Kramsach	Basilica of St Dominic, Mariathal	2008	
Austria	Lesachtal	Maria Luggau Basilica	1986	
Austria	Lilienfeld	Lilienfeld Abbey Church	1976	
Austria	Linz	Pöstlingberg Church (Maria Puchheim Pilgrimage Church)	1964	
Austria	Loretto	Maria Loretto Basilica	1997	
Austria	Maria Taferl	Maria Taferl Basilica	1947	
Austria	Mariapfarr	Mariapfarr Pilgrimage Basilica	2018	
Austria	Mariazell	Basilica of the Nativity of Mary	1907	
Austria	Mondsee	St Michael's Basilica	2005	
Austria	Rankweil	Basilica of Our Lady	1985	
Austria	Rosenburg-Mold	Maria Dreieichen Basilica	1957	
Austria	Sankt Andrä	Maria Loreto Pilgrimage Church	2014	
Austria	Sankt Florian	St Florian's Priory Basilica	1999	
Austria	Seckau	Cathedral and Abbey Church of the Assumption	1930	
Austria	Sonntagberg	Basilica of the Holy Trinity	1964	
Austria	Stams	Cistercian Abbey Basilica of Our Lady	1983	
Austria	Vienna	Dominican Church (Maria Rotunda Basilica)	1927	
Austria	Vienna	Piarist Church (Maria Treu Basilica)	1949	
Austria	Vienna	Scottish Church (Basilica of Our Lady of the Scots)	1958	
Austria	Weiz	Schmerzhafte Muttergottes am Weizberg	2017	
Austria	Wullersdorf	Basilica of the Nativity of Mary, Mariä Roggendorf	1988	
Belarus	Braslaw	Basilica of the Nativity of the Blessed Virgin Mary	2024	
Belarus	Budslau	Basilica of Our Lady of the Assumption	1993	
Belarus	Grodno	Cathedral Basilica of St Francis Xavier	1990	
Belarus	Pinsk	Cathedral Basilica of the Assumption	1996	
Belgium	Antwerp	Basilica of the Sacred Heart, Berchem	1878	
Belgium	Aubel	Abbatial Basilica of Our Lady of Val-Dieu	1946	
Belgium	Bruges	Cathedral of the Holy Saviour and St Donat	1921	
Belgium	Bruges	Basilica of the Holy Blood	1923	
Belgium	Bruges	Benedictine Abbatial Basilica of St Andrew, Zevenkerken	1952	
Belgium	Brussels	National Basilica of the Sacred Heart (Koekelberg Basilica)	1952	
Belgium	Chaudfontaine	Our Lady of Chèvremont Basilica, Vaux-sous-Chèvremont	1928	
Belgium	Chièvres	Basilica of Our Lady of Tongre	1951	
Belgium	Dendermonde	Abbatial Basilica of SS Peter and Paul	1938	
Belgium	Edegem	Basilica of Our Lady of Lourdes	2008	
Belgium	Estinnes	Abbatial Basilica of Our Lady of Good Hope, Vellereille-Les-Brayeux	1957	
Belgium	Florenville	Abbatial Basilica of Our Lady of Orval	1939	
Belgium	Ghent	Basilica of Our Lady of Lourdes, Oostakker	1924	
Belgium	Grimbergen	Abbatial Basilica of St Servatius	1998	
Belgium	Halle	St Martin's Basilica	1946	
Belgium	Hasselt	Virga Jesse Basilica	1998	
Belgium	Liège	St Martin's Basilica	1886	
Belgium	Mechelen	Basilica of Our Lady of Hanswijk	1987	
Belgium	Moorslede	Basilica of Our Lady of Dadizele	1882	
Belgium	Péruwelz	Our Lady of Good Succour Basilica	1910	
Belgium	Ronse	Basilica of St Hermes	2018	
Belgium	Saint-Hubert	Abbatial Basilica of SS Peter and Paul	1927	
Belgium	Scherpenheuvel-Zichem	Our Lady of Scherpenheuvel Basilica	1922	
Belgium	Sint-Truiden	Basilica of Our Lady, Kortenbos	1936	
Belgium	Tongeren	Basilica of Our Lady	1930	
Belgium	Vilvoorde	Basilica of Our Lady of Consolation	2006	
Belgium	Walcourt	Basilica of Saint Maternus	1950	
Belgium	Wavre	Basilica of Our Lady of Peace and Concord	1999	
Croatia	Đakovo	St Peter's Cathedral	1965	
Croatia	Karlovac	Basilica of the National Shrine of Saint Joseph	2025	
Croatia	Marija Bistrica	Basilica of Mary Mother of God of Bistrica	1923	
Croatia	Poreč	Cathedral of the Assumption of Mary (Euphrasian Basilica)	1931	
Croatia	Rijeka	Basilica of the Blessed Virgin Mary of Trsat	1930	
Croatia	Šibenik	Cathedral of St James	1895	
Croatia	Sisak	Basilica of St Quirinus of Sescia	2014	
Croatia	Sinj	Basilica of the Assumption	2024	
Croatia	Voćin	Basilica of Our Lady of Voćin	2022	
Croatia	Zadar	Cathedral of St Anastasia	1867	
Croatia	Zagreb	Basilica of the Sacred Heart of Jesus	1941	
Croatia	Zagreb	Basilica of St Anthony of Padua	2022	
Czech Republic	Brno	Basilica of the Assumption	1987	
Czech Republic	Česká Lípa	All Saints Basilica	1927	
Czech Republic	Chvalčov	Basilica of the Assumption of the Virgin Mary, Hostýn	1982	
Czech Republic	Frýdek-Místek	Basilica of the Visitation, Frýdek	2001	
Czech Republic	Jablonné v Podještědí	Basilica of St. Lawrence and St. Zdislava	1996	
Czech Republic	Jiříkov	Basilica of Our Lady Help of Christians, Filipov	1926	
Czech Republic	Krupka	Basilica of Our Lady of Sorrows, Bohosudov	1924	
Czech Republic	Olomouc	Basilica of the Visitation, Svatý Kopeček	1995	
Czech Republic	Prague	Basilica of St Margaret, Břevnov Monastery	1948	
Czech Republic	Prague	Basilica of St James	1974	
Czech Republic	Prague	Basilica of St Ludmila	2022	
Czech Republic	Prague	Basilica of the Assumption, Strahov Monastery	1991	
Czech Republic	Prague	Basilica of St Peter and St Paul, Vyšehrad	2003	
Czech Republic	Příbram	Basilica of the Assumption, Svatá Hora	1905	
Czech Republic	Velehrad	Basilica of the Assumption of Mary and Saints Cyril and Methodius	1928	
France	See List of basilicas in France			
Germany	See List of basilicas in Germany			
Greece	Athens	Cathedral Basilica of St Dionysius	1877	
Hungary	Andocs	Church of the Assumption	2021	
Hungary	Báta	Church of the Holy Blood	2020	
Hungary	Bodajk	Basilica of Mary Help of Christians	2023	
Hungary	Budapest	Co-Cathedral Basilica of St Stephen the King (St Stephen's Basilica)	1931	
Hungary	Budapest	Basilica of the Nativity of Mary, Máriaremete	1991	
Hungary	Eger	Metropolitan Cathedral Basilica of St John the Apostle and Evangelist, St Michael and the Immaculate Conception	1970	
Hungary	Gödöllő	Basilica of St Mary, Máriabesnyő	2008	
Hungary	Győr	Cathedral of the Assumption	1997	
Hungary	Keszthely	St Teresa's Basilica (Carmelite Church)	1989	
Hungary	Máriapócs	Shrine of the Weeping Mother of God	1948	
Hungary	Mátraverebély	Basilica of Our Lady of Assumption	1970	
Hungary	Pannonhalma	St Martin's Basilica, Pannonhalma Archabbey	1942	
Hungary	Pécs	Cathedral of St Peter and St Paul	1991	
Hungary	Sárospatak	St Elizabeth's Basilica	2007	
Hungary	Székesfehérvár	Cathedral Basilica of St Stephen the King	1938	
Hungary	Veszprém	St Michael's Cathedral	1981	
Hungary	Zirc	Basilica of the Assumption, Zirc Abbey	1982	
Iceland	Reykjavík	Cathedral of Our Lord Jesus Christ King of the Universe	1999	
Ireland	Knock	Basilica Shrine of Our Lady of Knock, Queen of Ireland	1979	
Ireland	Pettigo	Basilica of St Patrick, Lough Derg (St Patrick's Purgatory)	1931	
Italy	See List of basilicas in Italy			
Latvia	Aglona	Basilica of the Assumption	1980	
Lithuania	Kaunas	Archcathedral Basilica of SS Peter and Paul	1921	
Lithuania	Kaunas	Basilica of the Resurrection	2015	
Lithuania	Krekenava	Basilica of the Assumption	2011	
Lithuania	Marijampolė	Basilica of St Michael the Archangel	1992	
Lithuania	Šiluva	Basilica of the Nativity of the Blessed Virgin Mary	1974	
Lithuania	Trakai	Basilica of the Visitation of the Blessed Virgin Mary	2017	
Lithuania	Vilnius	Archcathedral Basilica of St Stanislaus and St Vladislav	1985	
Lithuania	Žemaičių Kalvarija	Basilica of Our Lady	1988	
Luxembourg	Echternach	Basilica of St Willbrord, Echternach Abbey	1939	
Malta	Birkirkara	St Helen's Basilica	1950	
Malta	Għarb	National Shrine of the Blessed Virgin of Ta' Pinu	1932	
Malta	Għarb	Basilica of the Visitation	1967	
Malta	Mosta	Basilica of the Assumption of Our Lady	2018	
Malta	Nadur	Basilica of SS Peter and Paul	1967	
Malta	Paola	Basilica of Christ the King	2020	
Malta	Rabat	Basilica of St Paul	2020	
Malta	Senglea	Basilica of the Nativity of the Virgin Mary	1920	
Malta	Valletta	Basilica of St Dominic	1816	
Malta	Valletta	Basilica Shrine of Our Lady of Carmel	1895	
Malta	Victoria	Basilica of St George Martyr	1958	
Malta	Xagħra	Basilica of the Nativity of the Virgin Mary	1967	
Montenegro	Kotor	Kotor Cathedral	2009	
Netherlands	Almelo	Basilica of St George	2009	
Netherlands	Amsterdam	Basilica of St Nicholas	2012	
Netherlands	Arnhem	Basilica of St Walburg	1964	
Netherlands	Bolsward	Basilica of St Francis	2016	
Netherlands	Boxmeer	Basilica of SS Peter and Paul	1999	
Netherlands	Boxtel	Basilica of the Chair of St Peter of Antioch	2009	
Netherlands	Groenlo	Basilica of St Callixtus	2014	
Netherlands	Haarlem	Cathedral Basilica of St Bavo	1948	
Netherlands	Halderberge	Basilica of SS Agatha and Barbara, Oudenbosch	1912	
Netherlands	Hengelo	Basilica of St Lambert	1997	
Netherlands	's-Hertogenbosch	Cathedral Basilica of St John the Evangelist	1929	
Netherlands	Hulst	Basilica of St Willibrord	1935	
Netherlands	IJsselstein	Basilica of St Nicholas	1972	
Netherlands	Laren	Basilica of St John the Baptist	1937	
Netherlands	Maastricht	Basilica of Our Lady of the Assumption	1932	
Netherlands	Maastricht	Basilica of St Servatius	1985	
Netherlands	Meerssen	Basilica of the Holy Sacrament	1938	
Netherlands	Oirschot	Basilica of St Peter	2013	
Netherlands	Oldenzaal	Basilica of St Plechelm	1950	
Netherlands	Oosterhout	Basilica of St John the Baptist	1977	
Netherlands	Raalte	Basilica of the Exaltation of the Holy Cross	1992	
Netherlands	Schiedam	Basilica of St Lidwina and Our Lady of the Rosary	1990	
Netherlands	Sint Odiliënberg	Basilica of SS Wiro, Plechelm and Otger	1957	
Netherlands	Sittard	Basilica of Our Lady of the Sacred Heart	1883	
Netherlands	Susteren	Basilica of St Amelberga	2007	
Netherlands	Tubbergen	Basilica of St Pancratius	2000	
Netherlands	Venlo	Basilica of St Martin	2018	
Netherlands	Zwolle	Basilica of Our Lady of the Assumption	1999	
Poland	Augustów	Basilica of the Sacred Heart of Jesus	2001	
Poland	Białystok	Archcathedral Basilica of the Assumption	1985	
Poland	Białystok	Basilica of St Roch	2018	
Poland	Bielsk Podlaski	Basilica of the Nativity and St Nicholas	1996	
Poland	Bielsko-Biała	Basilica of the Visitation (Hałcnów)	2015	
Poland	Bochnia	Basilica of St Nicholas	1997	
Poland	Braniewo	Basilica of St Catherine	2001	
Poland	Brzesko	Basilica of St Mary Magdalene and St Stanislaus, Szczepanów	2003	
Poland	Brzozów	Basilica of the Assumption, Stara Wieś (Jesuit Church)	1927	
Poland	Brzozów	Collegiate Basilica of the Transfiguration	2017	
Poland	Bydgoszcz	Basilica of St Vincent de Paul	1997	
Poland	Bydgoszcz	Basilica of Our Lady, Queen of Martyrs	2014	
Poland	Chełm	Basilica of the Nativity of the Virgin Mary	1988	
Poland	Chełmża	Co-Cathedral Basilica of the Holy Trinity	1982	
Poland	Chojnice	Basilica of the Beheading of St John the Baptist	1993	
Poland	Czerwińsk nad Wisłą	Basilica of the Annunciation	1967	
Poland	Częstochowa	Basilica of the Assumption, Jasna Góra	1906	
Poland	Częstochowa	Archcathedral Basilica of the Holy Family	1962	
Poland	Dąbrowa Białostocka	Basilica of the Presentation, Różanystok	1987	
Poland	Dąbrowa Górnicza	Basilica of Our Lady of the Angels	1901	
Poland	Dąbrowa Górnicza	Basilica of the Sacred Heart of Jesus	2008	
Poland	Dąbrowa Tarnowska	Basilica of Our Lady of the Scapular	2026	
Poland	Dobre Miasto	Basilica of the Holy Saviour and All Saints	1989	
Poland	Frombork	Archcathedral Basilica of the Assumption and St Andrew the Apostle	1965	
Poland	Gdańsk	Basilica of St Nicholas (Dominican Church)	1928	
Poland	Gdańsk	Co-Cathedral Basilica of the Assumption (St Mary's Church)	1965	
Poland	Gdańsk	Archcathedral Basilica of the Holy Trinity, Oliwa	1976	
Poland	Gdańsk	Basilica of St Brigid	1991	
Poland	Gdynia	Collegiate Basilica of the Blessed Virgin Mary, Queen of Poland	2018	
Poland	Gidle	Basilica of the Assumption (Dominican Church)	1998	
Poland	Gietrzwałd	Basilica of the Nativity of the Virgin Mary	1970	
Poland	Gniezno	Archcathedral Basilica of the Assumption and St Adalbert	1931	
Poland	Gostyń	Basilica of the Immaculate Conception, Święta Góra	1970	
Poland	Grybów	Basilica of St Catherine of Alexandria	2012	
Poland	Janów Podlaski	Basilica of the Holy Trinity	2017	
Poland	Jarosław	Basilica of Our Lady of Sorrows, Jarosław Dominican Monastery	1966	
Poland	Jędrzejów	Cistercian Archabbey and Basilica of the Assumption	2026	
Poland	Kalisz	Collegiate Basilica of the Assumption	1978	
Poland	Kalwaria Pacławska	Basilica of the Passion of Christ and the Mother of God	2020	
Poland	Kalwaria Zebrzydowska	Basilica of Our Lady of the Angels	1980	
Poland	Kamienna Góra	Basilica of the Assumption, Krzeszów	1998	
Poland	Katowice	Basilica of St. Louis the King and the Assumption of the Blessed Virgin Mary	1974	
Poland	Katowice	Basilica of St Stephen	2015	
Poland	Kętrzyn	Basilica of St George	1999	
Poland	Kielce	Cathedral Basilica of the Assumption	1970	
Poland	Kiwity	Basilica Shrine of the Mother of Peace, Stoczek Monastery	1987	
Poland	Kodeń	Basilica of St Ann	1973	
Poland	Kołobrzeg	Co-Cathedral Basilica of the Assumption	1986	
Poland	Kraków	Archcathedral Basilica of St Stanislaus Bishop and Martyr and St Wenceslas (Wawel Cathedral)	Immemorial	
Poland	Kraków	Basilica of St Francis of Assisi (Franciscan Church)	1919	
Poland	Kraków	Basilica of the Holy Trinity (Dominican Church)	1957	
Poland	Kraków	Basilica of St Peter and St Paul	1960	
Poland	Kraków	Basilica of the Sacred Heart of Jesus (Jesuit Church)	1960	
Poland	Kraków	Basilica of the Assumption of the Blessed Virgin Mary Queen of Poland (St Mary's Basilica)	1963	
Poland	Kraków	Basilica of the Exaltation of the Holy Cross, Mogiła Abbey	1970	
Poland	Kraków	Basilica of the Visitation (Carmelite Church)	1996	
Poland	Kraków	Basilica of St Florian	1999	
Poland	Kraków	Basilica of St Michael the Archangel and St Stanislaus (Skałką Church)	2003	
Poland	Kraków	Divine Mercy Sanctuary, Kraków	2003	
Poland	Kraków	Corpus Christi Basilica	2005	
Poland	Krosno	Basilica of the Holy Trinity	1998	
Poland	Krotoszyn	Basilica of St John the Baptist	2019	
Poland	Kruszwica	Basilica of St Peter and St Paul	1970	
Poland	Lądek	Basilica of the Blessed Virgin Mary and St. Nicholas, Ląd nad Wartą	2026	
Poland	Legnickie Pole	Basilica of the Exaltation of the Holy Cross and St. Jadwiga	2014	
Poland	Leśna Podlaska	Basilica of St Peter and St Paul	1984	
Poland	Leśnica	Basilica of St Ann, Góra Świętej Anny	1980	
Poland	Leżajsk	Basilica of the Annunciation of the Blessed Virgin Mary, Leżajsk Monastery	1928	
Poland	Limanowa	Basilica of Our Lady of Sorrows	1991	
Poland	Łódź	Archcathedral Basilica of St Stanislaus Kostka	1989	
Poland	Łowicz	Cathedral Basilica of the Assumption and St Nicholas	1999	
Poland	Lublin	Basilica of St Stanislaus (Dominican Church)	1967	
Poland	Miechów	Basilica of the Holy Sepulchre	1996	
Poland	Mielec	Basilica of St Matthew the Apostle and Evangelist	2006	
Poland	Myszyniec	Collegiate Basilica of the Holy Trinity and St. Martin	2013	
Poland	Nowe Miasto Lubawskie	Basilica of St Thomas the Apostle	1971	
Poland	Nowy Sącz	Collegiate Basilica of St Margaret	1992	
Poland	Nowy Targ	Basilica of Our Lady, Ludźmierz	2001	
Poland	Oleśnica	Basilica of St John the Evangelist	1998	
Poland	Olkusz	Basilica of St Andrew the Apostle	2001	
Poland	Olsztyn	Co-Cathedral Basilica of St James the Apostle	2004	
Poland	Opole	Cathedral Basilica of the Holy Cross	1934	
Poland	Parczew	Basilica of St John the Baptist	1989	
Poland	Pelplin	Cathedral Basilica of the Assumption	1965	
Poland	Piekary Śląskie	Basilica of the Blessed Virgin Mary and St Bartholomew the Apostle	1962	
Poland	Piotrków Trybunalski	Basilica of St James the Apostle	2019	
Poland	Płock	Cathedral Basilica of St Sigismund	1910	
Poland	Poświętne	Basilica of St Philip Neri and St John the Baptist, Studzianna	1973	
Poland	Poznań	Archcathedral Basilica of St Peter and St Paul	1962	
Poland	Poznań	Basilica of St Joseph	2016	
Poland	Przemyśl	Archcathedral Basilica of the Assumption and St John the Baptist	1960	
Poland	Przeworsk	Basilica of the Holy Spirit	1982	
Poland	Przytoczna	Basilica of Our Lady of Rokitno	2001	
Poland	Pszów	Basilica of the Nativity of the Virgin Mary	1997	
Poland	Pułtusk	Basilica of the Annunciation	1974	
Poland	Łobżenica	Basilica of the Immaculate Conception, Rataje (Pila County)	2014	
Poland	Radecznica	Monastery of St Anthony of Padua Basilica	2015	
Poland	Radków	Basilica of the Visitation, Wambierzyce	1935	
Poland	Radom	Basilica of St Casimir	2003	
Poland	Reszel	Basilica of the visitation, Święta Lipka	1983	
Poland	Rybnik	Basilica of St Anthony of Padua	1993	
Poland	Rychwałd	Basilica of St Nicholas	2017	
Poland	Sandomierz	Cathedral Basilica of the Nativity of the Virgin Mary	1960	
Poland	Sejny	Basilica of the Visitation	1973	
Poland	Sieradz	Collegiate Basilica of All Saints	2018	
Poland	Skarżysko-Kamienna	Basilica of Mother of Mercy of the Gate of Dawn	2013	
Poland	Skrzatusz	Basilica of the Assumption	2018	
Poland	Ślesin	Basilica of Our Lady Queen of Poland, Licheń (Sanctuary of Our Lady of Licheń)	2005	
Poland	Sosnowiec	Cathedral Basilica of the Assumption	1999	
Poland	Środa Wielkopolska	Collegiate Basilica of the Assumption	2021	
Poland	Stalowa Wola	Co-Cathedral Basilica of Mary Queen of Poland	1998	
Poland	Strzegom	Basilica of St Peter and St Paul	2002	
Poland	Szamotuły	Basilica of Our Lady of Consolation and St. Stanislaus	2014	
Poland	Szczecin	Archcathedral Basilica of St James the Apostle	1983	
Poland	Tarnów	Cathedral Basilica of the Nativity of the Virgin Mary	1972	
Poland	Teresin	Basilica of St Mary Immaculate (Shrine of St Maximilian Kolbe), Niepokalanów Monastery	1980	
Poland	Toruń	Cathedral Basilica of St John the Baptist	1935	
Poland	Trzebinia	Basilica of the Most Sacred Heart of Jesus	2013	
Poland	Trzebnica	Basilica of St Jadwiga (Church of St Bartholomew), St Jadwiga's Convent	1943	
Poland	Trzemeszno	Basilica of the Assumption	1969	
Poland	Twardogóra	Basilica of Our Lady Help of Christians	2003	
Poland	Tychy	Basilica of St Mary Magdalene	2025	
Poland	Uniejów	Collegiate Basilica of the Assumption	2025	
Poland	Wadowice	Basilica of the Presentation	1993	
Poland	Warsaw	Basilica of the Sacred Heart of Jesus	1923	
Poland	Warsaw	Archcathedral Basilica of St John the Baptist	1961	
Poland	Warsaw	Cathedral Basilica of St Michael the Archangel and St Florian	1997	
Poland	Warsaw	Basilica of the Holy Cross	2002	
Poland	Wąwolnica	Basilica of St Adalbert	2001	
Poland	Węgrów	Basilica of the Assumption	1997	
Poland	Wiślica	Basilica of the Nativity of the Virgin Mary	2004	
Poland	Wrocław	Archcathedral Basilica of St John the Baptist	1907	
Poland	Wrocław	Basilica of St Elisabeth	2003	
Poland	Zawiercie	Basilica of St Peter and St Paul	2009	
Portugal	Braga	Cathedral of St Mary	1905	
Portugal	Braga	Basilica of Our Lady of Sameiro, Espinho	1964	
Portugal	Braga	Congregados Basilica	1975	
Portugal	Braga	Sanctuary of Bom Jesus do Monte	2015	
Portugal	Évora	Cathedral of St Mary of the Assumption	1929	
Portugal	Fátima	Basilica of Our Lady of the Rosary	1954	
Portugal	Fátima	Basilica of the Most Holy Trinity	2012	
Portugal	Guimarães	Basilica of St Peter	1751	
Portugal	Guimarães	Basilica of St Torcato	2020	
Portugal	Lisbon	Basilica of the Sacred Heart of Jesus of Estrela	1789	
Portugal	Lisbon	Basilica of Our Lady of the Martyrs	1784	
Portugal	Mafra	Basilica of the Sacred Heart of Jesus, Mafra National Palace	1730	
Portugal	Outeiro	Basilica of the Holy Christ, Outeiro	2014	
Portugal	Terras de Bouro	Basilica of St Benedict, Rio Caldo	2015	
Portugal	Torre de Moncorvo	Basilica of Our Lady of the Assumption	2022	
Portugal	Viana do Castelo	Basilica Shrine of the Most Sacred Heart of Jesus	2025	
Romania	Cacica	Shrine Basilica of Cacica	2000	
Romania	Lipova	Maria Radna Basilica	1992	
Romania	Miercurea-Ciuc	Basilica of Our Lady, Şumuleu Ciuc	1948	
Romania	Oradea	Cathedral of the Assumption	1991	
Russian Federation	Saint Petersburg	Church of St Catherine	2013	
San Marino	San Marino	Co-Cathedral Basilica of St Marinus	1926	
Serbia	Sremska Mitrovica	Cathedral Basilica of St Demetrius	1991	
Serbia	Subotica	Cathedral Basilica of St Teresa of Avila	1974	
Slovakia	Bardejov	Basilica of St Giles	2000	
Slovakia	Hronský Beňadik	Abbey Basilica of St Benedict	2019	
Slovakia	Kežmarok	Basilica of the Exaltation of the Holy Cross	1998	
Slovakia	Komárno	Basilica of St Andrew	2017	
Slovakia	Levoča	Basilica of St James	2015	
Slovakia	Levoča	Basilica of the Visitation, Mariánska hora	1988	
Slovakia	Ľutina	Basilica of the Assumption	1988	
Slovakia	Marianka	Basilica of the Nativity of the Virgin Mary	2011	
Slovakia	Michalovce	Basilica of the Descent of the Holy Spirit	2012	
Slovakia	Nitra	St Emmeram's Cathedral	1998	
Slovakia	Rajecká Lesná	Basilica of the Nativity of the Blessed Virgin Mary	2002	
Slovakia	Šaštín-Stráže	Basilica of the Seven Sorrows of the Blessed Virgin Mary	1964	
Slovakia	Staré Hory	Basilica of the Visitation	1990	
Slovakia	Trnava	Basilica of St Nicholas	2008	
Slovakia	Vranov nad Topľou	Basilica of the Birth of the Virgin Mary	2008	
Slovenia	Brestanica	Basilica of St Mary of Lourdes	1928	
Slovenia	Ivančna Gorica	Basilica of Our Lady, Stična Abbey	1936	
Slovenia	Majšperk	Basilica of the Virgin Mary with a Coat, Ptujska Gora	2009	
Slovenia	Maribor	Basilica of Mary, Mother of Mercy	1906	
Slovenia	Nova Gorica	Basilica of Our Lady of Grace, Sveta Gora	1906	
Slovenia	Radovljica	Basilica of Mary Help of Christians, Brezje	1988	
Slovenia	Žalec	Basilica of the Visitation, Petrovče pri Celju	1984	
Spain	Ágreda	Basilica of Our Lady of the Miagros	Immemorial	
Spain	Alba de Tormes	Basilica of St Teresa	1870	
Spain	Algemesí	Basilica of St James the Apostle	1986	
Spain	Alicante	Basilica of Santa Maria, Alicante	2007	
Spain	Andújar	Basilica and Royal Shrine of Our Lady of Cabeza	2010	
Spain	Arcos de la Frontera	Basilica of St Mary of the Assumption	1993	
Spain	Aspe	Basilica of Our Lady of Succour	2006	
Spain	Ávila	Basilica of Saint Teresa of Jesus	2022	
Spain	Azpeitia	Basilica of St Ignatius of Loyola	1921	
Spain	Balaguer	Basilica of the Holy Christ of Balaguer	2016	
Spain	Barbastro	Basilica of Our Lady of Badaín	Immemorial	
Spain	Barcelona	Cathedral Basilica of the Holy Cross and St Eulalia	1867	
Spain	Barcelona	Basilica of the Mother of God of Mercy	1918	
Spain	Barcelona	Basilica of St Mary of the Sea	1923	
Spain	Barcelona	Basilica of St Mary of the Pine	1925	
Spain	Barcelona	Basilica of St Joseph Oriol	1936	
Spain	Barcelona	Basilica of SS Just and Pastor	1946	
Spain	Barcelona	National Expiatory Church of the Sacred Heart of Jesus of Tibidado	1961	
Spain	Barcelona	Basilica of the Purest Conception	2009	
Spain	Barcelona	Basilica and Expiatory Church of the Holy Family	2010	
Spain	Benissa	Basílica de la Puríssima Xiqueta	2022	
Spain	Bilbao	Cathedral of St James the Apostlel (Santiago Cathedral)	1819	
Spain	Bilbao	Basilica of Our Lady of Begoña	1908	
Spain	Burriana	Basilica of the Saviour	2013	
Spain	Calatayud	Collegiate Basilica of the Holy Sepulchre	2020	
Spain	Candelaria, Tenerife	Basilica of Our Lady of Candelaria	2011	
Spain	Cangas del Narcea	Basilica of St Mary Magdalene	1992	
Spain	Caravaca de la Cruz	Basilica of the Most Holy and True Cross	2007	
Spain	Cartagena	Basilica of Our Lady of Charity	2012	
Spain	Castelló d'Empúries	Basilica of St Mary	2006	
Spain	Castellón de la Plana	Basilica of St Mary of the Hackberry	1983	
Spain	Ciudad Real	Cathedral Basilica of St Mary of the Meadow	1967	
Spain	Ciutadella	Cathedral Basilica of St Mary	1953	
Spain	Colmenar Viejo	Basilica of the Assumption	2002	
Spain	Córdoba	Basilica of St Peter the Apostle	2005	
Spain	Covadonga	Basilica of St Mary the Royal	1901	
Spain	Durango	Basilica of St Mary of Uribarri	2001	
Spain	El Puerto de Santa María	Basilica of Our Lady of Miracles	2014	
Spain	Elche	Basilica of St Mary of Elche	1951	
Spain	Elorrio	Basilica of the Pure Conception	1966	
Spain	Escorca	Basilica of the Mother of God, Monastery of Our Lady of Lluc	1962	
Spain	Foz	Basilica of St Martin of Mondoñedo	2007	
Spain	Getafe	Basilica of the Sacred Heart of Jesus, Cerro de los Ángeles	2019	
Spain	Gijón	Shrine Basilica of the Sacred Heart	2003	
Spain	Girona	Basilica of St Felix	2011	
Spain	Granada	Basilica of St John of God	1916	
Spain	Granada	Basilica of Our Lady of Anguish	1922	
Spain	Graus	Basilica of St Mary of the Rock	1810	
Spain	Guadalupe	Basilica of St Mary of Guadalupe, Royal Monastery of St Mary of Guadalupe	1955	
Spain	Huesca	Basilica of St Lawrence	1884	
Spain	Igualada	Basilica of St Mary	1948	
Spain	Jaén	Basilica of St Ildephonsus	2010	
Spain	Jerez de la Frontera	Basilica of Our Lady of Mercy	1949	
Spain	Jerez de la Frontera	Basilica of Our Lady of Carmel	1967	
Spain	La Seu d'Urgell	Cathedral Basilica of St Mary of La Seu d'Urgell	1905	
Spain	Las Palmas de Gran Canaria	Cathedral Basilica of St Ann	1894	
Spain	Lekeitio	Basilica of the Assumption	1884	
Spain	León	Basilica of St Isidore of León	1942	
Spain	León	Shrine Basilica of Our Lady The Virgin of the Way	2009	
Spain	Linares	Basilica of St Mary Major	2016	
Spain	Llanes	Cathedral Basilica of St Mary of the Assumption of Llanes	1973	
Spain	Llíria	Basilica of Our Lady of the Assumption	2024	
Spain	Lugo	Cathedral Basilica of Our Lady of Carmel	1896	
Spain	Madrid	Ex-Cathedral Basilica of St Isidore	Immemorial	
Spain	Madrid	Royal Basilica of Our Lady of Atocha	1863	
Spain	Madrid	Basilica of St Vincent de Paul	1923	
Spain	Madrid	Pontifical Basilica of St Michael	1930	
Spain	Madrid	Royal Basilica of St Francis the Great	1962	
Spain	Madrid	Basilica of Our Father Jesus of Mendinaceli	1973	
Spain	Madrid	Basilica of the Immaculate Conception	2014	
Spain	Madrid	Basilica of Mary Help of Christians	2025	
Spain	Málaga	Cathedral Basilica of the Virgin of the Incarnation	1855	
Spain	Málaga	Basilica of the Sweet Name of Jesus of Nazareth of Peace and Holy Mary of Hope	1998	
Spain	Málaga	Basilica of Our Lady of Victory and Mercies	2007	
Spain	Manresa	Collegiate Basilica of St Mary of the Seat	1886	
Spain	Mataró	Basilica of St Mary	1928	
Spain	Mérida	Basilica of St Eulalia	2014	
Spain	Mondoñedo	Cathedral Basilica of the Virgin of the Assumption	1962	
Spain	Monistrol de Montserrat	Basilica of the Mother of God of Montserrat	1881	
Spain	Montilla	Basilica of St John of Avila	2013	
Spain	Morella	Basilica of St Mary Major	1958	
Spain	Olot	Basilica of St Stephen	2024	
Spain	Oñati	Basilica of Our Lady of Arantzazu	1921	
Spain	Oria	Basilica of Our Lady of Mercies	1890	
Spain	Oviedo	Metropolitan Cathedral Basilica of the Holy Saviour	1872	
Spain	Oviedo	Basilica of St John the Baptist	2014	
Spain	Palma de Mallorca	Cathedral of St Mary of Palma (La Seu)	1905	
Spain	Palma de Mallorca	Basilica of St Francis	1943	
Spain	Palma de Mallorca	Basilica of St Michael	2018	
Spain	Ponferrada	Basilica of Our Lady of the Holm Oak	1958	
Spain	Pontevedra	Basilica of St Mary Major	1962	
Spain	Portugalete	Basilica of St Mary of Portugalete	1951	
Spain	Queralbs	Basilica of the Mother of God of Núria	2014	
Spain	Salamanca	Old Cathedral of St Mary of the Siege	1854	
Spain	San Lorenzo de El Escorial	Basilica of St Lawrence, El Escorial	Immemorial	
Spain	San Lorenzo de El Escorial	Basilica of the Holy Cross, Valle de los Caídos	1960	
Spain	Sanlúcar de Barrameda	Basilica of Our Lady of Charity	1997	
Spain	San Sebastián	Basilica of St Mary of the Chorus	1973	
Spain	Santander	Cathedral Basilica of St Mary and the Holy Martyrs Emeterius and Celedonius	Immemorial	
Spain	Santiago de Compostela	Metropolitan Cathedral Basilica of St James of Compostela	Immemorial	
Spain	Santo Domingo de Silos	Basilica of Santo Domingo de Silos	2000	
Spain	Segorbe	Cathedral Basilica of the Assumption	1985	
Spain	Seville	Basilica of Our Lady of Hope "Macarena"	1966	
Spain	Seville	Basilica of Jesus of the Great Power	1992	
Spain	Seville	Shrine Basilica of Mary Help of Christians	2008	
Spain	Seville	Basilica of the Christ of the Expiation	2012	
Spain	Sigüenza	Cathedral Basilica of the Assumption	1948	
Spain	Solsona	Cathedral Basilica of St Mary	1953	
Spain	Talavera de la Reina	Basilica of Our Lady of the Meadow	1989	
Spain	Tarragona	Metropolitan and Primatial Cathedral Basilica of St Tecla	1894	
Spain	Telde	Basilica of St John the Baptist	1973	
Spain	Teror	Basilica of Our Lady of the Pine	1915	
Spain	Terrassa	Cathedral Basilica of the Holy Spirit of Terrassa	1951	
Spain	Tortosa	Cathedral Basilica of the Virgin of the Sorrows	1919	
Spain	Tremp	Basilica of the Mother of God of Valldeflors	1923	
Spain	Úbeda	Basilica of Our Lady of the Alcazar	2014	
Spain	Urda	Basilica of the Christ of the Vera Cruz	2021	
Spain	Valencia	Metropolitan Cathedral Basilica of St Mary	1886	
Spain	Valencia	Royal Basilica of Our Lady of the Forlorn	1948	
Spain	Valencia	Basilica of St Vincent Ferrer	1951	
Spain	Valencia	Basilica of the Sacred Heart of Jesus	2019	
Spain	Valladolid	National Shrine of the Great Promise	1964	
Spain	Vic	Cathedral Basilica of St Peter of Vic	1893	
Spain	Vigo	Basilica Co-cathedral of St. Mary	2020	
Spain	Vilafranca del Penedès	Basilica of St Mary	1919	
Spain	Villarreal	Basilica of St Paschal Baylon	1996	
Spain	Vimbodí i Poblet	Basilica of St Mary of Poblet, Royal Monastery of Poblet	1963	
Spain	Vitoria	Old Cathedral of St Mary	1844	
Spain	Xàtiva	Collegiate Basilica of St Mary	1973	
Spain	Yecla	Basilica of the Pure Conception	1868	
Spain	Zaragoza	Cathedral Basilica of Our Lady of the Pillar	1948	
Spain	Zaragoza	Basilica of St Encratius	1991	
Switzerland	Bern	Basilica of the Holy Trinity	1956	
Switzerland	Fribourg	Basilica of Our Lady	1932	
Switzerland	Geneva	Basilica of Our Lady	1954	
Switzerland	Kreuzlingen	Basilica of St Ulrich and St Afra	1967	
Switzerland	Lausanne	Basilica of Our Lady	1992	
Switzerland	Lugano	Basilica of the Heart of Jesus	1952	
Switzerland	Metzerlen-Mariastein	Basilica of St Mary, Mariastein Abbey	1926	
Switzerland	Morbio Inferiore	Shrine Basilica of St Mary of the Miracles	1990	
Switzerland	Neuchâtel	Basilica of Our Lady of the Assumption	2007	
Switzerland	Orselina	Shrine Basilica of Madonna del Sasso	1918	
Switzerland	Saint-Maurice	Abbatial Cathedral of St Maurice, Abbey of St Maurice	1948	
Switzerland	Sion	Basilica of Our Lady of Valère	1984	
Turkey	Istanbul	Cathedral Basilica of the Holy Spirit	1909	
Turkey	Istanbul	Basilica of St Anthony of Padua	1932	
Ukraine	Berdychiv	Basilica of the Immaculate Conception	2024	
Ukraine	Chernivtsi	Basilica of the Exaltation of the Holy Cross, Chernivtsi	2014	
Ukraine	Lviv	Metropolitan Cathedral Basilica of the Assumption (Latin Cathedral)	1910	
Ukraine	Odesa	Basilica of St Peter the Apostle	2019	
Ukraine	Zarvanytsia	Basilica of the Mother of God	2019	
United Kingdom	Barsham	Minor Basilica of Our Lady of Walsingham	2015	
United Kingdom	Birmingham	Metropolitan Cathedral of St Chad (St Chad's Cathedral)	1941	
United Kingdom	Manchester	Corpus Christi Basilica, Miles Platting	1907 (closed in 2007)	
United Kingdom	Stratton-on-the-Fosse	Basilica of St Gregory the Great, Downside Abbey	1935	

== Statistics ==
As of November 2019, there were 1,690 basilicas (four of them major; the rest minor) in the world.

=== Countries with more than 100 basilicas ===
- Italy (573) (includes 4 major basilicas, 1 in the Vatican)
- France (172)
- Spain (130)
- Poland (127)

=== Countries with between 10 and 100 basilicas ===
- United States (93)
- Brazil (79)
- Germany (77)
- Argentina (48)
- Colombia (42)
- India (37)
- Austria (35)
- Belgium (28)
- Netherlands (28)
- Mexico (27)
- Canada (27)
- Philippines (27)
- Venezuela (17)
- Hungary (16)
- Portugal (16)
- Czech Republic (15)
- Ecuador (12)
- Malta (12)
- Peru (12)
- Slovakia (12)
- Switzerland (12)
- Croatia (11)

=== Cities and municipalities with more than 10 basilicas ===
- Rome (66) (includes 4 major basilicas, 1 in the Vatican)
- Buenos Aires (15)
- Kraków (13)
- Bologna (11)
- Florence (11)

=== Cities and municipalities with between six and 10 basilicas ===
- Naples (9)
- Barcelona (9)
- Milan (9)
- Madrid (8)
- Rio de Janeiro (8)
- Venice (8)
- Cologne (6)
- Lima (6)
- Manila (6)
- Santiago (6)

=== Cities and municipalities with five basilicas ===
- Bogotá
- Genoa
- Jerusalem
- Paris
- Piacenza
- Prague
- Turin

=== Cities and municipalities with four basilicas ===
- Braga
- Gdańsk
- Kochi (6 total, extended metropolitan region)
- Marseille
- Montreal
- New York City
- Padua
- Ravenna
- Salvador
- São Paulo
- Seville
- Trapani
- Warsaw

=== Cities and municipalities with three basilicas ===
- Acireale
- Assisi
- Bari
- Berlin
- Bruges
- Cagliari
- Caltagirone
- Caracas
- Catania
- Chicago
- Chennai
- Düsseldorf
- Kochi
- La Paz
- Lecce
- Lourdes
- Málaga
- Mantua
- Monterrey
- Nancy
- Prato
- Quito
- Siena
- Trier
- Valencia
- Vercelli
- Verona
- Vienna

=== Cities and municipalities with two basilicas ===
- Agrigento
- Aparecida
- Annecy
- Arezzo
- Barletta
- Belo Horizonte
- Bilbao
- Bordeaux
- Brescia
- Budapest
- Caeté
- Cairo
- Camerino
- Capua
- Cesena
- Comiso
- Como
- Córdoba
- Cusco
- Częstochowa
- Fano
- Ferrara
- Finale Ligure
- Foggia
- Forio
- Forlì
- Granada
- Grenoble
- Istanbul
- Jerez de la Frontera
- Kaunas
- La Plata
- León
- Levoča
- Lisbon
- Lucca
- Lyon
- Maastricht
- Manizales
- Medellín
- Mendoza
- Mexico City
- Modena
- Montefiascone
- Montpellier
- Nantes
- Narbonne
- New Orleans
- Nice
- Nicosia
- Ottawa
- Palermo
- Palma de Mallorca
- Pesaro
- Philadelphia
- Pistoia
- Quezon City
- Rapallo
- Regensburg
- Reggio Emilia
- Reims
- Rennes
- Rosario
- Saint-Brieuc
- Saintes
- St. Louis
- Salta
- San Lorenzo de El Escorial
- San Salvador
- Santa Fe, Argentina
- Sées
- Savona
- Sucre
- Tolentino
- Toronto
- Toulouse
- Trento
- Valletta
- Viareggio
- Viterbo
- Wrocław
- Zaragoza

== Other basilicas ==
The following churches are often referred to as basilicas, but there does not appear to be evidence of their officially holding that status:

Country	Municipality	Church	Image
Cuba	Havana	Basilica of St Francis of Assisi	
Czech Republic	Prague	St George's Basilica	
France	Saint-Denis	Basilica of St Denis	
Hungary	Esztergom	Primatial Cathedral Basilica of the Blessed Virgin Mary taken into Heaven and St Adalbert	
New Zealand	Invercargill	St Mary's Basilica	
Nicaragua	León	Cathedral Basilica of the Assumption	
Portugal	Póvoa de Varzim	Basilica of the Sacred Heart of Jesus	

== See also ==
- List of basilicas in India
- List of basilicas in Italy
- List of basilicas in New Zealand
