= Basilica of Saint Sebastian =

Basilica of Saint Sebastian or St. Sebastian may refer to:

- Basilica of St. Sebastian, Salvador, in Salvador, Brazil
- Basilica of St. Sebastian, Barcellona Pozzo di Gotto, in Barcellona Pozzo di Gotto, Sicily
- Basilica of St. Sebastian Outside the Walls, otherwise the Basilica di San Sebastiano fuori le mura or San Sebastiano ad Catacumbas, Rome
- Basilica of St. Sebastian, Manila, otherwise San Sebastian Church (Manila), Philippines
- Basilica of St. Sebastian, Diriamba, Nicaragua
