= Basilica of the Holy Christ, Outeiro =

Church in Bragança, Portugal

Coordinates: 41.68375°N 6.60045°W

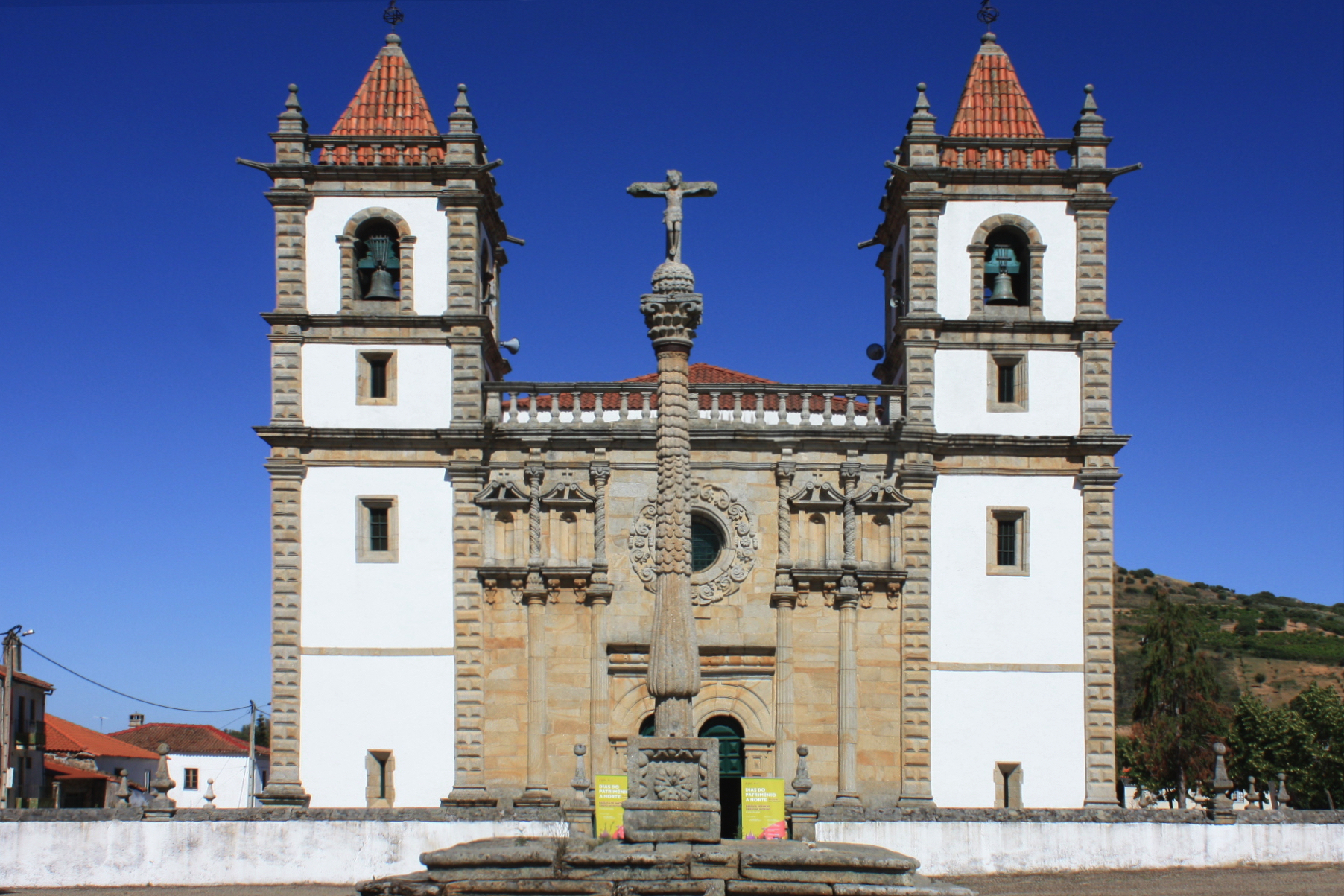

The Igreja do Santo Cristo do Outeiro is a National monument of Portugal. It is located in Bragança, in the parish of Outeiro.
