= St. Joseph's Minor Basilica Church =

Church building in Elmina, Ghana

Coordinates: 5.0871°N 1.3536°W

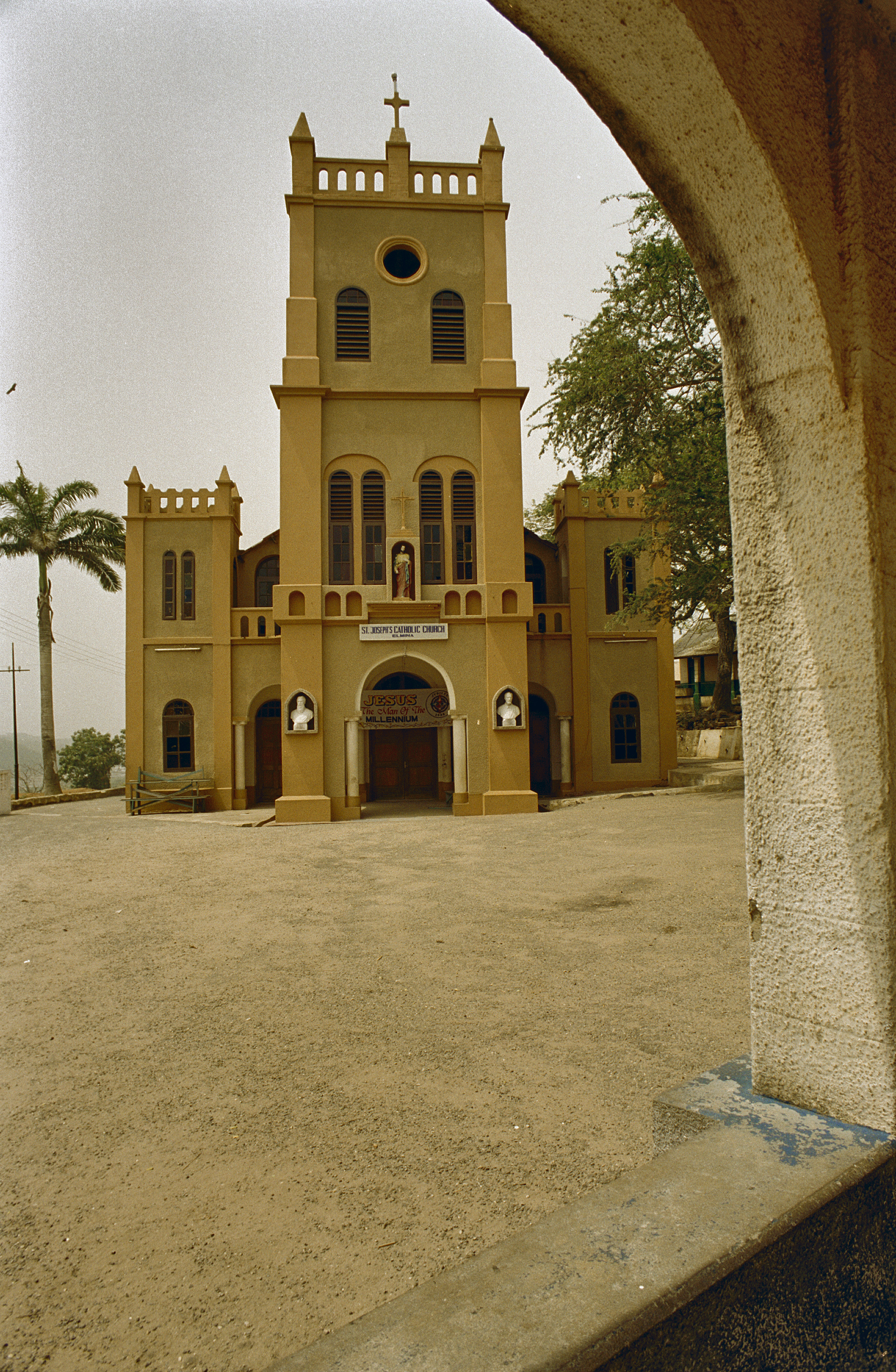

Religion
- Affiliation: Roman Catholic Church
- Ecclesiastical or organisational status: Minor basilica

Location
- Location: Elmina, Central Region, Ghana
- Interactive map of St. Joseph's Minor Basilica Church
- Territory: Metropolitan Archdiocese of Cape Coast (Cape Coast)

Architecture
- Completed: 1880 (146 years ago)

Specifications
- Dome: 1
- Spire: 1

St. Joseph's Minor Basilica Church is a Roman Catholic Church building in Elmina, in the Central Region of Ghana. Established in 1880, it was the first Roman Catholic church to have been established in Ghana. It was founded by [Fathers Maru] and [Marat], the first Dutch Catholic priests to minister to the Ghanaians. Their busts are fixed on either side of the front door.

== See also ==
- Architecture of Africa
- Roman Catholicism in Ghana
- List of Roman Catholic basilicas
