= Basilica of Our Lady of the Assumption, Neuchâtel =

Church in Geneva and Freiburg, Switzerland

Coordinates: 46°59′41″N 6°56′29″E

Basilica of Our Lady of the Assumption
- Basilique Notre-Dame de l’Assomption; Basilika Mariä Himmelfahrt
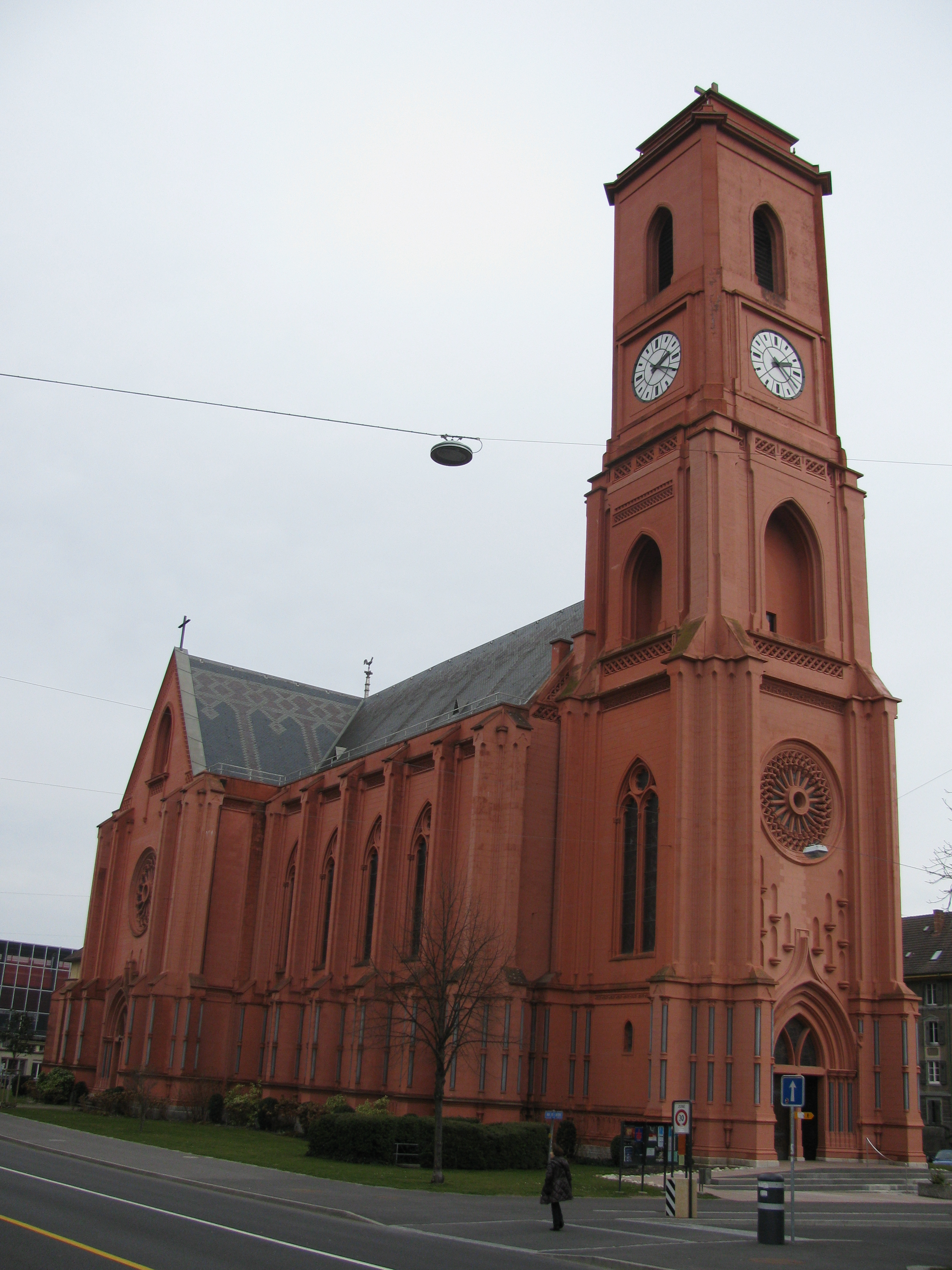
- Basilica of Our Lady of the Assumption

- Location of Our Lady of the Assumption in Switzerland
- Country: Switzerland
- Denomination: Roman Catholic

History
- Status: Minor Basilica
- Founded: March 25, 1906

Architecture
- Functional status: Active
- Heritage designation: Bien culturel d'importance nationale
- Architect: Guillaume Ritter
- Architectural type: Neo-gothic

Administration
- Province: Canton of Neuchâtel
- Diocese: Roman Catholic Diocese of Lausanne, Geneva and Fribourg

The Roman Catholic Our Lady of Assumption Church, also known as the Red Church, stands in the Swiss city of Neuchâtel in the diocese of Lausanne, Geneva and Freiburg. The Neo-Gothic church was planned by Guillaume Ritter and consecrated on March 25, 1906. After a major renovation between 1984 and 2000, it was recognized in 1986 as a national monument. In 2007 Pope Benedict XVI raised the church's status to that of basilica minor.

The building is constructed of artificial stone, made on site and tinted to obtain the reddish appearance of Alsace sandstone. The interior has three aisles and a transept. In addition to 14 large paintings representing the Stations of the Cross, five choir windows and a large rosette, the vaulted roof is designed to represent the night sky with almost 10,000 stars. In 1937 a new high altar by the architect Fernand Dumas de Romont was created, whose centrepiece is a calvary by Marcel Feuillat. In 1933, three large bells, named Maria-Josepha, Faith and Charity, replaced the three smaller ones dating from 1912.

Apart from serving the spiritual needs of 62,000 Neuchâtel Catholics, the basilica is also the most important pilgrimage church in the canton.

The Swiss theologian and mystic Maurice Zundel is buried in the church.

== See also ==
- List of Roman Catholic basilicas
