= Church of the Virgin Mary, Braslaw =

Church in Vitebsk Region, Belarus

Basilica of the Nativity of the Blessed Virgin Mary
- Church of Virgin Mary
- Касцёл Нараджэння Найсвяцейшай Дзевы Марыі
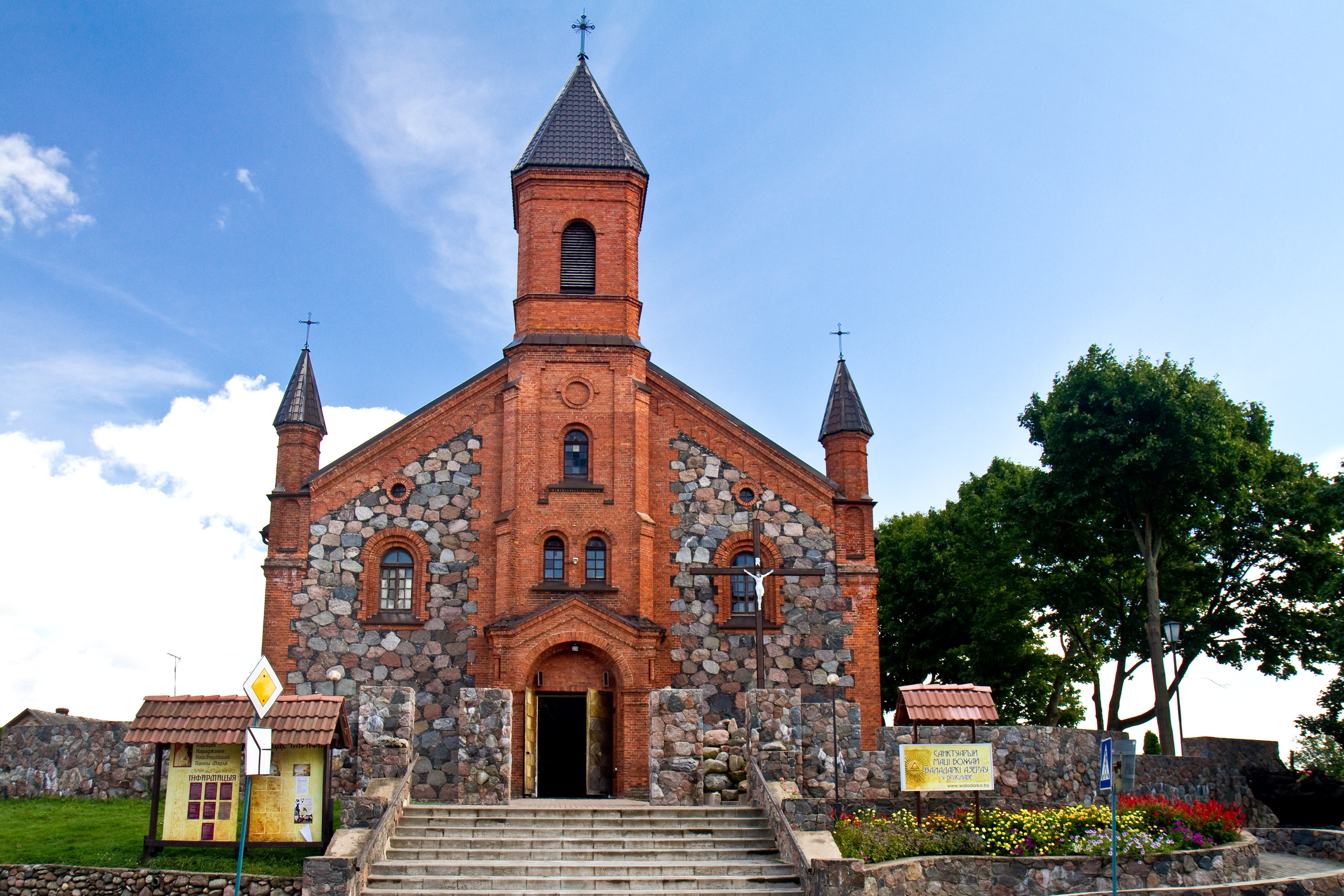
- Church in 2010
- Basilica of the Nativity of the Blessed Virgin Mary
- Location: Braslaw, Sovetskaya str., 1
- Country: Belarus
- Denomination: Catholic

History
- Status: Minor basilica
- Dedication: Nativity of Mary
- Consecrated: 1897

Architecture
- Functional status: Active
- Architectural type: Romanesque Revival
- Completed: 1824, 1897

Administration
- Diocese: Roman Catholic Diocese of Vitebsk

The Church of the Virgin Mary is a Roman Catholic minor basilica of the Roman Catholic Diocese of Vitebsk. The church was constructed in 1824 and rebuilt in 1897. It is an object of Belarusian architectural heritage.

== History ==
The first mentions of a Catholic church on Zamkovaya Mountain in Braslaw date back to the early 15th century. The church then was made of wood, during wars and military conflicts it was many times destroyed by fire, but always rebuilt. In 1794 during the Kościuszko Uprising the church was burned down by the Russian army. By 1824 it was rebuilt in stone.

By the end of the century the church was no longer sufficient for the growing diocese, which had over 16,000 Catholics. The church was rebuilt in Romanesque Revival style and consecrated in 1897.

During the Nazi occupation, the church's pastor, Mechislav Akreitz, was executed for helping Jews.

In 1950 the church was closed and for two years its building was used as a grain storage. In 1952 the local Christian community managed to take it back and restore the original function.

In 2017 a new organ was installed in the church. On May 23, 2024, Pope Francis, through the Dicastery for Divine Worship and the Discipline of the Sacraments, decreed that the church will be elevated to the status of minor basilica. This was announced on the closing of festivities of the Virgin Mary in Braslaw in August 2024.
