= Basilica of St. Anthony, Santos =

Basilica of St. Anthony
- Basílica de Santo Antônio
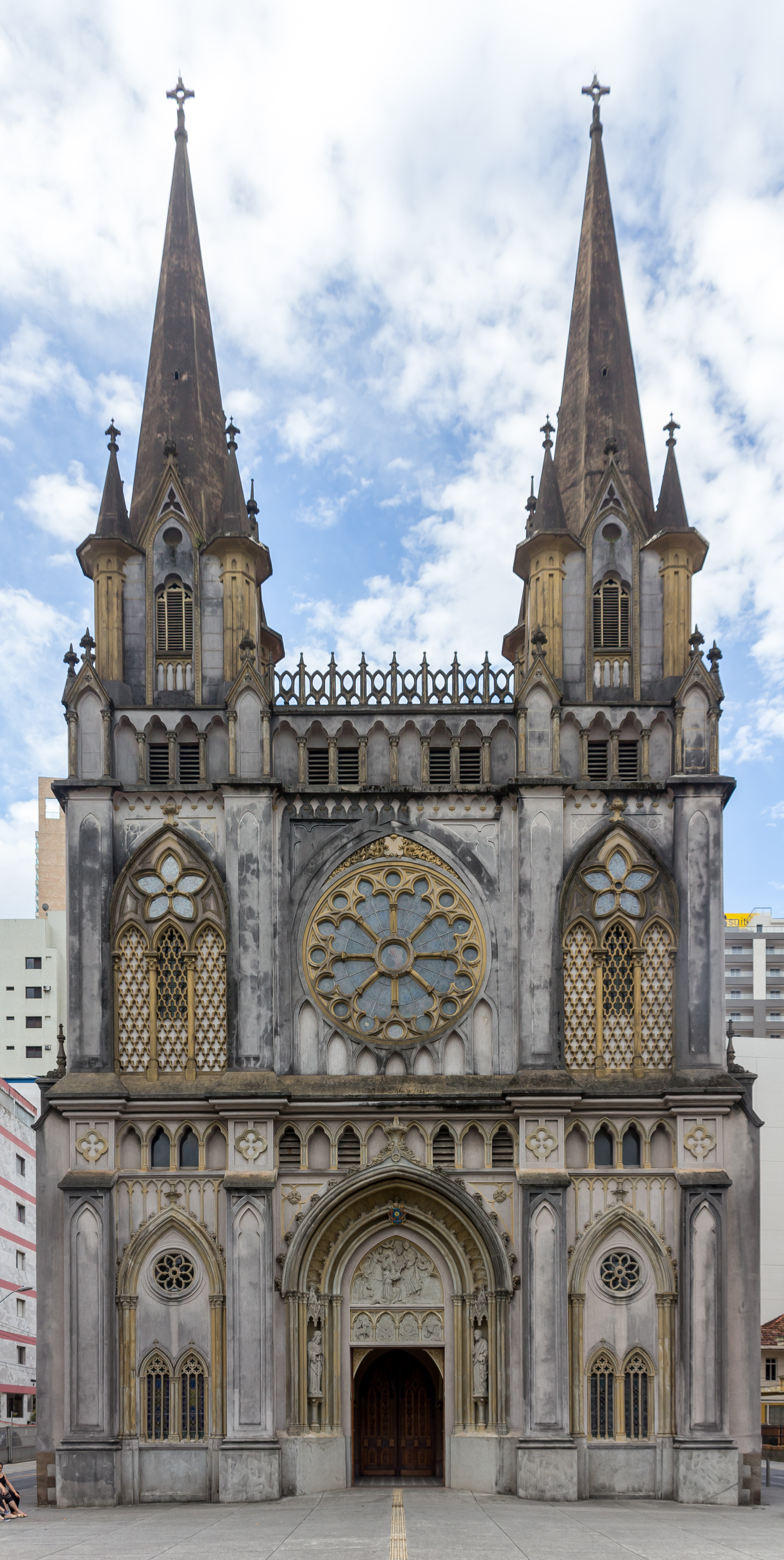
- Basilica of St. Anthony
- 23°58′27″S 46°19′12″W
- Location: Santos
- Country: Brazil
- Denomination: Roman Catholic Church

The Basilica of St. Anthony (Portuguese: Basílica Santo Antônio do Embaré) Also Basilica of Santos It is a Catholic church inaugurated in 1945 in the city of Santos, São Paulo in the south of Brazil, that was built in the style of neo-Gothic architecture.

The basilica originates in the small chapel built in the middle of 1874 by Antonio Ferreira da Silva, then Baron de Embaré. After his death, the chapel was abandoned for twenty years, when it was rebuilt and inaugurated in 1911. In 1915, it expanded, becoming the church. It was delivered in 1922 to the Capuchin friars, who started the new building in 1930, when they placed the cornerstone that would lead to the current basilica, which finally opened in 1945 and was elevated to the category of basilica by Pope Pius XII in 1952.

== See also ==
- Roman Catholicism in Brazil
- Basilica of St. Anthony of Padua

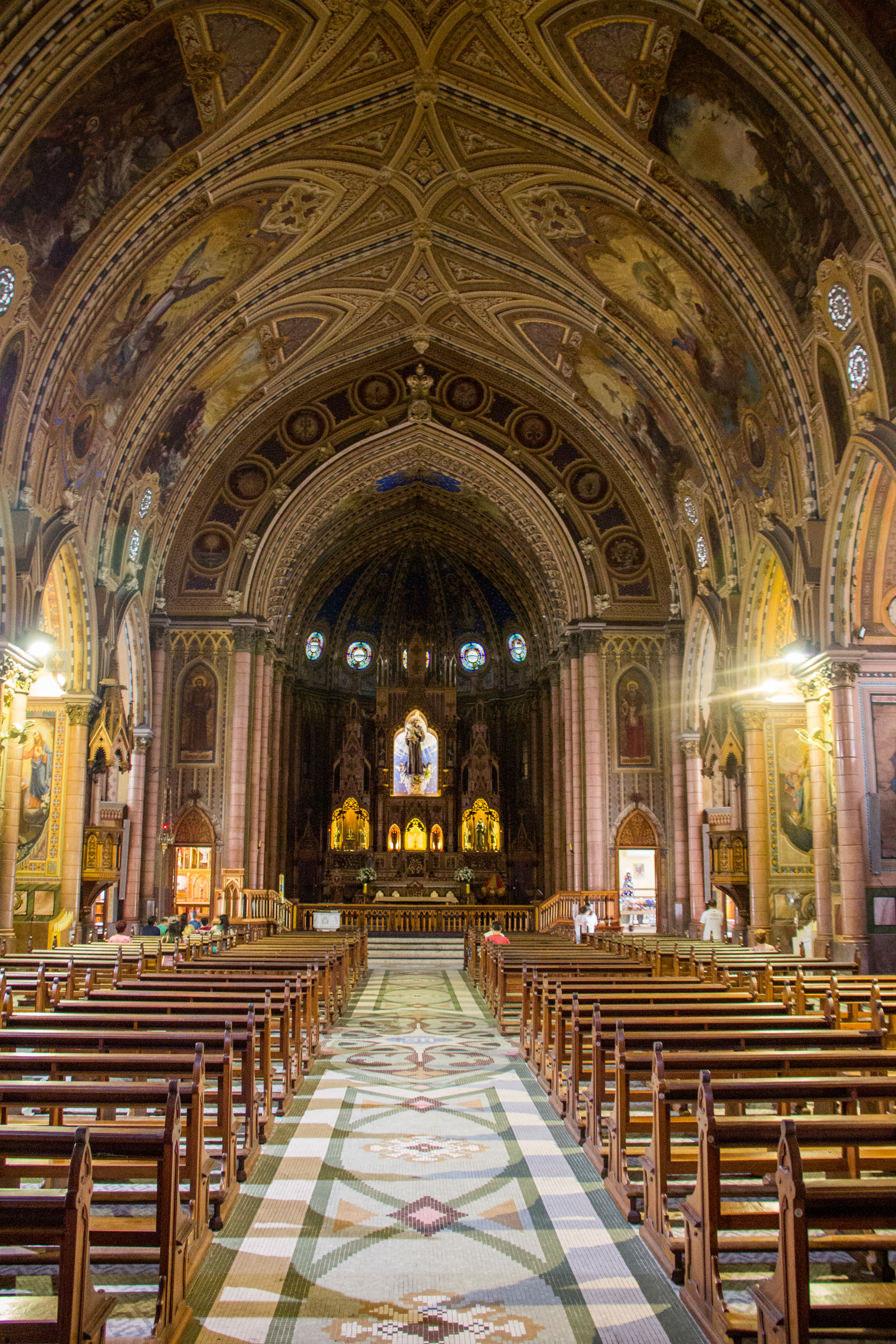
Internal View
