= Basilica of Saint Joseph Oriol =

- Església de Sant Josep Oriol
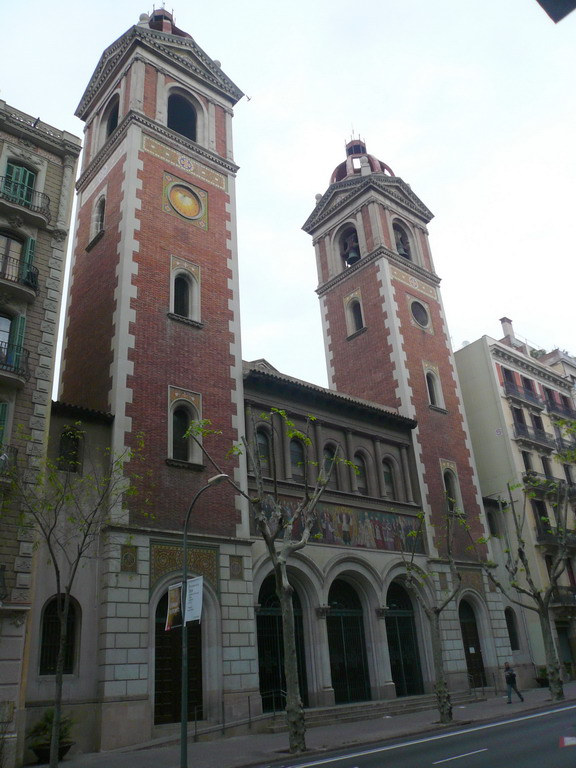

- Location within Barcelona
- 41°23′1″N 2°9′28″E
- Location: Barcelona
- Country: Spain
- Denomination: Catholic

History
- Status: Basilica
- Dedication: Saint Joseph Oriol

Administration
- Archdiocese: Barcelona

The Basilica of Saint Joseph Oriol is a basilica in Barcelona, Catalonia.

== History ==
Construction of the church began in 1915, under the architect Enric Sagnier. The church was officially opened in 1926 although the works of the clock tower and facade were not completed until 1930. On 15 May 1936 it received the title of minor basilica granted by Pope Pius XI. It was the fifth church of Barcelona to receive this title.

The church was burned in July 1936, and was rebuilt after the end of the Spanish Civil War. The reconstruction of the temple was slow, taking about 12 years.
