= St. Stephen's Church, Katowice =

Church building in Katowice, Poland

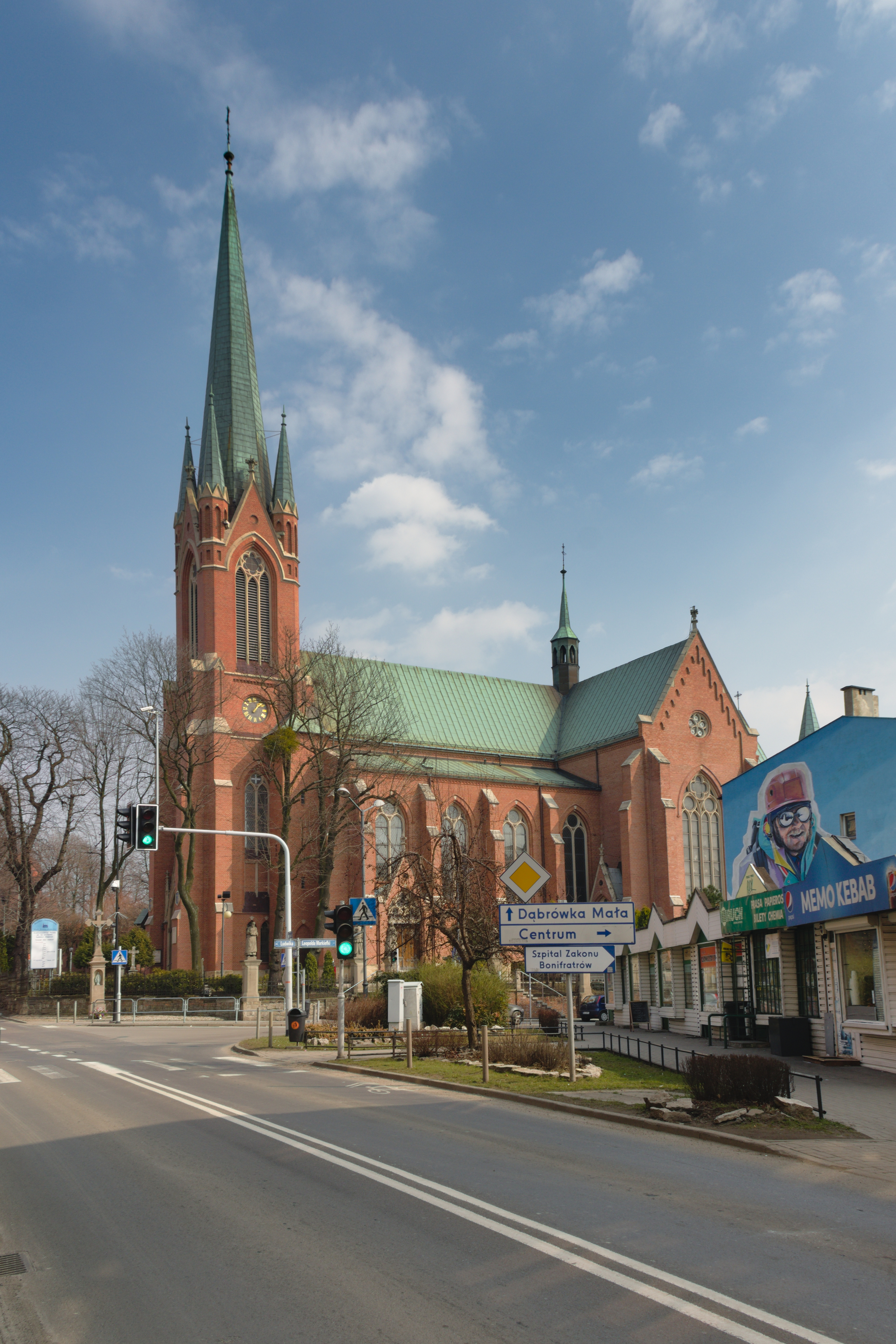
St. Stephen's Church, Katowice in 2021

The Kościół św. Szczepana or Saint Stephen's Church is a church in Katowice, Silesian Voivodship, Poland. It is dedicated to Saint Stephen and located at 50°16′9″N 19°2′17″E on Leopold Markiefki street.

Ludwik Skowronek initiated the building of new church in the Bogucice neighbourhood to replace St. Dorothea's church; it was finished by 1894 and on October 25 of the same year it was consecrated by Cardinal Georg Kopp. The building was designed by the architect Paweł Jackisch.

In 1994 the church was painted. At its 100th birthday, all former priests visited the church. In July 2006 the Calvari altar was renovated.
