= Cathedral Basilica of Our Lady of Peace, Lomas de Zamora =

Coordinates: 34.7583°S 58.4025°W

Cathedral Basilica of Our Lady of Peace
- Catedral de Nuestra Señora de la Paz
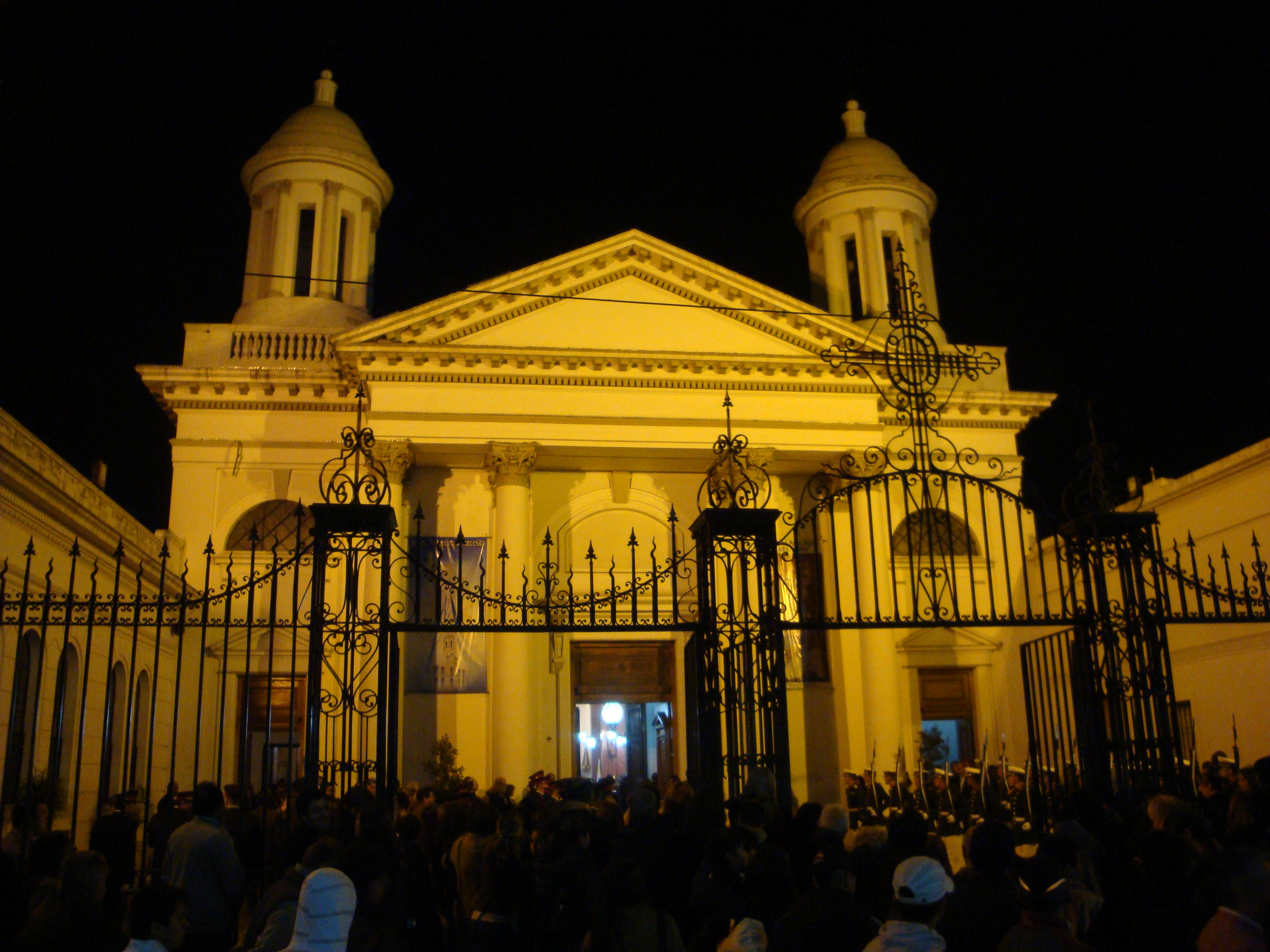
- Cathedral Basilica of Our Lady of Peace
- Location: Lomas de Zamora
- Country: Argentina
- Denomination: Roman Catholic Church

The Cathedral Basilica of Our Lady of Peace (Spanish: Catedral de Nuestra Señora de la Paz), also called Lomas de Zamora Cathedral is a Catholic church located in the central square of the city of Lomas de Zamora, in Argentina under the patronage of Our Lady of Peace.

Its terrain, like the Grigera Square and the Municipality, was donated by Victorio Grigera in 1860. The first phase of construction started on January 16 of that year, by the Nicolás and José Canale architects. The cornerstone of the building was laid by Bartolomé Mitre. Its opening was completed on January 22, 1865, while construction of the transept, the dome and the current sanctuary began in 1898, under the supervision of the architects Juan Ochoa and Domingo Selva, concluding on January 24, 1900.

To mark its centenary, in 1965, it was declared a Minor Basilica by Pope Paul VI.

== See also ==
- Roman Catholicism in Argentina
- Cathedral Basilica of Our Lady of Peace
