= Basilica of Our Lady of the Snows, Iguape =

Coordinates: 24.7096°S 47.5560°W

Basilica of Our Lady of the Snows
- Basílica Nossa Senhora das Neves
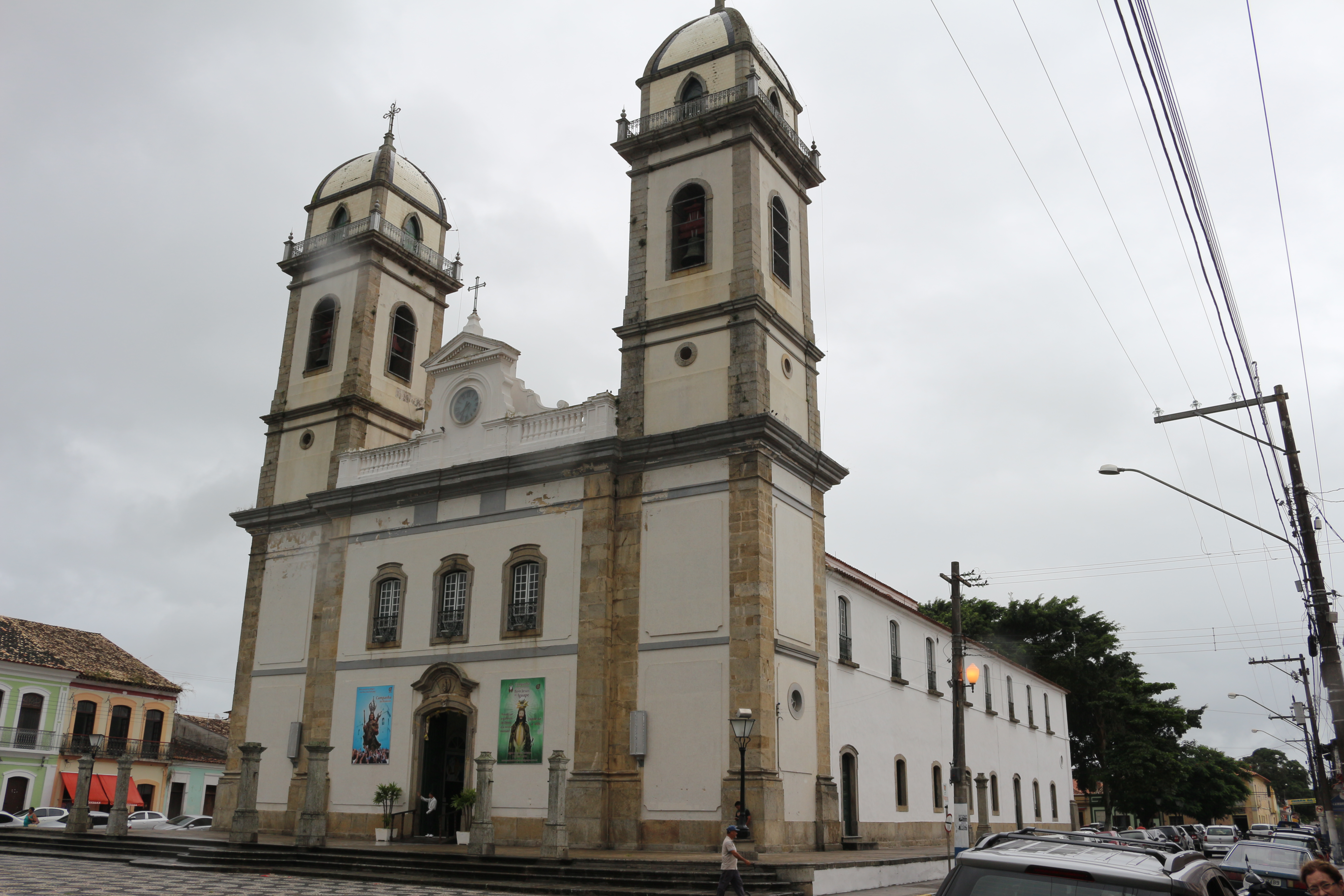
- Basilica of Our Lady of the Snows
- Location: Iguape
- Country: Brazil
- Denomination: Roman Catholic Church

The Basilica of Our Lady of the Snows (Portuguese: Basílica Nossa Senhora das Neves; Santuário do Senhor Bom Jesus de Iguape) Also Basilica of Iguape It is a religious building affiliated with the Catholic Church that is located in the city of Iguape in the state of Sao Paulo in the south of the South American country of Brazil. It was built in Portuguese stone, mortar and whale oil, Between the eighteenth and nineteenth centuries. There you can see several images, including those of the patrons of the city, the Virgin of the Snows and the Good Jesus of Iguape.

In the basilica you can also visit the Hall of Miracles, which has objects left by the devotees in gratitude to the received graces. It has the triple condition of parochial church, Catholic sanctuary and minor basilica declared as such on November 29, 1962, under the pontificate of Pope John XXIII.

== See also ==
- Roman Catholicism in Brazil
