= Mar del Plata Cathedral =

- Cathedral Basilica of SS Peter and Cecilia
- Catedral de los Santos Pedro y Cecilia
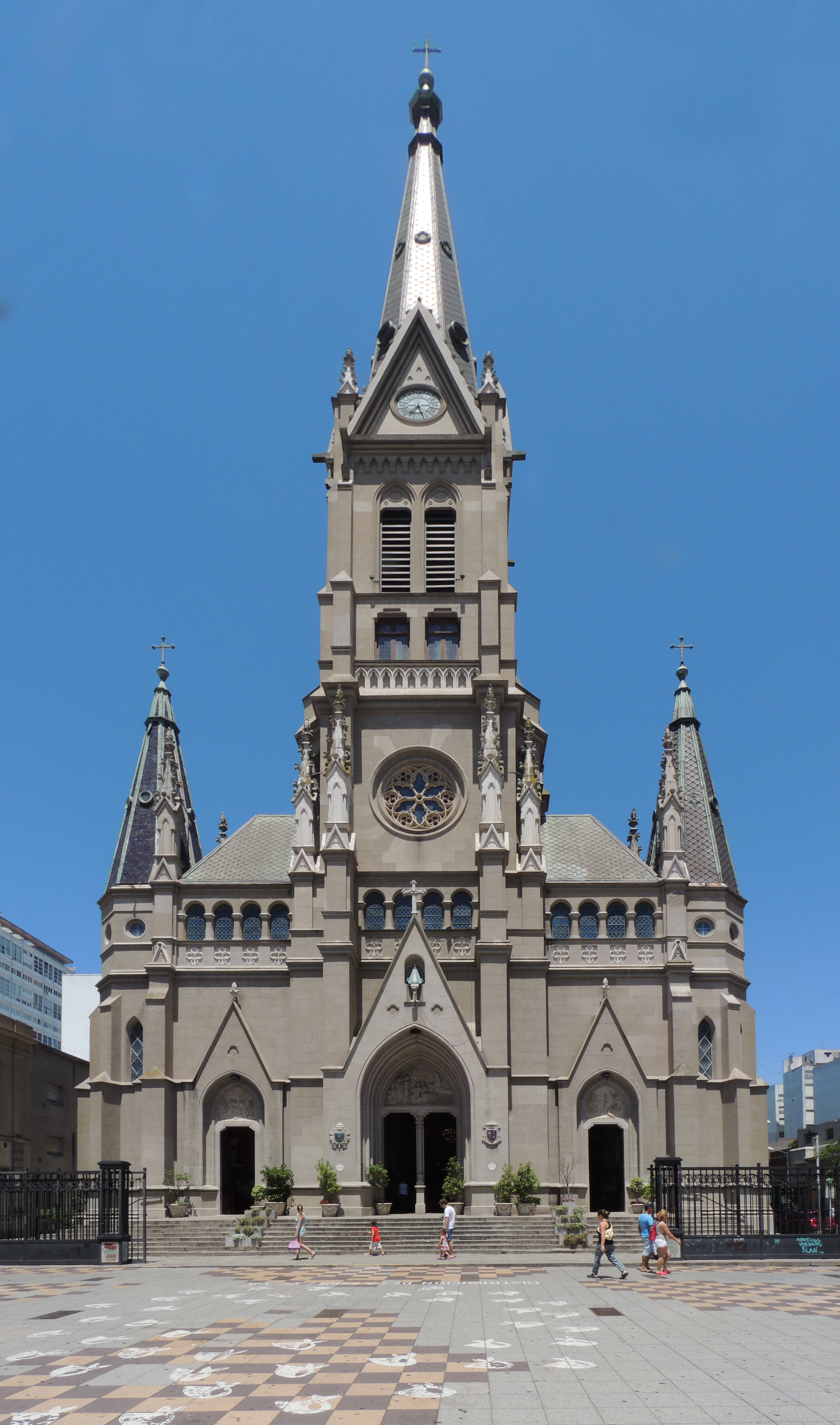
- Mar del Plata Cathedral
- 37°59′57″S 57°32′57″W
- Location: Mar del Plata, Buenos Aires
- Country: Argentina
- Denomination: Roman Catholic
- Website: http://www.catedralmardelplata.org.ar

Architecture
- Functional status: Active
- Architect: Pedro Benoit
- Style: Neogothic
- Groundbreaking: 1893
- Completed: 1905

Specifications
- Length: 67 meters (220 ft)
- Width: 20 meters (66 ft)

Administration
- Archdiocese: Roman Catholic Diocese of Mar del Plata

The Cathedral Basilica of SS Peter and Cecilia (Spanish: Basílica Catedral de los Santos Pedro y Cecilia) is a Roman Catholic church building in Mar del Plata, Argentina.

Built in Neogothic style, it is dedicated to St. Peter the Apostle and St. Cecilia.

Declared a minor basilica by Pius XI in 1924, upon the creation of the Roman Catholic Diocese of Mar del Plata in 1957 it became its cathedral church.
