= Outeiro (Bragança) =

- Civil parish
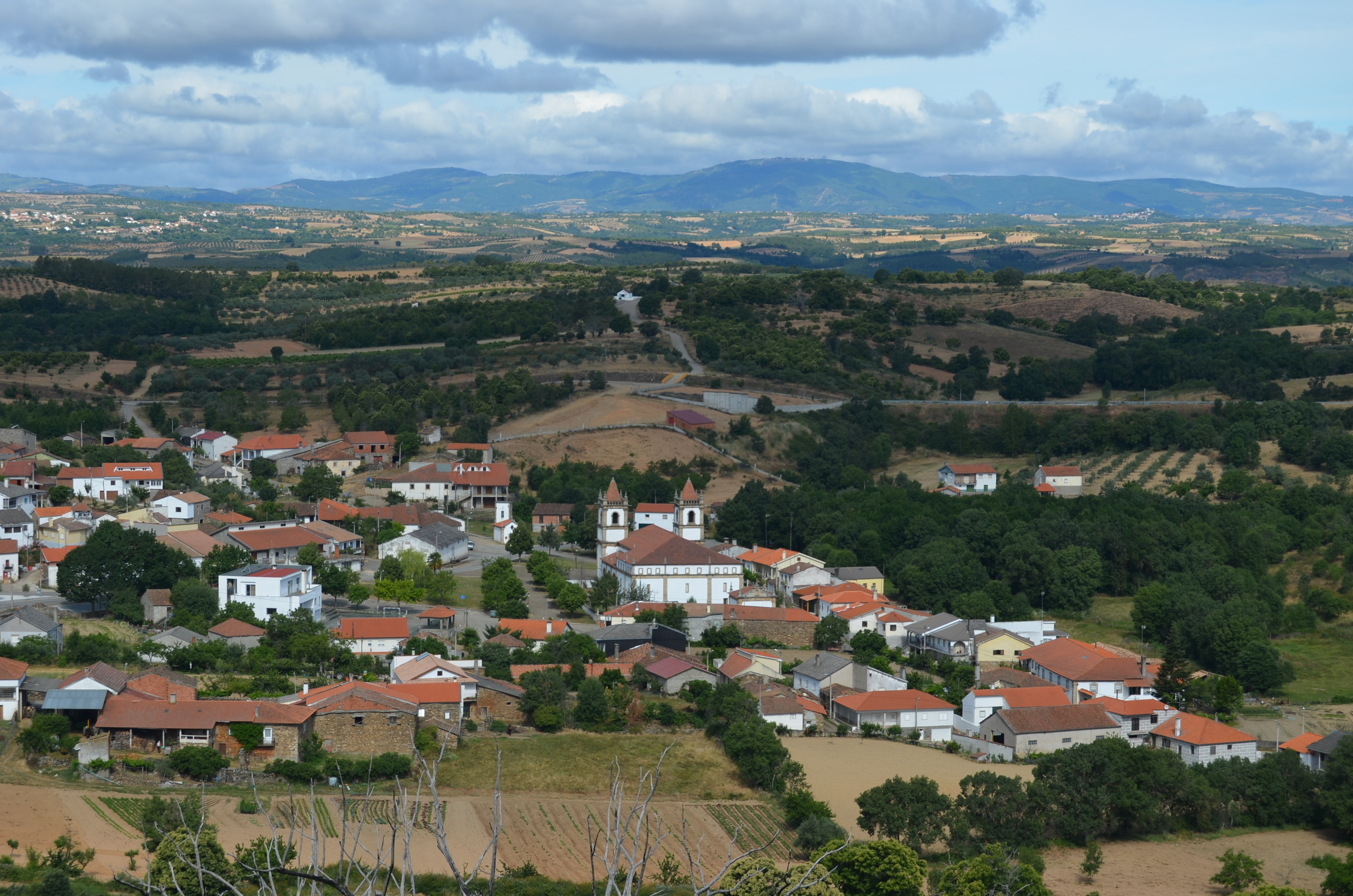
- A view over Outeiro

- Location in Portugal
- Coordinates: 41.683°N 6.600°W
- Country: Portugal
- Region: Norte
- Intermunic. comm.: Terras de Trás-os-Montes
- District: Bragança
- Municipality: Bragança

Area
  - Total: 40.93 km^{2} (15.80 sq mi)

Population (2011)
  - Total: 301
  - Density: 7.35/km^{2} (19.0/sq mi)
- Time zone: UTC+00:00 (WET)
  - Summer (DST): UTC+01:00 (WEST)

Outeiro is a civil parish in the municipality of Bragança, Portugal. The population in 2011 was 301, in an area of 40.93 km^{2} (15.80 sq mi).
