= Basilica of St. Sebastian, Salvador =

Basilica of St. Sebastian
- Basílica de São Sebastião
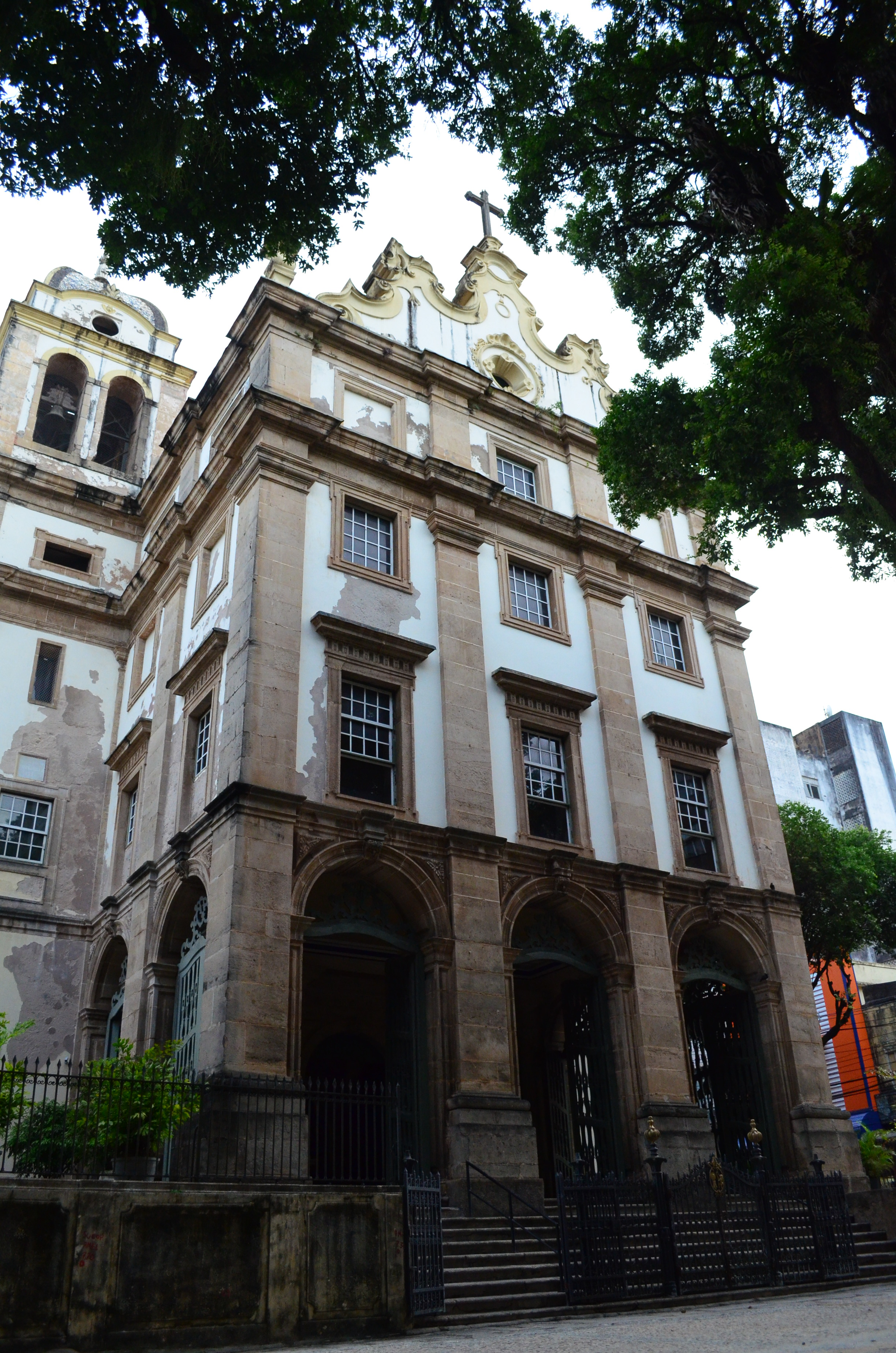
- Facade of the Basilica of St. Sebastian

- Location of the Basilica of St. Sebastian in Brazil

Religion
- Affiliation: Catholic
- Rite: Roman

Location
- Municipality: Salvador
- State: Bahia
- Country: Brazil
- Interactive map of Basilica of St. Sebastian
- Coordinates: 12.979285°S 38.514188°W

Architecture
- Style: Neoclassical

The Basilica of St. Sebastian (Portuguese: Basílica de São Sebastião) Also Basilica of Salvador It is the name given to a neoclassical religious building affiliated with the Catholic Church that functions as the abbey church of the Monastery of St. Benedict (Mosteiro de São Bento), in Salvador in Bahia, Brazil.

== Description ==
Founded in 1582, the monastery is located on Sete de Setembro Avenue in Salvador, in the jurisdiction of the Parish of Sao Pedro. The current abbot is Don Emanoel D'Able do Amaral.

The church that follows the Roman or Latin rite was declared basilica minor in 1982 by decision of Pope John Paul II. It underwent a process of remodeling and was closed about 11 months during 2006. It is managed by the Congregation of the Benedictines of Brazil.

== Protected status ==
The Basilica of St. Sebastian was listed as a historic structure by the National Institute of Historic and Artistic Heritage in 1938. It is listed in the Book of Historical Works process no. 79-T, inscription no. 148. It is also part of the UNESCO World Heritage Site of the Historic Center of the city of Salvador, a designation received in 1985.

== See also ==
- Roman Catholicism in Brazil
- St. Sebastian

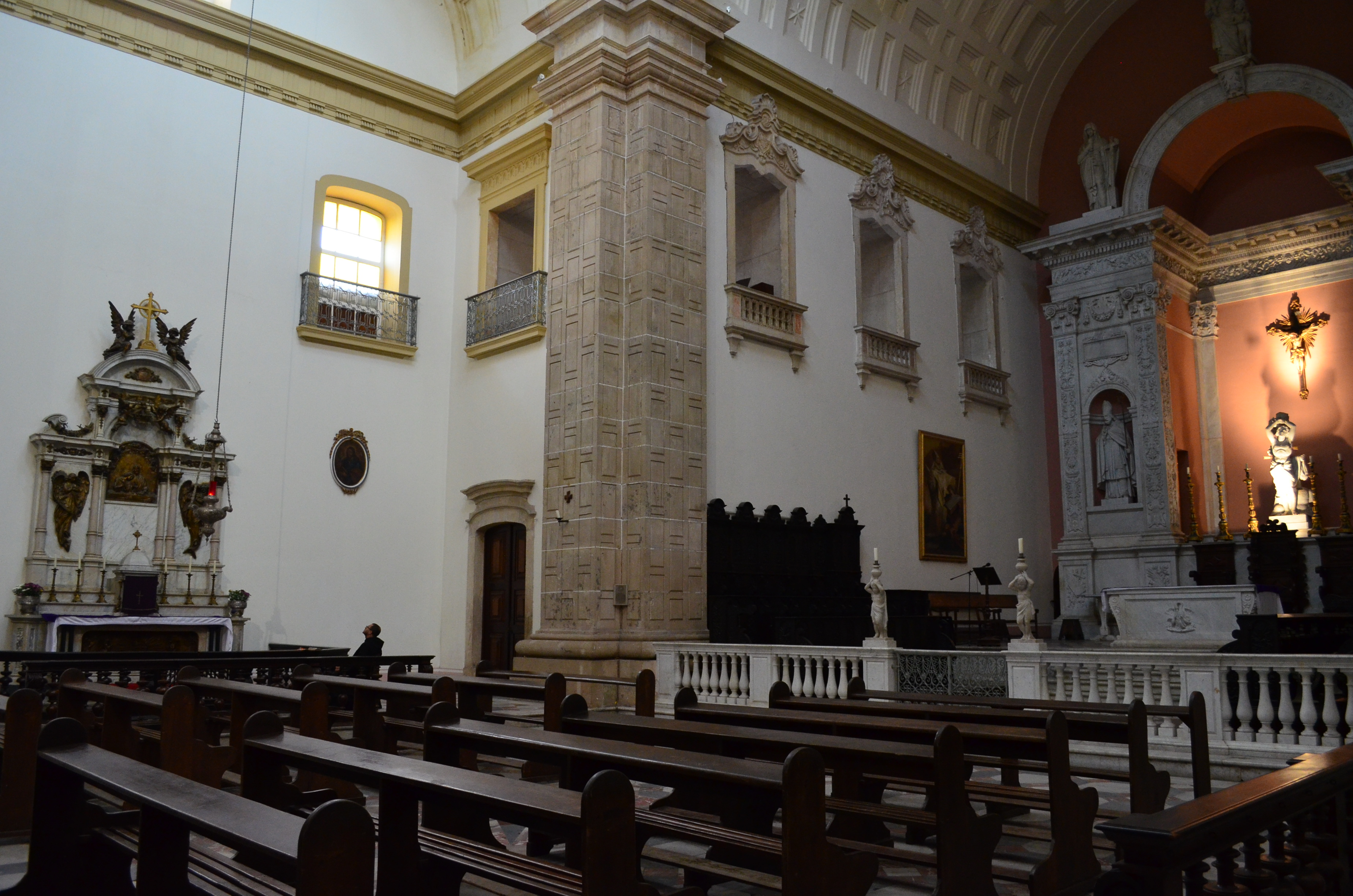
Internal View
