= Caravaca de la Cruz =

- Municipality
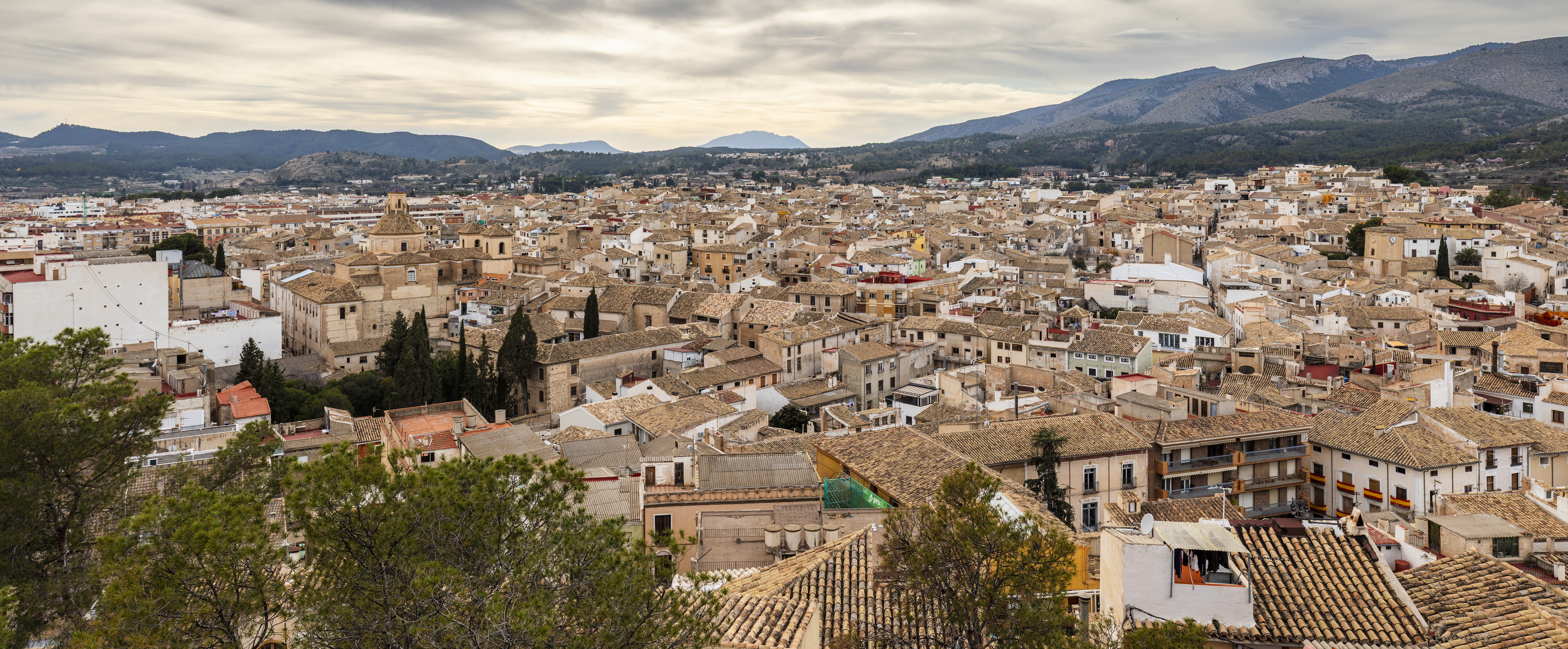
- Panorama of Caravaca

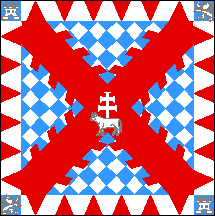
- Flag Coat of arms
- Interactive map of Caravaca de la Cruz
- Coordinates: 38°06′27″N 1°51′36″W
- Country: Spain
- Autonomous community: Region of Murcia

Government
  - Alcalde: José Francisco García (PP)

Area
  - Total: 859 km^{2} (332 sq mi)
- Elevation: 800 m (2,600 ft)

Population (2025-01-01)
  - Total: 26,126
  - Density: 30.4/km^{2} (78.8/sq mi)
- Demonym(s): Caravaqueño, ña
- Time zone: UTC+1 (CET)
  - Summer (DST): UTC+2 (CEST)
- Postal code: 30400
- Website: Official website

Caravaca de la Cruz (Spanish: [kaɾaˈβaka ðe la ˈkɾuθ]), often shortened to Caravaca, is a town and municipality of Spain belonging to the Region of Murcia. The town is located on the left (northern) bank of the Argos, a tributary of the Segura in the southeastern Iberian Peninsula. It has a population of 26,449 as of 2010 (INE).

It is the fifth Holy City of Catholic Christianity, having been granted the papal privilege of celebrating a jubilee year in perpetuity in 1998. It celebrates its jubilee every seven years.

Caravaca is dominated by the Basilica of Vera Cruz. It houses the Cross of Caravaca, a relic that, according to Christian tradition, is believed to be a fragment of the True Cross. It is attributed miraculous properties, and celebrated with a feast day every 3 May. The cultural festival surrounding this liturgical occasion, held between 1 and 5 May of each year, has been declared of International Tourist Interest in 2004. Along with processions and parades of Moors and Christians, the celebration of Los Caballos del Vino is especially relevant, which now aspires to be listed as an Intangible Cultural Heritage of Humanity by UNESCO.

The Neoclassical painter Rafael Tejeo was born in Caravaca.

Caravaca is home to other monuments and museums. The hills which extend to the north are rich in marble and iron, while the town itself has been a considerable industrial centre, with large iron-works, tanneries and paper, chocolate and oil factories. A large archeological site was found in January 2009, comprising 1,300 graves dating from 2400 to 1950 BC.

== History ==
Scarcely mentioned during the Islamic rule over Sharq al-Andalus, Caravaca seems to have been a small settlement (qarya) dependent of Mula from the 10th to the 12th centuries.

After the Treaty of Alcaraz (1243), the territory became part of a Castilian protectorate for roughly two decades. Muslim inhabitants were dispossessed in the wake of the Mudéjar Revolt (1264–66). The Order of the Temple held control over the place as a part of a bailiwick from 1266 to 1285, when it became a realengo ('royal demesne') holding, before returning to the Knights Templar at some point before the order was effectively dissolved, thereby becoming a realengo again. Consolidated as territory near the border with the Kingdom of Granada, the main ways of life for a part of the population were husbandry (sheep and goats) and frontier skirmishes as land dedicated to cereal crops and vines was reduced in size. Over the course of the Middle Ages, Caravaca sought to annex the land of the smaller town of Cehegín. Caravaca was gifted to the Order of Santiago in 1344.

== Museums ==
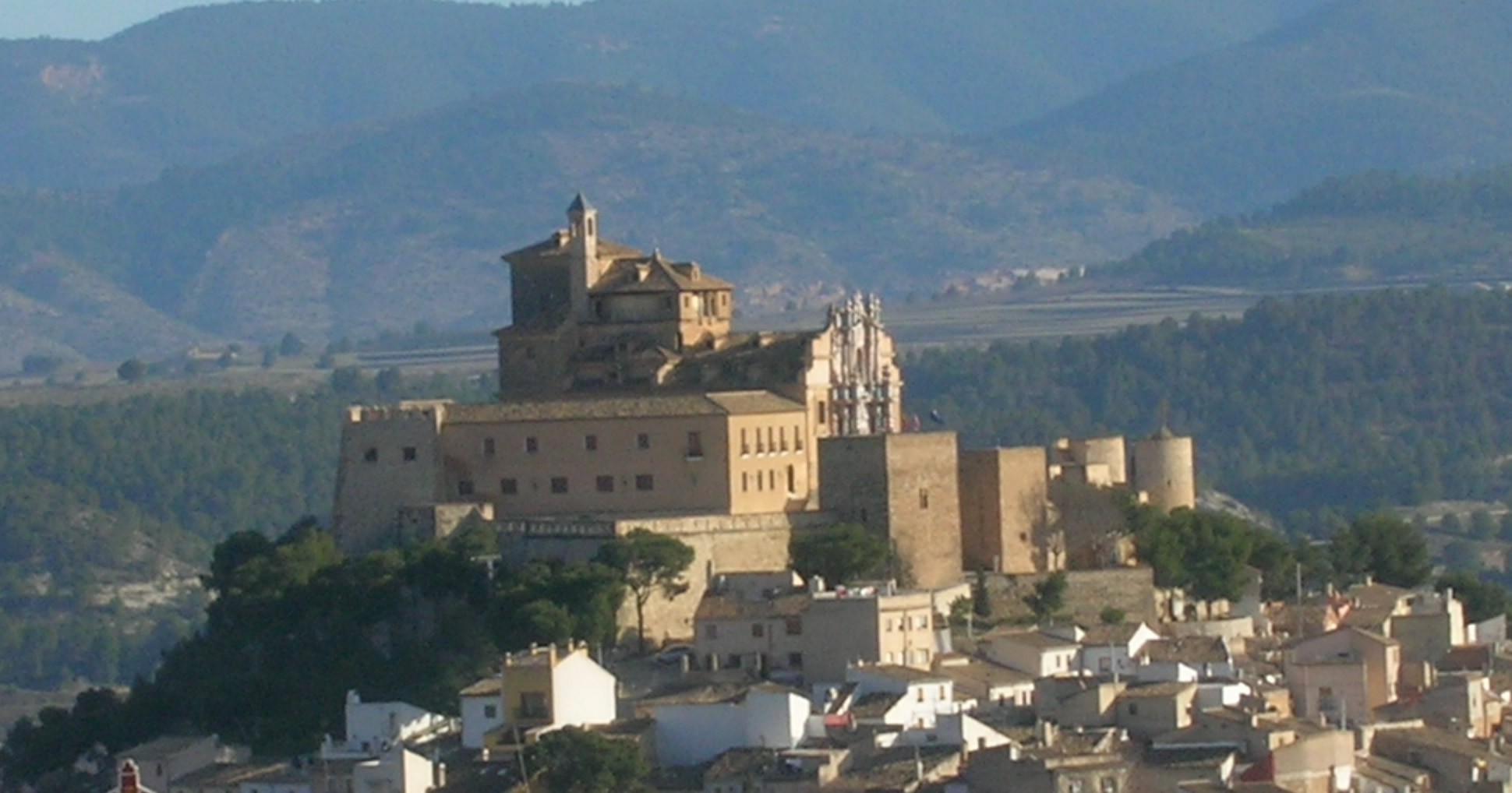
Castle and Basilica of the Holy Cross

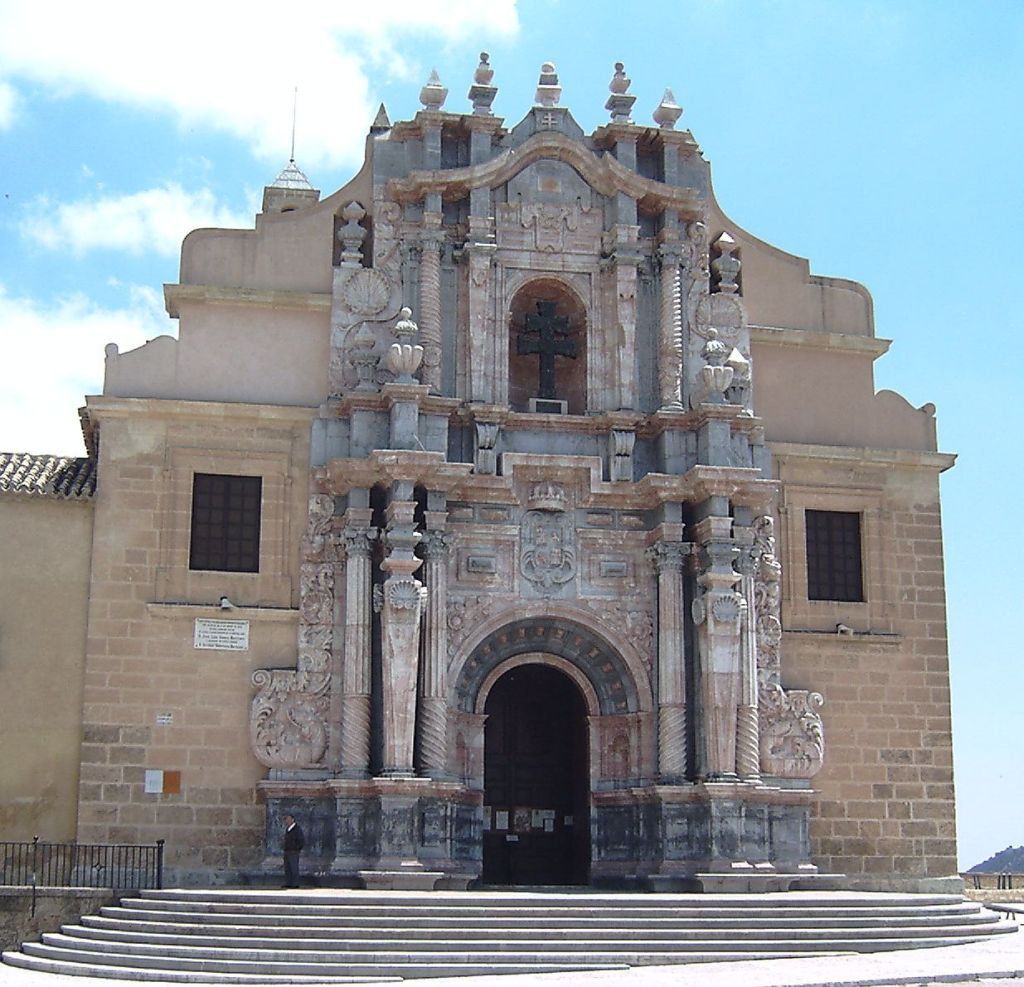
Baroque façade of the Basilica

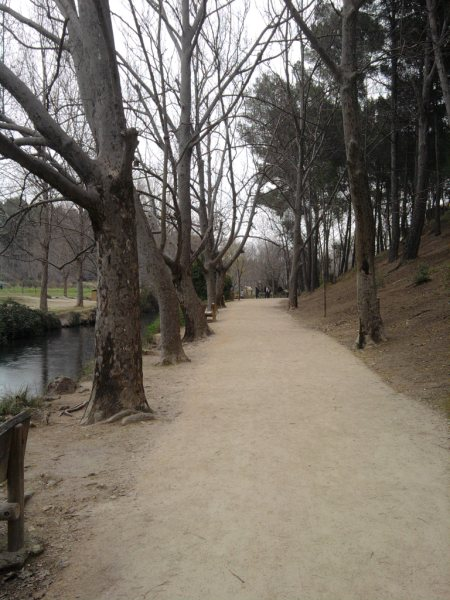
Fuentes del Marques nature reserve

- Museo de la Vera Cruz. Inside of the Castle of Santa Cruz.
- Museo de la Fiesta. Relative to the festivities in honor of the Santisima y Vera Cruz de Caravaca.
- Museo José Carrilero. It houses a collection of sculptures.
- Museo Arqueológico Municipal la Soledad
- Museo de música étnica de Barranda
- Museo Etnográfico en Miniatura "Angel Reinón"

== Monuments ==
- Castle and Basilica of Vera Cruz, where they worship the Cross of Caravaca. Located within the Real Alcázar of Islamic origins;
- Iglesia Parroquial de "El Salvador", one of the finest examples of Renaissance architecture in the region of Murcia (16th century);
- Church of the Holy Conception, with a large tower, within which highlights its coffered ceiling of painted wood (16th century);
- Church of the Jesuits, that is currently used as municipal cultural center (17th century);
- Carmelite Convent and Church Mothers of St. Joseph, of rococo style;
- Discalced Carmelite Convent (founded by St. John of the Cross in 1586);
- Church and Convent of Santa Clara, founded in 1609;
- City Hall, Baroque, and whose original layout corresponds to Jaime Bort;
- The "Templete", Baroque-style building and hexagonal inscribed in a circle, which marks the bath Santisima y Vera Cruz de Caravaca each 3 May, ritual act that has been celebrated since 1384;
- The Plaza de Toros, built on a former Franciscan friary, which opened in 1880 and was added with the renovation of 1926, a front neomudejar;
- Several monuments Valencian sculptor Rafael Pi Belda: A San Juan de la Cruz (1983), The Moor and Christian (1986), Via Crucis (2000, Royal Basilica Santuario de la Vera Cruz de Caravaca), a work commemorating the award the Holy See of the Jubilee Year in perpetuity to the Basilica Santuario de la Vera Cruz de Caravaca (2001) and the Horses of Wine (2007). There are more sculptures of other artists as Antonio Campillo Párraga and José Carrilero Gil;
- The Medieval District (around the castle);
- Calle Mayor, Calle de las Monjas, Calle de Rafael Tejeo, Calle Puentecilla, etc. are old streets in Caravaca with examples of houses with the typical coat of arms.

== Notable people ==
- Mista, retired footballer
- José Manuel Martínez Toral, (born 29 October 1960), is a Spanish retired footballer
- Rafael Tegeo, (November 1798 – October 1856) was a Spanish painter in the Neoclassic style
- Luis Leante, (born 6 June 1963), commonly known as Luis Leante, is a Spanish novelist and Latin professor.
- Mari Trini, (July 1947 – April 2009), singer-songwriter.

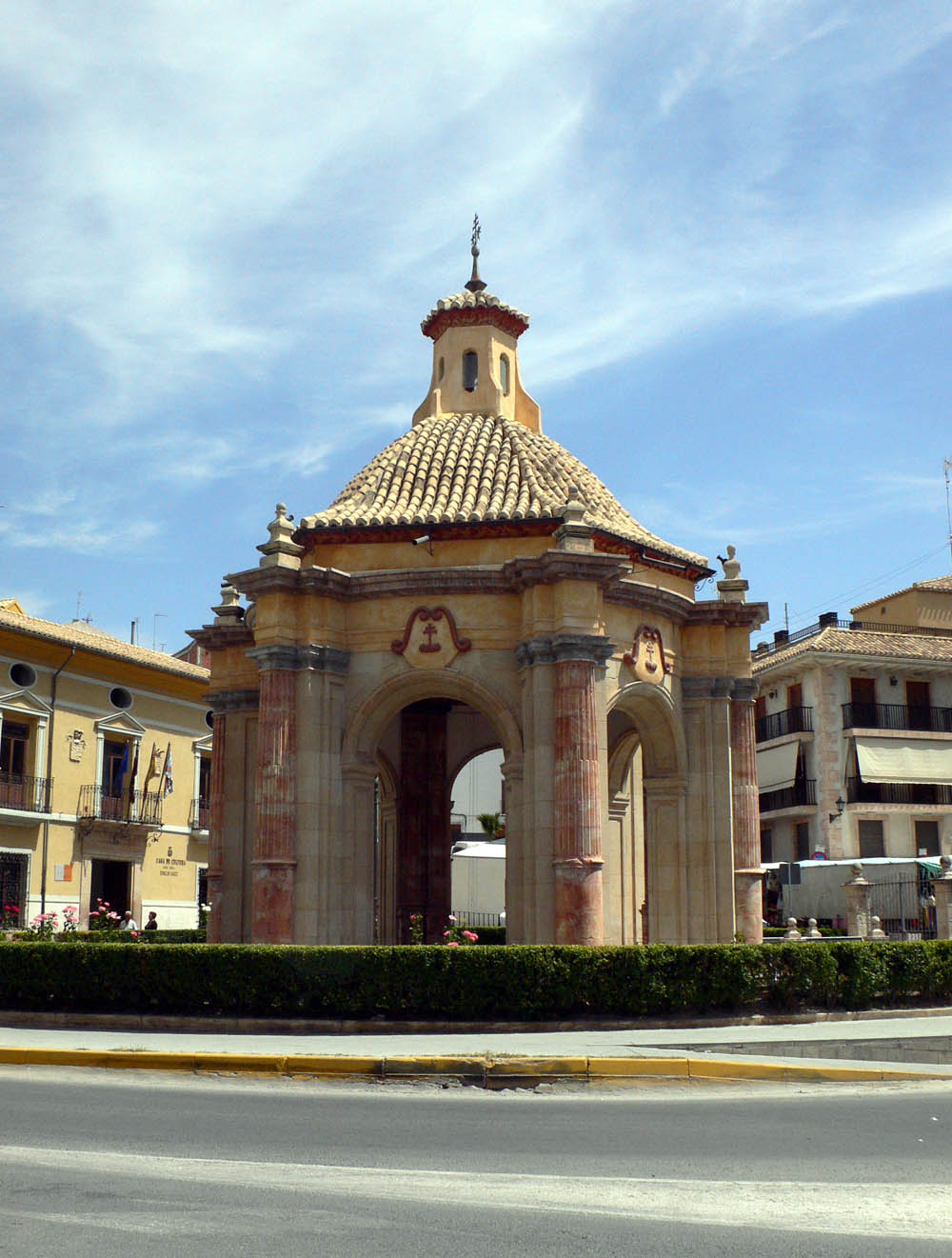
Templete

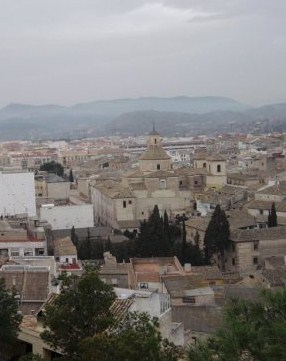
Church of the Jesuits

== Festivities ==
The festivities in honor of the Santisima y Vera Cruz de Caravaca were declared of International Tourist Interest in November 2004, held from 1 to 5 May. It includes the following acts:

- Competition Southeast Migas. "Night of the crumbs." - 30th of April
- Bareback horse contest. - 1st of May
- Processions accompanying the Cruz de Moros y Cristianos - 2nd and 3rd of May
- Fiesta de la Santisima y Vera Cruz - 3rd of May
- Moors and Christians parade - 4th of May
- Procession of the Holy and Vera Cruz. - 5th of May

== Legend of the Holy Cross and the May Festival ==
In the year 1231 (or 1232 by some accounts), a miracle occurred in Caravaca, while it was still under the control of Muslim ruler Zeyt-Abuzeyt. Christian missionary Gínes Pérez Chirinos de Cuenca was captured and taken before the Muslim ruler, who was curious about aspects of Christianity. In particular, he was interested in the celebration of the Last Supper, and so asked the missionary to demonstrate the procedure for the Mass. The priest was reluctant to profane the Blessed Sacrament, as at the time only the Faithful could be present at the liturgy. Nevertheless, he agreed and the king arranged for all necessary items to be prepared: an altar draped with a pall, sacramental bread and sacramental wine, and the right number of altar candles. One important object was lacking: an altar crucifix. Don Gínes explained it was essential to the service that a cross be placed on the altar, and he could not properly say Mass without one. The king exclaimed: "So what is that?" and pointed to something in the window. From Heaven came two angels bearing a cross, which they placed on the altar before vanishing.

The priest continued the Mass, where according to Catholic theology, the bread and wine become the True Body and Blood of Jesus Christ (as per the doctrine of transubstantiation), even while retaining their original sensory qualities. As the missionary was saying the Consecration prayers that effected this change, the king saw a beautiful Baby instead of the Host. The king was so taken aback by this miracle that he and his family converted to Christianity and asked for Baptism. Many believe that the cross delivered by the angels contained a piece of the True Cross.

Centuries later, after Christopher Columbus set sail on his voyage of discovery (1492) Franciscan friars travelled to the Americas, taking copies of the Caravaca Cross with them. The design is still commonly seen in Central and South American churches and monasteries. Houses and business premises also have copies pinned to the wall like lucky charms, and may be surrounded by a lucky horseshoe.

This legend of the appearance of the Cross is remembered by the people of Caravaca each year with festivities. The May celebrations honouring the Holy Cross combine culture, religion, history, and entertainment in which all citizens and visitors participate. In 1998 Caravaca de la Cruz became the fifth Holy City (along with Santiago de Compostela, Santo Toribio de Liébana, Rome and Jerusalem) celebrating the Perpetual Jubilee in the Vera Cruz Sanctuary (Sanctuario de la Vera Cruz), where the Cross of Caravaca is kept.

The Caravaca Cross shows a Corpus on a Patriarchal Cross, often flanked by two angels. In most Patriarchal Crosses, the smaller, upper bar normally represents the Titulus Crucis; the Caravaca Cross is unusual in that the arms of the corpus are nailed to it rather than the lower bar. The power of the Cross of Caravaca is in its original meaning and foremost representation of a religious value that was the maintaining starting point of other values. Without the religious symbolism, the Cross had not had the importance and character development in its history. Secular symbols usually do not cause the same force as religious symbols, which are the meeting place of a transcendent reality and other material.

The Caravaca Cross is the symbol of a city, protecting and giving strength to all its people. It provides a deep feeling of community to all caravaqueños, and it also reaches deep into the heart of the pilgrims who come to visit the Shrine. For almost eight centuries of pilgrims' worship it was guarded by the Knights Templar, and later by the Order of Santiago. The Cross also has other connotations and considerations. The historical experiences and experiences of identity accumulated over time have provided it with an emotional function for the local community and for many people elsewhere.

== "Los Caballos del Vino" ==
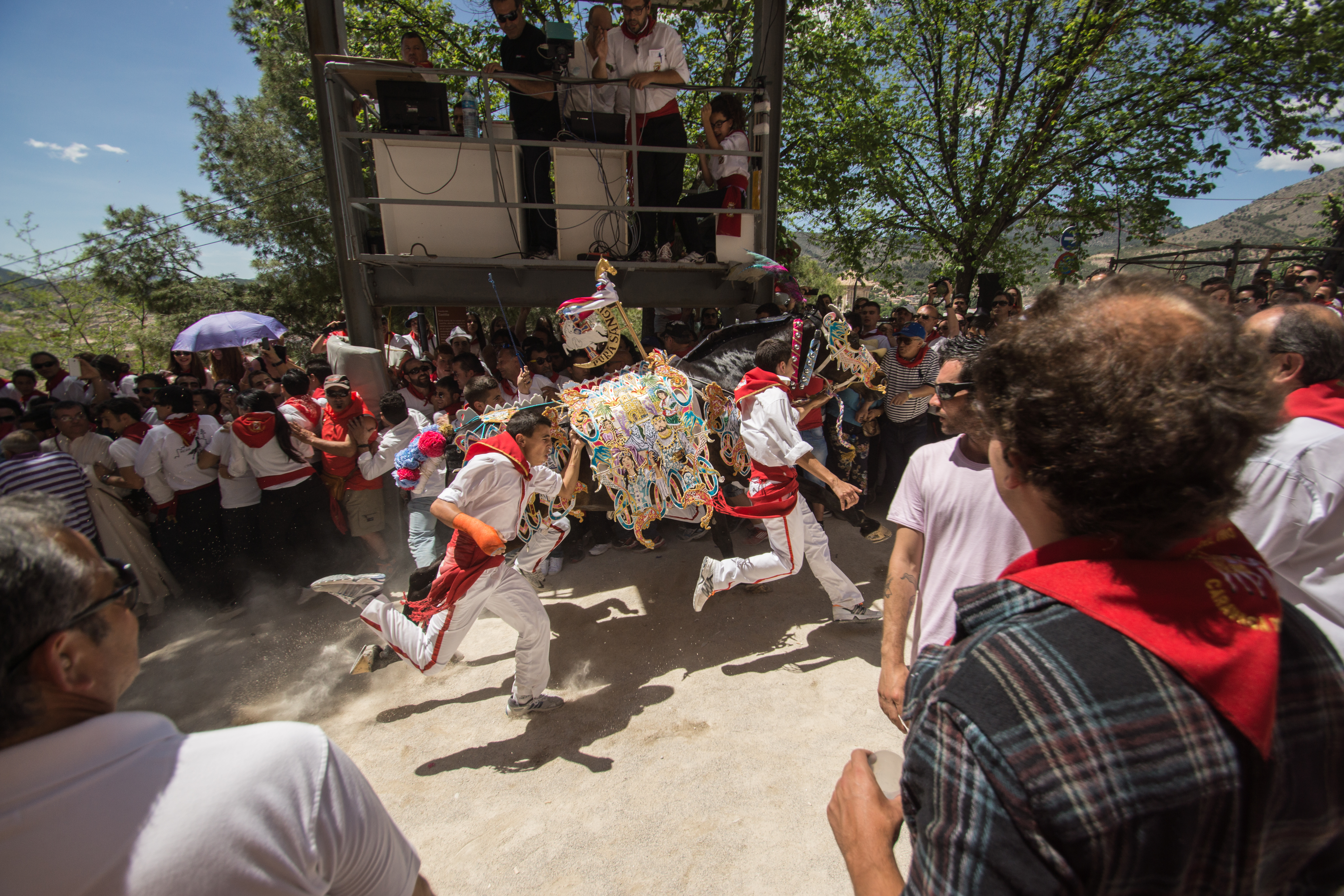
Fiesta de Los Caballos del Vino in 2014

Festivity of Caballos del Vino is a celebration "Unique, unusual and passionate" as defined by the writer Ballester on one of his books and is celebrated on 2 May. The horses come together to Moors and Christians, the Fiestas de Caravaca de la Cruz are held from 1 to 5 May in honor of the patron saint of the village, the Blessed and Vera Cruz de Caravaca. The horses came from Caravaca de la Cruz, on 2 May was done with the streets of the city with its splendid robes embroidered in silk and gold, and the spectacular career of the horses came on the slope of the castle. The horses came roaring burst and annually in the spring of Caravaca, on 2 May, opening wide the gates of the festival every year is dedicated to the Blessed. Cruz Caravaca, Murcia Northwest particular corner. A display of fantasy and symbolism. Cult given the strength, value, beauty and the senses. The origins of the festival are lost in the mists of time blending between history and legend.

The town passed to the Knights Templar who, in the 13th century, built the castle that still dominates the town today. At one time, the Knights Templar and townsfolk were under siege by the Muslim army and took refuge in the castle. It wasn't long before the water stored in the castle became unpotable and several of the refugees became ill. Scouts crept out of the castle at night to look for water but found the neighboring wells had been poisoned. In desperation, the scouts raced out of the castle on horses to find a safe source of water. They found some wine, loaded the wineskins on their horses and raced back to the castle. The wine was blessed in the presence the Caravaca Cross and served to those who had been debilitated by the bad water. They recovered immediately and the blessed wine was mixed with the toxic water in the storage tanks. The water became fresh and as a result, the Christians were able to resist the enemy.

Today, an annual fiesta is held in the town to remember those events, which includes a ceremony to bless the irrigation water used by Caravaca farmers. Before offering and sprucing women to young men and horses richly embroidered robes and bouquets of flowers, considering, in this way, heroes and saviors of the situation. Since the Middle Ages, in more or less splendor, according to the times, the anniversary has been held annually. However, it is in the 18th century, in full Baroque, when the festival begins to appear as such, and during the Romantic Decimónico playful when it reaches the structure it has today. The Celebration takes place during the morning of each Dos de Mayo, the eve of the Feast of the Cross, when Caravaca becomes the capital of joy, beauty and festive participation. Wine Horses begin at dawn with the washing and harnessing the horse, in over forty different locations in the city. Few spectators, most linked to the rocks or family have the privilege to attend the ceremony. In the early morning light group (formed by the horse and four horses), is preparing to recognize the streets within hours of the show will be the scenario. Fast runs and solemn presences begin to get followers who have not given up the rock around the passage of celebration.

== Entertainment ==
Thuiller Theatre, built in 1843 on the old "Court of Comedy". In 2006, after being closed several months, completed the last renovation of the building, reopening to the public in April of that year with the play El hombre de Central Park, by Carlos Larrañaga.

Besides this theater, the Culture House and the cultural center built in the Church of the Society of Jesus are the places where cultural activity centers, film and artistic community.

One of the most established cultural events is the Theatre Week Caravaca de la Cruz, who in 2010 reached its thirtieth edition. It is now done at the end of July each year in the Plaza de Toros in the town.

Since December 2010 is being carried out work on the Multifunctional Center and Auditorium of Caravaca de la Cruz, which has been controversial for its potential visual impact on the Old Town area, although from the drivers of argues that this work will be minimal and that the building itself will be a new attraction for the municipality.

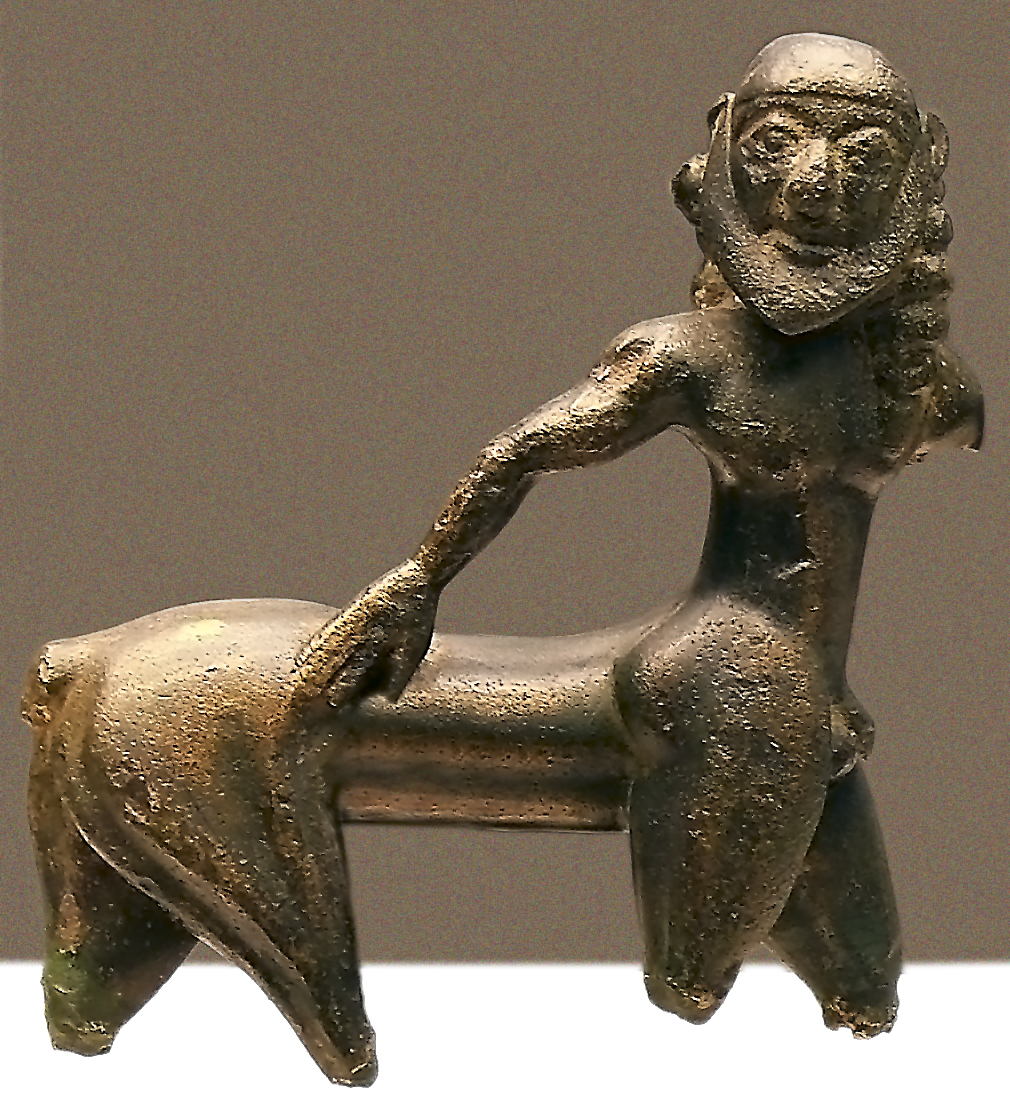
Little figurine in bronze found in 'Campo de Caravaca', 6th century BC

== Natural heritage ==
'Las Fuentes del Marques' is a place of natural beauty whose role lies in the numerous births of crystalline waters that form a unique setting. This space is located the Tower of the Templars, a small castle in the Middle Ages constituted a defense outpost of Caravaca de la Cruz. It has been installed interpretation center of nature showing the species of birds, fish and small mammals that inhabit the place.

== See also ==
- Nasrid raid on Murcia (1392)
- List of municipalities in the Region of Murcia
