= Barranda =

Coordinates: 38°03′N 1°58′W

- village
- Interactive map of Barranda
- Municipality: Caravaca de la Cruz

Population (2009)
  - Total: 884
- Time zone: UTC+1 (CET)
  - Summer (DST): UTC+2 (CEST)

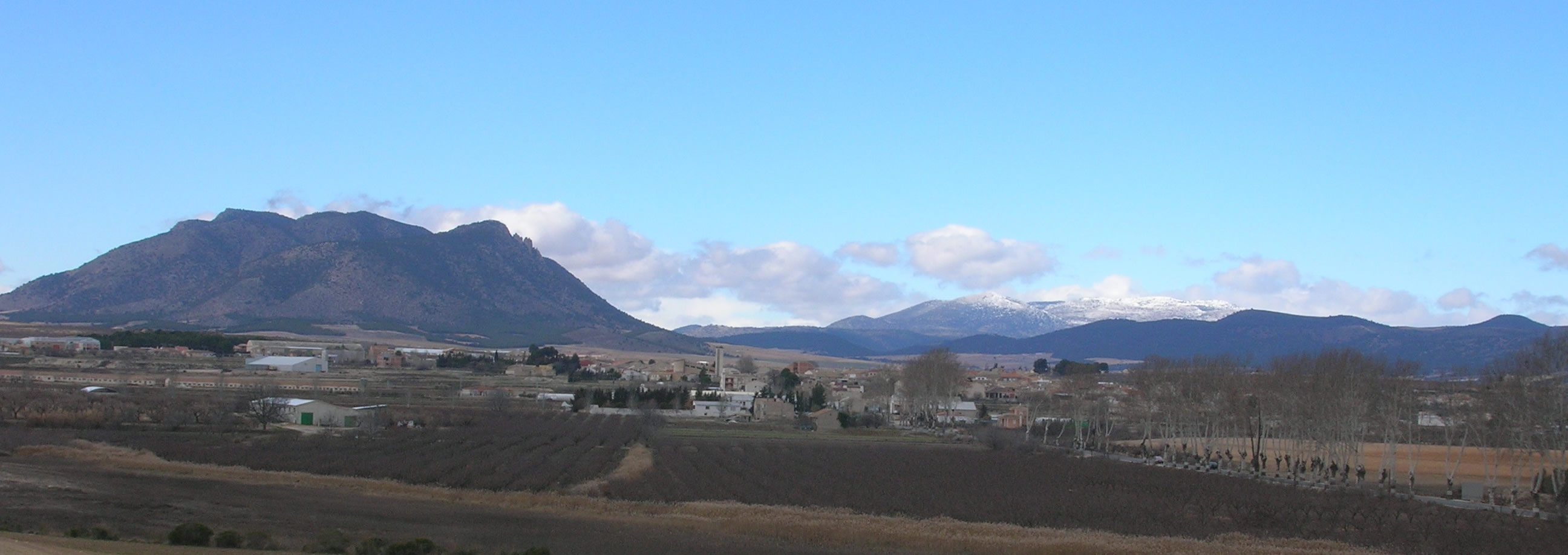
Vista general. A la izquierda, la sierra de Mojantes

Barranda is a village of Murcia, located in the municipality of Caravaca de la Cruz. According to the 2009 census, the village has 884 inhabitants.

Houses in Barranda are distributed throughout the highway. In the central zone of the town, in its main square, popularly well-known like "El Muelle", it is where every year "pregón" is staged, a satirical relation of main events lived by its inhabitants. This event belongs to the program of the celebrations in honor to the Virgen de la Candelaria, that are celebrated from the last Sunday of January to the February 2. Barranda and its people celebrate the famous "Fiesta de las Cuadrillas", a folk festival which takes place every last Sunday of January and attracts more than twenty thousand people to enjoy folk music in the streets. Thanks to this deeply rooted cultural tradition, in 2006 opened the Museum of Ethnic Music, where it explains Carlos Blanco Fadol collection, with over four thousand instruments from around the world.

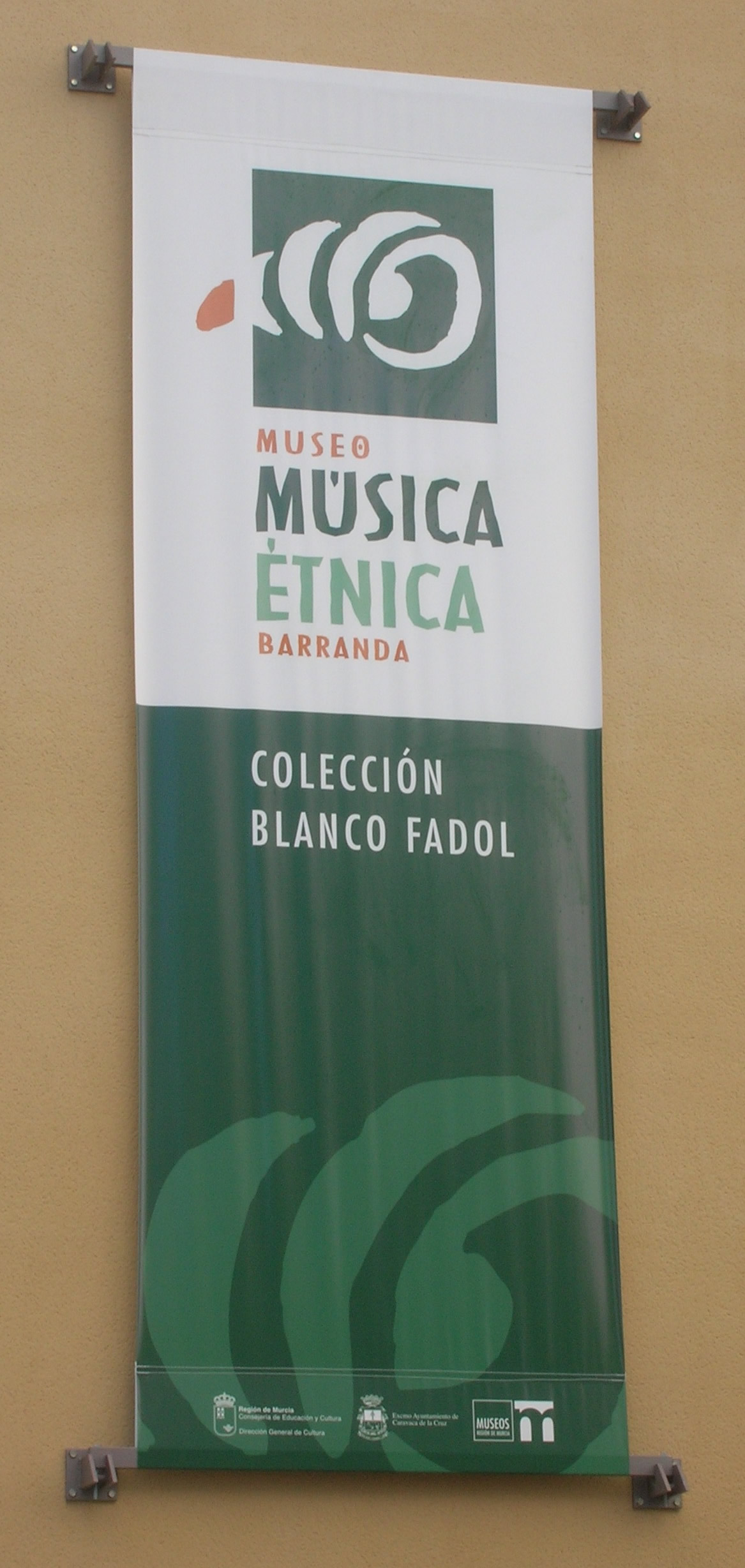
Museo de Música Étnica de Barranda

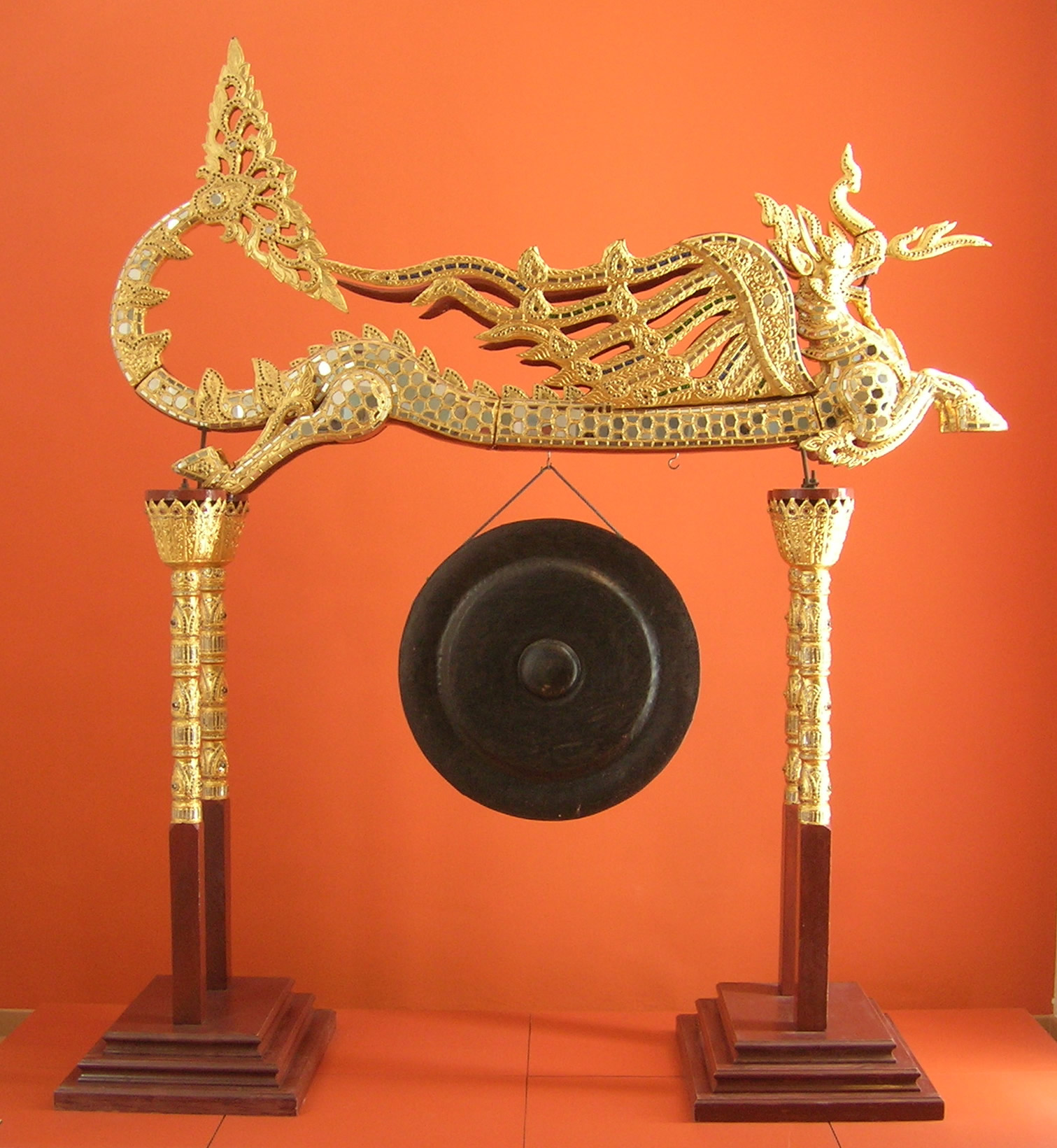
Museo de Música Étnica de Barranda
