= Basilica of Vera Cruz =

Church (Spain)

Coordinates: 38.10770°N 1.85837°W

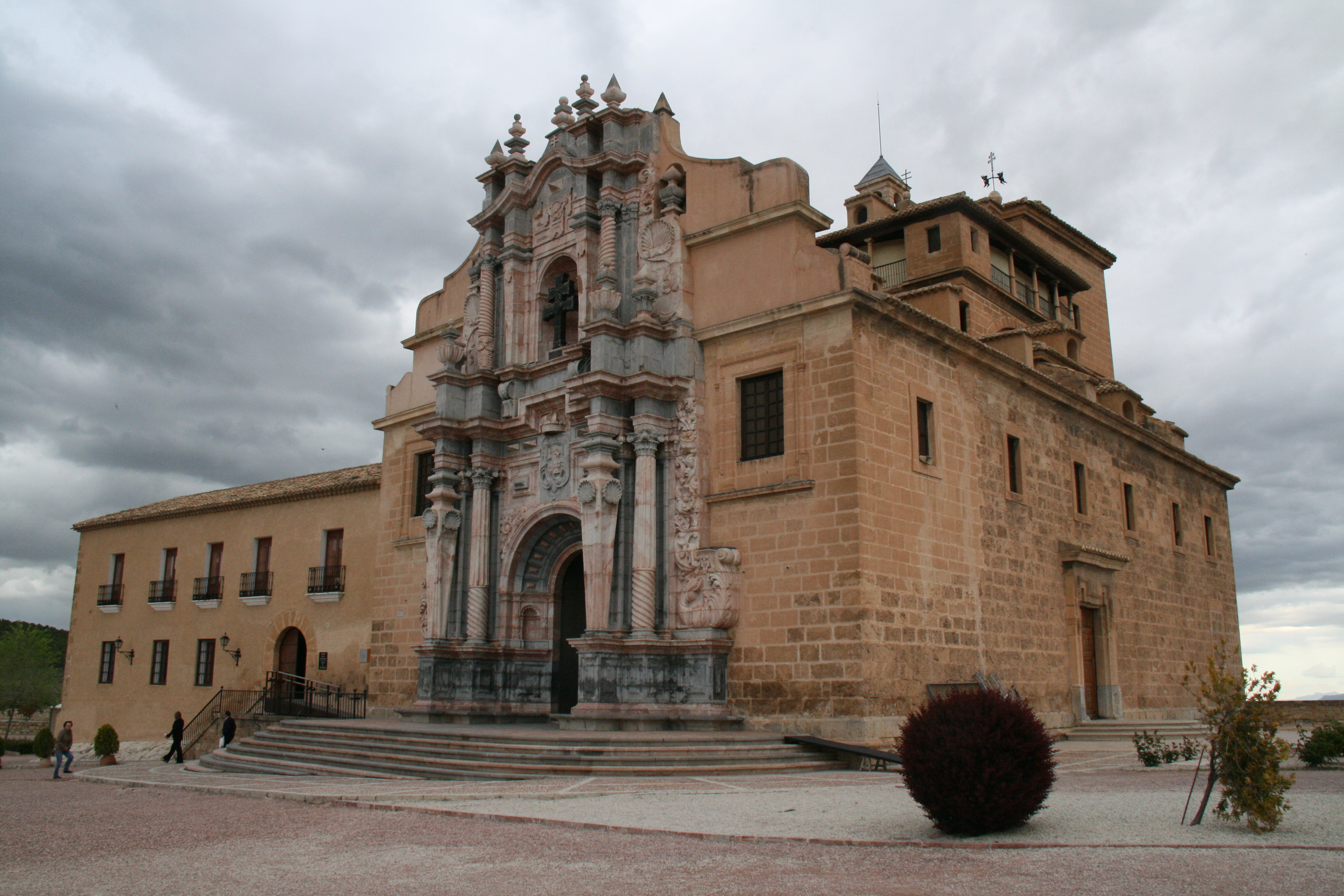
Exterior of basilica

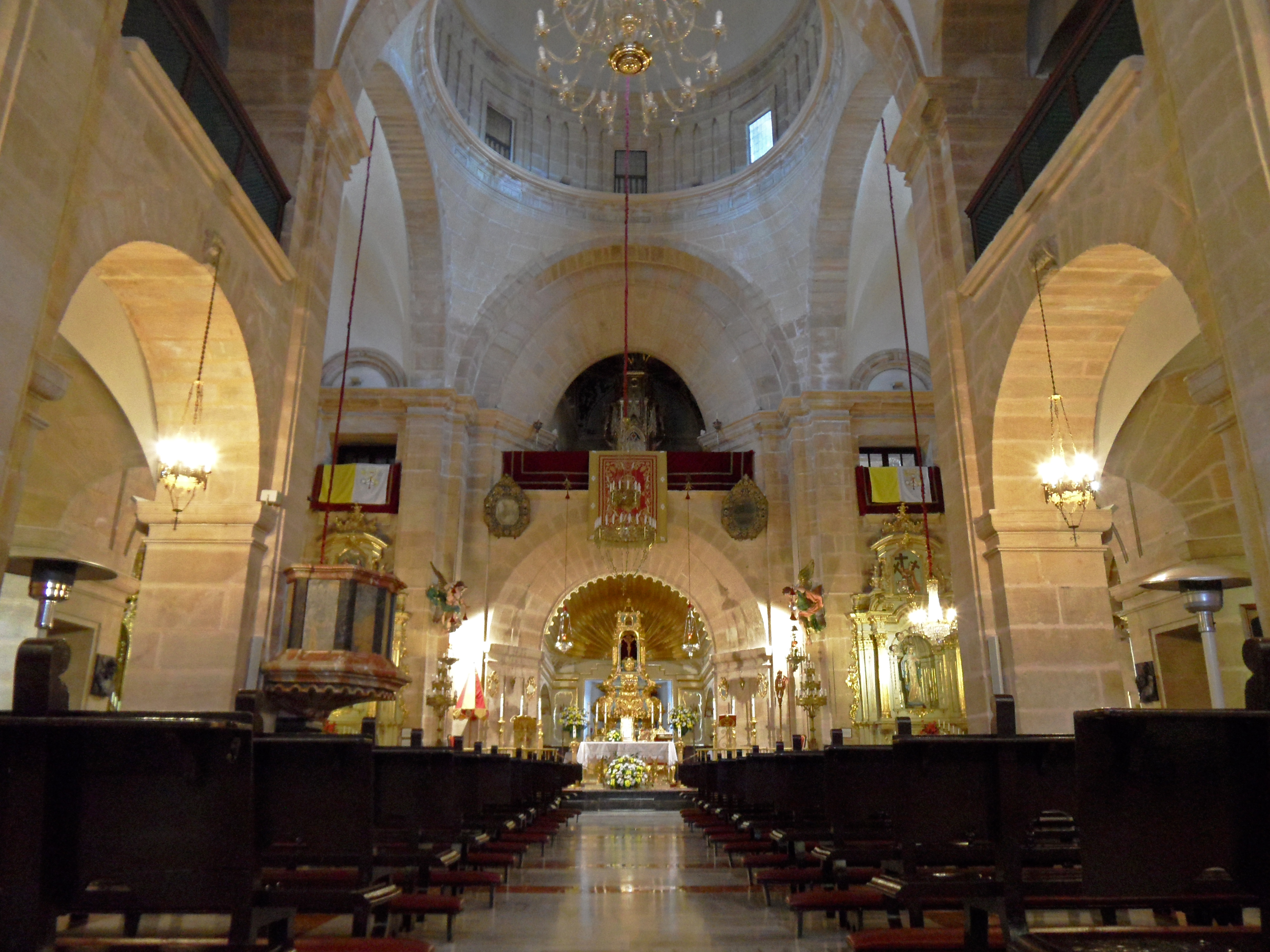
Interior of basilica

Basilica of Vera Cruz (Spanish: Basílica de la Vera Cruz) is a Roman Catholic Church (minor basilica) in town Caravaca de la Cruz.

The church was given the title of minor basilica by Dicastery for Divine Worship and the Discipline of the Sacraments on December 3, 2007.
