= Rafael Pi Belda =

Spanish sculptor

- Born: January 25, 1929; Valencia, Spain
- Died: April 3, 2012 (aged 83); Valencia, Spain
- Known for: Sculpture

Rafael Pi Belda (January 25, 1929 – April 3, 2012) was a Spanish sculptor. He studied beaux-arts in Valencia under the guidance of Enrique Pérez Comendador and José Ortells López. His works are mainly figurative.

== Biography ==
=== Early years ===
Rafael Pi Belda was born in Valencia on 25 January 1929. He grew up in a working family. His father worked as a furniture restorer though his mother also played a key role in his initiation to the Fine Arts. During his childhood years he lived in the historic district of Valencia where numerous artists' studios were devoted to the making of religious images in the vicinity of Valencia Cathedral. The observation of their activity awakened his penchant for sculpture.

=== Education ===
From the age of sixteen, he attended the workshops of sculptor Carmelo Vicent, where he learnt the techniques of model-making, carving and relief as a preparation for the entrance examination to Real Academia de Bellas Artes de San Carlos de Valencia. Between 1947 (aged 18) and 1952 he specialised in sculpture at that school under the tuition of Octavio Vicent, Carmelo Vicent, Enrique Giner and Manuel Beltrán among others.

In 1952 he received a study grant from the regional government of Valencia that allowed him to pursue his education in Madrid and in Italy.

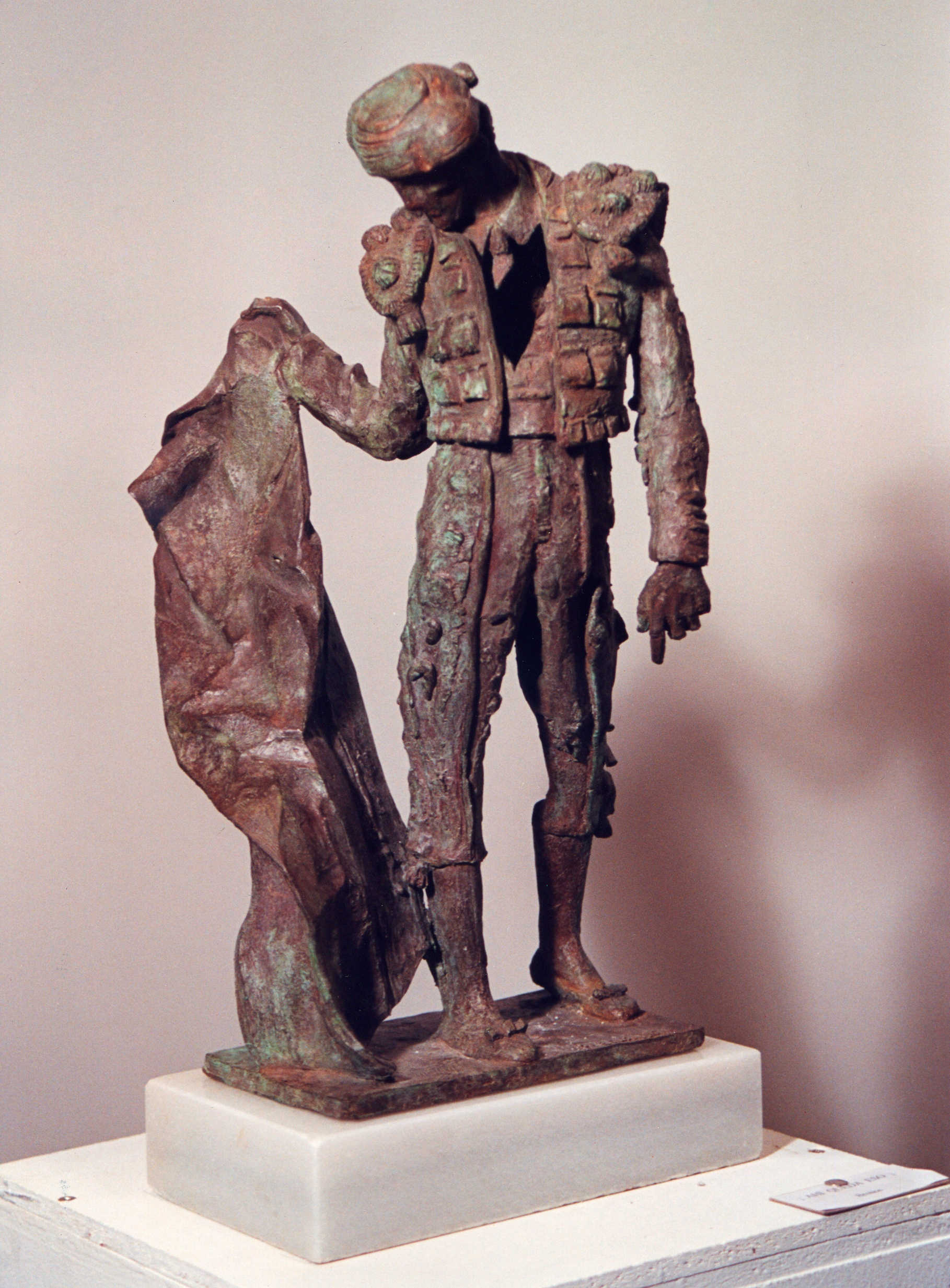
Ahí queda eso, Rafael Pi Belda (private collection).

=== Career ===
In 1983 he started creating large-size bronze monuments. His work Al moro y al cristiano, installed in Caravaca de la Cruz (Murcia, Spain) is the first of this series.

Until 1994 he shared his time between his work as a secondary school teacher and his sculpture workshop.

Since 1997 he is dedicated full-time to sculpture.

== Comments on his work ==
Francisco Agramunt commented on his style and technique: «Rafael Pi Belda's sculpture has its grounds on continued work, radical honesty and great technical mastery. Among the sculptors of the second half of the 20th century, his case is that of an independent artist that has developed a distinctive technique, within which he has evolved smoothly but steadily, until reaching a style that could be defined as mediterranean impressionism of a great expressive maturity, not only because his art is imbued with a classicist character but also because the artist is emotionally deeply rooted in that coastal geography. Rafael operates within a kind of mediterranean impressionism in order to elaborate sculptures that stand out because of the intelligent game of coupling, their open and harmonious volumes and their stunning technical perfection. His technical mastery has allowed him to deal with compositions, portrays, public monuments and religious images in an equally successful manner. Through the observation of his works that appeal the observer by their beauty and are both intellectual and popular, we can feel his love for proportions, for play on volumes, for harmony in composition and the taste for a job well done».

Cristina Gutiérrez-Cortines wrote «Rafael balances traditional artistic culture and openness to modern sculpture within the current mediterranean expressionism. The subjects of their works are ordinary people, imbued with nostalgy: old men, beggars, etc. approaching them from a personal attitude. The use of wax allows him to model the body and clothes as though they were soft adaptable sheets that the artist drills, folds or projects in the air. This is one of the main devices he uses to amplify and deepen the emotion enclosed by the bronze. He distorts the anatomy, he makes limbs slimmer, he breaks the flesh open and plays with fabrics laying them out pompously. His works, even the small scale ones, present a kind of monumental character, conferred by his particular way of assembling shape simplification and compact volumes with concrete elements, references and gestures containing the expressive energy».

== Work ==
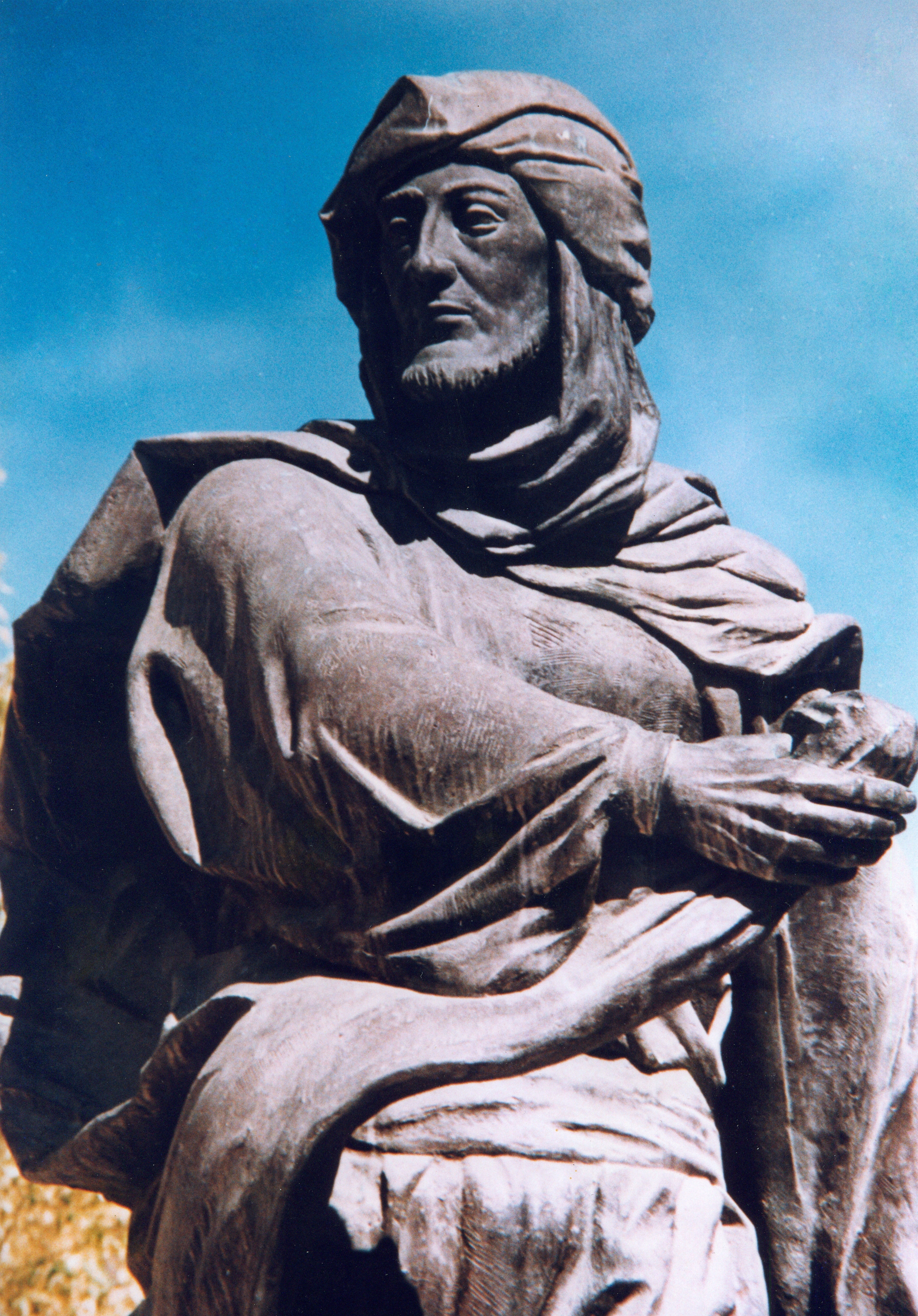
Al moro y al cristiano (detail of the Moor), Rafael Pi Belda (Caravaca de la Cruz, Murcia, Spain).

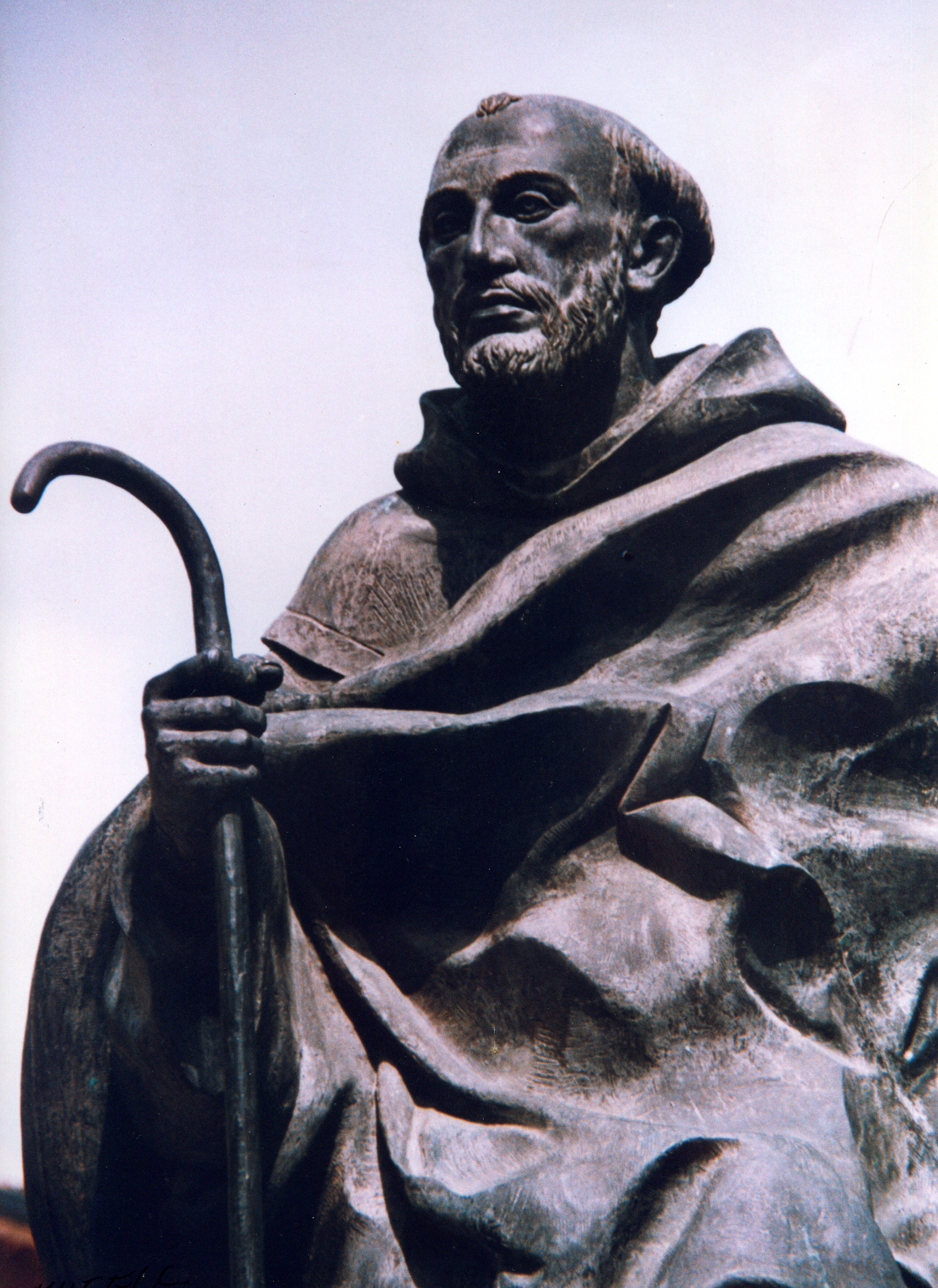
A San Juan de la Cruz (detail), Rafael Pi Belda (Caravaca de la Cruz, Murcia, Spain).

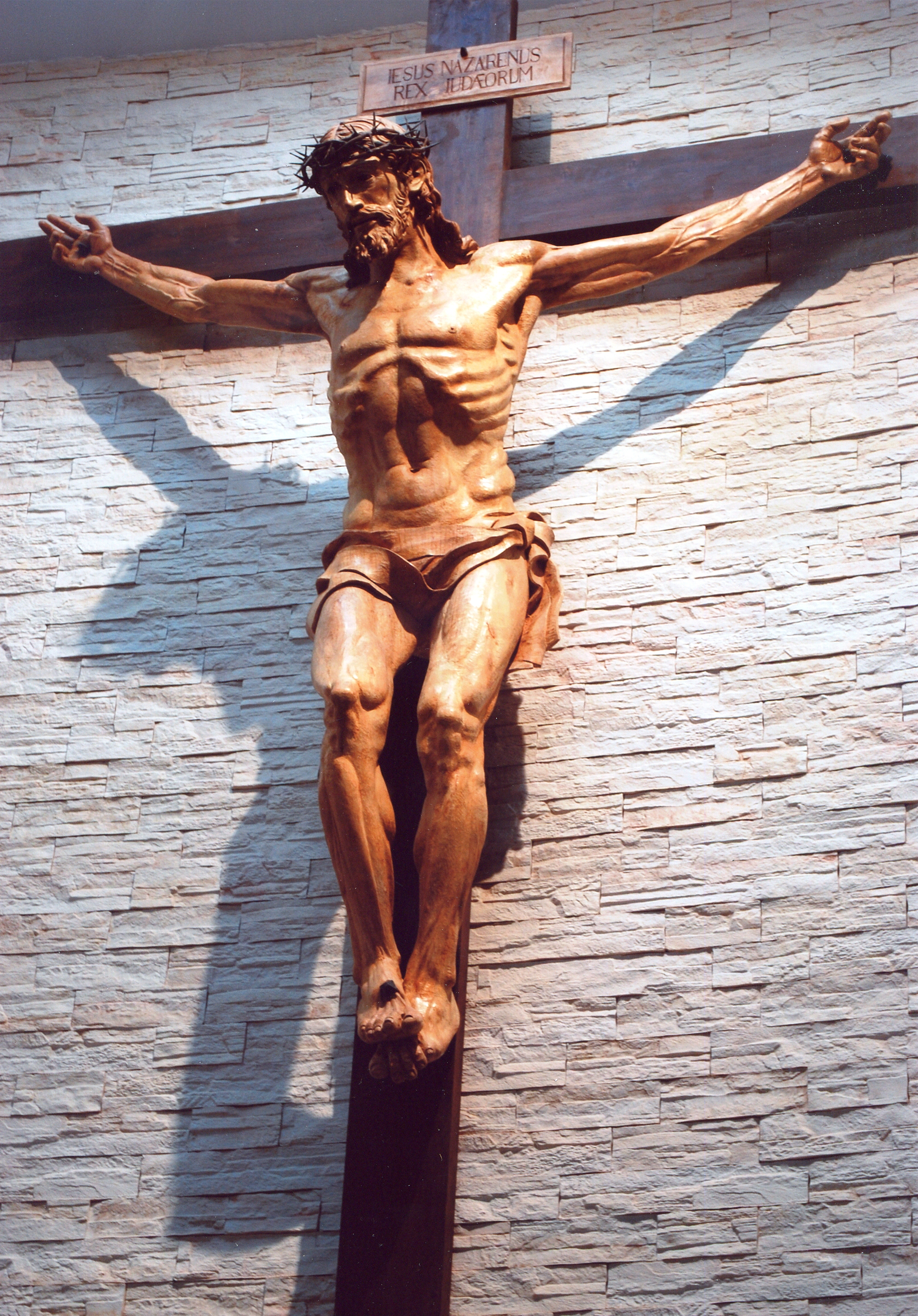
Cristo crucificado, Rafael Pi Belda (Parroquia de San Luis Obispo, Valencia, Spain).

- Al moro y al cristiano, 1983, Caravaca de la Cruz (Murcia, Spain). Bronze. 2’20 metres high.
- A San Juan de la Cruz, 1986, Caravaca de la Cruz (Murcia). Bronze. 2’00 metres high.
- Al alpargatero, 1987, Cehegín (Murcia, Spain). Bronze. 2’20 metres high.
- Talía, 1990, Teatro Guerra, Lorca (Murcia). Bronze. 0’85 metres high.
- Conde de Floridablanca, 1992, Murcia. Bronze. 1’65 metres high. I.E.S. Floridablanca.
- A los tamboristas, 1997, Moratalla (Murcia, Spain). Bronze. 2’20 metres high.
- Al agricultor, 1998, Cehegín (Murcia, Spain). Bronze. 2’20 metres high.
- IX Conde de Aranda, 1998, L'Alcora (Castellón, Spain). Bronze. 2’30 metres high.
- San Francisco de Asís, 1998, L'Alcora (Castellón). Bronze. 0’60 metres high.
- Granerer de Torrent, 1999, Torrent (Valencia). Bronze. 2’20 metres high.
- A la nazarena, 1999, Cehegín (Murcia). Bronze. 2’30 metres high.
- Via Crucis, 2000, Caravaca de la Cruz (Murcia, Spain). Bronze. 0 ’45 metres wide by 0’60 metres high (each one of the fourteen stations of the Cross). Real Basílica Santuario de la Vera Cruz de Caravaca.
- A los tamboristas, 2000, Mula (Murcia, Spain). Bronze. 2’30 metres high. Represents two drummers in competition during Mula's Easter festivities.
- Cristo de la vega, 2000, Calasparra (Murcia, Spain). Bronze. 2’30 metres high. Located in Finca El Soto (on the road linking Calasparra and Caravaca de la Cruz, Murcia, Spain). Christ crucified.
- A las madres fundadoras de las HH. de Cristo Crucificado, 2001, Murcia (Santo Ángel). Bronze. 1’80 m.
- Rey Don Jaime, 2001, Nules (Castellón). Bronze. 2’40 m. This monument portrays the king James I of Aragon (Rey Don Jaime I el Conquistador), king of Valencia and Aragon (Crown of Aragon).
- Al vino, 2001, Bullas (Murcia). Bronze. 2’20 metres high.
- Obra conmemorativa de la concesión de la Santa Sede de Año Jubilar perpetuo a la Basílica Santuario de la Vera Cruz de Caravaca, 2001, Caravaca de la Cruz (Murcia, Spain). Bronze.
- Ecce Homo, 2002, Torrent (Valencia, Spain). Polychrome wood. 1’65 m. Paso de Semana Santa (passion float) in Torrent.
- A la gent del camp, 2003, Torrent (Valencia, Spain). Bronze. 2’20 metres high.
- Al tejero, 2003, Cehegín (Murcia, Spain). Bronze. 1’90 metres high. Tribute to the Spanish tile craftmanship.
- Al venerable Fray Luis Amigó, 2004, Torrent (Valencia, Spain). Bronze. 2’30 metres high.
- Pantocrátor, 2004, Gandía (Valencia, Spain). Mahogany high relief, 5’00 metres wide by 3’00 metres high, installed at the high altar of the Parish of Cristo Rey.
- A la Beata Juana Maria Condesa Lluch, 2005, Valencia (Spain). Bronze. 1’50 metres high. Installed in Casa Generalicia de las HH. Esclavas de María Inmaculada.
- A los Caballos del Vino, 2007, Caravaca de la Cruz (Murcia, Spain). Bronze. 2’00 x 3’64 x 3’50 metres. The monument depicts a horse held by four men while running uphill during "La Carrera" ("The ride"). "La Carrera" is an event that takes place every year in Caravaca de la Cruz as part of a traditional festivity called "Los Caballos del Vino".
- San Antonio de Padua, 2007, Gandía (Valencia, Spain). Patinated lime wood, 1'50 metres high. Parish of Cristo Rey.
- Beata Juana María Condesa Lluch con niña orante, 2008, Valencia. Chapel of Colegio de las Esclavas de María Inmaculada. Birch carved wood, 1’50 metres high.
- Cristo Crucificado, 2009, Valencia. Birch carved wood. 2’30 metres high, on a cypress wood cross 4’50 metres high installed at the high altar of the Parish of San Luis Obispo de Valencia.
- San Luis Obispo, 2009, Valencia. Birch carved wood. Parish of San Luis Obispo de Valencia.
- Beata Juana María Condesa Lluch, 2010, Almansa (Albacete, Spain). Bronze. 1’60 metres high. Installed in Centro de Espiritualidad de las HH. Esclavas de María Inmaculada.
- Als espardenyers, 2010, La Vila Vella (Castellón, Spain). Bronze. 1’80 metres high.

== Gallery ==
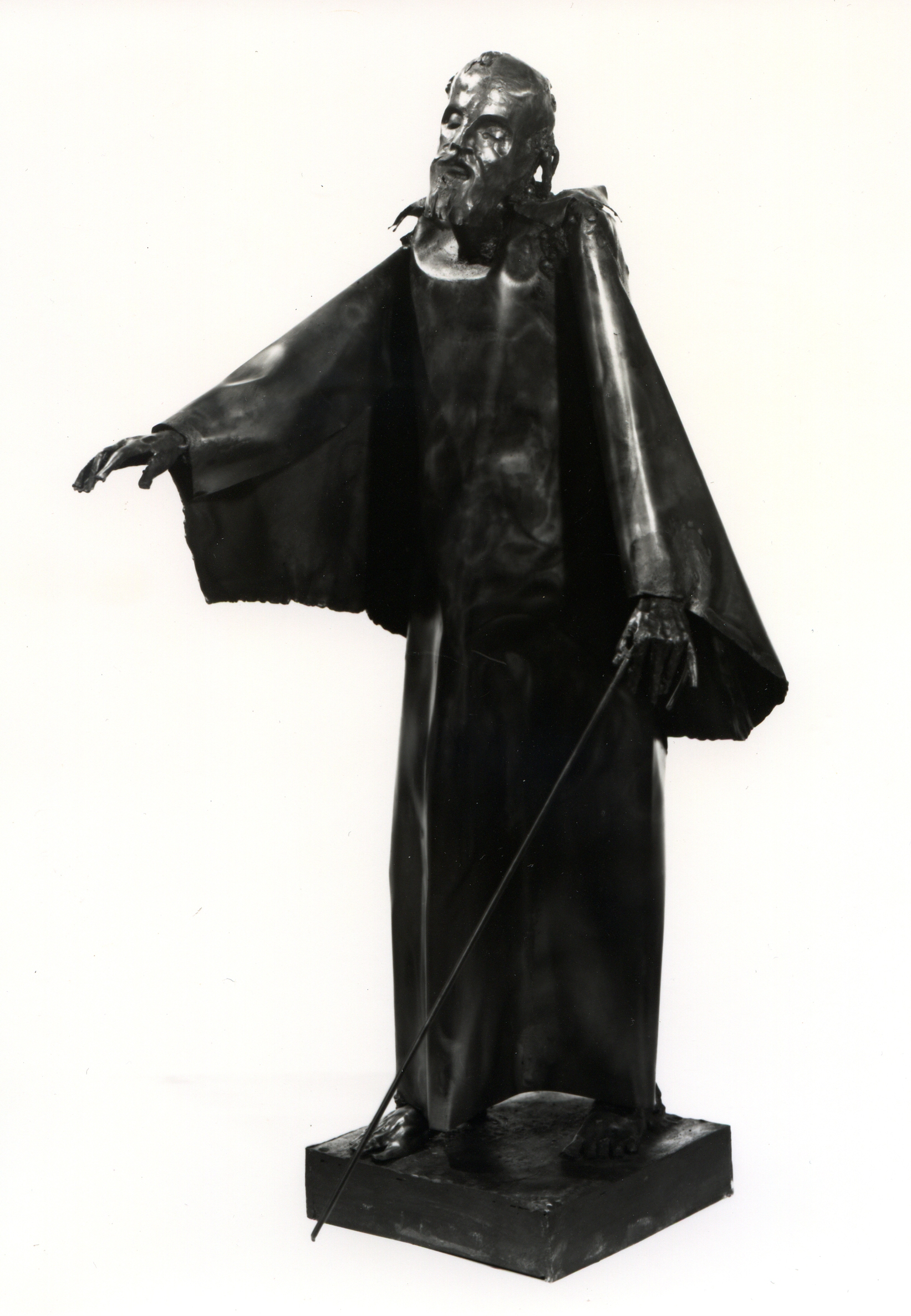
Ciego (Blind man). Artist's private collection.

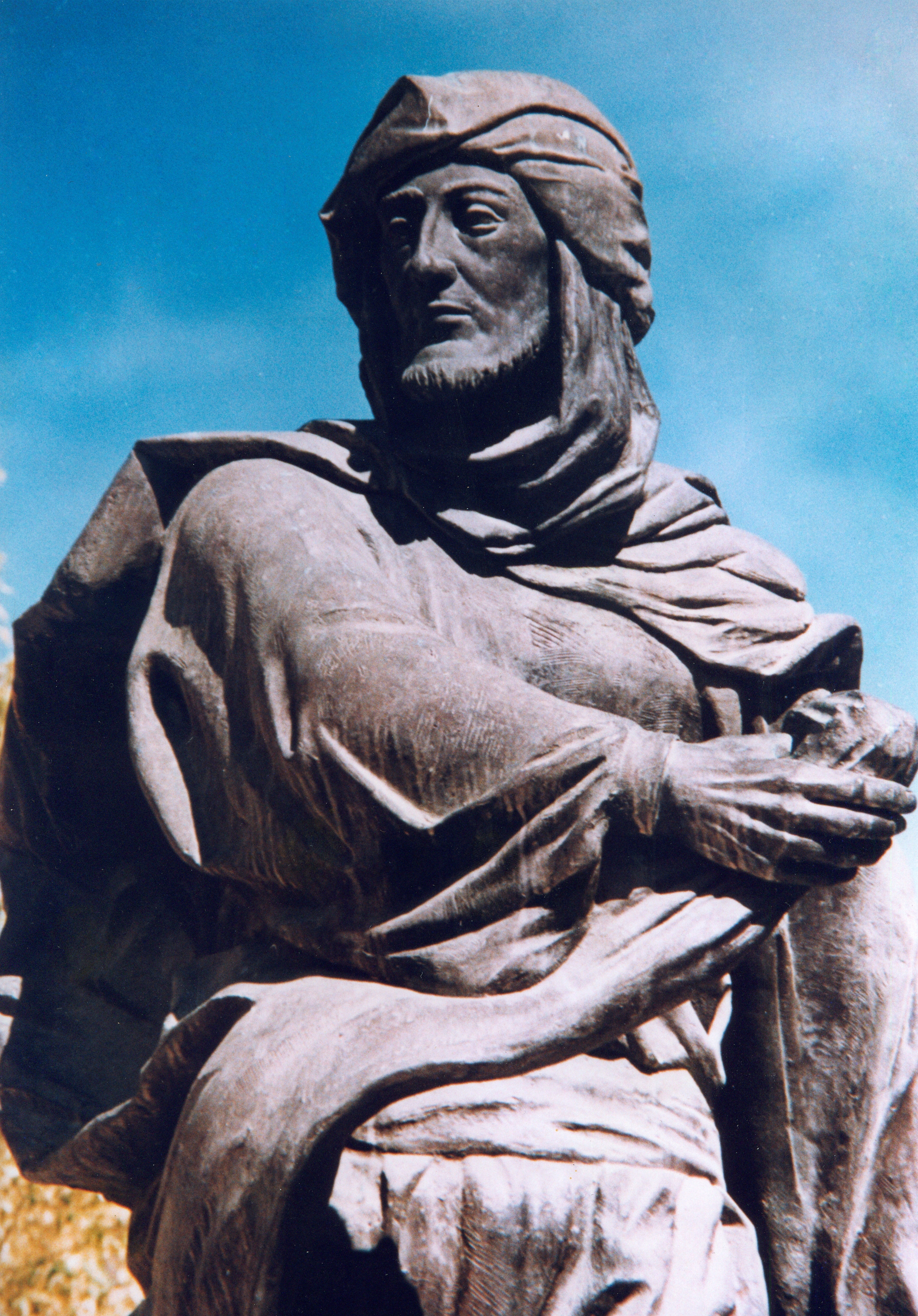
Al moro y al cristiano (Monument to the Moor and the Christian; detail of the Moor), 1983. Caravaca de la Cruz (Murcia, Spain).

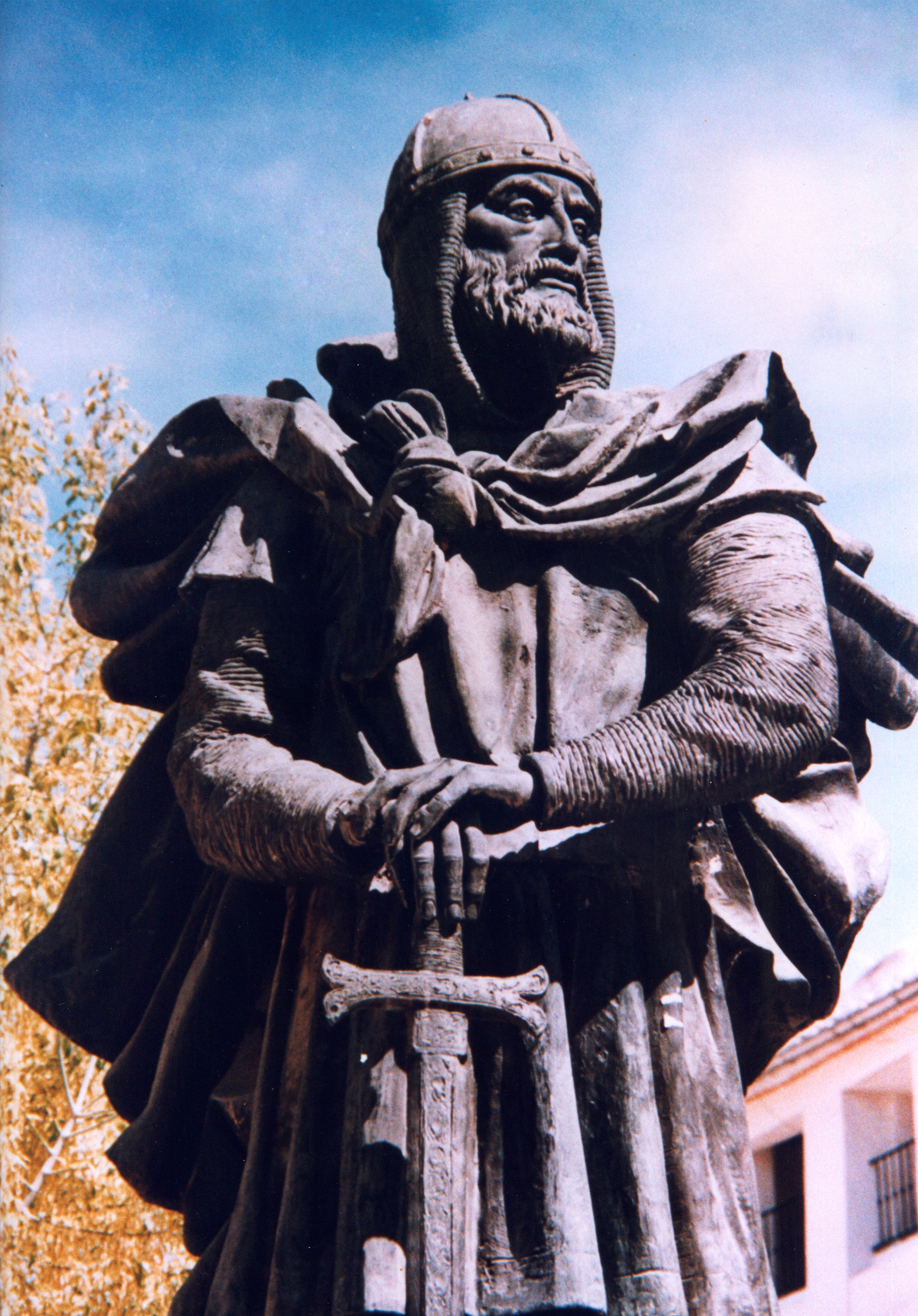
Al moro y al cristiano (Monument to the Moor and the Christian; detail of the Christian), 1983. Caravaca de la Cruz (Murcia, Spain).

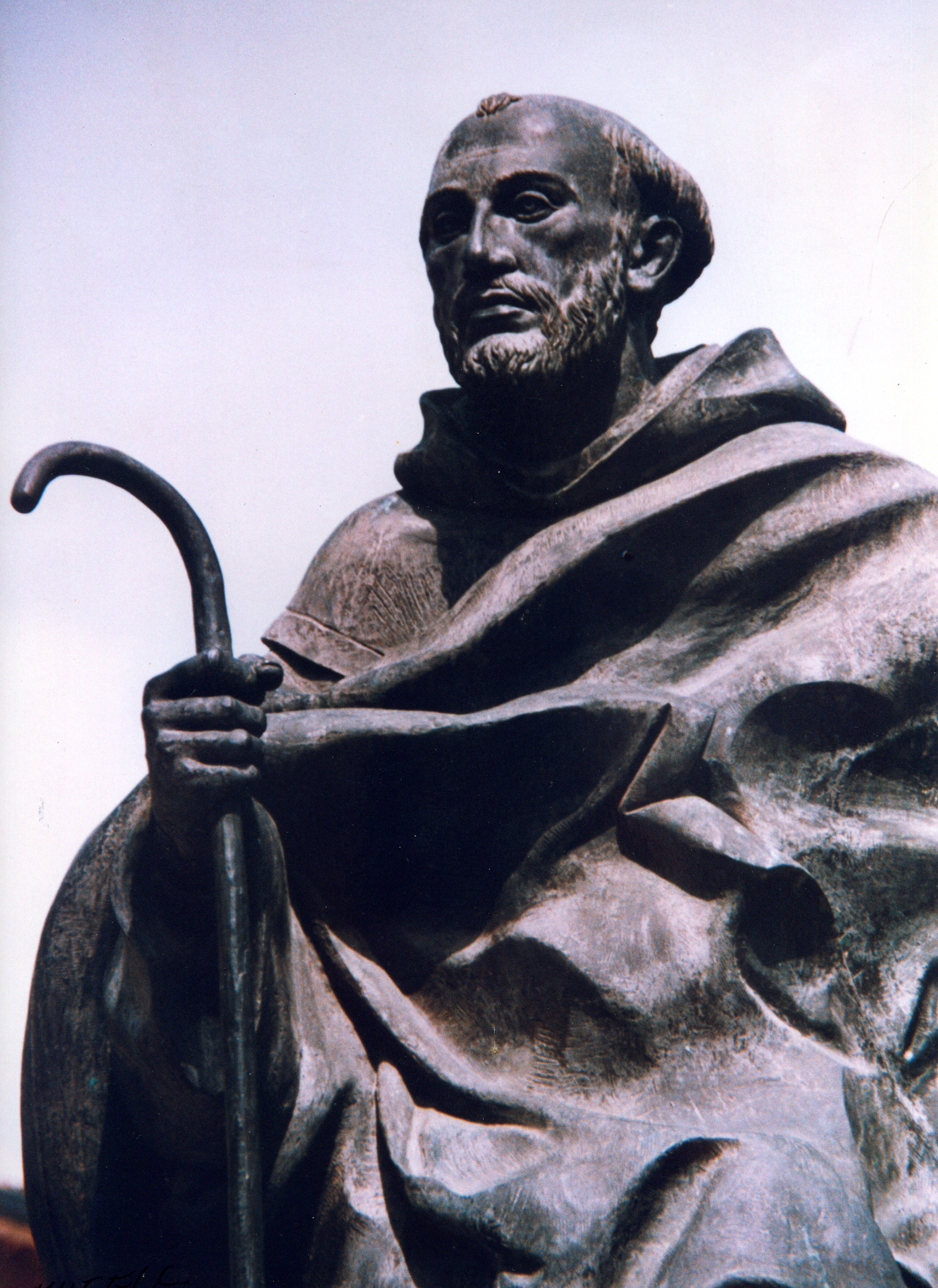
A San Juan de la Cruz (San John of the Cross; detail), 1986. Caravaca de la Cruz (Murcia, Spain).

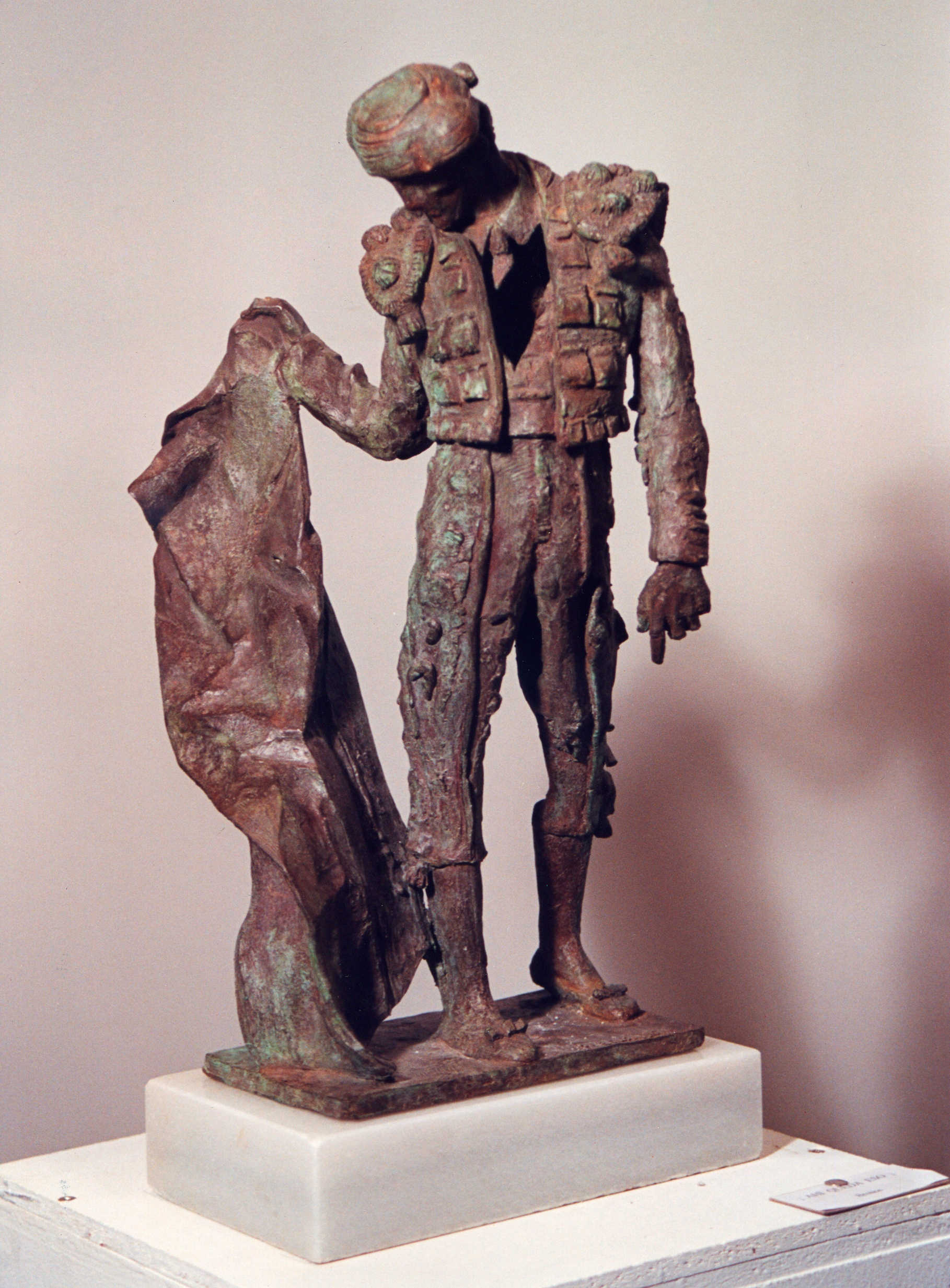
Ahí queda eso. Private collection.

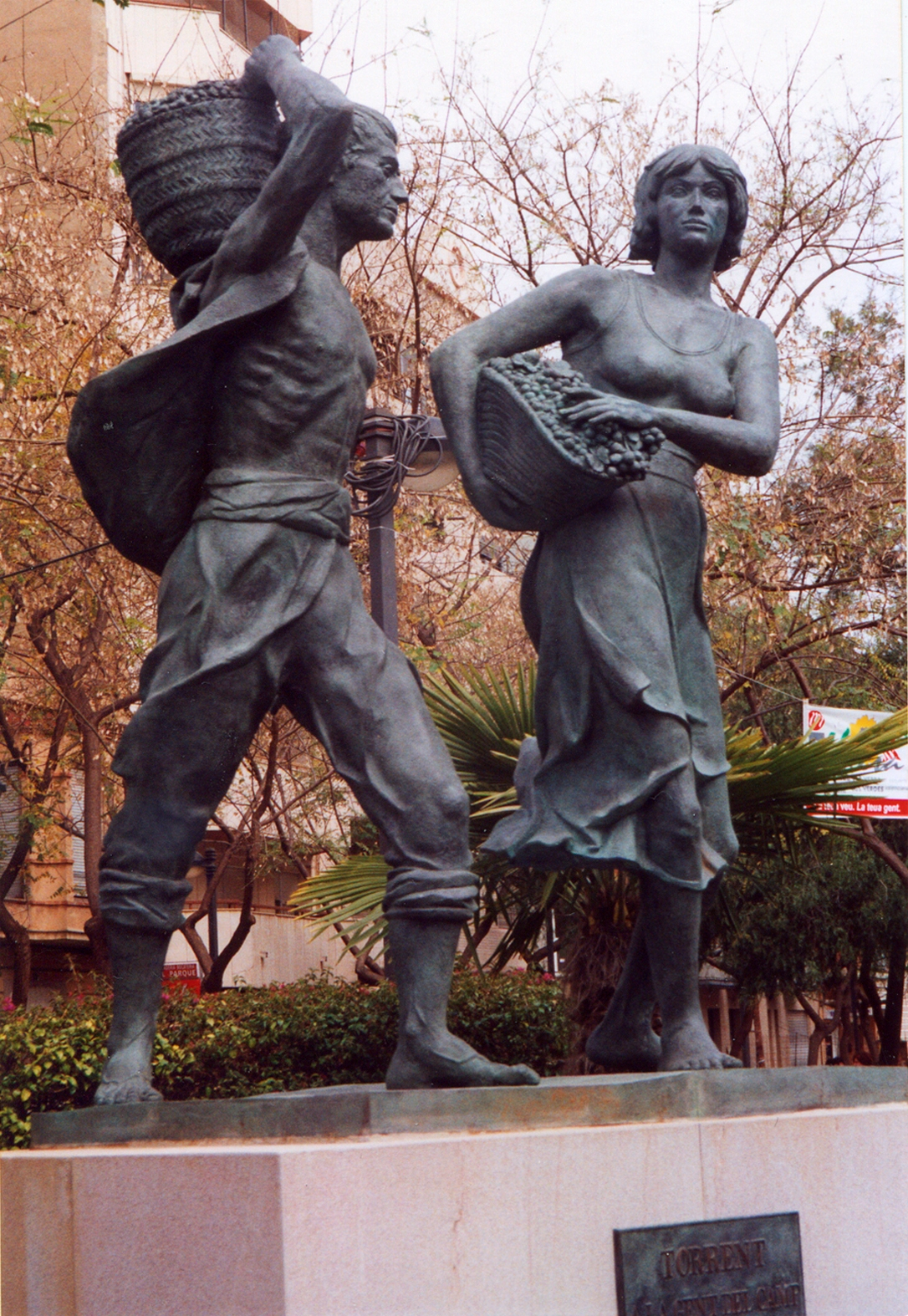
A la gent del camp, 2003. Torrent (Valencia, Spain).

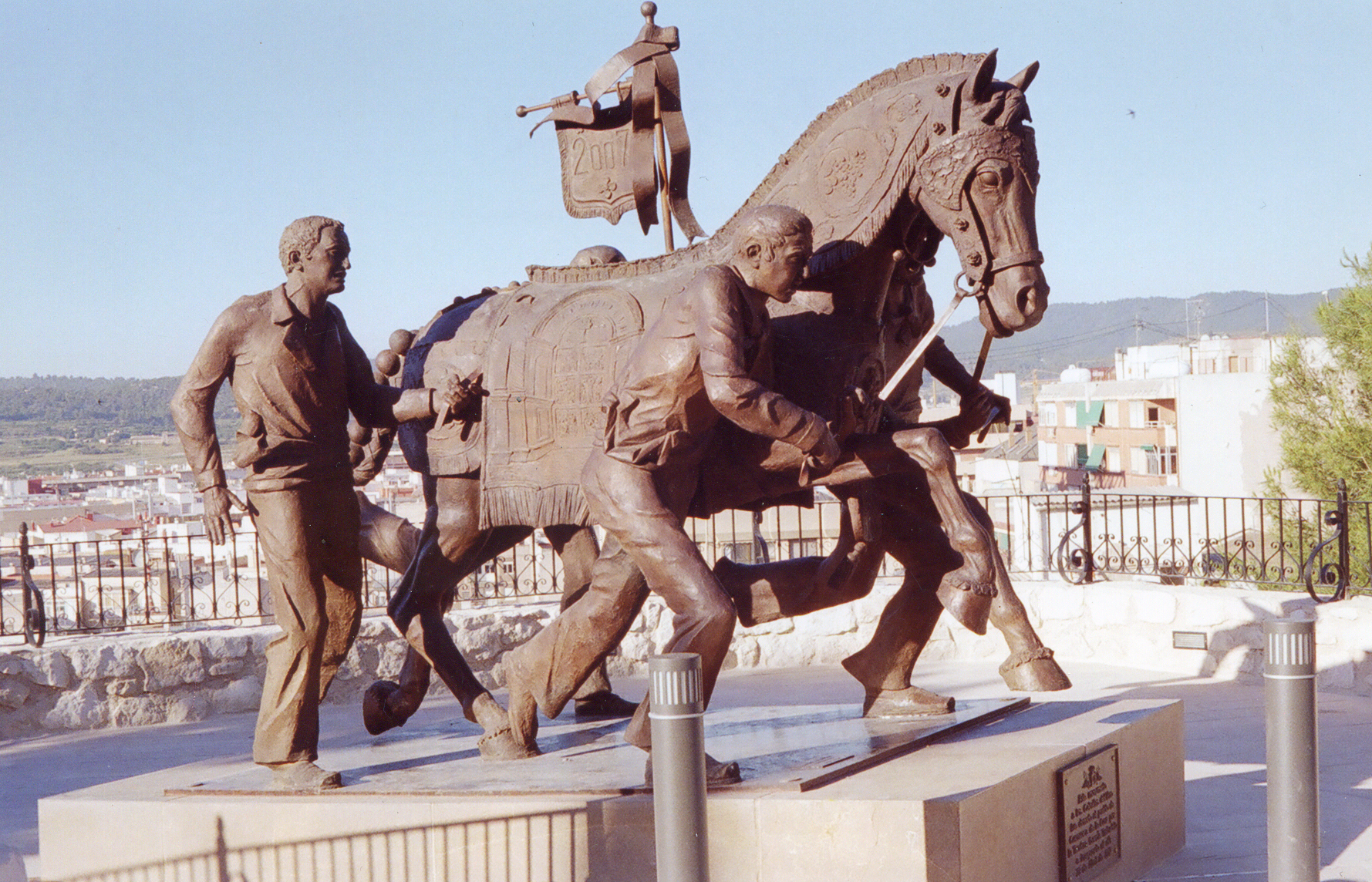
A los Caballos del Vino, 2007. Caravaca de la Cruz (Murcia, Spain).

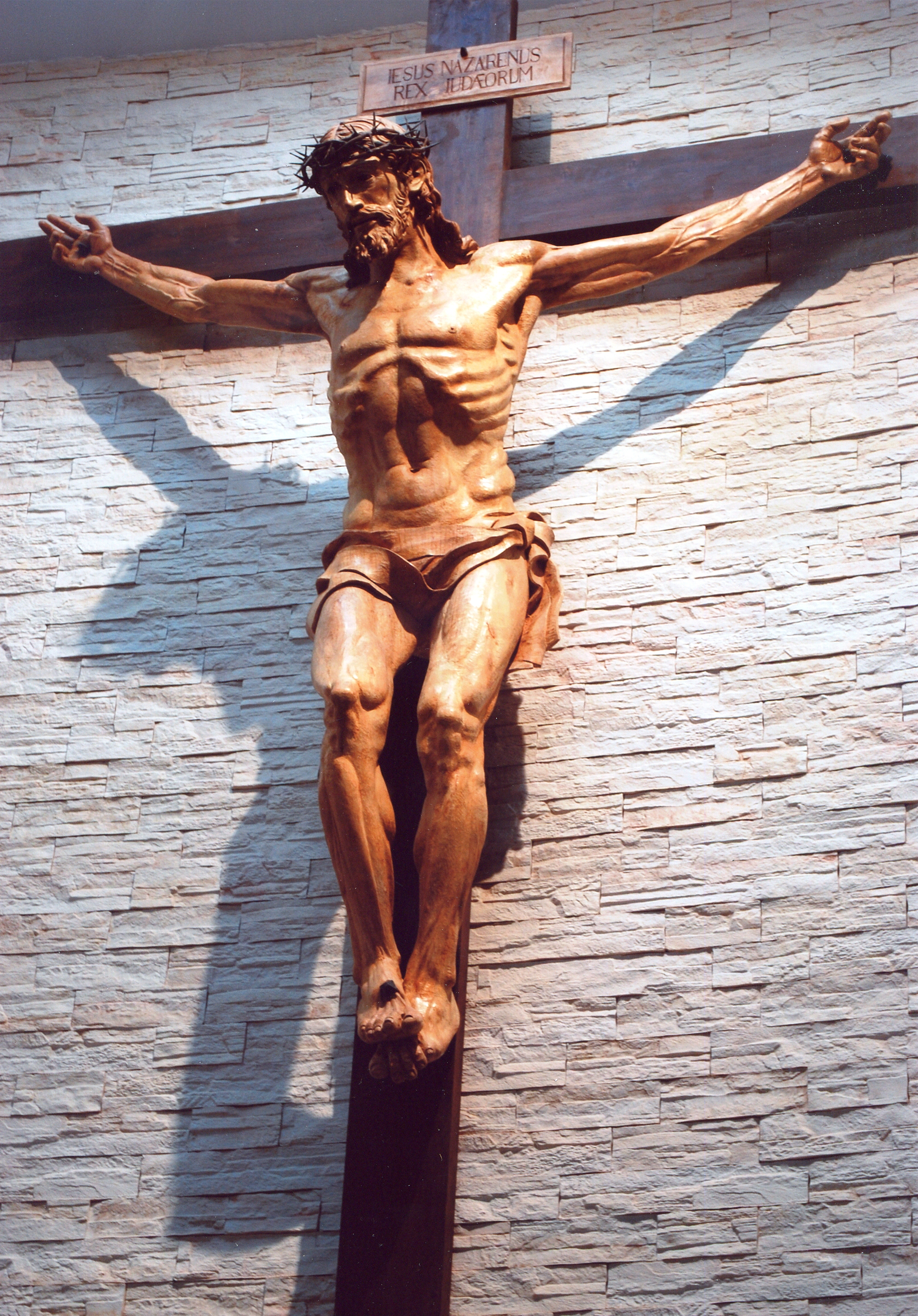
Cristo crucificado (Christ Crucified, 2009, Parish of San Luis Obispo (Valencia, Spain).

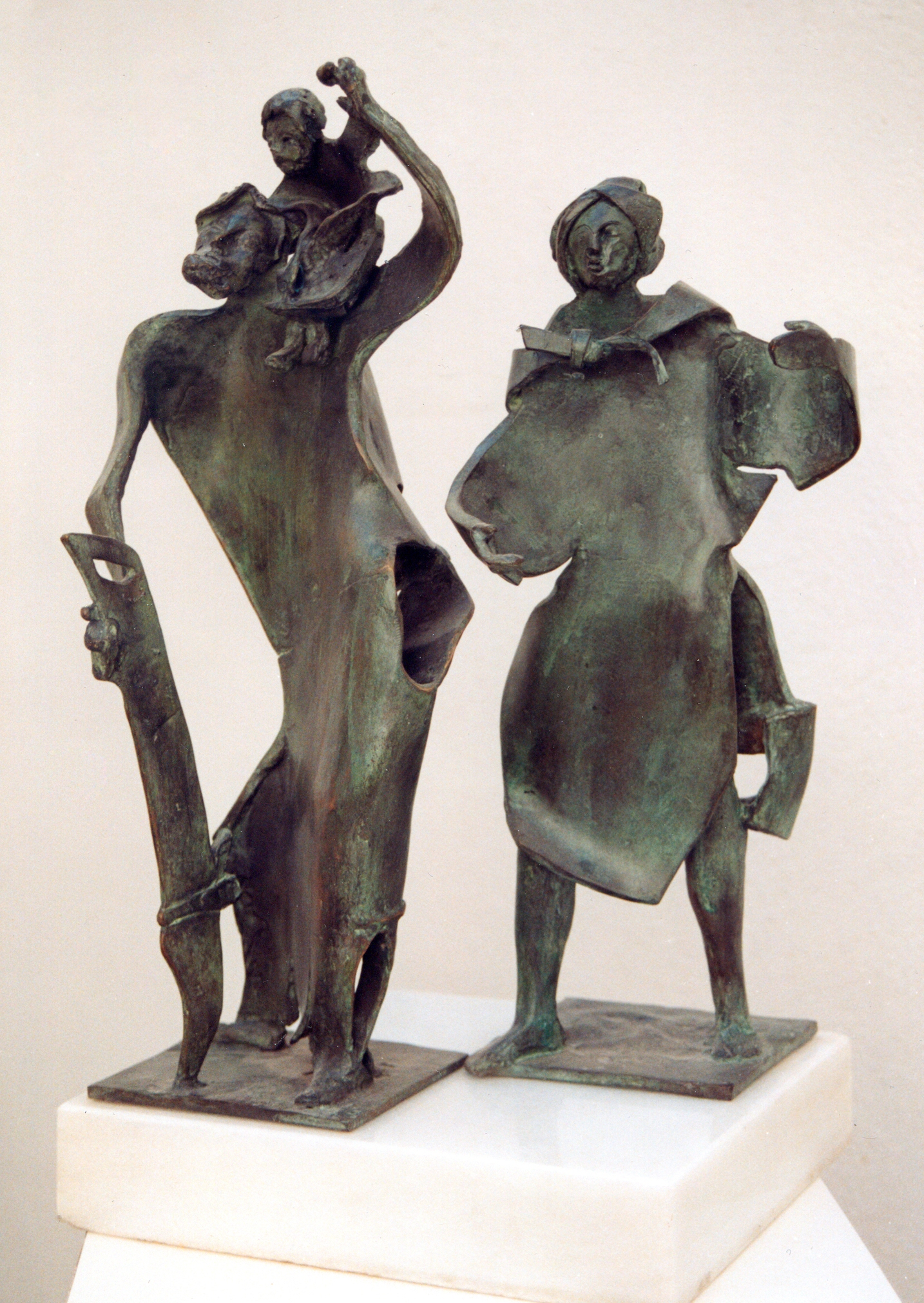
A la familia. Artist's private collection.
