= Eduardo Francisco Pironio =

Argentine Roman Catholic cardinal (1920–1998)

Blessed Eduardo Francisco Pironio
- Cardinal-Bishop of Sabina-Porto Mirteto
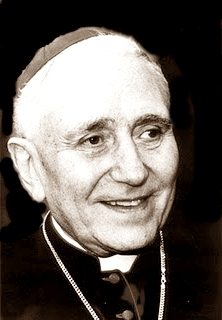
- Church: Catholic Church
- See: Sabina-Poggio Mirteto
- Appointed: 11 July 1995
- Term ended: 5 February 1998
- Predecessor: Agnelo Rossi
- Successor: Lucas Moreira Neves
- Previous posts: Vicar General of Mercedes (1959–1960); Auxiliary Bishop of La Plata (1964–1972); Titular Bishop of Caeciri (1964–1972); Apostolic Administrator of Avellaneda (1967); Secretary General of the Latin American Episcopal Council (1968–1972); President of the Latin American Episcopal Council (1972–1975); Bishop of Mar del Plata (1972–1975); Pro-Prefect of the Congregation for Institutes of Consecrated Life and Societies of Apostolic Life (1975–1976); Titular Archbishop of Thiges (1975–1976); Prefect for the Congregation for Institutes of Consecrated Life and Societies of Apostolic Life (1975–1984); Cardinal-Deacon of Santi Cosma e Damiano (1976–1987); President of the Pontifical Council for the Laity (1984–1996); President of the Pontifical Council for Health Care Workers (1985–1989); Cardinal-Priest pro hac vice of Santi Cosma e Damiano (1987–1995)

Orders
- Ordination: 5 December 1943 by Anunciado Serafini
- Consecration: 31 May 1964 by Antonio José Plaza
- Created cardinal: 24 May 1976 by Pope Paul VI
- Rank: Cardinal-Deacon (1976–1987); Cardinal-Priest (1987–1995); Cardinal-Bishop (1995–1998)

Personal details
- Born: Eduardo Francisco Pironio; 3 December 1920 Nueve de Julio, Buenos Aires, Argentina
- Died: 5 February 1998 (aged 77) Rome, Lazio, Italy
- Buried: Basilica of Our Lady of Luján
- Parents: José Pironio; Enriqueta Rosa Butazzoni
- Education: Pontifical Angelicum Athenaeum
- Motto: Christus in vobis spes gloriae ("Christ, in You, the hope of glory")
- Coat of arms: Eduardo Francisco Pironio's coat of arms

Sainthood
- Feast day: 4 February
- Venerated in: Roman Catholic Church
- Beatified: 16 December 2023; Basilica of Our Lady of Luján, Luján, Buenos Aires, Argentina by Cardinal Fernando Vérgez Alzaga
- Attributes: Cardinal's attire
- Shrines: Basilica of Our Lady of Luján, Luján, Argentina

Styles of Eduardo Pironio
- Reference style: His Eminence
- Spoken style: Your Eminence
- Posthumous style: Servant of God
- Informal style: Cardinal
- See: Sabina-Poggio Mirteto

Ordination history of Eduardo Francisco Pironio
History
Priestly ordination
- Ordained by: Anunciado Serafini (Mercedes)
- Date: 5 December 1943
- Place: Basilica of Our Lady of Luján, Luján
Episcopal consecration
- Principal consecrator: Antonio José Plaza
- Co-consecrators: Antonio Quarracino (Nueve de Julio); Luis Juan Tomé (Mercedes)
- Date: 31 May 1964
Cardinalate
- Elevated by: Pope Paul VI
- Date: 24 May 1976
Episcopal succession
Bishops consecrated by Eduardo Francisco Pironio as principal consecrator
- Manuel Guirao: 8 December 1970
- Rómulo García: 24 September 1975
- Sebastiano Sanguinetti: 17 May 1997

Eduardo Francisco Pironio (3 December 1920 – 5 February 1998) was an Argentine Catholic prelate who served in numerous departments of the Roman Curia from 1975 to 1996. He was named a cardinal in 1976 and Cardinal-Bishop of Sabina-Poggio in 1995.

Pironio died in 1998 and on 30 June 2006, the Diocese of Rome began requesting testimonies about his life and sanctity, opening his cause of canonization and bestowing upon him the posthumous title Servant of God. Pope Francis named him as Venerable on 18 February 2022. Pironio was beatified on 16 December 2023.

== Life ==
=== Early life and education ===
Eduardo Pironio was born on 3 December 1920 in Argentina as the last of 22 children of José Pironio and Enriqueta Rosa Butazzoni, who had emigrated from Friuli, Italy.

Months before his death, in an interview, he stated that: "I am the twenty-second child, the last born, and I have to recognize that the story is somewhat miraculous. ...When their first son was born, my mother was only 18 years old, and she became gravely ill. She was in bed for six months, unable to move. When she recovered, the doctors told her that she would not be able to have more children, and that if she did, her life would be in grave danger. She later gave birth to 21 more children – I am the last – and she lived to the age of 82."

Pironio attended elementary school prior to moving into the seminary in La Plata where he studied both philosophy and theology. He continued his studies at the Pontifical Angelicum Athenaeum in Rome where he attained a licentiate in theology.

=== Church career ===
He was ordained on 5 December 1943 in Argentina by Anunciado Serafini. He served as a staff member of the Pío XII Seminary in Mercedes from 1944 until 1959. Pironio served as the vicar general of the Diocese of Mercedes from 1959 until a year later, and he went on to serve as the rector of the Metropolitan Seminary of Villa Devoto from 1960 to 1964. He attended the Second Vatican Council from 1962 to 1964 as an expert.

On 24 March 1964, Pope Paul VI appointed him auxiliary bishop of La Plata and titular bishop of Caeciri. He received his episcopal consecration on 31 May 1964 from Antonio José Plaza. He attended the later sessions of the Second Vatican Council in 1964 and 1965 as a bishop, no longer as an expert. In 1967, he was named to serve briefly as apostolic administrator of the Avellaneda.

Pironio served as the Secretary-General of the Latin American Episcopal Council from 1967 to 1972. He also attended the Synod of Bishops from 29 September to 29 October 1967, and later attended the Second General Conference of the Latin American Episcopate from 24 August to 6 September 1968 in Colombia. He attended two additional synods in 1969 and in 1971. Pironio was elected president of the Latin American Episcopal Conference in 1972, served until 1974, and was confirmed for an extra year.

He was named the bishop of Mar del Plata on 19 April 1972. He preached the Lenten spiritual exercises for Pope Paul VI and the Roman Curia in 1974. On 20 September 1975 he was named pro-prefect of the Congregation for Institutes of Consecrated Life and Societies of Apostolic Life and made titular archbishop of Thiges. He became prefect of that Congregation when he became a cardinal and held that office until 1984. Pironio also attended the synod of 1974 as a relator and as a member of its general secretariat.

On 24 May 1976, Pope Paul made him Cardinal-Deacon of Santi Cosma e Damiano. He participated in the synod of 1977 and served as a cardinal elector in the papal conclaves of August and October 1978 that elected Pope John Paul I and Pope John Paul II. He was thought to be a possible candidate for election as pope in that year. In 1979, he attended the Third General Conference of the Latin American Episcopate in Mexico, and later a synod in 1980 and 1983.

On 8 April 1984 Pope John Paul II named him president of the Pontifical Council for the Laity. In that position, together with John Paul II, Pironio was a promoter of the first World Youth Day. He served at seven additional synods during the next decade. After ten years as a cardinal-deacon, he took the option of becoming a cardinal-priest while retaining his titular church. On 11 July 1995 John Paul named him Cardinal-Bishop of the suburbicarian see of Sabina-Poggio Mirteto.

Pironio attended the Fourth General Conference of the Latin American Episcopal Conference in 1992 in the Dominican Republic and was appointed papal envoy to the 5th National Marian Congress in Ecuador in 1992. He retired as president of the Pontifical Council for the Laity in 1996.

=== Death ===
Pironio died in 1998 of bone cancer in Rome. John Paul II presided over the funeral rites with 27 cardinals also in attendance. His remains were taken to Buenos Aires and after a Mass presided over by Cardinal Antonio Quarracino, his remains were buried in the left lateral altar of the Basilica of Our Lady of Luján.

== Process of beatification ==
The approval to commence the cause was granted on 24 March 2006 – which granted him the posthumous title Servant of God – and commenced in Rome on 23 June 2006. On 28 June 2006 Cardinal Camillo Ruini, Vicar for the Diocese of Rome, stated in an edict that "with the passing of years, his fame for sanctity has increased, and therefore it has been formally requested that we begin his cause of beatification and canonization".

The Archdiocesan Tribunal of Buenos Aires initiated the Argentine phase of the beatification process on 22 February 2007 and it heard the testimony of approximately thirty-three witnesses. The diocesan process concluded its work in Rome on 11 March 2016 and submitted its documentation to the Congregation for the Causes of Saints.

Pope Francis named Pironio "Venerable" after confirming that Pironio lived a life of heroic virtue on 18 February 2022.

The postulator assigned was the Benedictine Giuseppe Tamburrino and the vice-postulator was Professor Beatriz Buzzetti.

The miracle required for beatification was brought to the attention of officials of the cause and the formal diocesan process for the investigation of the miracle commenced in 2008; it concluded in August 2014. Pironio was beatified on 16 December 2023 at the Basilica of Our Lady of Luján, Luján, Buenos Aires by Cardinal Fernando Vérgez Alzaga on behalf of Pope Francis.

Catholic Church titles
Preceded by Marcos Gregorio McGrath	Titular Bishop of Caeciri; 24 March 1964 – 19 April 1972	Succeeded by Heraldo Camilo A. Barotto
Preceded by Avelar Brandão Vilela	President of the Latin American Episcopal Council; 1972–1975	Succeeded by Aloísio Lorscheider
Preceded by Enrique Rau	Bishop of Mar del Plata; 19 April 1972 – 20 September 1975	Succeeded by Rómulo García
Preceded by Georg Moser	Titular Archbishop of Thiges; 20 September 1975 – 24 May 1976	Succeeded by Eugeen Laridon
Preceded by Arturo Tabera Araoz	Prefect for the Congregation for Institutes of Consecrated Life and Societies of Apostolic Life; 20 September 1975 – 8 April 1984	Succeeded by Jean Jérôme Hamer
Preceded by Johannes Willebrands	Cardinal-Deacon of Santi Cosma e Damiano; 24 May 1976 – 22 June 1987	Succeeded by Himself as Cardinal-Priest
Preceded by Opilio Rossi	President of the Pontifical Council for the Laity; 8 April 1984 – 20 August 1996	Succeeded by James Stafford
Preceded by Fiorenzo Angelini	President of the Pontifical Council for Health Care Workers; 16 February 1985 – 1 March 1989	Succeeded by Fiorenzo Angelini
Preceded by Himself as Cardinal-Deacon	Cardinal-Deacon pro hac vice of Santi Cosma e Damiano; 22 June 1987 – 11 July 1995	Succeeded by Giovanni Cheli
Preceded by Agnelo Rossi	Cardinal-Bishop of Sabina-Poggio Mirteto; 11 July 1995 – 2 February 1998	Succeeded by Lucas Moreira Neves
