= Oscar Sarlinga =

Argentine Roman Catholic bishop

Oscar Domingo Sarlinga
- Bishop Emeritus of Zárate-Campana
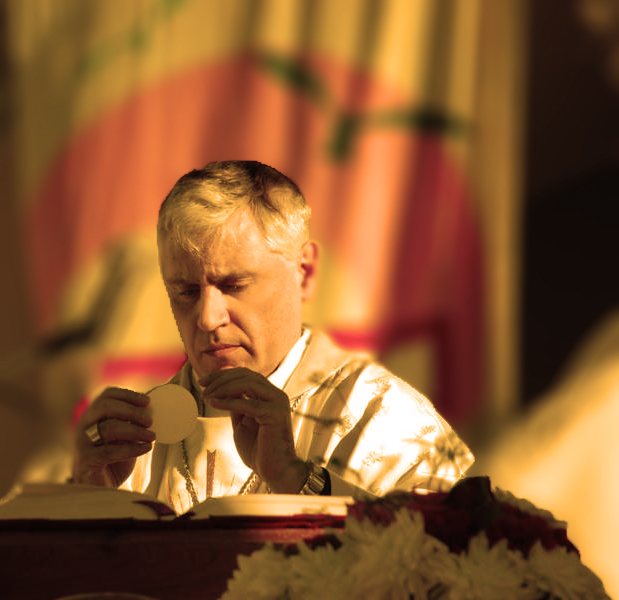
- Church: Catholic Church
- Diocese: Diocese of Zárate-Campana
- In office: 3 February 2006 – 3 November 2015
- Predecessor: Rafael Eleuterio Rey
- Successor: Pedro María Laxague
- Previous posts: Titular Bishop of Uzalis (2003-2006); Auxiliary Bishop of Mercedes-Luján (2003-2006)

Orders
- Ordination: 30 April 1990
- Consecration: 17 May 2003 by Rubén Héctor di Monte

Personal details
- Born: 20 May 1963 (age 63) Buenos Aires, Argentina

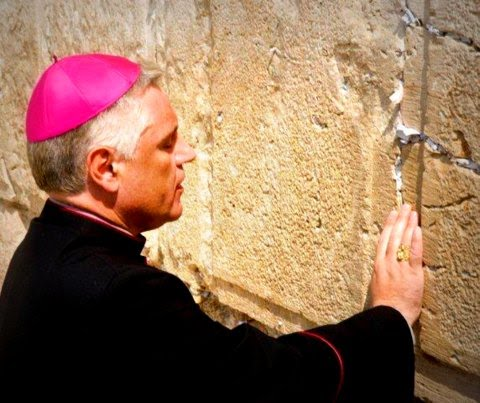
Mgr Oscar visiting the Wall of Lamentations in Jerusalem

Oscar Domingo Sarlinga (born 20 May 1963) is an Argentine Roman Catholic bishop, who is currently emeritus.

== Early life ==
Sarlinga born in Buenos Aires city on 20 May 1963. He did his primary studies at Nuestra Señora de Luján School, in San Andrés de Giles, and secondaries in Fray Mamerto Esquiu School, in that same city. He has also a degree in French Language Studies at the Alliance Française of Buenos Aires, Italian Language and Literature from Dante Alighieri Academy and several other languages, Italian, French, German, Romanian, Greek, Portuguese, Arabic, Danish and Yiddish including Native proficiency in English.

== Priest ==
Once a priest, he earned a degree in Theology with Moral Guidance by the University of Fribourg (Switzerland), a degree in Canon Law from the Pontifical University of Salamanca (Spain) and years later a Doctorate in Dogmatic Theology from the Pontifical University of the Holy Cross, Rome.

Regarding his church life and the mission that he has played in the church, he was ordained priest on April 30, 1990, and named parochial vicar at the Cathedral Basilica of Mercedes-Luján, then Diocesan Counsel of Catholic Action and Episcopal Delegate for Youth Ministry. In 1991 he was appointed to the pastoral "in solidum" in the same cathedral in August 1992 and sent to Switzerland to continue mentioned late post-graduate studies with Prof. Servais Pinckaers. The bishop of Lausanne, Genève et Fribourg asks for a pastoral service in the diocese and in 1993 was appointed parochial administrator of the parish of Belfaux in canton Fribourg, in the Franco-Germanic language border in that area of Switzerland. He then performed a pastoral experience in Germany, in the diocese of Mainz, in the parish of Heppenheim am der Bergstrasse.

Back in Argentina, he was named episcopal vicar for legal affairs of the diocese of Mercedes-Luján. At the same time he was a professor of professional ethics for lawyers at the Catholic University of Salvador, located in the town of Mercedes.

On May 7, 1996, he was appointed rector of the Diocesan Seminary "Cura de Ars', in the city of Mercedes, a position he held until 2001. On April 29, 2000, he was appointed general vicar of the archdiocese, following a year as rector of the seminary.

== Bishop ==
On April 12, 2003, Pope John Paul II appointed him Titular Bishop of Uzalis and auxiliary of the Archdiocese of Mercedes-Luján. He was consecrated on May 17, 2003, at the Cathedral Basilic of Nuestra Señora de las Mercedes by principal consecrator Rubén Di Monte, Archbishop of Mercedes-Luján and co-consecrators Cardinal Jorge Mario Bergoglio, Archbishop of Buenos Aires, and Emilio Ogñénovich, Archbishop Emeritus of Mercedes-Luján. During the first half of episcopate in the Episcopal Conference he was a member of "Council of Legal Affairs" and the "Commission of Ministries." From 2005 to 2008 he was a member of the "Social Pastoral Commission" and the “Commission for Ecumenism, Dialogue with Judaism, Islam and other religions." In 2008 he was reelected in the "Social Pastoral Commission". He is member of the "Council of economic issues" since 2011.

On February 3, 2006, Pope Benedict XVI appointed Sarlinga Bishop of Zárate-Campana which also encompasses Pilar, Escobar, Exaltación de la Cruz, San Antonio de Areco and Baradero. He took possession of the see on February 18, 2006.

In 2008, he was the focus of an unsuccessful plot to remove Cardinal Bergoglio from his office of Archbishop of Buenos Aires due to conflict between Bergoglio and the Kirchner administration. It would have had Bergoglio moved to a curial office in Rome and had Sarlinga become his replacement as Archbishop. Sarlinga has confirmed that the plot existed, though he denies involvement in it.

In 2009 he received the Italian "Ciociaria" prize (Premio Nazionale Ciociaria) in respect of its work for the "brotherhood of peoples". The awards ceremony took place on March 27 at the Theatre of Fiuggi.

The Vatican announced on 3 November 2015 that Bishop Sarlinga had resigned.

== Writings ==
- «Kościół argentyński wobec wyzwań społecznych XXI wieku» -Challenges of the Argentinian Church in the 21st Century- (Centrum Studiów Latynoamerykańskich. Uniwersytet, University of Varsovia, 2004)
- «The ecclesial mission for the integral and solidary humanism. And esencial relation» (Pont. Università della Santa Croce, Rome, 2005)
- «The ethic of being and responsibility, for the construction of a true humanism» (Belgrano University, Buenos Aires, 2007)
