= Serafini =

According to the Dictionary of American Family Names, "Serafini" is a plural form of the surname "Serafino", which itself is an Italian given name. According to one website, the surname's origin dates to 400 B.C. There has been a suggestion that "Serafini" was a baptismal name rather than a surname in at least some cases in the 17th century.

Serafini may refer to:

- Amadeus Serafini (born 1990), American actor
- Andrew A. Serafini (born 1962), American politician from Maryland
- Anunciado Serafini (1898–1963), Argentine Roman Catholic Bishop
- Camillo Serafini (died 1952), Italian Marquis and Governor of Vatican City
- Cristina Serafini (born 1978), Italian actress
- Dan Serafini (born 1974), left-handed Major League Baseball relief pitcher
- Dom Serafini (born 1949), Italian journalist and author, based in New York City
- Domenico Serafini (1852–1918), Italian cardinal
- Dorino Serafini (1909–2000), motorcycle road racer and racing driver
- Frank Serafini (born 1945), former Republican member of the Pennsylvania House of Representatives
- Giovanni Serafini (1786–1855), Italian cardinal
- Giulio Serafini (1867–1938), Italian cardinal
- Joe Serafini (born 1998), American actor
- Laurie Serafini (born 1958), former Australian rules footballer
- Luigi Serafini (artist) (born 1949), Italian artist, architect and designer
- Luigi Serafini (basketball) (born 1951), Italian basketball player
- Luigi Serafini (cardinal) (1808–1894), Italian Roman Catholic cardinal
- Matteo Serafini (born 1978), Italian football player
- Mattia Serafini (born 1983), Italian footballer
- Palmiro Serafini (born 1945), Italian ski mountaineer and former cross-country skier
- Renato Serafini (born 1953), former Australian rules footballer
- Ron Serafini (born 1953), retired professional ice hockey player
- Sebastiano Serafini (born 1990), Italian actor, model, musician and stylist
- Serafino de' Serafini, Italian painter
- Thaisa Serafini (born 1985), Brazilian professional squash player

== Fictional characters ==
- Angelo Serafini, birthname of David Chow fictional character from the CBS soap opera The Young and the Restless
