= Jerónimo Podestá =

Argentine Catholic bishop (1920–2000)

- Titular Bishop of Horrea Aninici
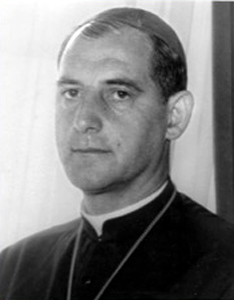
- Podestá in the 1960s
- Church: Catholic Church
- Diocese: Diocese of Avellaneda-Lanús
- In office: 2 December 1967 – 1972
- Successor: Abraham Desta
- Previous post: Bishop of Avellaneda-Lanús (1962-1967)

Orders
- Ordination: 15 September 1946
- Consecration: 22 December 1962 by Antonio José Plaza
- Rank: Diocesan bishop (1962-1967); Titular bishop (1967-1971)

Personal details
- Born: Jerónimo José Podestá; 8 August 1920 Ramos Mejía, Buenos Aires Province, Argentina
- Died: 23 June 2000 (aged 79) Buenos Aires, Argentina
- Denomination: Catholic Church
- Spouse: Clelia Luro
- Occupation: Catholic priest (since 1940); Catholic bishop (since 1962)
- Education: Pontifical Gregorian University

Jerónimo José Podestá (August 8, 1920 – June 23, 2000) was an Argentine Catholic bishop.

== Life ==
Podestá was born in Ramos Mejía, Greater Buenos Aires, Argentina, on August 8, 1920. He entered the seminary of La Plata in 1940. He was ordained a priest in 1946. He also studied at the Pontifical Gregorian University in Rome. After graduating in 1950 he taught at the seminary until 1962. On September 25, 1962, he was named a bishop along with other progressive priests, including Eduardo Pironio and Antonio Quarracino, both later cardinals. He received his episcopal consecration on December 22, 1962 from Antonio José Plaza, Archbishop of La Plata.

Podestá was 2nd bishop of Diocese of Avellaneda-Lanús from 1962 until 1967. He participated in three of the Second Vatican Council's four sessions, having missed the first and part of the second because he was not yet a bishop.

In 1966, Podestá met Clelia Luro, who was separated from her husband and with six children. He began a relationship with her that led to his resignation in the following year.

Luro recounts that in 1967 he had a confrontation with the papal nuncio, Umberto Mozzoni, but she gives no details except to say that it was decisive for his replacement as Bishop of Avellaneda. On November 1, Mozzoni requested his resignation. According to Ezequiel Perteagudo, this was part of an agreement between President Juan Carlos Onganía, Archbishop Antonio José Plaza of La Plata and Archbishop Mozzoni, whereby the government took no action with regard to the 1965 crash of the Banco Popular de la Plata in return for the removal of Podestá; and Luro said in a book published in 2011 that Podestá's removal by the Church was paid for by a government subsidy for the Catholic University of Argentina, and that Plaza gained by the government covering up the bank affair. Podestá agreed to resign on condition that he could speak to Pope Paul VI in January. Sources cited by the New York Times blamed his removal on his "outspoken attacks on the Government's economic policies", his appearance at labor union rallies, and the influence of conservative Catholics who opposed his enthusiastic support of the Second Vatican Council's reforms. Onganía, who had taken power in a coup d'etat that its leaders called the Argentine Revolution, had told Podestá in July 1967 that he was "the main enemy of the Argentine Revolution". Podestá denied charges that he maintained contact with the followers of Juan Perón, who had ruled Argentina from 1946 to 1955. Perteagudo says that, after being asked to resign, Podestá went to Rome and was assured by Pope Paul VI that nothing would happen, but that, three days after his return to Argentina, he received notification from Rome that his resignation was accepted. News of his resignation was published on L'Osservatore Romano on 2 December 1967. After his resignation became public in December, he attacked Mozzoni for leaking the news. Church officials suggested Podestá had resigned due to health problems and denied any pressure from the government.

In 1972, Podestá married Luro. At times he and his wife celebrated Mass together. While he is sometimes spoken of as laicized, he was only suspended from the exercise of the priesthood.

He left Argentina in 1974 after repeated threats from the death squads of the Alianza Anticomunista Argentina (Argentine Anti-Communist Alliance) and returned in 1983 after the overthrow of the military dictatorship.

Podestá was the president of the Federación Latinoamericana de Sacerdotes Casados (Latin American Federation of Married Priests).

By the time of his death he was poor and had largely been forgotten. When Podestá was dying, Archbishop of Buenos Aires Jorge Mario Bergoglio, S.J. (later Pope Francis), reached out to him and his wife. He was the only Argentine church official to visit Podestá in the hospital. Luro later said that Bergoglio defended her from the sharpest Vatican attacks on her for marrying Podestá.

He died in Buenos Aires on June 23, 2000. Argentine writer Ernesto Sabato later said he had "suffered injustice, lack of understanding, slander and gossip".

Clelia Luro de Podestá died in Buenos Aires on November 4, 2013.

== Works ==
- La violencia del amor (1968)
- La revolución del hombre nuevo (1969)
- Hombre, Iglesia y liberación (1971)
- El Vaticano dice no: sacerdocio y matrimonio, with Clelia Luro (1992)
