= Ariel Edgardo Torrado Mosconi =

The Most Reverend Ariel Edgardo Torrado Mosconi
- Bishop of Nueve de Julio
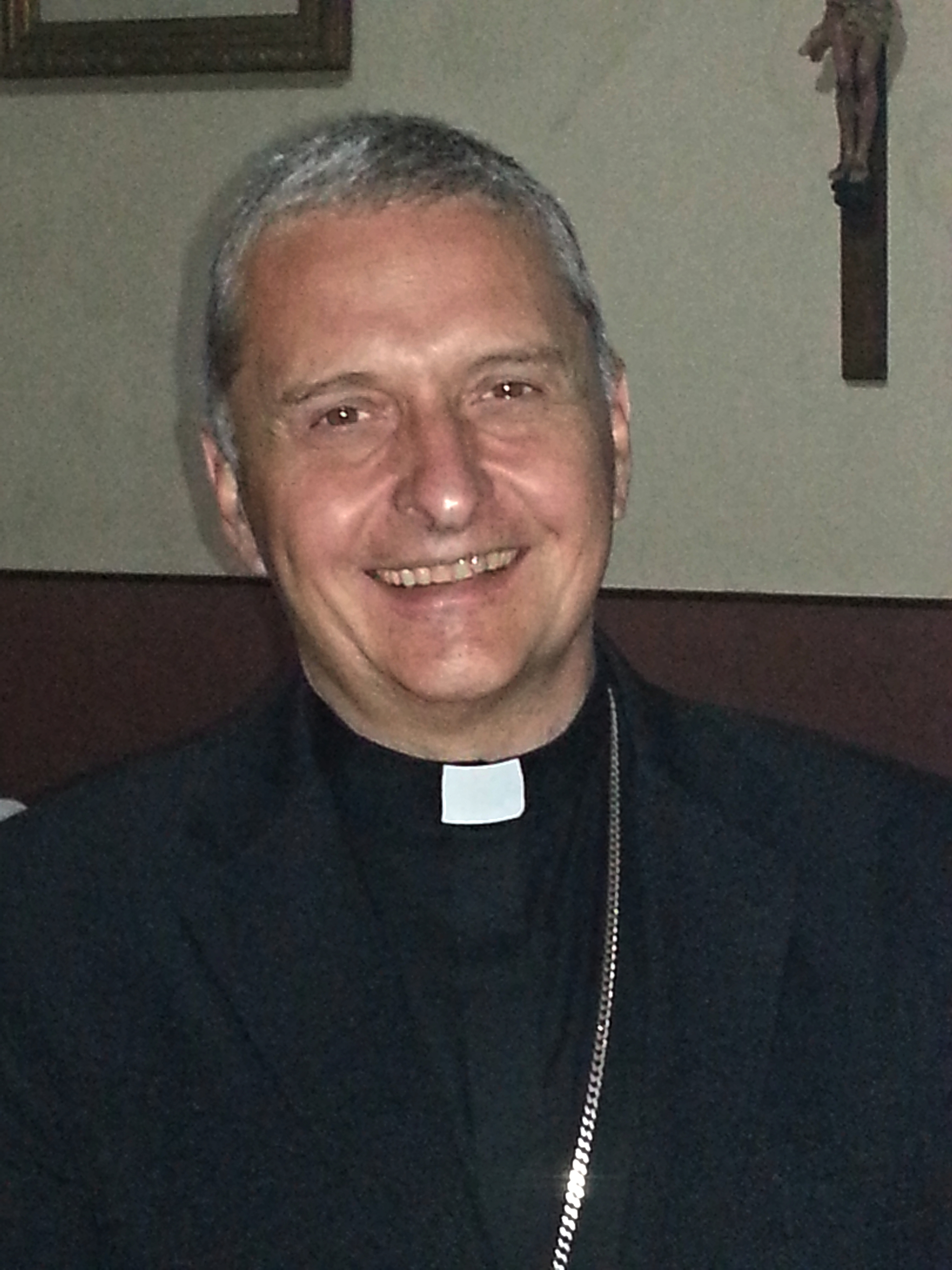
- Torrado Mosconi in late 2014.
- Church: Roman Catholic Church
- Diocese: Nueve de Julio
- See: Nueve de Julio
- Appointed: 1 December 2015
- Predecessor: Martín de Elizalde
- Previous posts: Titular Bishop of Vicus Pacati (2008-15); Auxiliary Bishop of Santiago del Estero (2008-15); Coadjutor Bishop of Nueve de Julio (2015)

Orders
- Ordination: 17 November 1990 by Antonio Quarracino
- Consecration: 13 December 2008 by Jorge Mario Bergoglio

Personal details
- Born: Ariel Edgardo Torrado Mosconi; 18 January 1961 (age 65) Veinticinco de Mayo Partido, Buenos Aires, Argentina
- Education: Pontifical Catholic University of Argentina
- Motto: Sequere me
- Coat of arms

Ariel Edgardo Torrado Mosconi (January 18, 1961) is an Argentine prelate of the Catholic Church who has been bishop of the Nueve de Julio since December 2015, after serving six months as coadjutor there. He was an auxiliary bishop of Santiago del Estero from 2008 to 2015.

== Life ==
Born in Veinticinco de Mayo, Torrado Mosconi was ordained a priest on 17 November 1990 for the archdiocese of Buenos Aires.

On 22 November 2008, Pope Benedict XVI appointed him auxiliary bishop of Santiago del Estero and titular bishop of Vicus Pacati. Torrado Mosconi received his episcopal consecration on 13 December from Cardinal Jorge Mario Bergoglio, Archbishop of Buenos Aires, the future Pope Francis, with the Bishop of Santiago del Estero, Francisco Polti Santillán, and the auxiliary bishop of La Plata, Antonio Marino, serving as co-consecrators.

On 12 May 2015, Pope Francis named him bishop coadjutor of Nueve de Julio and he succeeded as bishop there when his predecessor's resignation was accepted on 1 December.
