= Emilio Ogñénovich =

Argentine Catholic bishop

- Archbishop of Mercedes-Luján
- Archdiocese: Mercedes-Luján
- See: Mercedes-Luján
- Appointed: 8 June 1982
- Installed: 10 June 1982
- Term ended: 7 March 2000
- Predecessor: Luis Juan Tomé
- Successor: Rubén Héctor di Monte
- Previous posts: Auxiliary Bishop of Bahía Blanca (1979–1982); Titular Bishop of Mibiarca (1979–1982)

Orders
- Ordination: 17 December 1949 by Anunciado Serafini
- Consecration: 18 November 1979 by Jorge Mayer

Personal details
- Born: 25 January 1923 Olavarría, Argentina
- Died: 29 January 2011 (aged 88)
- Denomination: Roman Catholic

Ordination history of Emilio Ogñénovich
History
Priestly ordination
- Ordained by: Anunciado Serafini (Mercedes)
Episcopal consecration
- Principal consecrator: Jorge Mayer (Bahía Blanca)
- Co-consecrators: Alejo Benedicto Gilligan (Nueve de Julio; Rómulo García (Mar del Plata)
Episcopal succession
Bishops consecrated by Emilio Ogñénovich as principal consecrator
- Herberto Celso Angelo: 19 March 1991

Emilio Ogñénovich (January 25, 1923 – January 29, 2011) was the Catholic bishop of the Archdiocese of Mercedes-Luján, Argentina. Ogñénovich was born to a father from Cetinje and a mother "from Zadar or Split"; they both died when he was ten years old. Ordained to the priesthood in 1949, Ogñénovich was named in bishop in 1979 retiring in 2000. He died in 2011, four days after his 88th birthday.

On 27 June 1992 he was co-consecrator of Jorge Mario Bergoglio, later Pope Francis, as bishop.
