= Luis Juan Tomé =

- Bishop of Mercedes
- Church: Catholic Church
- Diocese: Diocese of Mercedes
- In office: 26 July 1963 – 25 September 1981
- Predecessor: Anunciado Serafini
- Successor: Emilio Ogñénovich

Orders
- Ordination: 16 April 1938
- Consecration: 15 September 1963 by Antonio Caggiano

Personal details
- Born: 19 July 1914 Buenos Aires, Argentina
- Died: 25 September 1981 (aged 67)

Luis Juan Tomé (19 July 1914 – 25 September 1981) was a prelate of the Roman Catholic Church. He served as bishop of Mercedes from 1963 till his death in 1981.

== Life ==
Born in Buenos Aires, Tomé was ordained to the priesthood on 16 April 1938, serving in the archdiocese of Buenos Aires.

On 26 July 1963, he was appointed bishop of Mercedes. Tomé received his episcopal consecration on the following 15 September from Antonio Cardinal Caggiano, archbishop of Buenos Aires, with the archbishop of Tucumán, Juan Carlos Aramburu, who would later become a cardinal, and the bishop of Rosario, Guillermo Bolatti, serving as co-consecrators.

Tomé was a council father at the second, third and fourth session of the Second Vatican Council.

He died on 25 September 1981.
