= Alfredo Mario Espósito Castro =

Alfredo Mario Espósito Castro (20 May 1927 – 1 January 2010) was the first bishop of the Catholic Diocese of Zárate-Campana, Argentina.

Espósito Castro was of Argentine nationality, although he was born in Naples, Italy, where his father was the Argentine consul.

Espósito Castro was ordained to the priesthood for the Congregation of Missionary Sons of the Immaculate Heart of the Blessed Virgin Mary, known as the Claretians, on 1 August 1954.

He was named bishop by Pope Paul VI on 21 April 1976. He was ordained a bishop on 4 July 1976 by Pío Laghi, the apostolic nuncio, with Ramón José Castellano, the archbishop of Córdoba, and Claretian José María Márquez Bernal, prelate of the Roman Catholic Territorial Prelature of Humahuaca, as co-consecrators. The ceremony was celebrated in the presence of the Argentine cardinal primate Juan Carlos Aramburu, the archbishop of Buenos Aires.

He took possession of his see on 4 July 1976, where he was installed by Antonio José Plaza, archbishop of the Archdiocese of La Plata.

He resigned on 18 December 1991 for health reasons.

He died 1 January 2010 in Buenos Aires.
