= Archdiocese of Mercedes-Luján =

Catholic ecclesiastical territory

Coordinates: 34.6515°S 59.4316°W

Archdiocese of Mercedes-Luján Archidioecesis Mercedensis-Luianensis Arquidiócesis de Mercedes-Luján

Catholic
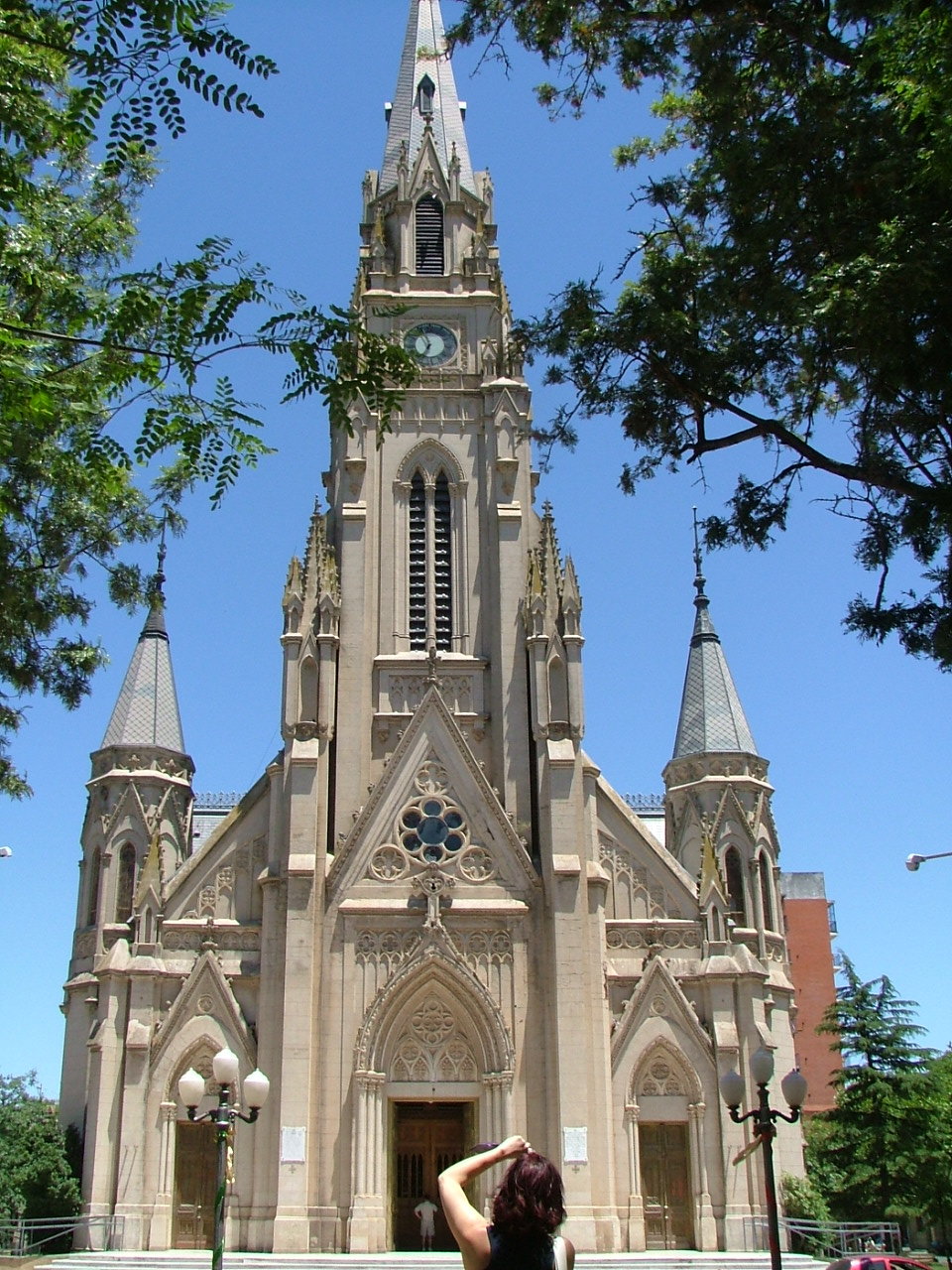
- Catedral Basílica de Mercedes-Luján

Location
- Country: Argentina
- Metropolitan: Mercedes-Luján

Statistics
- Area: 19,330 km^{2} (7,460 sq mi)
- Population: Total; Catholics: (as of 2004); 712,000; 689,300 (96.8%)

Information
- Denomination: Roman Catholic
- Sui iuris church: Latin Church
- Rite: Roman Rite
- Established: 20 April 1934
- Cathedral: Cathedral Basilica of Our Lady of Mercy
- Patron saint: Virgin of Mercy; Our Lady of Luján

Current leadership
- Pope: Leo XIV
- Archbishop: Jorge Eduardo Scheinig

Website
- Website of the Archdiocese

The Archdiocese of Mercedes-Luján (Spanish: Arquidiócesis Mercedes-Luján; Latin: Archidioecesis Mercedensis-Luianensis) is a Latin Church ecclesiastical territory or archdiocese of the Catholic Church in north-central Buenos Aires Province, Argentina. It was immediately subject to the Holy See, coming into 2019. Erected as the Diocese of Mercedes on 20 April 1934, it was renamed as the Diocese of Mercedes-Luján on 10 May 1989 and elevated to its status as an archdiocese on 21 November 1997. Its mother church is the Catedral Basílica de Mercedes-Luján in Mercedes.

On 4 March 2019, Pope Francis raised it to a metropolitan archdiocese, with three suffragan dioceses within its ecclesiastical province. The suffragan dioceses are Merlo-Moreno, Nueve de Julio, and Zárate-Campana. The first had been in the Buenos Aires province, and the other two were in the La Plata province. Francis also appointed the first metropolitan archbishop, Jorge Eduardo Scheinig, who had been titular bishop of Ita.

== Bishops ==
=== Ordinaries ===
- Juan Pascual Chimento (1934–1938), appointed Archbishop of La Plata
- Anunciado Serafini (1939–1963)
- Luis Juan Tomé (1963–1981)
- Emilio Ogñénovich (1982–2000)
- Rubén Héctor di Monte (2000–2007)
- Agustín Roberto Radrizzani, SDB (2007–2019)
- Jorge Eduardo Scheinig (2019–present)

=== Auxiliary bishops ===
- Vicente Alfredo Aducci (1960–1962)
- Herberto Celso Angelo (1990–1993)
- Oscar Domingo Sarlinga (2003–2006), appointed Bishop of Zárate-Campana
- Jorge Eduardo Scheinig (2017–2019), appointed Archbishop here

=== Other priests of this diocese who became bishops ===
- Antonio Quarracino, appointed Bishop of Nueve de Julio in 1962; future Cardinal
- Eduardo Francisco Pironio, appointed Auxiliary Bishop of La Plata in 1964; future Cardinal

== Territory ==
The archdiocese serves fifteen partidos in Buenos Aires Province:

- Alberti Partido
- Carmen de Areco Partido
- Chacabuco Partido
- Chivilcoy Partido
- General Las Heras Partido
- General Rodríguez Partido
- Junín Partido
- Leandro N. Alem Partido
- Lobos Partido
- Luján Partido
- Marcos Paz Partido
- Mercedes Partido
- Navarro Partido
- San Andrés de Giles Partido
- Suipacha Partido

Territorial losses
Year	Along with	To form
1947	Archdiocese of La Plata	Diocese of San Nicolás de los Arroyos
1957	Diocese of Azul	Diocese of Nueve de Julio
1957	Diocese of Bahía Blanca	Diocese of Santa Rosa
