= Vicus Pacati =

Former Roman city and modern titular see in North Africa

Vicus Pacati was an ancient city and former episcopal see in Roman North Africa, which only remains as a Latin Church titular see of the Catholic Church.

== History ==
The name refers to the vicus (area, quarter, district) constituting the latifundia of the family Arii Pacati.

It was among the many cities of sufficient importance to become a suffragan diocese in the Roman province of Numidia, but faded so completely that its location is not even identified for sure with modern Aïn-Mechara in Algeria.

Two of its bishops are historically documented :

- Flavianus, participant at the Council of Carthage called in 484 by king Huneric of the Vandal Kingdom and afterward exiled like most Catholic bishops, unlike their schismatic Donatist (heretic) counterparts
- Florentianus, attended the Council of Carthage in 525.

== Titular see ==
The diocese was nominally restored in 1933 as Latin titular see of Vicus Pacati (Latin) / Vico di Pacato (Curiate Italian) / Pacaten(sis) (Latin adjective)

It has had the following incumbents:

- Bishop-elect Tomás Balduino, Dominican Order (O.P.) (1967.08.15 – 1967.11.10) as Coadjutor Bishop-Prelate of Territorial Prelature of Santíssima Conceição do Araguaia (Brazil) (1967.08.15 – 1967.11.10); later Bishop of Goiás (Brazil) (1967.11.10 – retired 1998.12.02), died 2014
- Johannes Joachim Degenhardt (1968.03.12 – 1974.04.04) as Auxiliary Bishop of Archdiocese of Paderborn (Germany) (1968.03.12 – 1974.04.04); later succeeded as Metropolitan Archbishop of Paderborn (1974.04.04 – death 2002.07.25), created Cardinal-Priest of S. Liborio (2001.02.21 [2001.10.14] – 2002.07.25)
- Adolfo Hernández Hurtado (1974.12.12 – death 2004.10.15) as Auxiliary Bishop of Archdiocese of Guadalajara (Mexico) (1974.12.12 – retired 1997.03.20) and on emeritate; previously Bishop of Tapachula (Mexico) (1958.01.13 – 1970.09.06), Bishop of Zamora (Mexico) (1970.09.06 – 1974.12.12)
- Paul Hwang Cheol-soo (황철수 바오로) (2006.01.17 – 2007.11.21) as Auxiliary Bishop of Diocese of Busan 부산 (South Korea) (2006.01.17 – 2007.11.21); next succeeded as Bishop of Busan 부산 (2007.11.21 – ...)
- Ariel Edgardo Torrado Mosconi (2008.11.22 – 2015.05.12) as Auxiliary Bishop of Diocese of Santiago del Estero (Argentina) (2008.11.22 – 2015.05.12); next Coadjutor Bishop of Nueve de Julio (Argentina) (2015.05.12 – 2015.12.01), succeeding as Bishop of Nueve de Julio (2015.12.01 – ...)
- Alain Faubert (2016.04.19 – ...), Auxiliary Bishop of Archdiocese of Montreal (Canada) (2016.04.19 – ...).

== See also ==
- List of Catholic dioceses in Algeria

== Sources and external links ==
- GCatholic

Bibliography

- Pius Bonifacius Gams, Series episcoporum Ecclesiae Catholicae, Leipzig 1931, p. 469
- Stefano Antonio Morcelli, Africa christiana, Volume I, Brescia 1816, p. 353
- H. Jaubert, Anciens évêchés et ruines chrétiennes de la Numidie et de la Sitifienne, in Recueil des Notices et Mémoires de la Société archéologique de Constantine, vol. 46, 1913, pp. 101–102
