= Diocese of Zárate-Campana =

Catholic ecclesiastical territory

Diocese of Zárate-Campana Dioecesis Zaratensis-Campanensis Diócesis de Zárate-Campana

Catholic

Location
- Country: Argentina
- Ecclesiastical province: Mercedes-Luján
- Metropolitan: Mercedes-Luján
- Coordinates: 34.1645°S 58.9595°W

Statistics
- Area: 5,903 km^{2} (2,279 sq mi)
- Population: Total; Catholics: (as of 2010); 900,000; 636,000 (90.9%)
- Parishes: 38

Information
- Denomination: Roman Catholic
- Rite: Roman Rite
- Established: 21 April 1976 (50 years ago)
- Cathedral: Cathedral of St Florentina in Campana
- Co-cathedral: Co-Cathedral of the Nativity of the Lord in Belén de Escobar
- Patron saint: Our Lady of Luján; Saint Joseph

Current leadership
- Pope: Leo XIV
- Bishop: Pedro Maria Laxague
- Metropolitan Archbishop: Jorge Eduardo Scheinig
- Auxiliary Bishops: Justo Rodríguez Gallego
- Bishops emeritus: Oscar Domingo Sarlinga

Map
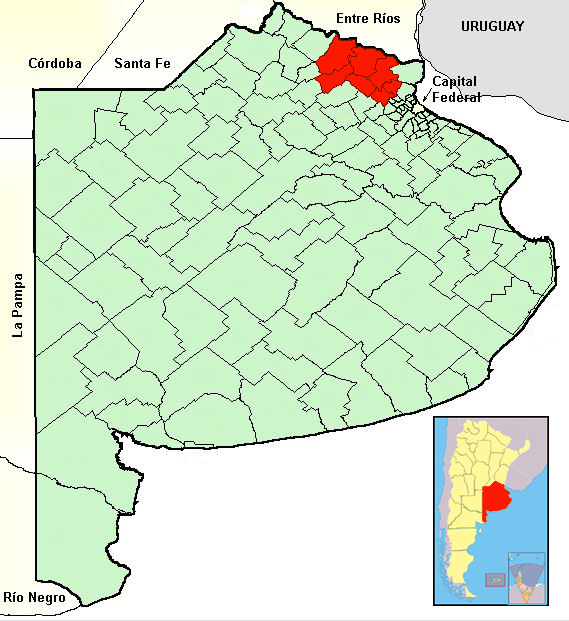

Website
- Website of the Diocese

The Roman Catholic Diocese of Zárate-Campana (Latin: Dioecesis Zaratensis-Campanensis) is a Latin rite suffragan diocese in the ecclesiastical province of the Archdiocese of Mercedes-Luján, in central Argentina on the Atlantic coast, having had a change of metropolitan from La Plata in 2019.

Its cathedral episcopal see is Catedral Santa Florentina, dedicated to Saint Florentina, in Campana, and it also has a co-cathedral: Cocatedral Natividad del Señor, dedicated to the Nativity of Our Lord, in Belén de Escobar, also in Buenos Aires Province.

== History ==
It was created by Pope Paul VI on 21 April 1976, by the Papal Bulla "Qui consilio divino" as Diocese of Zárate–Campana / Zaraten(sis)–Campanen(sis) (Latin adjective), on territories split off from the Diocese of San Isidro and from the Diocese of San Nicolás de los Arroyos. The first bishop, Claretian Mgr. Alfredo Mario Espósito Castro, chosen by Paul VI on 21 April 1976, received his episcopal consecration and took possession of the see on 4 July 1976.

== Extent and statistics ==
As of 2014, it pastorally served 660,000 Catholics (90.7% of 728,000 total) on 5,924 km² in 33 parishes and 89 missions with 88 priests (53 diocesan, 35 religious), 13 deacons, 178 lay religious (88 brothers, 90 sisters) and 27 seminarians.

It includes the cities of Campana (credited in its title), (Belén de) Escobar, Zarate, Baradero, Pilar, Exaltación de la Cruz and San Antonio de Areco, all in the northern part of Greater Buenos Aires.

== Bishops ==
=== Episcopal ordinaries ===
- Alfredo Mario Espósito Castro, Claretians (C.M.F.) (1976.04.21 – resigned because of health reasons on 18 December 1991), died 2010
- Rafael Eleuterio Rey (18 December 1991 (took see on 21 March 1992 – resigned because of health reasons 3 February 2006); previously Titular Bishop of Hilta (1983.04.30 – 1991.12.18) as Auxiliary Bishop of Archdiocese of Mendoza (Argentina) (1983.04.30 – 1991.12.18)
- Oscar Domingo Sarlinga (3 February 2006 – retired 2015.11.03), previously Titular Bishop of Uzalis (2003.04.12 – 2006.02.03) as Auxiliary Bishop of Archdiocese of Mercedes–Luján (Argentina) (2003.04.12 – 2006.02.03)
- Pedro Maria Laxague (3 November 2015 – ...), previously Titular Bishop of Castra Severiana (2006.11.14 – 2015.11.03) as Auxiliary Bishop of Archdiocese of Bahía Blanca (Argentina) (2006.11.14 – 2015.11.03).

=== Auxiliary bishop ===
- Justo Rodríguez Gallego (appointed 2020) (2021–

== See also ==
- List of Catholic dioceses in Argentina
