= Filippo Cortesi =

Italian Catholic bishop (1876–1947)

- Apostolic Nuncio to Poland
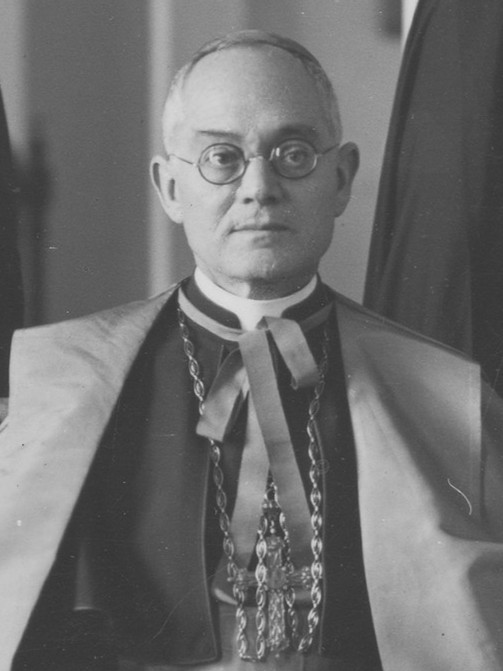
- Cortesi, photographed between 1936 and 1939
- Church: Roman Catholic Church
- Installed: 24 December 1936
- Term ended: 1 February 1947
- Predecessor: Francesco Marmaggi
- Successor: Luigi Poggi
- Other posts: Apostolic Nuncio to Venezuela (1921–1926); Titular Archbishop of Siraces (1921–1947); Apostolic Nuncio to Argentina (1926–1936); Apostolic Nuncio to Paraguay (1928–1936); Apostolic Nuncio to Spain (1936)

Orders
- Ordination: 18 December 1899
- Consecration: 21 August 1921 by Antonio Vico

Personal details
- Born: 8 October 1876 Alia, Sicily, Kingdom of Italy
- Died: 1 February 1947 (aged 70) Grottaferrata, Lazio, Italy

Ordination history
History
Episcopal consecration
- Principal consecrator: Antonio Vico
- Co-consecrators: Pietro Fumasoni Biondi, Sebastião Leite de Vasconcelos
Episcopal succession
Bishops consecrated by Filippo Cortesi as principal consecrator
- Miguel Antonio Mejía: 21 October 1923
- Lucas Guillermo Castillo: 21 October 1923
- Francisco Antonio Granadillo: 21 October 1923
- Tomás Antonio San Miguel Díaz: 21 October 1923
- Angelo Cesare Vigiani: 6 July 1924
- Abel Isidoro Antezana y Rojas: 15 March 1925
- Julio Garret: 15 March 1925
- Ramón Font y Farrés: 15 March 1925
- Cleto Loayza Gumiel: 15 March 1925
- Auguste Sieffert: 15 March 1925
- Enrique María Dubuc Moreno: 15 August 1926
- José María Bottaro: 5 December 1926
- Fermín Emilio Lafitte: 16 October 1927
- Audino Rodríguez y Olmos: 16 October 1927
- Julián Pedro Martínez: 16 October 1927
- Pedro Dionisio Tibiletti: 23 June 1929
- Miguel Paternain: 21 July 1929
- Agustín Barrere: 3 August 1930
- Agustín Rodríguez: 15 May 1932
- Emilio Sosa Gaona: 15 May 1932
- Vicente Peira: 21 December 1932
- Nicolás Fasolino: 21 December 1932
- Roberto José Tavella: 17 February 1935
- Carlos Francisco Hanlon: 17 February 1935
- Nicolás Esandi Nicolao: 17 February 1935
- Enrique José Mühn: 17 February 1935
- Leandro Astelarra: 3 March 1935
- Zenobio Lorenzo Guilland: 3 March 1935
- Antonio Caggiano: 17 March 1935
- Alfredo Viola: 23 August 1936
- Antonio María Barbieri: 8 November 1936
- Czesław Kaczmarek: 4 September 1938

Filippo Cortesi (8 October 1876 – 1 February 1947) was the Apostolic Nuncio to Argentina from 19 October 1926 to 4 June 1936, the Apostolic Nuncio to Poland from 24 December 1936 to 1 February 1947. Cortesi earlier served as nuncio to Paraguay in the interim. Cortesi was the only nuncio to Poland never to become a cardinal.

== Biography ==
As nuncio to Paraguay, Cortesi arranged a prisoner exchange between Paraguay and Bolivia during the Chaco War in 1934. As nuncio in Buenos Aires, Cortesi presented the Supreme Order of Christ, the highest papal order, to Argentine President Agustín Pedro Justo on behalf of Pope Pius XII later that year.

On 30 April 1939, on the eve of the German invasion of Poland, Cardinal Secretary of State Luigi Maglione sent a message—worded by Mussolini and personally approved by Pius XII—to Cortesi supporting the return of Danzig to Germany. Cortesi replied by cable, questioning the wisdom of such a concession, but Maglione ordered him to pass it on to the Polish president. The following day Pius XII issued a "last appeal in favor of peace" entreating the "governments of Germany and Poland do their utmost to avoid every incident and abstain from taking any step capable for worsening the present tension".

Cortesi submitted Pius XII's mediation plan to Foreign Minister Józef Beck, but received "an evasive answer because the Poles do not favour mediation as a means of solving the Danzig problem". Cortesi arrived in Rome on 22 June with noncommital replies from all five countries involved in the mediation, and met with Maglione over the mediation and also the rift between Polish and German Catholics. On June 26, Cortesi met with Pius XII personally to convey the negative reactions of President Ignacy Mościcki and Foreign Minister Beck to Pius XII's proposal to transfer Danzig to Germany. Cortesi's relaying of Pius XII's proposal to give Danzig to Germany was long remembered in Poland, particularly when the Communist government came into conflict with the pope after the war.

Cortesi fled his Warsaw nunciature on 5 September, following the Polish government-in-exile and arriving in Bucharest. The Vatican received word from Cortesi on 22 September from Bucharest, having been "completely cut off from the Catholics in Poland". At that time, all the Polish bishops—with the exception of Cardinal August Hlond, the primate of Poland (who was at that time expected to return soon)—were still in their bishoprics.

Although Pius XII said that he would not formally recognize the government-in-exile (then in Paris) until he received a full report from Cortesi, Kazimierz Papée, the ambassador from Poland, remained accredited to the Holy See. Pius XII recognized the government-in-exile "with as much formality as is possible under the circumstances" on 7 October, aided by the "convenient fact" that Cortesi was due to retire and could not return to Warsaw in any case. The New York Times reported that Cortesi "will not return to Warsaw even if a new Polish state is formed, but will return to Rome and await his almost certain elevation to the Cardinalate". The Times also reported that the nuncio to Paris would be made internuncio to the government-in-exile to avoid having to formally replace Cortesi. Alfredo Pacini was appointed chargé d'affaires while the government-in-exile remained in Paris, and William Godfrey took over as chargé d'affaires once the government-in-exile was forced to move to London in 1940.

The Vatican attempted to get the Nazis to greenlight Cortesi's return—as an apostolic visitor (a step below recognition of sovereignty). From Romania, Cortesi organized a relief effort to Poland. Cortesi eventually arrived in Rome, leaving Cesare Orsenigo, the nuncio to Germany, as the de facto nuncio to Poland. On 1 November 1939, Orsenigo's authority was formally extended to Poland.

== Episcopal succession ==
Having consecrated Zenobio Lorenzo Guilland to the episcopacy, Cortesi is in the episcopal lineage of Pope Francis.
