= Agustín Roberto Radrizzani =

Argentine Catholic bishop (1944–2020)

Agustín Roberto Radrizzani SDB
- Archbishop of Mercedes-Luján
- Church: Catholic Church
- Archdiocese: Archdiocese of Mercedes-Luján
- In office: 27 December 2007 – 4 October 2019
- Predecessor: Rubén Héctor di Monte
- Successor: Jorge Eduardo Scheinig
- Previous posts: Bishop of Lomas de Zamora (2001-2007); Bishop of Neuquén (1991-2001)

Orders
- Ordination: 25 March 1972 by Michele Pellegrino
- Consecration: 20 July 1991 by Argimiro Daniel Moure Piñeiro

Personal details
- Born: 22 September 1944 Avellaneda, Buenos Aires Province, Argentina
- Died: 2 September 2020 (aged 75) Junín, Buenos Aires Province, Argentina

Styles of Agustín Radrizzani
- Reference style: The Most Reverend
- Spoken style: Your Grace
- Religious style: Monsignor

Agustín Roberto Radrizzani, SDB (22 September 1944 – 2 September 2020) was an Argentine prelate of the Roman Catholic Church. He served as Archbishop of Mercedes-Luján from 2007 until 2019.

Radrizzani made his profession as a member of the Salesians of Don Bosco on 5 January 1968, and was ordained to the priesthood on 25 March 1972.

On 14 May 1991, he was appointed Bishop of Neuquén by Pope John Paul II. Radrizzani received his episcopal consecration on 20 July from Bishop Argimiro Moure Piñeiro, SDB, with Bishops Jaime de Nevares, SDB, and Jorge Meinvielle, SDB, serving as co-consecrators. He was installed as Neuquén's ordinary on 17 August of that same year.

He was later named Bishop of Lomas de Zamora on 24 April 2001, being installed on the following 23 June. After six years in the diocese, he was promoted by Pope Benedict XVI to Archbishop of Mercedes-Luján on 27 December 2007. Radrizzani was the first Salesian and member of any Roman Catholic religious institute to serve as Archbishop of that site.

Agustín Roberto Radrizzani died following a bout with COVID-19 on 2 September 2020, during the COVID-19 pandemic in Argentina.

Preceded by Jaime de Nevares, SDB	Bishop of Neuquén; 1991–2001	Succeeded by Marcelo Melani, SDB
Preceded by Desiderio Elso Collino	Bishop of Lomas de Zamora; 2001–2007	Succeeded by Jorge Ruben Lugones, S.J.
Preceded by Rubén Héctor di Monte	Archbishop of Mercedes-Luján; 2007–2019	Succeeded by Jorge Eduardo Scheinig
