= Zenobio Lorenzo Guilland =

Argentine bishop (1890–1962)

- Archbishop of Paraná
- Church: Roman Catholic Church
- Archdiocese: Paraná
- Appointed: 18 September 1934
- Installed: 23 March 1935
- Term ended: 12 February 1962
- Predecessor: Julián Pedro Martínez
- Successor: Adolfo Servando Tortolo

Orders
- Ordination: 28 October 1914
- Consecration: 3 March 1935 by Filippo Cortesi

Personal details
- Born: 24 December 1890 San Andrés de Giles, Buenos Aires Province, Argentina
- Died: 12 February 1962 (aged 71)

Ordination history
History
Episcopal consecration
- Principal consecrator: Filippo Cortesi
- Co-consecrators: Miguel de Andrea, César Antonio Cáneva
Episcopal succession
Bishops consecrated by Zenobio Lorenzo Guilland as principal consecrator
- Anunciado Serafini: 25 July 1935
- Antonio José Plaza: 25 July 1950
- Adolfo Servando Tortolo: 12 August 1956
- Fortunato Antonio Rossi: 22 October 1961

Zenobio Lorenzo Guilland (24 December 1890 – 12 February 1962) was the Archbishop of Paraná, Argentina. Having consecrated Anunciado Serafini to the episcopacy, Guilland is in the episcopal lineage of Pope Francis.
