= Gowland, Buenos Aires =

Gowland
- Town
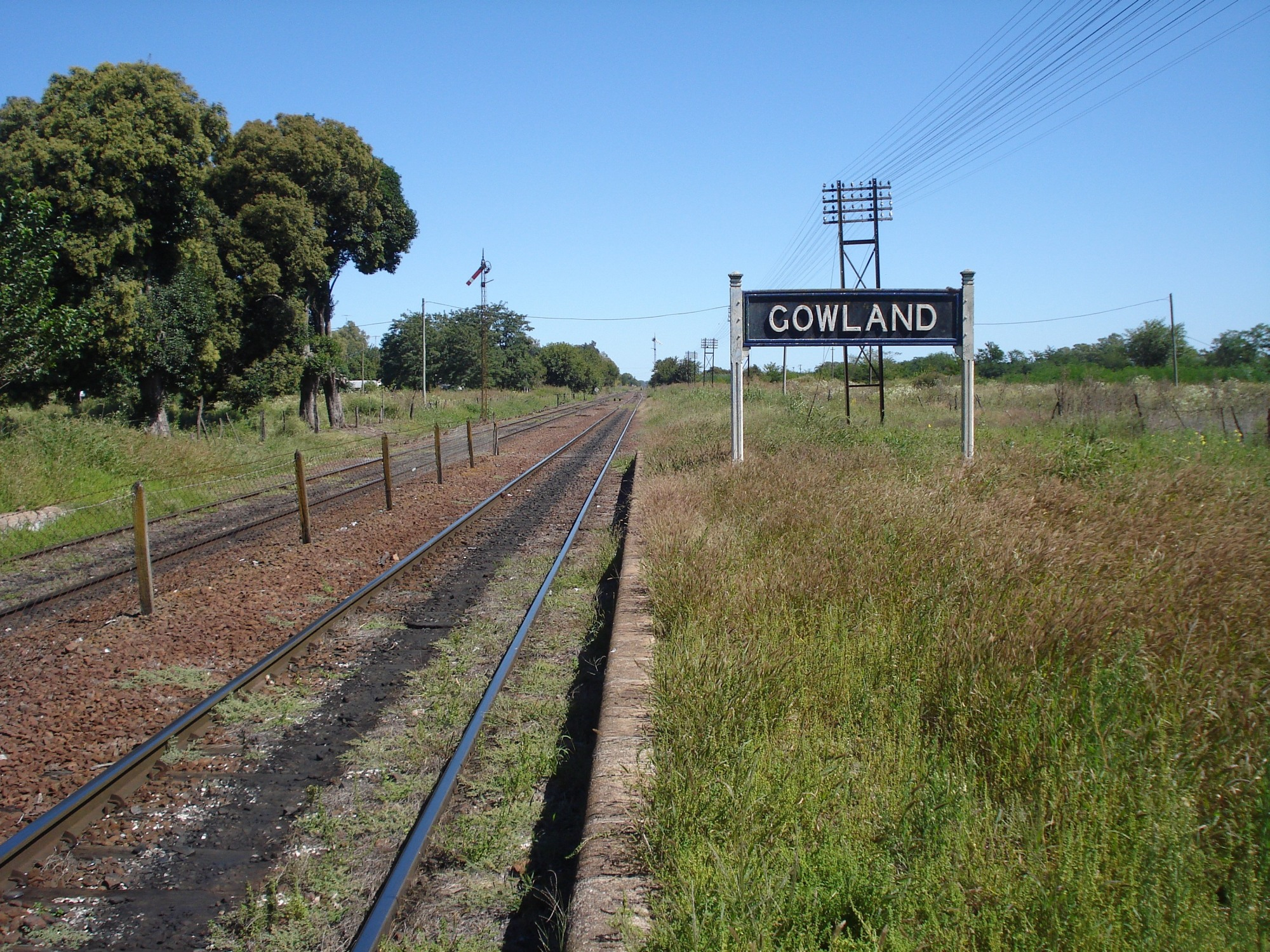
- Remnants of the town's rail entrance

- Location within Buenos Aires Province
- Coordinates: 34°39′S 59°21′W
- Country: Argentina
- Province: Buenos Aires
- Partidos: Mercedes
- Established: February 8, 1888
- Elevation: 33 m (108 ft)

Population (2001 Census)
  - Total: 1,288
- Time zone: UTC−3 (ART)
- CPA Base: B 6608
- Climate: Dfc

Gowland is a town located in the Mercedes Partido in the province of Buenos Aires, Argentina.

== History ==
Gowland was founded on February 8, 1888, when the Ferrocarril del Oeste, a railway company, established a train station in what would become the town.

== Population ==
According to INDEC, which collects population data for the country, the town had a population of 1,288 people as of the 2001 census.
