= Mercedes Cathedral (Argentina) =

Cathedral in argentina

Coordinates: 34.651389°S 59.431667°W

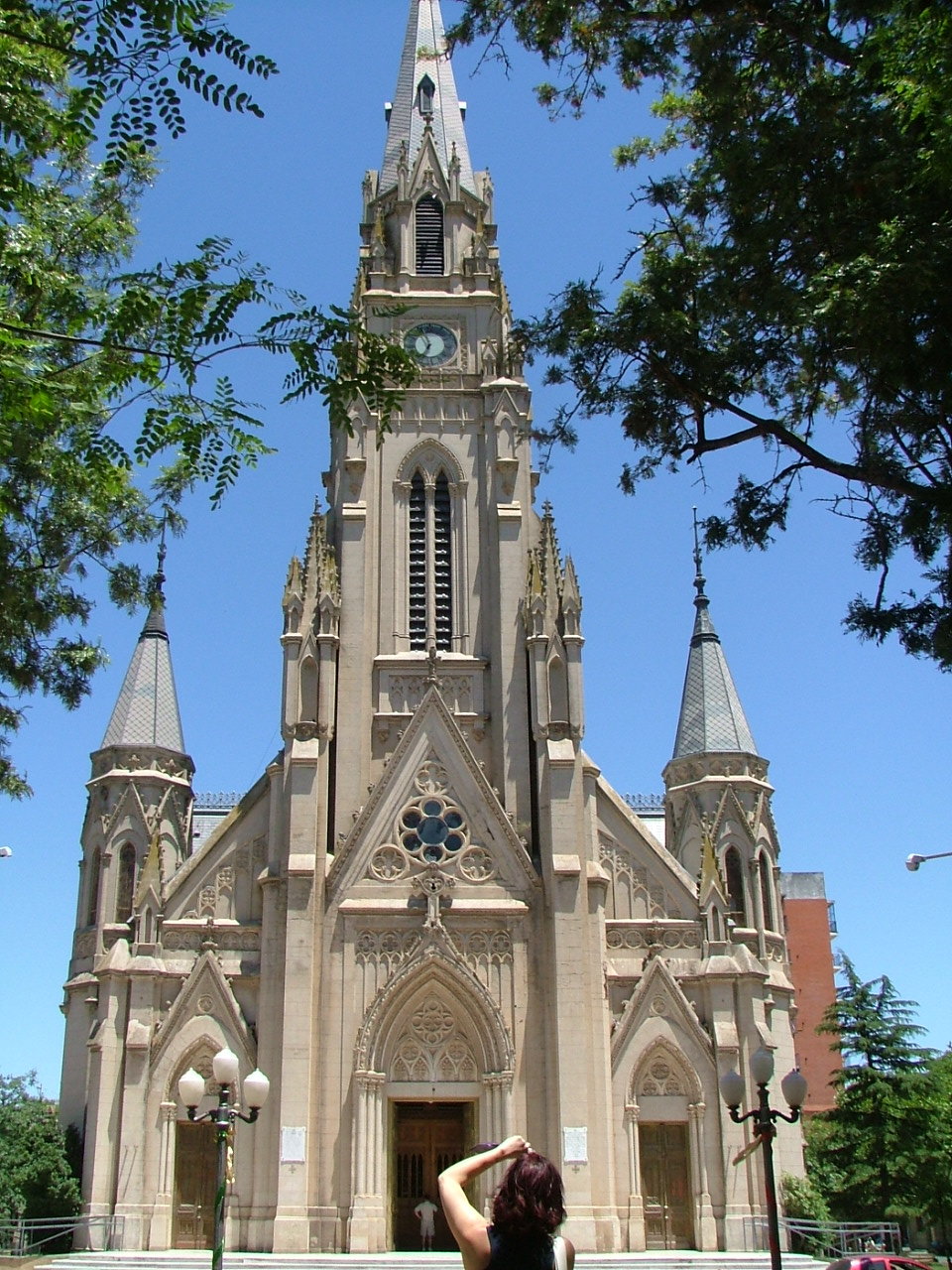
Catedral Basílica de Mercedes-Luján

Catedral Basílica de Mercedes-Luján ("Cathedral Basilica of Our Lady of Mercies") is a Catholic cathedral and minor basilica in Mercedes, Buenos Aires Province, Argentina. It is the seat of the Archdiocese of Mercedes-Luján. It was built in 1904 in Gothic Revival style. It contains the remains of Don Saturnino Unzué and Doña Inés Unzué Dorrego, its main benefactors. In 2010, the building was declared a National Historic Landmark. The cathedral is dedicated to Our Lady of Mercy.
