= Diocese of Avellaneda-Lanús =

Catholic ecclesiastical territory

Coordinates: 34.6630°S 58.3657°W

Diocese of Avellaneda-Lanús Dioecesis Avellanediensis-Lanusensis Diócesis de Avellaneda-Lanús

Catholic
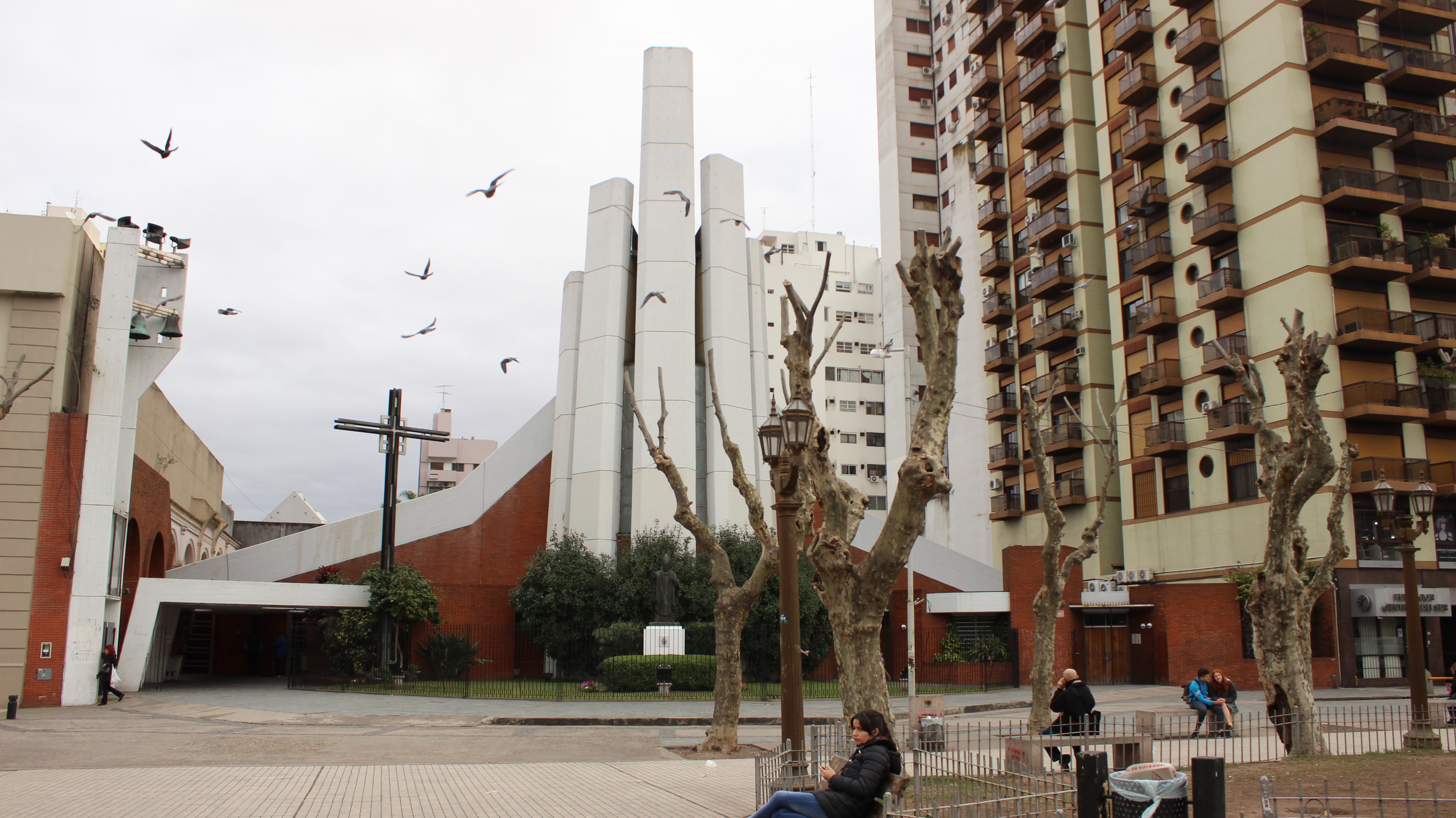
- Cathedral of the Assumption

Location
- Country: Argentina
- Ecclesiastical province: Buenos Aires
- Metropolitan: Buenos Aires

Statistics
- Area: 98 km^{2} (38 sq mi)
- Population: Total; Catholics: (as of 2012); 794,485; 635,588 (80%)
- Parishes: 50

Information
- Denomination: Roman Catholic
- Rite: Roman Rite
- Established: 10 April 1961 (65 years ago)
- Cathedral: Cathedral of the Assumption in Avellaneda
- Patron saint: St Teresa of Ávila; Assumption of Mary

Current leadership
- Pope: Leo XIV
- Bishop: Marcelo Julián Margni
- Metropolitan Archbishop: Jorge Ignacio García Cuerva
- Bishops emeritus: Rubén Oscar Frassia

The Latin Rite Catholic Diocese of Avellaneda-Lanús (erected 10 April 1961, as the Diocese of Avellaneda) is in Argentina and is a suffragan of the Archdiocese of Buenos Aires. It was renamed on 24 April 2001.

== Bishops ==
=== Ordinaries ===
- Emilio Antonio di Pasquo (1961–1962)
- Jerónimo José Podestá (1962–1967)
- Antonio Quarracino (1968–1985), appointed Archbishop of La Plata; later Cardinal
- Rubén Héctor di Monte (1986–2000), appointed Archbishop of Mercedes-Luján
- Rubén Oscar Frassia (2000–2020)
- Marcelo Julián Margni (2021–present)

=== Auxiliary bishop ===
- Rubén Héctor di Monte (1980-1986), subsequently appointed Bishop.

== Ministries ==
- Regional Council of Catholic Education (JUREC): Prebyster Maximiliano Bartel
- Youth Ministry: Prebyster Juan Carlos Molina
- Health Ministry: Deacon Juan Victorio Rolón
- Prisons Ministry: Prebyster Juan Carlos Jaudoszyn
- Addictions Ministry: Prebyster Osvaldo De Piero
- Social Ministry: Prebyster Maximiliano Bartel

== Territorial losses ==
Year	Along with	To form
1976	Archdiocese of La Plata	Diocese of Quilmes

== See also ==
- List of Catholic dioceses of Argentina

== External links and references ==
- "Diocese of Avellaneda-Lanús". Catholic-Hierarchy.
