= Antonio Caggiano =

Argentinian cardinal & Nazi sympathiser (1889-1979)

His Eminence Antonio Caggiano
- Cardinal, Archbishop of Buenos Aires
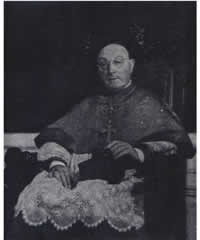
- Church: Catholic Church
- Archdiocese: Buenos Aires
- Appointed: 15 August 1959
- Installed: 25 October 1959
- Term ended: 22 April 1975
- Predecessor: Santiago Copello; Fermín Lafitte (ad interim)
- Successor: Juan Carlos Aramburu
- Other post: Cardinal-Priest of San Lorenzo in Panisperna

Orders
- Ordination: 23 March 1912
- Consecration: 17 March 1935 by Filippo Cortesi
- Created cardinal: 18 February 1946 by Pius XII
- Rank: Cardinal priest

Personal details
- Born: Antonio Caggiano; January 30, 1889 Coronda, Santa Fe Province, Argentina
- Died: October 23, 1979 (aged 90) Buenos Aires
- Buried: Buenos Aires Metropolitan Cathedral
- Denomination: Catholic
- Education: Seminary of Santa Fe

Styles of Antonio Caggiano
- Reference style: His Eminence
- Spoken style: Your Eminence
- Informal style: Cardinal
- See: Buenos Aires

Antonio Caggiano (30 January 1889 – 23 October 1979) was an archbishop and a cardinal of the Roman Catholic Church in Argentina. He played a part in helping Nazi sympathisers and war criminals escape prosecution in Europe by easing their passage to South America.

== Biography ==
Caggiano was born in Coronda, Santa Fe Province. He studied in the seminary of Santa Fe and became a priest there in 1908, at the age of 23. From 1913 to 1931 he taught at the seminary. In the 1920s he was sent to Rome by the Argentine episcopacy, together with three other priests, in order to study the organization of the Azione Cattolica (the Italian Catholic Action). The Argentine Catholic Action was founded in 1931 following this model.

Caggiano was appointed the first bishop of the newly erected Diocese of Rosario on 13 September 1934, for which he was consecrated on 14 March 1935. Pope Pius XII elevated him to Cardinal on 18 February 1946.

In his 2002 book The Real Odessa Uki Goñi showed that Argentine diplomats and intelligence officers had, on Perón's instructions, vigorously encouraged Nazi and Fascist war criminals to make their home in Argentina. Argentina's first move into Nazi smuggling was in January 1946, when Caggiano flew with Bishop Agustín Barrére to Rome where Caggiano was due to be created cardinal. While in Rome, the Argentine bishops met with French Cardinal Eugène Tisserant, where they passed on a message (recorded in Argentina's diplomatic archives) that "the Government of the Argentine Republic was willing to receive French persons, whose political attitude during the recent war would expose them, should they return to France, to harsh measures and private revenge". Over the spring of 1946 a number of French war criminals, fascists and Vichy officials made it from Italy to Argentina in the same way: they were issued passports by the Rome ICRC office; these were then stamped with Argentine tourist visas (the need for health certificates and return tickets was waived on Caggiano's recommendation). The first documented case of a French war criminal arriving in Buenos Aires was Emile Dewoitine, who was later sentenced in absentia to 20 years hard labour. He sailed first class on the same ship back with Cardinal Caggiano.

Caggiano participated in the 1958 and 1963 Papal conclaves, but his age prevented him from participating in the conclaves of 1978.

On 15 August 1959 he was appointed Archbishop of Buenos Aires. He was installed there on 25 October. On 14 December of that year he was also appointed head of the Military Ordinariate of Argentina.

Caggiano retired from the Archbishopric on 22 April 1975, and resigned from the Military Ordinariate on 7 July of the same year. He was the Archbishop Emeritus of Buenos Aires for four more years. He died in 1979, at the age of 90, and was buried in the Metropolitan Cathedral of Buenos Aires.

== Views ==
=== Le Marxisme-Léninisme ===
In 1961, Caggiano wrote a prologue for the Spanish translation by Juan Francisco Guevara (who later became a colonel) of Le Marxisme-léninisme, written by Jean Ousset, private secretary of monarchist intellectual Charles Maurras, and founder of the Cité catholique fundamentalist organization. The book states that Marxism–Leninism can be successfully combated only by a "profound faith, an unlimited obedience to the Holy Father, and a thorough knowledge of the Church's doctrines"; and Caggiano thanked the "men of La Ciudad Católica of Argentina" for publishing the book.

Along with Colonel Jean Gardes, French expert in psychological warfare, Ousset developed the new concept of "subversion". According to Horacio Verbitsky, an Argentine-Jewish member of the far-left Montoneros paramilitary, who does not say that it was expounded in the book, this concept "conceived a protean, quintessential enemy who, rather than being defined by his actions, was seen as a force trying to subvert Christian order, natural law or the Creator's plan." Verbitsky also says that the Cité catholique included members of the OAS terrorist group founded in Madrid during the Algerian War, and that the first branch outside France was created in 1958 in Argentina.

In this prologue, Caggiano explained that Marxism is born of "the negation of Christ and his Church put into practice by the Revolution" and spoke of a Marxist conspiracy to take over the world, for which it was necessary to "prepare for the decisive battle," although the enemy had not yet "taken up arms." Caggiano compared this vigilance to the one that preceded the 1571 Battle of Lepanto "to save Europe from domination by the Turks". Ousset's book included a list of the papal bulls condemning communism.

On this basis, Verbitsky, a member of the far-left Montoneros paramilitary, attributed to Caggiano support for "human rights violations", commenting: "As often happens in a continent that imports ideas, the doctrine of annihilation preceded that of the revolutionary uprising."

=== Counter-insurgency ===
In October 1961, Caggiano, who was then vicar of the Argentine Military Ordinariate, participated in the inauguration ceremony of the first course on counter-revolutionary warfare in the Higher Military College at the side of President Arturo Frondizi, who within a few months was ousted, accused, Verbitsky says, of being too tolerant towards communism.

Verbitsky says that Bishop Victorio Bonamín, Caggiano's associate in the military vicariate general, was one of the instructors in the course, but not Caggiano himself. He also says that in the course of counter-insurgency classes cadets at the Navy Mechanics School were shown the film The Battle of Algiers (1966), made by Italian communist director Gillo Pontecorvo. The film, which was censored in France, showed the methods used by the French colonial army in Algeria, including the systemic use of torture. The naval chaplain (again, not Caggiano) introduced the film and added a commentary from the religious point of view, reportedly justifying the use of torture as a weapon.

== See also ==
- Marie-Monique Robin
- Dirty War

Catholic Church titles
Preceded by none	Bishop of Rosario; 1934–1959	Succeeded by Silvino Martínez
Preceded by Fermín Emilio Lafitte	Archbishop of Buenos Aires; 1959–1975	Succeeded by Juan Carlos Aramburu
Preceded by Josef Frings	Cardinal Protopriest; 1978–1979	Succeeded by Carlos Vasconcellos
Records
Preceded by Alberto di Jorio	Oldest living Member of the Sacred College; 5 September – 23 October 1979	Succeeded by Carlos Vascocellos
