= Laurie Serafini =

Australian rules footballer

Personal information
- Full name: Lorenzo Peter Serafini
- Born: 1 November 1958 (age 68)
- Original team: Assumption College
- Debut: 9 July 1977, Fitzroy vs. Footscray, at Junction Oval
- Height: 191 cm (6 ft 3 in)
- Weight: 85 kg (13 st 5 lb)

Playing career^{1}
Years	Club	Games (Goals)
1977–1985	Fitzroy	146 (9)
- ^{1} Playing statistics correct to the end of 1985.

Lorenzo 'Laurie' Serafini (born 1 November 1958) is a former Australian rules footballer who played with Fitzroy in the VFL between the late 1970s and middle 1980s, having been recruited from Assumption College, Kilmore and the PDJFA. He is the younger brother of Renato Serafini, who also played for Fitzroy in the 1970s. From an Italian background, his parents, Carlo and Adelina hailed from Marostica, in the Veneto region of Italy.

== Playing career ==
Serafini started as a full forward, kicking a goal with his first kick in League football, and a total of four on debut. However, in his second season Serafini was moved onto the wing and then half back flank, and he later cemented the fullback spot when Harvey Merrigan retired. He was a speedy, dashing defender who created many attacking moves for a Fitzroy team that was emerging from eighteen seasons out of the finals since 1961. In 1983 he alternated between half back flank and full back; and was Fitzroy's top vote getter in the 1983 Brownlow Medal count. He was club vice captain 1981–1982, and a three time Victorian representative.

Serafini's career was derailed when a hamstring injury originating from the 1983 State of Origin game at Football Park kept him out of the 1983 finals. This injury was sufficiently exacerbated at training during September 1983 that it would prevent him playing for the first six games of 1984. Then a damaged shoulder ligament and poor form saw him dropped from the senior side after the fourteenth round, although he was listed as a possible interchange player for the elimination final. Serafini regained a permanent senior berth in the second round of 1985, but another strained hamstring would end his season after the fifteenth round. Although he would return to the reserves in mid-1986, Laurie Serafini never played a single senior game after 1985, though he remained on the Lions' playing list as late as 1988.

== Post-playing ==
Serafini remained involved in football after injuries caused his premature retirement, writing part time for the newly launched Sunday Age and reporting on the famous 1989 Grand Final. In 1998, he became a director at the Brisbane Lions, and at the end of a disastrous season, Serafini assisted CEO Andrew Ireland to interview Leigh Matthews as the club's next coach, leading to the 2001, 2002 and 2003 Brisbane Lions Premierships. He remained on the Board for 14 years, being the last member associated with Fitzroy when he stepped down in 2010.

In his later years on the Lion board Serafini would recommend CEOs to other struggling clubs, including Carlton and Melbourne.
