= Renato Serafini =

Australian rules footballer

Personal information
- Full name: Renato William Serafini
- Born: 18 March 1953 (age 73)
- Original team: Assumption College
- Height: 189 cm (6 ft 2 in)
- Weight: 87 kg (192 lb)

Playing career^{1}
Years	Club	Games (Goals)
1971–1977	Fitzroy	81 (117)
1977–1978	Carlton	7 (6)
Total		88 (123)
- ^{1} Playing statistics correct to the end of 1978.

Renato Serafini (born 18 March 1953) is a former Australian rules footballer who played with Fitzroy and Carlton in the VFL during the 1970s. Of Italian background, his parents, Carlo and Adelina arrived in Australia in 1952 from Marostica, a small town in the Veneto region of Italy.

Serafini played mostly as a full-forward and topped Fitzroy's goalkicking in 1975 after kicking 34 goals in the season. Like his younger brother Laurie, he was recruited to Fitzroy from Assumption College. He crossed to Carlton in 1977 and spent two seasons with the Blues, before joining Frankston in 1979, the club's first season in the Victorian Football Association top division. Serafini was the Division 1 leading goalkicker in the 1979 home-and-away season with 95 goals, but was passed in the finals to finish third overall. He kicked 271 goals in 52 games for Frankston from 1979 until 1981. Seeking a pay rise, he shifted to Coburg during 1982.
