= Mercedes Partido =

Mercedes Partido de Mercedes
- Department
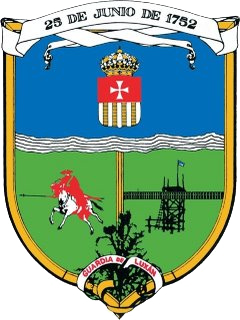
- Coat of arms Logo

- location of Mercedes Partido in Buenos Aires Province
- Coordinates: 34°40′S 59°26′W
- Country: Argentina
- Established: June 25, 1752
- Seat: Mercedes

Government
  - Intendant: Juan Ignacio Ustarroz (PJ)

Area
  - Total: 1,050 km^{2} (410 sq mi)

Population
  - Total: 62,151
  - Density: 59.2/km^{2} (153/sq mi)
- Demonym: mercedina/o
- Postal Code: B6600
- IFAM: BUE081
- Area Code: 02324
- Website: nw.mercedes.gob.ar

Mercedes Partido is a partido in the eastern part of Buenos Aires Province in Argentina.

The provincial subdivision has a population of about 62,000 inhabitants in an area of 1,050 km^{2} (405 sq mi), and its capital city is Mercedes, 100 km (62 mi) from Buenos Aires.

== Settlements ==
- Agote
- Altamira
- García
- Goldney
- Gowland
- La Verde
- Mercedes
- San Jacinto
- Tomás Jofré

== Population growth ==
- 1980: 51,207
- 1991: 55,685
- 2001: 59,870
- 2002: 60,674
- 2003: 61,034
- 2004: 61,395
- 2005: 61,704
- 2006: 62,151

== Geography ==
Mercedes Partido is situated in the Undulated Pampa (Pampa Ondulada), one of the subregions of the Pampas. It owes its name to a series of undulations, or the way the terrain descends gradually to the banks of the Paraná River. It extends north of the Salado River in Buenos Aires Province, from Samborombón Bay to the northeast, to the provinces of Córdoba and Santa Fe.

== Climate ==
As in the rest of the Undulated Pampa, Mercedes's climate is humid-temperate, characterized by:

- Four distinct seasons.
- The moderating influence on temperatures by being near to the Atlantic Ocean.
- The free circulation of Atlantic humid winds, due to the flat terrain.

Average temperature and rainfall in the city of Mercedes for the 1983 - 2000 period:

- January: 23 °C (73 °F) - 94 mm (3.70 in)
- February: 21 °C (70 °F) - 111 mm (4.37 in)
- March: 20 °C (68 °F) - 107 mm (4.21 in)
- April: 15 °C (59 °F) - 128 mm (5.04 in)
- May: 12 °C (54 °F) - 72 mm (2.83 in)
- June: 9 °C (48 °F) - 39 mm (1.54 in)
- July: 8 °C (46 °F) - 35 mm (1.38 in)
- August: 10 °C (50 °F) - 41 mm (1.61 in)
- September: 12 °C (54 °F) - 43 mm (1.69 in)
- October: 15 °C (59 °F) - 131 mm (5.16 in)
- November: 18 °C (64 °F) - 119 mm (4.69 in)
- December: 21 °C (70 °F) - 96 mm (3.78 in)
- Summer: 21 °C (70 °F) - 312 mm (12.28 in)
- Fall: 12 °C (54 °F) - 239 mm (9.41 in)
- Winter: 10 °C (50 °F) - 119 mm (4.69 in)
- Spring: 18 °C (64 °F) - 346 mm (13.62 in)
- Annual: 15 °C (59 °F) - 1,016 mm (40 in)
