= Rubén Héctor di Monte =

Roman Catholic archbishop (1932–2016)

- Archbishop of Mercedes-Luján
- Church: Catholic Church
- Archdiocese: Archdiocese of Mercedes-Luján
- In office: 7 March 2000 – 27 December 2007
- Predecessor: Emilio Ogñénovich
- Successor: Agustín Roberto Radrizzani
- Previous posts: Bishop of Avellaneda (1986-2000); Titular Bishop of Iomnium (1980-1986); Auxiliary Bishop of Avellaneda (1980-1986)

Orders
- Ordination: 5 December 1954
- Consecration: 16 August 1980 by Antonio Quarracino

Personal details
- Born: 12 April 1932 Luján, Buenos Aires Province, Argentina
- Died: 18 April 2016 (aged 84)

Rubén Héctor di Monte (12 April 1932 – 18 April 2016) was a Roman Catholic archbishop.

Ordained to the priesthood in 1954, di Monte was named auxiliary bishop of the Roman Catholic Diocese of Avellaneda, Argentina in 1986. From 1988 until 2000, di Monte served as bishop of Avellaneda. From 2000 until 2007, di Monti served as archbishop of the Roman Catholic Archdiocese of Mercedes-Luján.
