= Juan Carlos Aramburu =

Argentine cardinal (1912–2004)

His Eminence Juan Carlos Aramburu
- Cardinal, Archbishop of Buenos Aires
- Cardinal Aramburu with the Minister of Interior during the National Reorganization Process, General Llamil Restón
- Archdiocese: Buenos Aires
- Appointed: June 14, 1967 (Coadjutor)
- Installed: April 22, 1975
- Term ended: July 10, 1990
- Predecessor: Antonio Caggiano
- Successor: Antonio Quarracino
- Other posts: Cardinal priest of San Giovanni dei Fiorentini; Ordinary of the Ordinariate for the Faithful of the Eastern Rites in Argentina (1975‍–‍1990)

Orders
- Ordination: October 28, 1934
- Consecration: December 15, 1946 by Fermín Emilio Lafitte
- Created cardinal: May 24, 1976 by Paul VI
- Rank: Cardinal priest

Personal details
- Born: Juan Carlos Aramburu; February 11, 1912 Reducción, Córdoba Province, Argentina
- Died: November 18, 2004 (aged 92) Buenos Aires, Argentina
- Buried: Buenos Aires Metropolitan Cathedral
- Denomination: Roman Catholic Church
- Education: Pontifical Gregorian University
- Coat of arms: Juan Carlos Aramburu's coat of arms

Styles of Juan Carlos Aramburu
- Reference style: His Eminence
- Spoken style: Your Eminence
- Informal style: Cardinal
- See: Buenos Aires

Juan Carlos Aramburu (February 11, 1912 – November 18, 2004) was the Roman Catholic archbishop of Buenos Aires, Argentina, from 1975 to 1990, and was named to the College of Cardinals by Pope Paul VI in 1976.

== Biography ==
Aramburu was born in rural Reducción, in the Province of Córdoba, Argentina. He was ordained a priest in 1934 and became a bishop in 1946, serving successively as auxiliary bishop, diocesan bishop (from 1953), and first archbishop (from 1957) of Tucumán. He created ten new parishes and built chapels in this diocese, as well as a House of Spiritual Exercises. His intense pastoral work included giving the Confirmation to more than 1,000 people in one day.

In 1967 he was named coadjutor archbishop of Buenos Aires, and on April 22, 1975, he was installed as archbishop, succeeding Antonio Caggiano. He was elevated to cardinal one year later, on May 24, 1976.

Aramburu was the second youngest bishop in the history of the Argentine Church, and served for 70 years of priesthood, during which he consecrated ten bishops. At his death, he was the senior bishop by date of consecration in the entire Catholic Church. Active in retirement, he suffered a fatal cardiac failure as he prepared to hear confessions at the Shrine of San Cayetano.

== Collaboration with National Reorganization Process ==
The year of Aramburu's elevation to cardinal coincided with the beginning of the National Reorganization Process. The Mothers of the Plaza de Mayo, a group looking for information on their children who suffered forced disappearance, wrote to top members of the ecclesiastical hierarchy for help, including Aramburu, but it did not get any response. Also, Aramburu did not denounce the murder of Bishop Enrique Angelelli, conducted by a military task force and disguised as a road accident; instead, he claimed that there was no evidence of it being a crime.

In 1982, during a trip to Italy, Aramburu was interviewed by the Roman newspaper Il Messaggero and replied to a question about forced disappearances by saying: "I don't understand how this question of guerrillas and terrorism has come up again; it's been over for a long time." On the issue of common graves with unidentified bodies being discovered, he claimed: "In Argentina there are no common graves. ... Everything was recorded in the regular fashion in the books. The common graves belong to people who died without the authorities being able to identify them. Disappeared? Let's not confuse things. You know that there are 'disappeared people' who live quietly in Europe."

In 2002, an organization composed of children of disappeared people organized a protest to accuse Aramburu of collaborationism with the National Reorganization Process. The Argentine Episcopal Conference released a document in defense of Aramburu. Rubén Capitanio, a priest, sent a critical letter to the Conference where he mentioned, among other things, that Aramburu had given Holy Communion to people "that [he] knew were responsible of horrible public crimes" and that he had overlooked the human rights abuses at the Navy Mechanics School, within his jurisdiction.

Catholic Church titles
Preceded by Antonio Caggiano	Archbishop of Buenos Aires; 1975–1990	Succeeded by Antonio Quarracino
