= Diocese of Nueve de Julio =

Catholic ecclesiastical territory

Diocese of Nueve de Julio Dioecesis Sancti Dominici Novem Iulii Diócesis de Nueve de Julio

Catholic

Location
- Country: Argentina
- Ecclesiastical province: Mercedes-Luján

Statistics
- Area: 56,743 km^{2} (21,909 sq mi)
- Population: Total; Catholics: (as of 2004); 382,196; 343,977 (90%)
- Parishes: 38

Information
- Denomination: Roman Catholic
- Rite: Roman Rite
- Established: 11 February 1957 (69 years ago)
- Cathedral: Cathedral of St Dominic of Guzman in Nueve de Julio
- Patron saint: Saint Dominic; Our Lady of Fátima

Current leadership
- Pope: Leo XIV
- Bishop: Ariel Edgardo Torrado Mosconi
- Metropolitan Archbishop: Jorge Eduardo Scheinig
- Bishops emeritus: Martín de Elizalde

Map
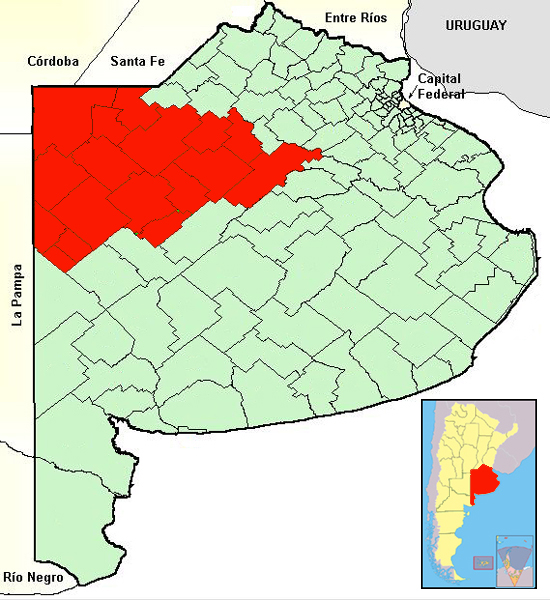

Website
- Website of the Diocese

The Roman Catholic Diocese of Nueve de Julio (Latin: Dioecesis Sancti Dominici Novem Iulii) is a Catholic diocese located in the city of Nueve de Julio, Buenos Aires Province. It is in the ecclesiastical province of Mercedes-Luján in Argentina, having had change of metropolitan from La Plata in 2019.

== History ==
On 11 February 1957, Pope Pius XII established the Diocese of Neuve de Julio from the Diocese of Azul and the Diocese of Mercedes.

== Bishops ==
=== Ordinaries ===
- Agustin Adolfo Herrera (1957–1961), appointed Coadjutor Bishop of Jujuy
- Antonio Quarracino (1962–1968), appointed Coadjutor Bishop of Jujuy; future Cardinal
- Alejo Benedicto Gilligan (1969–1991)
- Jose Vittorio Tommasi (1991–1998)
- Martin de Elizalde, O.S.B. (1999–2015)
- Ariel Edgardo Torrado Mosconi (2015–Present)

=== Coadjutor bishop ===
- Ariel Edgardo Torrado Mosconi (2015)
