= Mercedes, Buenos Aires =

Mercedes
- City
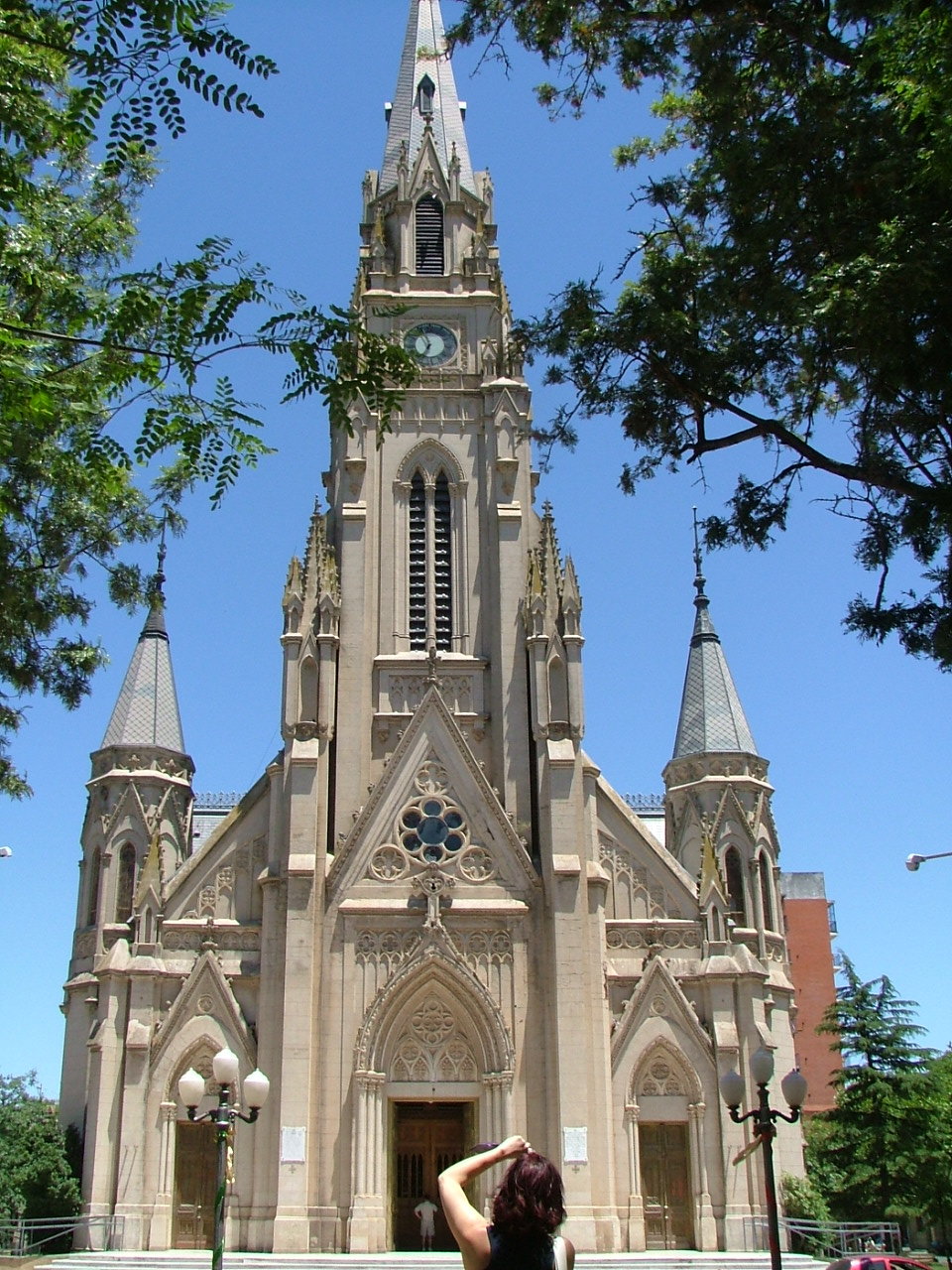
- Catedral Basílica de Mercedes-Luján, built in 1904, a National Historic Monument since 2010

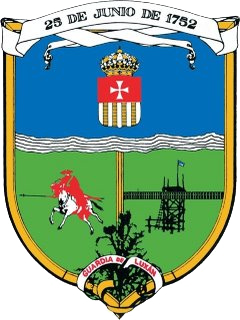
- Coat of arms

- Location in Buenos Aires Province
- Coordinates: 34°39′S 59°26′W
- Country: Argentina
- Province: Buenos Aires
- Partido: Mercedes
- Founded: June 25, 1752; 274 years ago
- Elevation: 38 m (125 ft)

Population (2010 census)
  - Total: 56,116
- CPA Base: B 6600
- Area code: +54 02324

Mercedes (Spanish pronunciation: [meɾˈseðes]) is a city in Buenos Aires Province, Argentina. It is located 100 km (62 miles) west from Buenos Aires and 30 km (18 miles) southwest of Luján. It is the administrative headquarters for the district (partido) of Mercedes as well as of the judicial district. The Catedral Basílica de Mercedes-Luján, located in the city, is the seat of the Roman Catholic Archdiocese of Mercedes-Luján.

Mercedes has a population of 51,967 people (51,5% women, 48,5% men) as per the 2001 census [INDEC].

== History ==
Mercedes was first established as a fortress against native indigenous attacks. Its original name was "La Guardia de Luján" and it was one of several fortress built in the borders of Buenos Aires to protect this city and gather the people living in the county near.

It became a town on 25 June 1752 when founded by José de Zárate during a military campaign known as "La Valerosa". In 1777 viceroy Pedro de Cevallos proposed moving the town, but actually it was moved to its present location by viceroy Juan José de Vértiz on 8 May 1779. When moved its name was changed to "Nuestra Señora de las Mercedes".

Mercedes is one of the few towns in Argentina in which three different railways meet, thus been connected with large commercial areas as Buenos Aires as well as the Pacific Ocean, the Andes range and the pampas plains. This was a powerful reason during the 19th century for proposing the city as the capital of Buenos Aires Province. Finally La Plata became capital, but Mercedes became known as the "West Pearl".

In 1812 the Mercedes Partido was established because of the city's increasing population and commercial activities. The first municipal government was elected in 1856. Then-governor of Buenos Aires, Mariano Saavedra, officially named it "Ciudad de Mercedes" in 1865, the same year that railway came to Mercedes for the first time.

== Churches ==
The most important churches in the city are:

- Our Lady of Mercedes Cathedral located on San Martín square, also the location of the italianate "Palacio Municipal" (city hall) and numerous cafés and restaurants. A library founded by President Domingo Faustino Sarmiento is located a few streets away. Built in neogothic style and inaugurated on April 16, 1921, in 1934 received "cathedral" status by Pope bull. The Cathedral was declared National Monument of Argentina by a decree signed by president Cristina Fernández in 2010.
- St. Patrick's Church: Inaugurated on March 17, 1932 and remodeled in 2003, it has 2,500 m2 and a large number of vitraux, a figure representing St. Patrick among them. This church also has the largest pipe organ in South America, with 4,700 tubes. It was directly brought from Germany. A group of gargoyles (18 in total) decorate the exterior of the church.
- St. Luis Gonzaga Church: designated by architect Pedro Benoit (Pierre Benoît's son), is the oldest in the city, having been inaugurated as a chapel in 1891, after twelve years of construction. The chapel received "church" status in December 1941.

== Transport ==
=== Railway ===
Mercedes has three railway stations, with two of them still active: Mercedes (Sarmiento) is terminus of the Sarmiento Line diesel branch from Moreno and Mercedes (San Martín) is part of the San Martín Railway line where long-distance services are operated by state-owned companies Trenes Argentinos and Ferrobaires to Rufino and Alberdi respectively. The station was originally built by the Buenos Aires and Pacific Railway. Mercedes Sarmiento and San Martín are also located few meters to one another.

The third station is Mercedes (Belgrano), originally built by French-owned Compañía General and inactive since the 1970s. That station is far from the city's commercial area.

Railway stations with the name "Mercedes" are:

Name	Former company	Line	Status	Current operator
Mercedes	BA Western	Sarmiento	Active	Trenes Argentinos
Mercedes Pacífico	BA & Pacific	San Martín	Active	Trenes Argentinos, Ferrobaires
Mercedes	Compañía General	Belgrano	Closed (1977) ^{1}	—

Notes:

- ^{1} The building is currently occupied by several non-profit associations.

=== Road ===
Mercedes can be reached from the city of Buenos Aires by the "Acceso Oeste" and then by National Route 5 until km. 100. From the city of Lobos by Provincial Route 41 to the north (80-km length) and from Chivilcoy by Route 5 to the northwest. The city can also be reached from San Antonio de Areco after completing 50 km-length (31 km) by Provincial Route 41.

Mercedes has a bus terminal, located near the Mercedes (Sarmiento) railway station.

== Geography ==
=== Location ===
The city of Mercedes is 34° 39'south latitude and 59° 25' west longitude, along the Luján River. It is 35 km (30 min by car) from the city of Luján, one of the most important religious center and pilgrimage of Argentina; 100 km (62 mi) from Buenos Aires and, 152 km (94 mi) from La Plata, capital of the province.

=== Climate ===
The climate of this region is the Mesopotamian type temperate humid with an annual average of 16 °C (60.8 °F). The winter is mild with average temperatures of 9 °C (48.2 °F), while the summer is mild with an average temperature of 23 °C (73.4 °F).

== Popular culture ==
On the outskirts of Mercedes there is an old pulpería or rural bar and store, institutions which enjoy mythical status in gaucho culture. Known as "lo de Cacho" (Cacho's), it claims to be the last pulpería of the Pampas and retains the atmosphere of 1850, the year it opened. There is an original wanted poster for the outlaw Juan Moreira and reminders of gauchos, their culture and knife fights.

There is an old war memorial called "La Cruz de Palo". It is a wooden cross remembering where the last of the native attacks to Mercedes took place on 27 October 1823.

Mercedes is known for its peaches and salami, been the venue for the National Peach Fair (Fiesta Nacional del Durazno) as well as the National Salami Fair (Fiesta Nacional del Salame Quintero). Both fairs have their own queen elected each year.

== Miscellanea ==
Mercedes has been the birthplace of several football players (Lucas Biglia), musicians, writers and journalists. Nevertheless, it is most known as the town where president Héctor José Cámpora was born as well as the military dictator and president Jorge Rafael Videla.

The city is organized into hundred-meters-long square blocks (as a Roman castra). The streets are numbered with even numbers from South to North and with odd numbers from East to West, making it easier to orient, find addresses and calculate distances along the city.

== Gallery ==
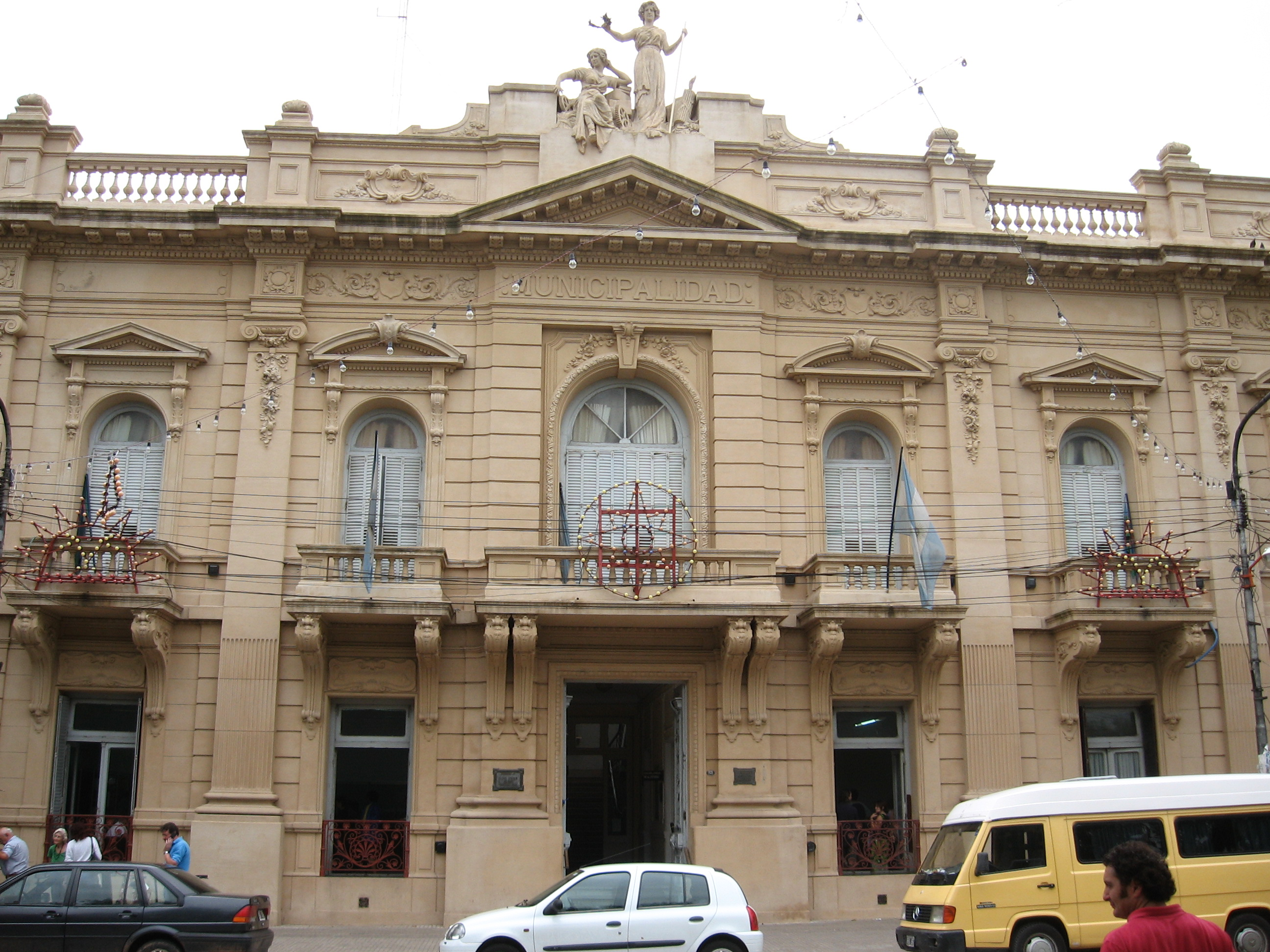
Municipal building

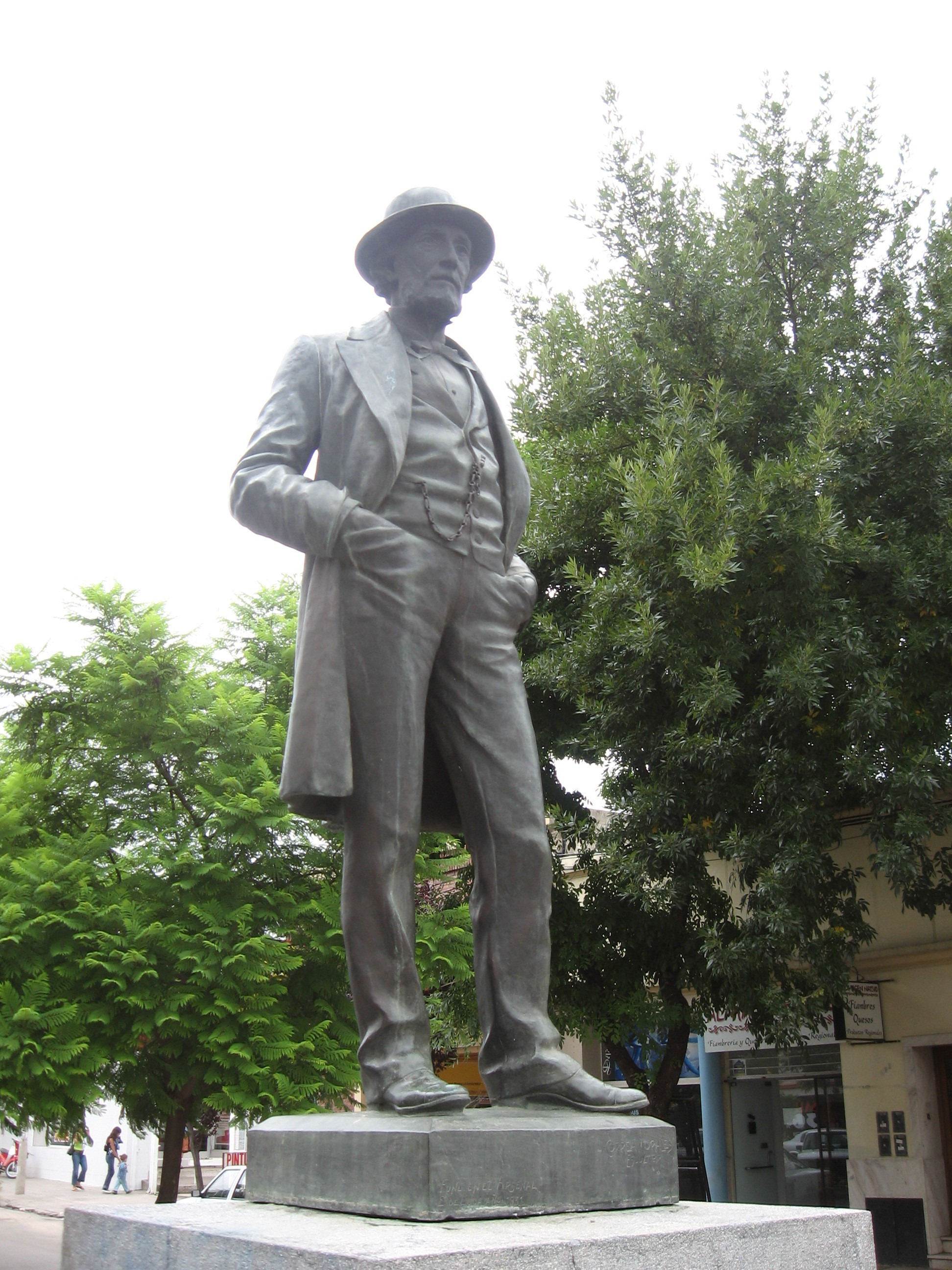
Statue of Bartolomé Mitre

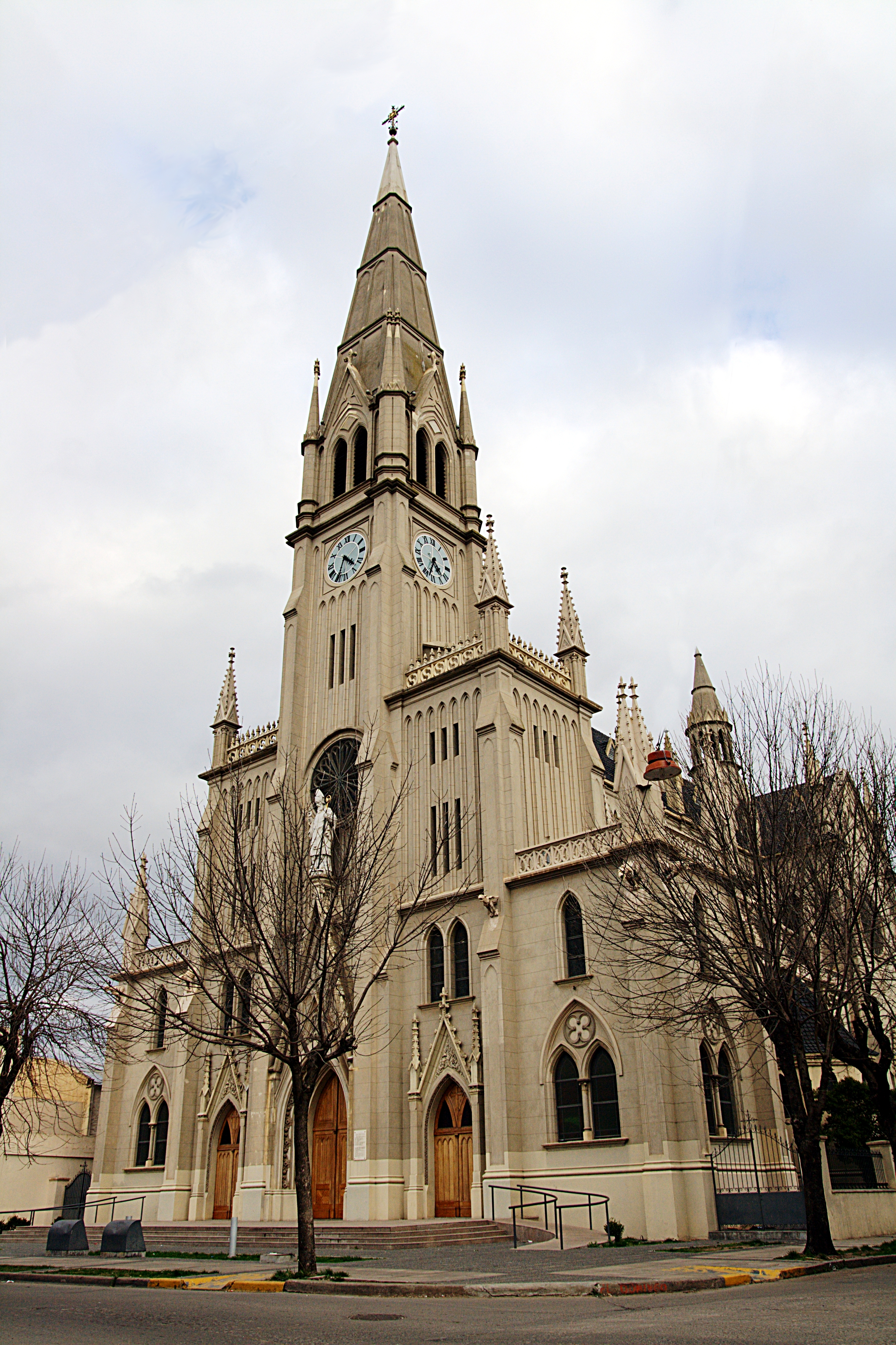
Church of Saint Patrick

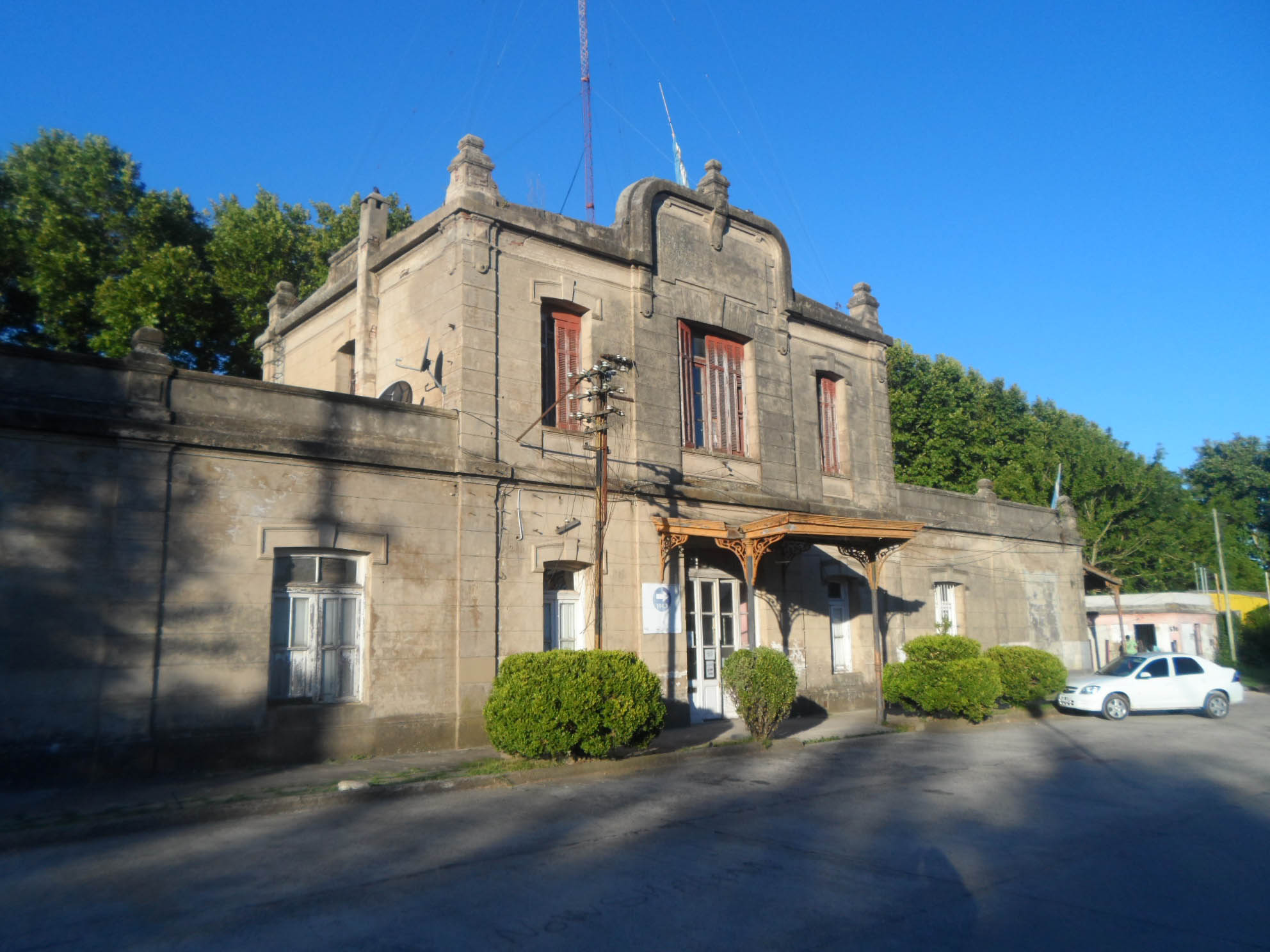
Belgrano Railway train station

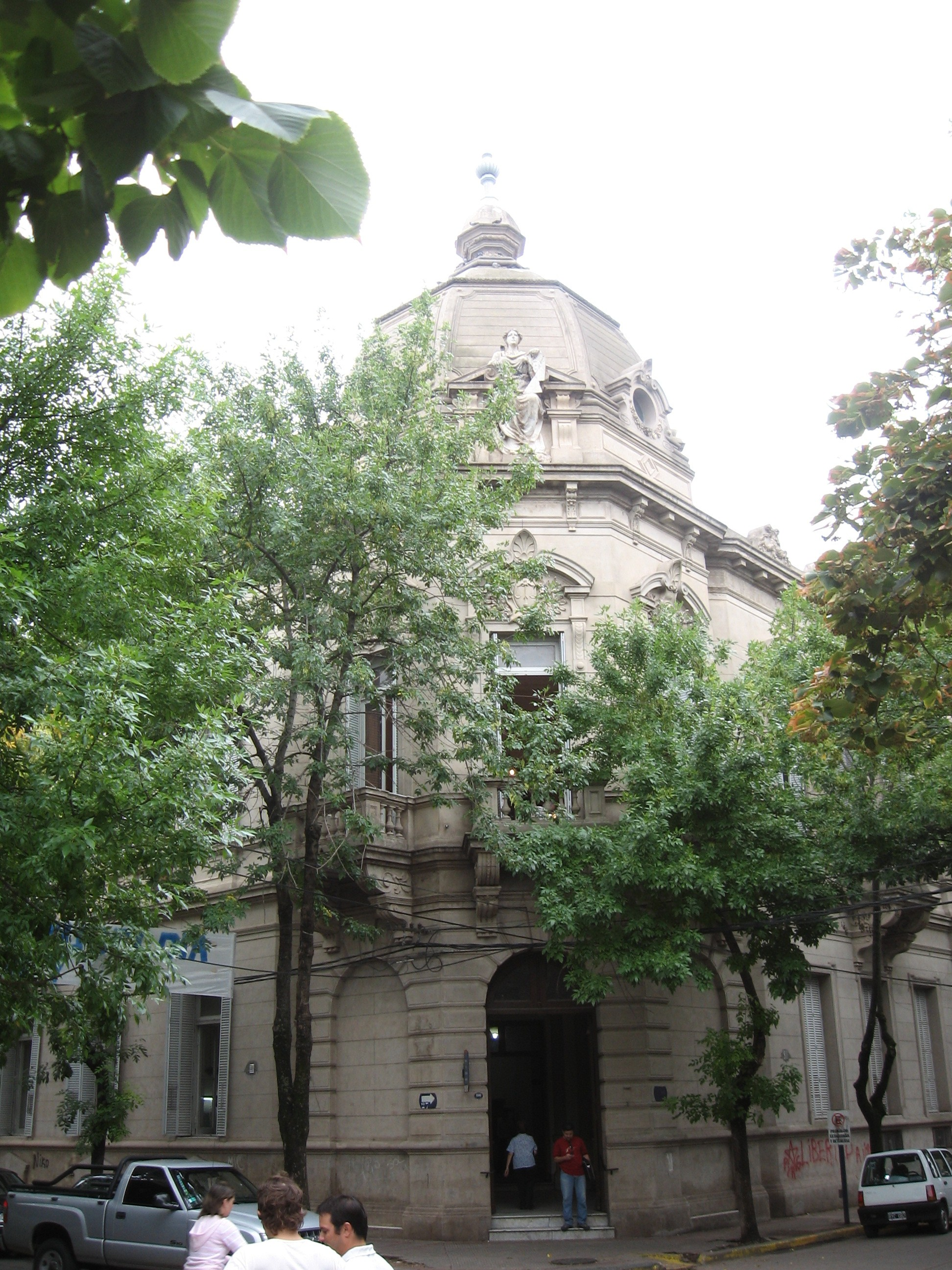
Palace of Justice

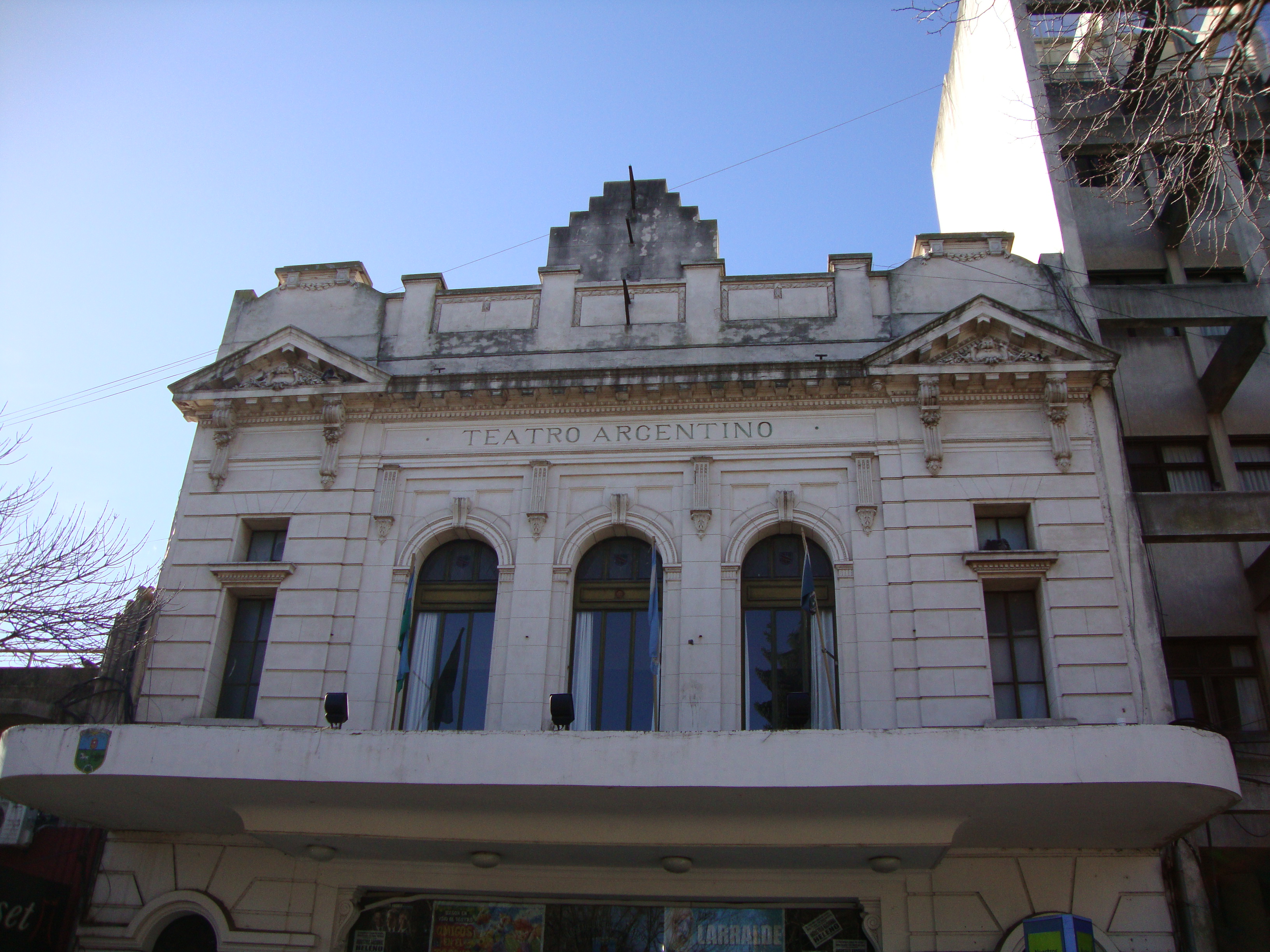
Argentine Theatre
