= Antonio Quarracino =

Argentine Catholic prelate, cardinal (1923–1998)

His Eminence Antonio Quarracino
- Cardinal; Archbishop of Buenos Aires
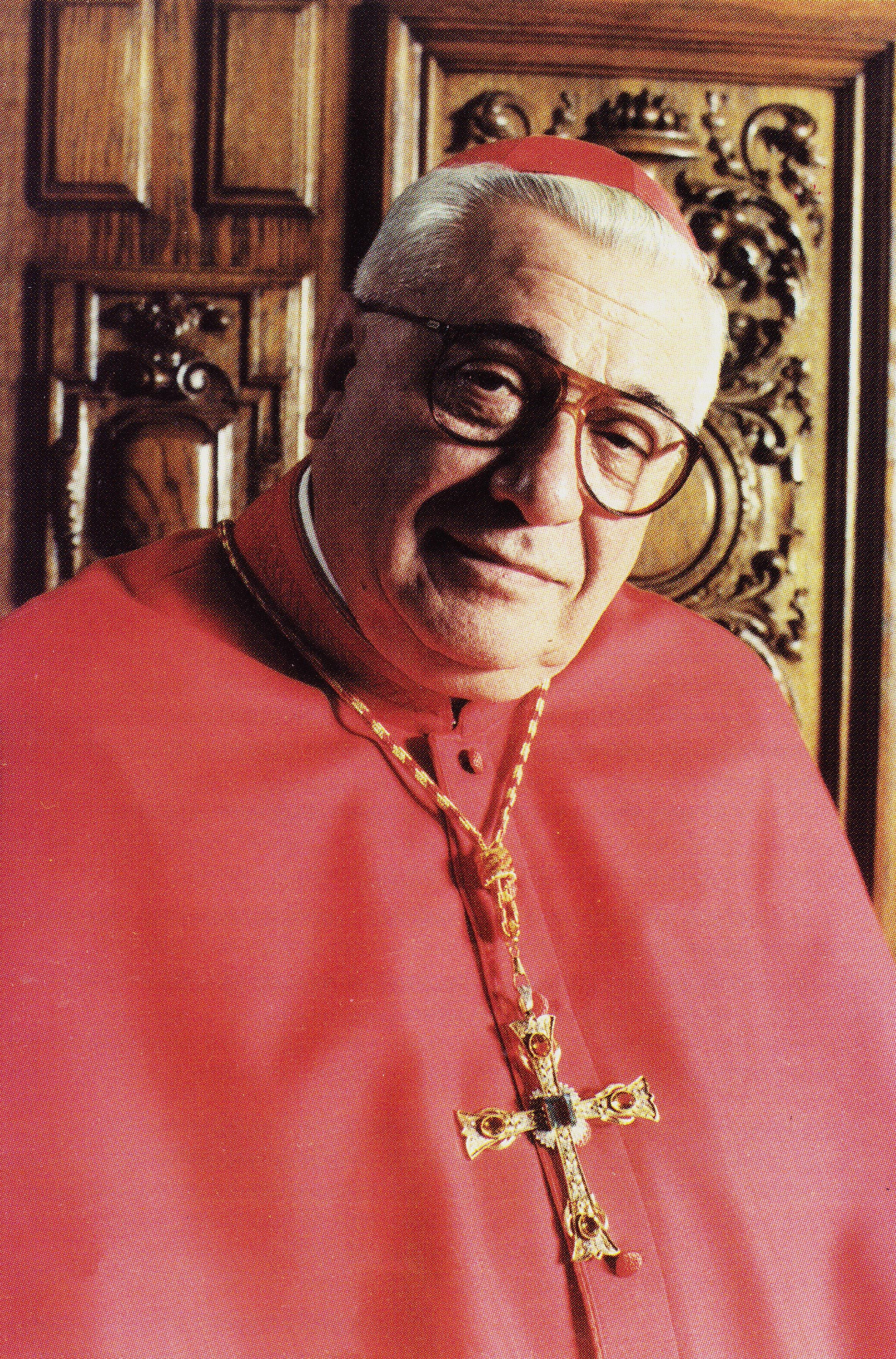
- Quarracino in 1991
- Church: Catholic
- Archdiocese: Buenos Aires
- Appointed: 10 July 1990
- Installed: 22 November 1990
- Term ended: 28 February 1998
- Predecessor: Juan Carlos Aramburu
- Successor: Jorge Mario Bergoglio
- Other posts: Cardinal-Priest of Santa Maria della Salute a Primavalle (1991‍–‍1998); Ordinary of the Ordinariate for the Faithful of the Eastern Rites in Argentina (1990‍–‍1998)
- Previous posts: Bishop of Nueve de Julio (1962‍–‍1968); Bishop of Avellaneda (1968‍–‍1985); Secretary General of the Latin American Episcopal Council (1979‍–‍1983); President of the Latin American Episcopal Council (1983‍–‍1987); Archbishop of La Plata (1985‍–‍1990); President of the Argentine Episcopal Conference (1990‍–‍1996)

Orders
- Ordination: 22 December 1945 by Anunciado Serafini
- Consecration: 8 April 1962 by Anunciado Serafini
- Created cardinal: 28 June 1991 by Pope John Paul II
- Rank: Cardinal-Priest

Personal details
- Born: Antonio Quarracino; 8 August 1923 Pollica, Salerno, Kingdom of Italy
- Died: 28 February 1998 (aged 74) Buenos Aires, Argentina
- Buried: Buenos Aires Metropolitan Cathedral
- Education: San José Seminary
- Motto: Ipsi gloria (Latin for 'To Him be the glory')
- Coat of arms: Antonio Quarracino's coat of arms

Styles of Antonio Quarracino
- Informal style: Cardinal
- See: Buenos Aires

Ordination history of Antonio Quarracino
History
Priestly ordination
- Date: 22 December 1945
Episcopal consecration
- Principal consecrator: Anunciado Serafini
- Co-consecrators: Adolfo Servando Tortolo, Raúl Francisco Primatesta
- Date: 8 April 1962
Cardinalate
- Elevated by: Pope John Paul II
- Date: 28 June 1991
Episcopal succession
Bishops consecrated by Antonio Quarracino as principal consecrator
- Alejo Benedicto Gilligan: 4 October 1969
- Rubén Héctor di Monte: 16 August 1980
- Norberto Eugenio Conrado Martina: 9 December 1990
- Héctor Rubén Aguer: 4 April 1992
- Rubén Oscar Frassia: 4 April 1992
- Jorge Mario Bergoglio: 27 June 1992
- Raúl Omar Rossi: 27 June 1992
- Pedro Luis Ronchino: 19 March 1993
- José Luis Mollaghan: 2 October 1993
- Francisco Polti Santillán: 22 August 1994
- Guillermo Rodríguez Melgarejo: 27 September 1994

Antonio Quarracino (8 August 1923 – 28 February 1998) was an Argentine prelate and cardinal of the Catholic Church in Argentina and the archbishop of Buenos Aires between 1990 and 1998.

== Biography ==
=== Early life and priesthood ===
Quarracino was born in Pollica, Province of Salerno, Italy. His family emigrated to Argentina when he was 4 years old, settling in the town of San Andrés de Giles in the province of Buenos Aires. He was ordained a priest on 22 December 1945, and became a professor at the diocesan seminary of Mercedes. He also taught theology at the Universidad Católica Argentina.

=== Episcopate and cardinalate ===
Quarracino was appointed Bishop of Nueve de Julio, Buenos Aires, by Pope John XXIII, on 3 February 1962, and received the episcopal see on 8 April of the same year. He participated in all sessions of the Second Vatican Council (1962–1965). On 3 August 1968 Paul VI moved him to the diocese of Avellaneda (whose new cathedral was built during his rule).

John Paul II promoted him to the Archdiocese of La Plata on 18 December 1985, and then on 10 July 1990 to the Archdiocese of Buenos Aires, a see to which is attached the title of Primate of Argentina. He was elected to preside over the Argentine Episcopal Conference in the following November, and then reelected until 1996. He was elevated to Cardinal-Priest of S. Maria della Salute a Primavalle in consistory on 28 June 1991.

On 27 June 1992 he was the principal consecrator of Jorge Mario Bergoglio, S.J., later Pope Francis, as bishop.

=== Death ===
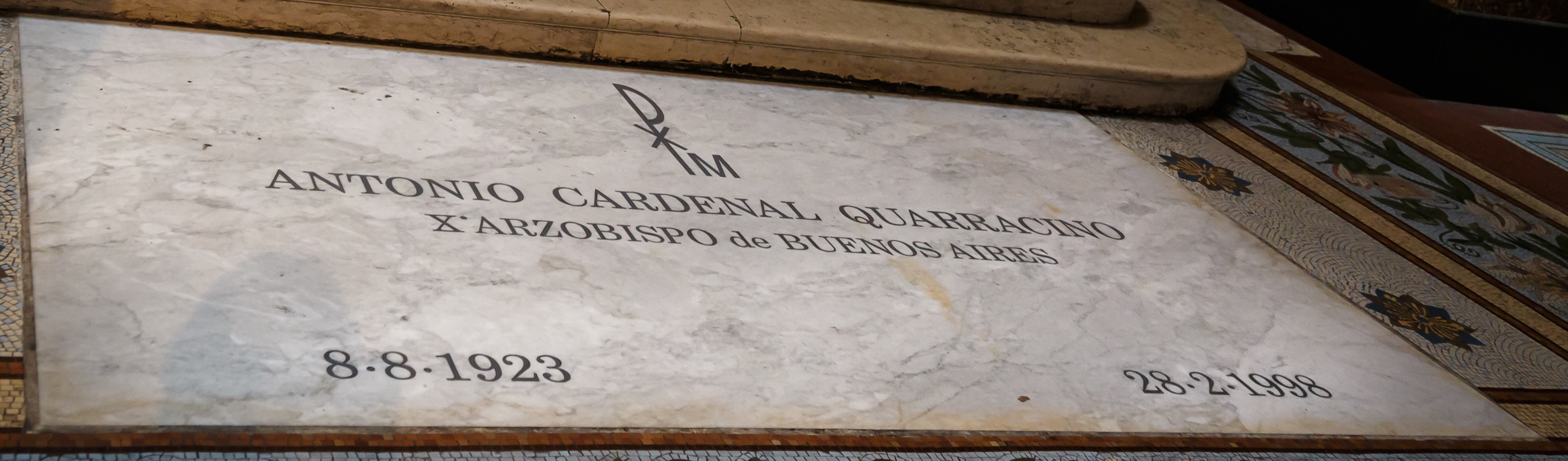
Tomb in the metropolitan cathedral.

Quarracino died in 1998 at the age of 74 at the Otamendi Hospital, due to a cardiac arrest. His doctors announced that his death came due to complications following intestinal surgery on 21 February 1998. He was succeeded automatically by his coadjutor bishop, the Jesuit Jorge Mario Bergoglio.

== Views ==
=== Inter-religious dialogue with Jews ===
Quarracino was a major figure of inter-religious discussion with Jews. During a visit to Israel in 1992 he was decorated by Jewish institutions for this cause, and in 1997 he had a mural painting set up in the Cathedral of Buenos Aires commemorating the victims of the Holocaust and the bombings of the Israeli Embassy and the AMIA.

=== Social communications ===
Quarracino was inclined to journalism and, while in La Plata, he renewed the informative magazine of the archdiocese, transforming it into a full-fledged cultural publication. As Bishop of Buenos Aires, he appeared on TV regularly; he was in charge of a segment in a religious program (Claves para un mundo mejor) in the state-owned channel ATC.

=== Dirty War ===
Quarracino was outspoken about controversial topics. One of his first notable public statements was his support, in 1982, of a project of law that would end all investigation of the crimes of the Dirty War, in order to "contribute to national reconciliation". This can be seen as a precedent of the Ley de Punto Final, sanctioned in 1986.

=== Divorce ===
In 1990, Quarracino attracted controversy after criticizing a recently approved divorce law, saying that it had been the work of "Masonic influences" and that it also severely "weakened the Argentine people's traditional religious spirit".

=== Argentine politics ===
Quarracino was opposed to the policies of president Raúl Alfonsín (1983–1989) and accused politicians of corruption, as the cause of "national poverty". However, he acknowledged being a friend of president Carlos Menem (1989–1999) who was heavily criticized by other Church leaders (such as Cardinal Primatesta).

=== Homosexuality ===
In 1994, during his TV segment in ATC, Quarracino spoke against homosexuality saying that lesbians and gay men should be "locked up in a ghetto". This caused an accusation of discrimination, which was not considered by justice because anti-discrimination Law 23592 did not cover sexual orientation. Three years before he had termed homosexuality "a deviation of human nature, like bestiality".

=== Boca Juniors ===
The Cardinal was an avowed fan of the Boca Juniors football team. When he celebrated his 50 years of priesthood he received a Boca Juniors shirt signed by all the team members.

Catholic Church titles
Preceded by Juan Carlos Aramburu	Archbishop of Buenos Aires; 10 July 1990 – 28 February 1998	Succeeded by Jorge Mario Bergoglio
