= Anunciado Serafini =

Argentine Catholic bishop (1898–1963)

- Bishop of Mercedes
- Church: Roman Catholic Church
- Diocese: Mercedes
- Appointed: 18 March 1939
- Installed: 29 June 1939
- Term ended: 18 February 1963
- Predecessor: Juan Pascual Chimento
- Successor: Luis Juan Tomé
- Other posts: Auxiliary Bishop of La Plata (1935–1939); Titular Bishop of Arycanda (1935–1939)

Orders
- Ordination: 20 December 1924
- Consecration: 25 July 1935 by Zenobio Lorenzo Guilland

Personal details
- Born: 16 November 1898 Tres Arroyos, Buenos Aires Province, Argentina
- Died: 18 February 1963 (aged 64) Vigo, Francoist Spain

Ordination history
History
Priestly ordination
- Date: 20 December 1924
Episcopal consecration
- Principal consecrator: Zenobio Lorenzo Guilland
- Co-consecrators: Fortunado Devoto, Miguel de Andrea
- Date: 25 July 1935
Episcopal succession
Bishops consecrated by Anunciado Serafini as principal consecrator
- Vicente Alfredo Aducci: 14 August 1960
- Antonio Quarracino: 8 April 1962

Anunciado Serafini (16 November 1898 – 18 February 1963) was the Roman Catholic bishop of what is now the Roman Catholic Archdiocese of Mercedes-Luján, Argentina. Ordained to the priesthood on 20 December 1924, Serafini was named Auxiliary Bishop of La Plata and Titular Bishop of Arycanda in 1935, and then Bishop of Mercedes in 1939.

On 8 April 1962, Bishop Serafini consecrated Antonio Quarracino to the episcopacy. As Cardinal Quarracino later conducted the episcopal consecration of Jorge Mario Bergoglio, the future Pope Francis, Bishop Serafini is part of that pope's episcopal lineage.
