= Fernando Carlos Maletti =

Argentine prelate of the Catholic church (1949–2022)

His Excellency The Most Reverend Fernando Carlos Maletti
- Bishop of Merlo-Moreno
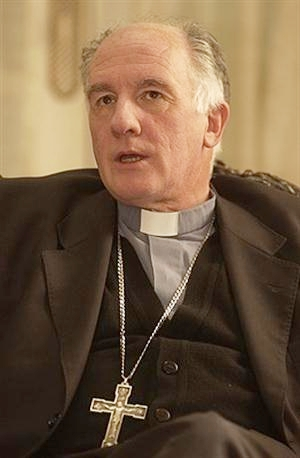
- Maletti in 2013
- Diocese: Merlo-Moreno
- Appointed: 6 May 2013
- Installed: 9 June 2013
- Term ended: 8 March 2022
- Predecessor: Fernando María Bargalló
- Successor: Juan José Chaparro Stivanello
- Previous post: Bishop of San Carlos de Bariloche (2001–2013)

Personal details
- Born: 17 March 1949 (Note: In 2001, the Vatican reported Maletti's birth year as 1947, but this appears to be a mistake as a later press release from the Vatican in 2013 reported his birth year as 1949 and another source reported his age when he died in 2022 as 72.) Buenos Aires, Argentina
- Died: 8 March 2022 (aged 72) Buenos Aires, Argentina
- Motto: Consuelen a mi pueblo (Comfort My People)

Ordination history
History
Priestly ordination
- Ordained by: Juan Carlos Aramburu
Episcopal consecration
- Principal consecrator: Jorge Mario Bergoglio
- Co-consecrators: Rubén Oscar Frassia, Raúl Omar Rossi, Horacio Ernesto Benites Astoul
Episcopal succession
Bishops consecrated by Fernando Carlos Maletti as principal consecrator
- Juan José Chaparro Stivanello: 2013
- Oscar Eduardo Miñarro: 2016

Styles of Fernando Carlos Maletti
- Reference style: His Excellency; The Most Reverend
- Spoken style: Your Excellency
- Religious style: Bishop

Fernando Carlos Maletti (17 March 1949 – 8 March 2022) was an Argentine prelate of the Catholic Church in Argentina. He served as bishop of San Carlos de Bariloche from 2001 until 2013 and as the bishop of Merlo-Moreno from 2013 until his death in 2022 at the age of 72.

== Life and career ==
Born in Buenos Aires, Maletti was ordained to the priesthood on 24 November 1973. As a priest he served in various roles:

- 1973–1977 Cooperator Vicar
- 1977 Formator in the Major Seminary
- 1981–1983 Councilor of the Archdiocesan Council of Young Women of Catholic Action
- 1983–1988 Director of the "Saint Joseph" Vocational Institute
- 1988 Judge of the Interdiocesan Tribunal
- 1988 Parish Priest of San Cayetano, in Buenos Aires
- 1989–1990 Deputy Councilor of the Archdiocesan Council of Women of Catholic Action
- 1989 Dean of Deanery 11 of Buenos Aires
- 1989 Member of the College of Consultors and of the Presbyteral Council

On 20 July 2001, Maletti was appointed bishop of San Carlos de Bariloche. He received his episcopal consecration on the following 18 September from Jorge Mario Bergoglio, archbishop of Buenos Aires and later Pope Francis, with bishop of Avellaneda-Lanús, Rubén Oscar Frassia, bishop of San Martín, Raúl Omar Rossi, auxiliary bishop of Buenos Aires, Horacio Ernesto Benites Astoul, and auxiliary bishop of Buenos Aires, Jorge Eduardo Lozano, serving as co-consecrators. He was installed as bishop on 22 September 2001.

On 6 May 2013, he was appointed bishop of Merlo-Moreno installed on the following 9 June.

As part of the Episcopal Conference of Argentina, Maletti served in different roles, including:

- President of the Episcopal Commission for Aid to Regions in Need
- Member of the Commission for Aborigines.
- Head of the national commission for the pastoral care of addictions and drug dependence

Maletti died on 8 March 2022 in Buenos Aires, at the age of 72, from COVID-19, during the COVID-19 pandemic in Argentina. A funeral mass for Malettie was celebrated by the Archbishop of Buenos Aires and Cardinal Primate of Argentina, Mario Aurelio Poli, on 9 March at the Cathedral of Our Lady of the Rosary in Moreno.

== Notes ==
Catholic Church titles
Preceded by Fernando María Bargalló	Bishop of Merlo-Moreno; 2013–2022	Succeeded by Juan José Chaparro Stivanello
Preceded by Rubén Oscar Frassia	Bishop of San Carlos de Bariloche; 2001–2013	Succeeded by Juan José Chaparro Stivanello
