= José Antonio Gentico =

Catholic bishop (1931–2007)

José Antonio Gentico (November 28, 1931 – April 5, 2007) was a prelate of the Roman Catholic Church. He served as auxiliary bishop of Buenos Aires from 2001 until his death in 2007.

== Life ==
Born in Arnedo, Spain, Gentico was ordained to the priesthood on November 30, 1968.

On March 21, 2001, he was appointed auxiliary bishop of Buenos Aires and titular bishop of Mizigi. Gentico received his episcopal consecration on the following April 28 from Jorge Mario Bergoglio, archbishop of Buenos Aires, the later pope Francis, with bishop of Morón, Justo Oscar Laguna, bishop of San Martín, Raúl Omar Rossi, auxiliary bishop of Buenos Aires, Joaquín Mariano Sucunza, and auxiliary bishop of Buenos Aires, Guillermo Rodríguez Melgarejo, serving as co-consecrators.

He died on April 5, 2007.

== See also ==
- Catholic Church in Argentina
