= Diocese of San Justo =

Catholic ecclesiastical territory

Diocese of San Justo Dioecesis Sancti Iusti Diócesis de San Justo

Catholic

Location
- Country: Argentina
- Ecclesiastical province: Buenos Aires
- Metropolitan: Buenos Aires

Statistics
- Area: 130 km^{2} (50 sq mi)
- Population: Total; Catholics: (as of 2010); 1,083,000; 975,000 (90%)
- Parishes: 40

Information
- Denomination: Roman Catholic
- Rite: Roman Rite
- Established: 18 July 1969 (57 years ago)
- Cathedral: Cathedral St Justus and St Pastor in San Justo
- Patron saint: Sts Justus and Pastor; Mary Mother of God

Current leadership
- Pope: Leo XIV
- Bishop: Eduardo Horacio García
- Metropolitan Archbishop: Jorge Ignacio García Cuerva
- Bishops emeritus: Baldomero Carlos Martini

Website
- Website of the Diocese

The Roman Catholic Diocese of San Justo is located in the city of San Justo, in the province of Buenos Aires. It was established by Pope Paul VI on 18 July 1969.

== Bishops ==
=== Ordinaries ===
- Jorge Carlos Carreras (1969 – 1982), retired
- Rodolfo Bufano (1982 – 1990)
- Jorge Arturo Meinvielle, S.D.B. (1991 – 2003)
- Baldomero Carlos Martini (2004 – 2014), retired
- Eduardo Horacio García (2014 – Present)

=== Auxiliary bishops ===
- Rodolfo Bufano (1978-1980), appointed Bishop of Chascomús (later returned here as Bishop)
- Antonio Federico Gatti (1996-1998)
- Damián Santiago Bitar (2008-2010), appointed Bishop of Oberá

=== Other priest of this diocese who became bishop ===
- Juan Horacio Suárez, appointed Bishop of Gregorio de Laferrere in 2000
