= Ernesto Segura =

Catholic bishop (1914–1972)

Ernesto Segura (October 24, 1914 – March 13, 1972) was a prelate of the Roman Catholic Church. He served as auxiliary bishop of Buenos Aires from 1962 till his death in 1972.

== Early life ==
Born in Mar del Plata, Segura was ordained to the priesthood on October 29, 1939.

== Career ==
On April 7, 1962, he was appointed auxiliary bishop of Buenos Aires and titular bishop of Carpi. Segura received his episcopal consecration on the following April 29 from Antonio Cardinal Caggiano, archbishop of Buenos Aires, with the archbishop of Santa Fe, Nicolás Fasolino, who would later become a cardinal, and the bishop of Santiago del Estero, Manuel Tato, serving as co-consecrators.

Tomé was a council father at the first, second, third and fourth session of the Second Vatican Council.

== Death ==
He died on March 13, 1972

== See also ==
- Catholic Church in Argentina
