= Vicente Bokalic Iglic =

Catholic archbishop (born 1952)

His Eminence Vicente Bokalic Iglic
- Cardinal, Archbishop of Santiago del Estero
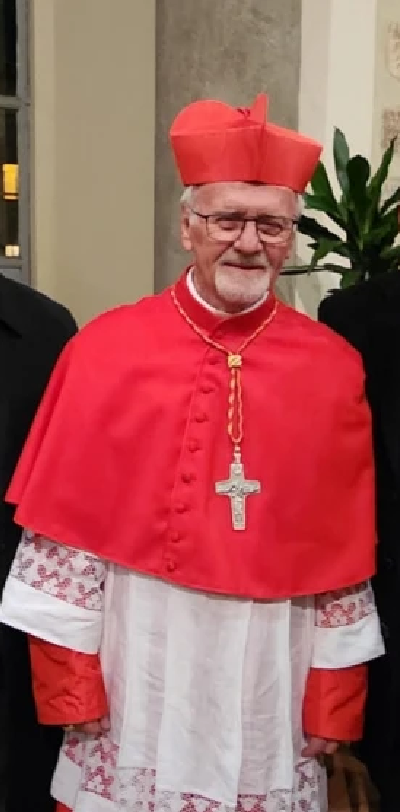
- Appointed: 22 July 2024
- Other post: Cardinal-Priest of Maria Maddalena in Campo Marzio (2024–)
- Previous posts: Missionary in the Territorial Prelature of Deán Funes (1994–1997); Auxiliary Bishop of Buenos Aires (2010–2013); Titular Bishop of Summa (2010–2013); Bishop of Santiago del Estero (2013–2024)

Orders
- Ordination: 11 Apr 1978
- Consecration: 29 May 2010 by Jorge Bergoglio
- Created cardinal: 7 December 2024 by Pope Francis
- Rank: Cardinal-Priest

Personal details
- Born: 11 June 1952 (age 74) Buenos Aires, Argentina
- Motto: Me envió a evangelizar a los pobres; (He sent me to evangelize the poor)
- Coat of arms

Styles of Vicente Bokalic Iglic
- Reference style: His Eminence
- Spoken style: Your Eminence
- Religious style: Cardinal
- Informal style: Cardinal
- See: Santiago del Estero

Vicente Bokalic Iglic, C.M. (Slovene: Vinko Bokalič Iglič, born 11 June 1952) is an Argentine Catholic prelate who served as Bishop of Santiago del Estero from 2013 to 2024, and became archbishop when the diocese became an archdiocese in 2024. The same year, he was given the title "Primate of Argentina". Iglic was made a cardinal in 2024. He was previously an auxiliary bishop for the Archdiocese of Buenos Aires from 2010 to 2013 under Cardinal Jorge Bergoglio, the future Pope Francis. He is a member of the Congregation of the Mission.

== Life ==
Vicente Bokalic Iglic was born on 11 June 1952 in Lanús, Buenos Aires Province, on 11 June 1952. His parents had emigrated there from Slovenia in 1949. He entered the Congregation of the Mission (Vincentians) in 1970. He studied philosophy at the Jesuit Maximo College in San Miguel and theology at the Seminary of Buenos Aires. He took his final vows as a Lazarist on 5 June 1976. He was ordained a priest on 11 April 1978.

He was responsible for the vocational and youth ministry of the Buenos Aires archdiocese and also parish vicar of Nuestra Señora de la Medalla Milagrosa for the next two years. Within his order he was a formator and bursar from 1983 to 1986 and superior of their seminary from 1987 to 1990. He worked again at Nuestra Señora de la Medalla Milagrosa Parish from 1991 to 1993. He was a missionary in the Territorial Prelature of Deán Funes from 1994 to 1997 and then superior of his order's seminary in San Miguel from 1997 to 2000.

After working as a missionary and parish priest in the diocese of Goya from 2000 to 2003, he was provincial superior of the Lazarists from December 2003 to December 2009, and then returned to Nuestra Señora de la Medalla Milagrosa Parish for several months.

On 15 March 2010, Pope Benedict XVI appointed him auxiliary bishop of Buenos Aires and titular bishop of Summa. Iglic received his episcopal consecration on 29 May from Archbishop Jorge Bergoglio of Buenos Aires, later Pope Francis, with Archbishop Andrés Stanovnik of Corrientes and Bishop Mario Aurelio Poli of Santa Rosa as co-consecrators.

On 23 December 2013, Pope Francis appointed him bishop of Santiago del Estero. He was installed there on 9 March 2014.

On 22 July 2024, Pope Francis elevated the diocese of Santiago del Estero to the rank of archdiocese and named Iglic its first archbishop, while also giving him the title "Primate of Argentina".

On 6 October 2024, Pope Francis announced that he planned to make Bokalic Iglic a cardinal on 8 December, a date that was later changed to 7 December.

On 7 December 2024, Pope Francis made him a cardinal, assigning him as a member of the order of cardinal priests the title of Santa Maria Maddalena in Campo Marzio.

He participated as a cardinal elector in the 2025 papal conclave that elected Pope Leo XIV.

== See also ==
- Catholic Church in Argentina
- Cardinals created by Pope Francis
