= Eduardo Horacio García =

Prelate of the roman catholic church

- Bishop of San Justo
- Church: Catholic Church
- Diocese: Diocese of San Justo
- Appointed: 6 November 2014
- Predecessor: Baldomero Carlos Martini
- Previous posts: Titular Bishop of Ipagro (2003-2014); Auxiliary Bishop of Buenos Aires (2003-2014)

Orders
- Ordination: 18 November 1983 by Juan Carlos Aramburu
- Consecration: 16 August 2003 by Jorge Mario Bergoglio

Personal details
- Born: 22 January 1956 (age 70) Buenos Aires, Argentina
- Coat of arms

Eduardo Horacio García (born 22 January 1956) is a prelate of the Roman Catholic Church. He serves as bishop of San Justo since 2014.

== Life ==
Born in Buenos Aires, García was ordained to the priesthood on November 18, 1983.

On June 21, 2003, he was appointed auxiliary bishop of Buenos Aires and titular bishop of Ipagro. García received his episcopal consecration on the following August 16 from Jorge Mario Bergoglio, archbishop of Buenos Aires, the later pope Francis, with auxiliary bishops of Buenos Aires, Jorge Eduardo Lozano and José Antonio Gentico, serving as co-consecrators.
