= Santiago del Estero Cathedral =

Roman Catholic cathedral in Argentina

- Primatial Cathedral-Basilica of our Lady of Mount Carmel
- Catedral Basílica Primada de Nuestra Señora del Carmel
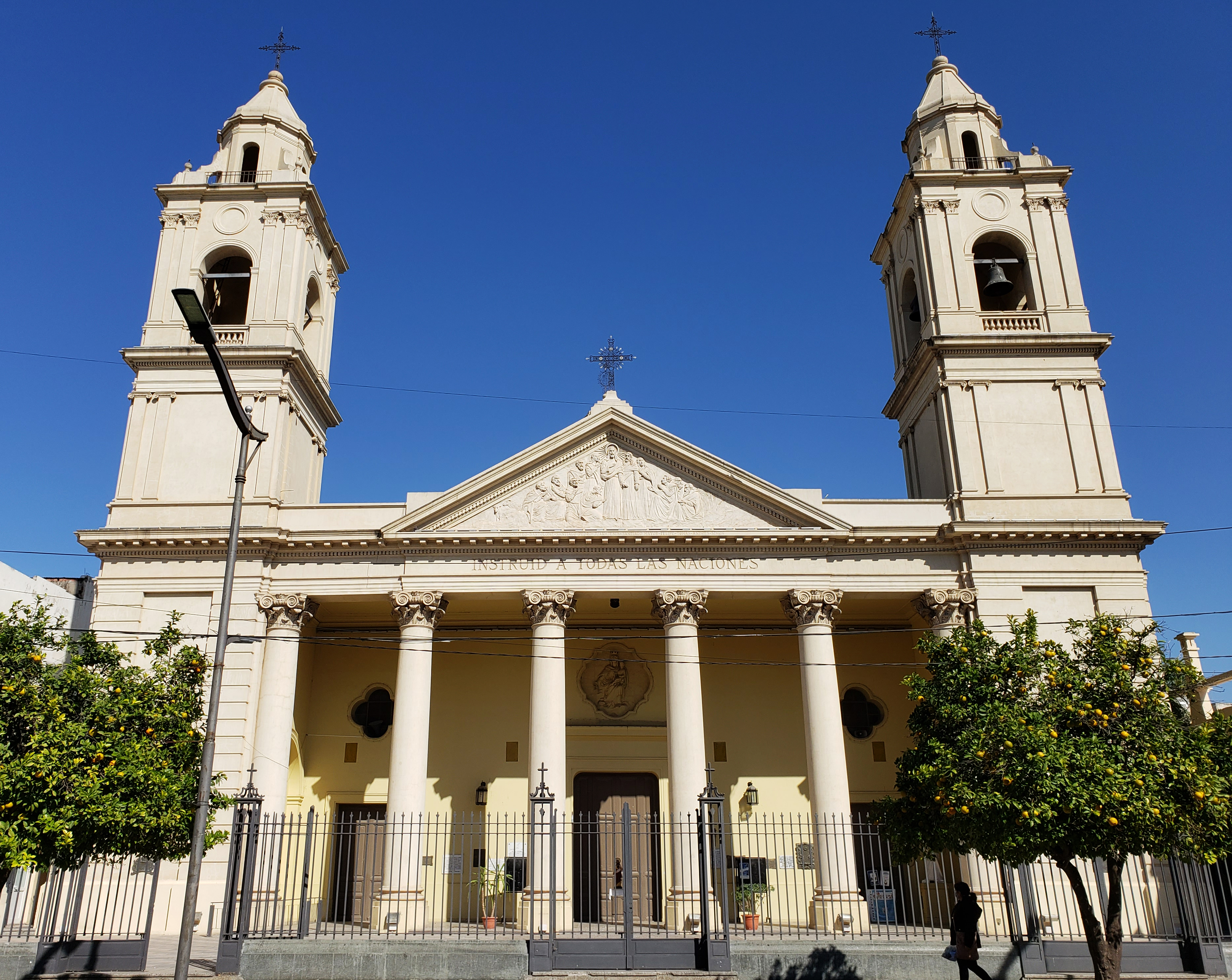
- West façade
- Santiago del Estero Cathedral
- 27.788007°S 64.260290°W
- Location: Santiago del Estero
- Address: 55, 24 de Septiembre Street
- Country: Argentina
- Denomination: Catholic

History
- Status: Cathedral
- Dedication: Virgin of Carmel
- Dedicated: 25 March 1907

Architecture
- Style: Neoclassical
- Groundbreaking: 26 August 1868
- Completed: 13 January 1877

Administration
- Metropolis: Tucumán
- Diocese: Santiago del Estero

Clergy
- Archbishop: Vicente Bokalic Iglic

National Historic Monument of Argentina
- Type: Historical National Monument
- Criteria: Historical Monument
- Designated: 28 July 1853
- Reference no.: 13723

The Primatial Metropolitan Cathedral-Basilica of our Lady of Mount Carmel is a Roman Catholic cathedral located in Santiago del Estero, in Northeastern Argentina. It is the seat of the Roman Catholic Archdiocese of Santiago del Estero since 1907 (then a diocese), when it was created by Pope Pius X. It is dedicated to Our Lady of Mount Carmel.

The current Neoclassical building is the fifth cathedral building to be built in the city since the 16th Century. Santiago del Estero was one of the oldest Spanish settlements in the country. The previous buildings were lost through fires, flooding and falling into disrepair. The Cathedral was declared a minor basilica on 20 January 1971, and it has been listed as a Historical National Monument of Argentina since 1953.

On 7 September 2024, it was elevated to the rank of Primatial cathedral of Argentina (transferred from the Cathedral of the Holy Trinity in Buenos Aires) by Pope Francis, alluding historical reasons, as it was in Santiago del Estero that the first local diocese was created in 1570. In the same act, the Diocese of Santiago del Estero was elevated to the rank of an archdiocese, but it continues to be suffragan to the Archdiocese of Tucumán.

== Gallery ==
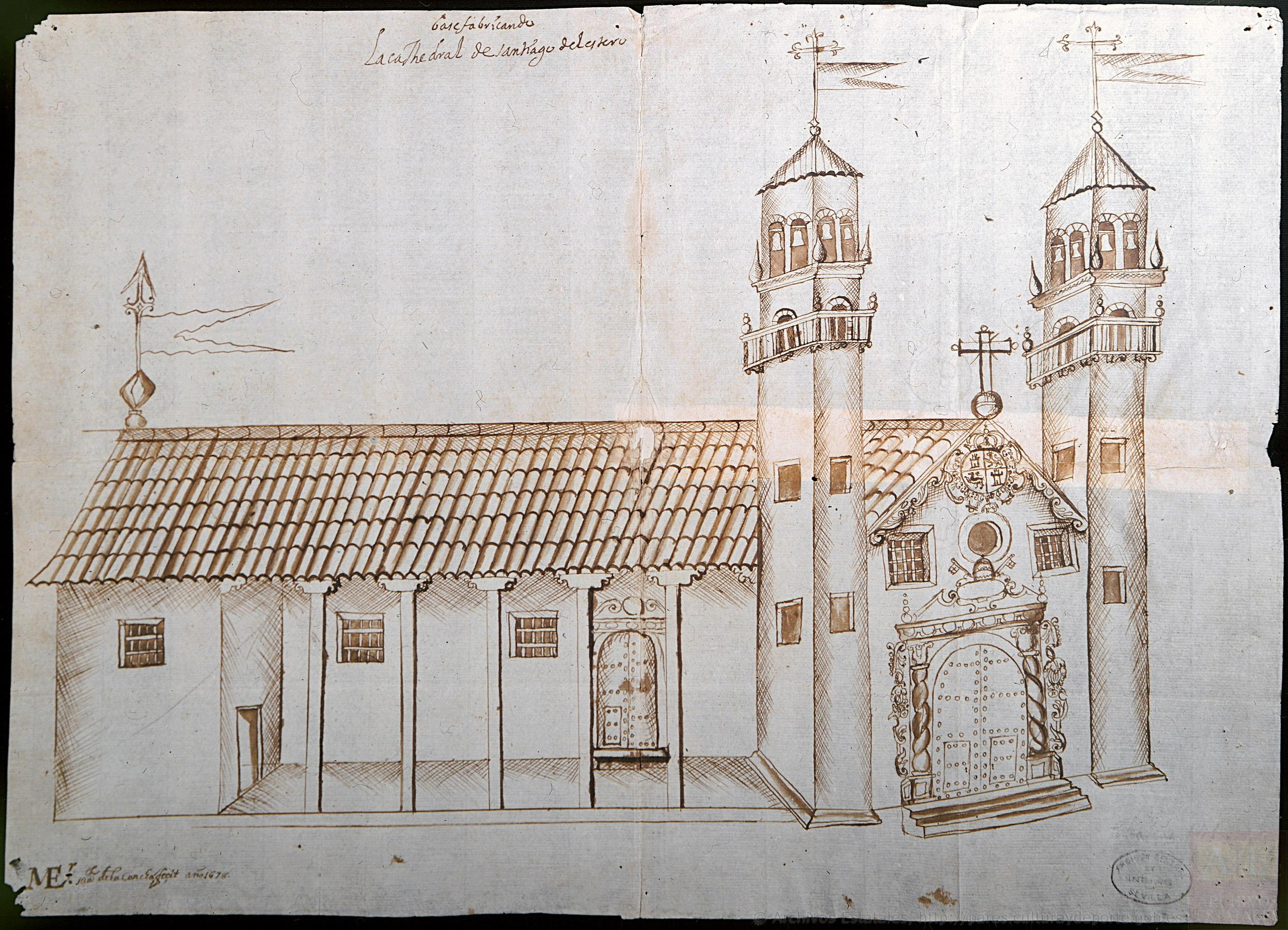
A former temple in 1678

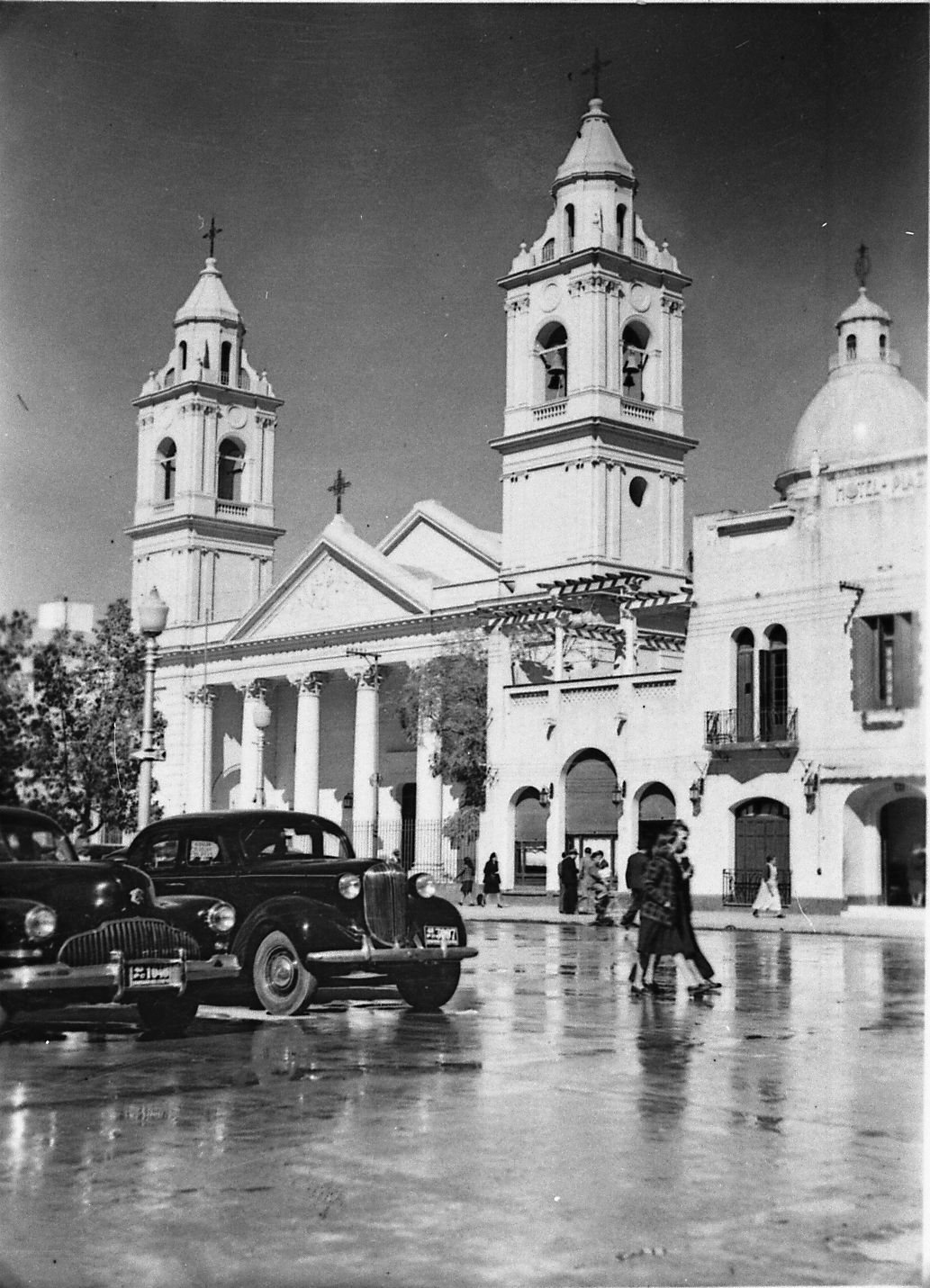
The current building in the 1940s

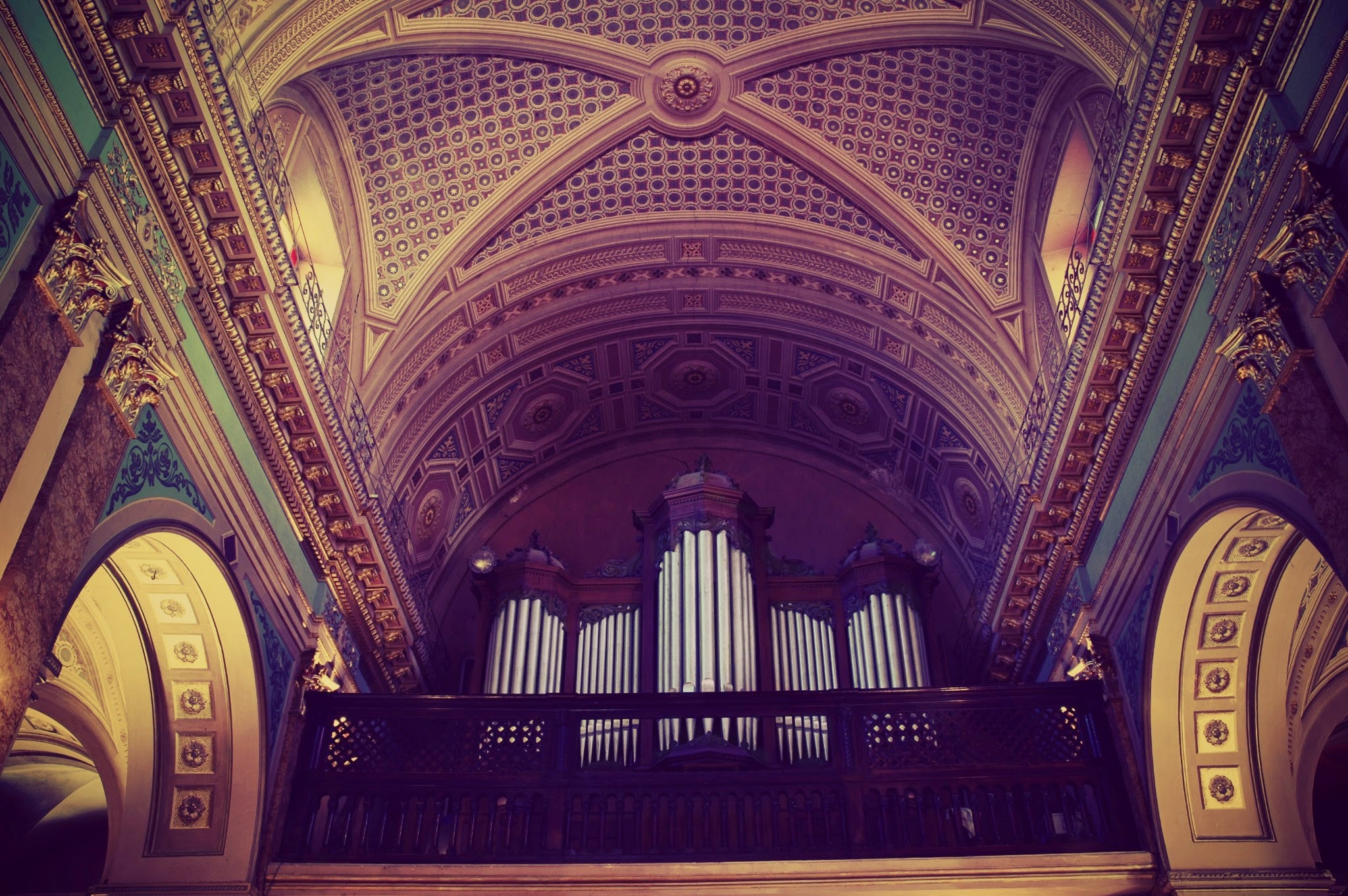
Pipe organ

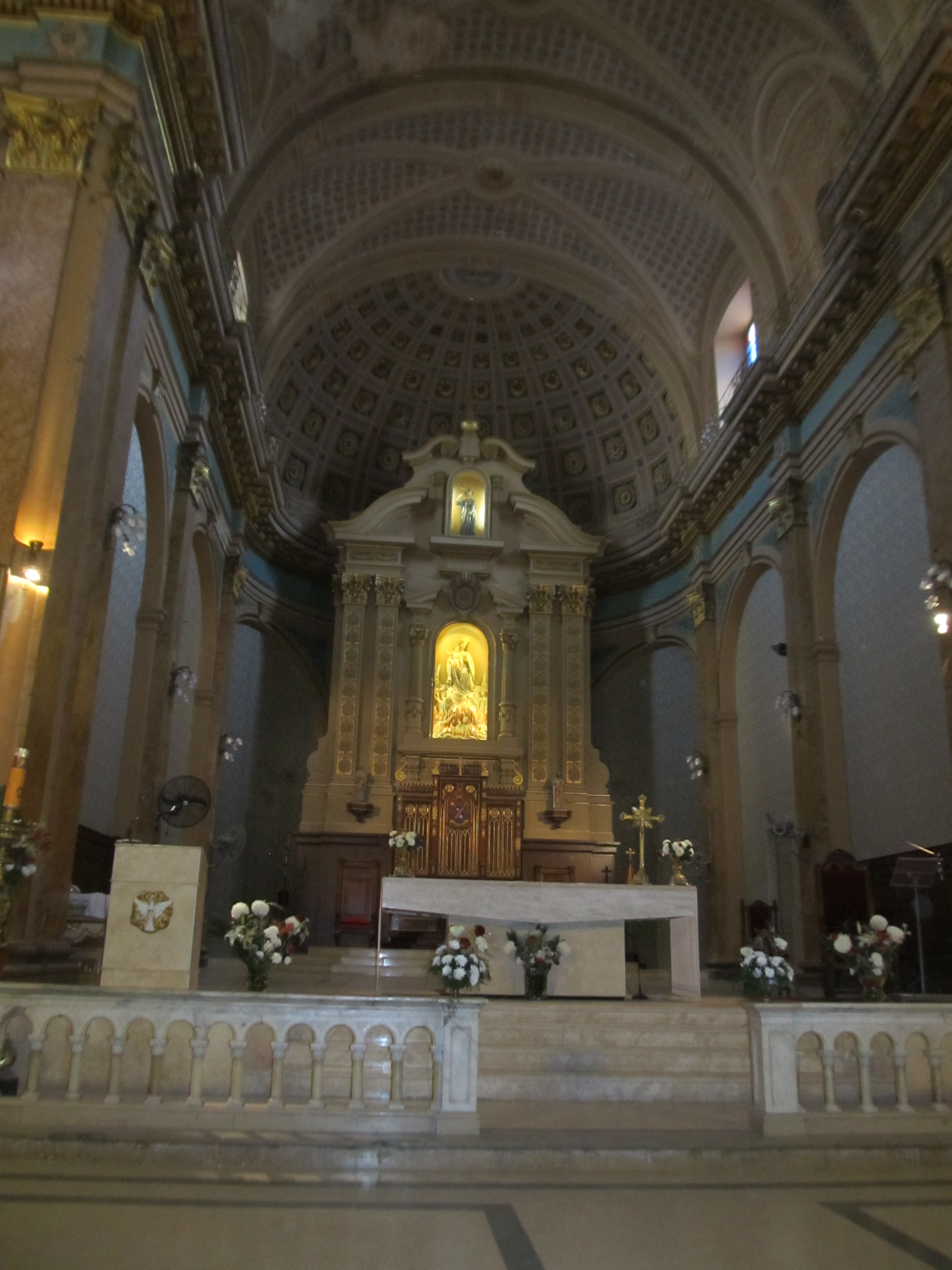
Main altar

== See also ==
- Religion in Argentina
- Roman Catholicism in Argentina
