= Diocese of Gregorio de Laferrere =

Catholic ecclesiastical territory

Diocese of Gregorio de Laferrere Dioecesis Gregorii de Laferrere Diócesis de Gregorio de Laferrere

Catholic
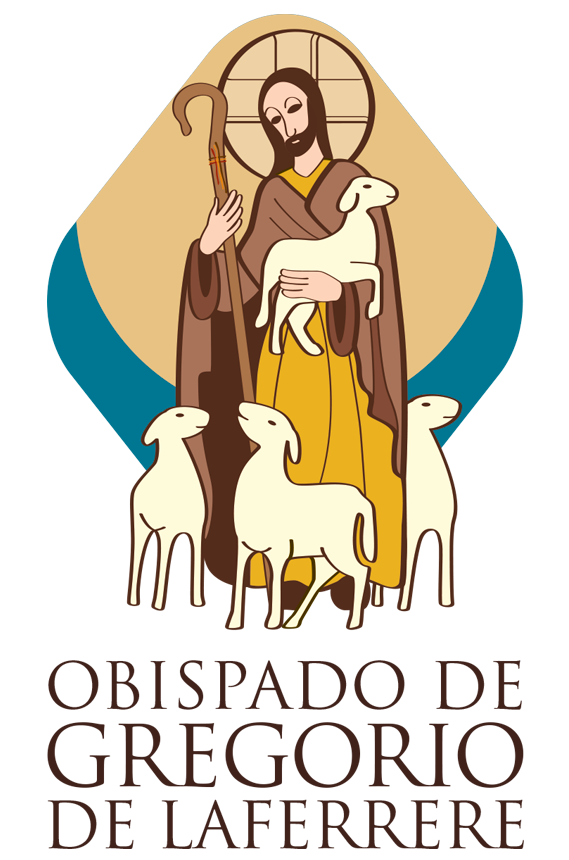

Location
- Country: Argentina
- Ecclesiastical province: Buenos Aires
- Metropolitan: Buenos Aires

Statistics
- Area: 1,393 km^{2} (538 sq mi)
- Population: Total; Catholics: (as of 2006); 714,000; 644,000 (90.2%)
- Parishes: 26

Information
- Denomination: Roman Catholic
- Rite: Roman Rite
- Established: 25 November 2000 (25 years ago)
- Cathedral: Cathedral of Christ the King in Gregorio de Laferrère
- Patron saint: Christ the King

Current leadership
- Pope: Leo XIV
- Bishop: Jorge Martín Torres Carbonell
- Metropolitan Archbishop: Jorge Ignacio García Cuerva
- Bishops emeritus: Juan Horacio Suárez Bishop Emeritus (2000-2013)

The Roman Catholic Diocese of Gregorio de Laferrere (erected 25 November 2000) is in Argentina and is a suffragan of the Archdiocese of Buenos Aires.

== Ordinaries ==
- Juan Horacio Suárez (25 November 2000 − 19 December 2013)
- Gabriel Bernardo Barba (1 March 2014 – 9 June 2020), appointed Bishop of San Luis
- Jorge Martín Torres Carbonell (30 June 2020 – present)

== External links and references ==
- "Diocese of Gregorio de Laferrere". Catholic-Hierarchy. ^{[self-published]}
