= Horacio Ernesto Benites Astoul =

Catholic bishop (1933–2016)

Horacio Ernesto Benites Astoul (November 3, 1933 – May 25, 2016) was a prelate of the Roman Catholic Church. He served as auxiliary bishop of Buenos Aires from 1999 until 2008. He died on the May Revolution day of 2016 in Buenos Aires.

== Life ==
Born in Buenos Aires, Benites Astoul was ordained to the priesthood on September 22, 1962.

On March 16, 1999, he was appointed auxiliary bishop of Buenos Aires and titular bishop of Lamzella. Benites Astoul received his episcopal consecration on the following May 1 from Jorge Mario Bergoglio, archbishop of Buenos Aires, the later Pope Francis, with auxiliary bishop of Buenos Aires, Mario José Serra, and emeritus auxiliary bishop of Buenos Aires, Guillermo Leaden, serving as co-consecrators.

On December 1, 2008 Pope Benedict XVI accepted his retirement, on grounds of his age.
