= Brédice =

Brédice or Bredice is a surname. Notable people with the surname include:

- John Bredice (1934–1997), American football player
- Leticia Brédice (born 1975), Argentine actress and singer
- Rinaldo Fidel Brédice (1932–2018), Argentine Catholic bishop
