= Cathedral of Our Lady of Nahuel Huapi =

Coordinates: 41.1328°S 71.3028°W

- Cathedral of Carlos de Bariloche
- Catedral de Nuestra Señora del Nahuel Huapi
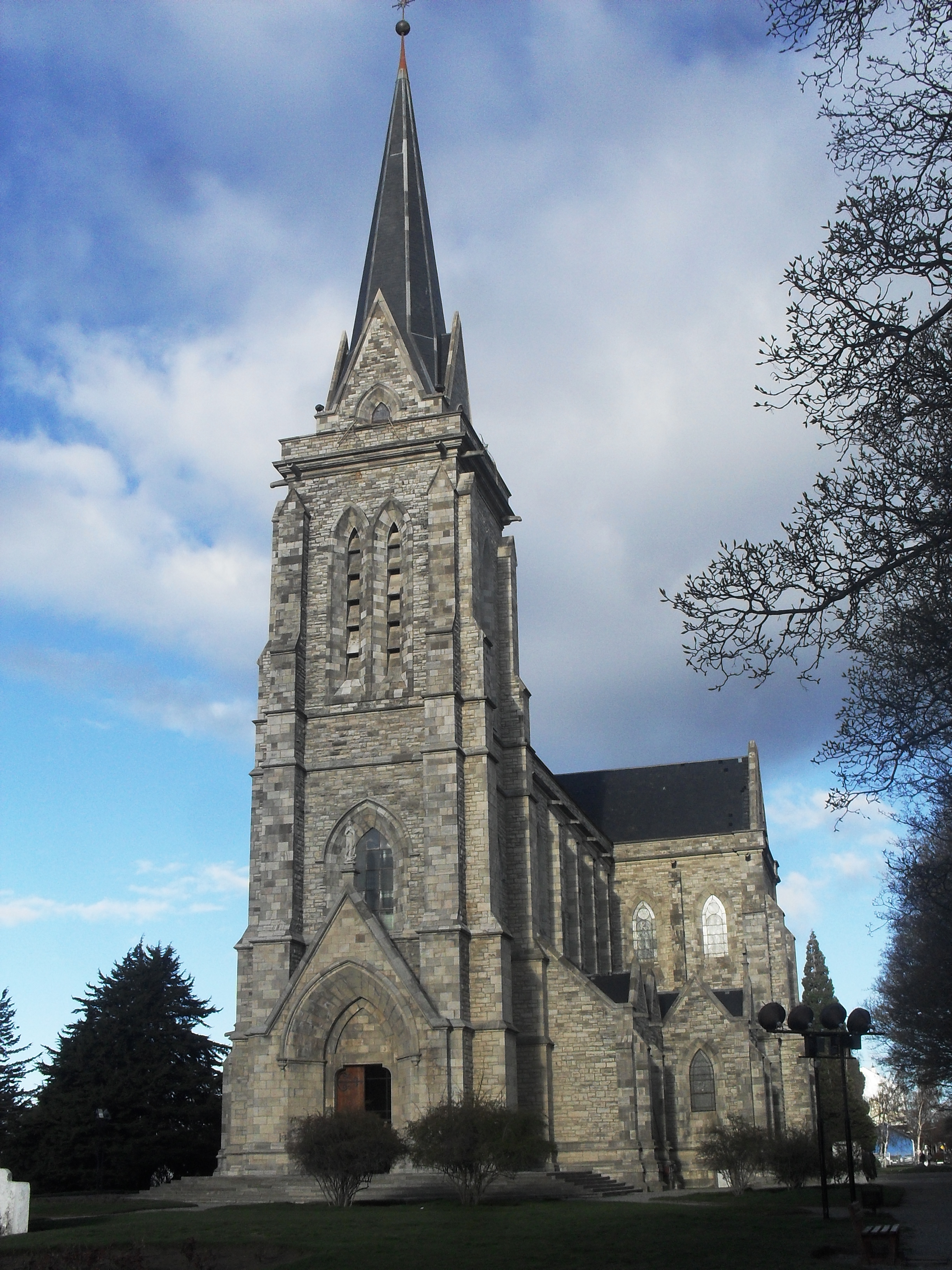
- Cathedral of Our Lady of Nahuel Huapi
- Location: San Carlos de Bariloche
- Country: Argentina
- Denomination: Roman Catholic Church

Administration
- Diocese: Roman Catholic Diocese of San Carlos de Bariloche

The Cathedral of Our Lady of Nahuel Huapi (Spanish: Catedral de Nuestra Señora del Nahuel Huapi) Also Cathedral of Carlos de Bariloche is the main Catholic cathedral within the city of San Carlos de Bariloche, in Patagonia Argentina. It is located on large plot of land close to the Nahuel Huapi Lake, surrounded by beautiful gardens, and is within the Diocese of Bariloche, suffragan of the Archdiocese of Bahía Blanca.

For the construction of the cathedral of Bariloche, the architect Alejandro Bustillo offered his project for free. His sentiment was oriented in a Gothic Revival style with French reminiscences.

It was built between 1942 and 1944. The stained glass windows were laid in 1947.

== Gallery ==
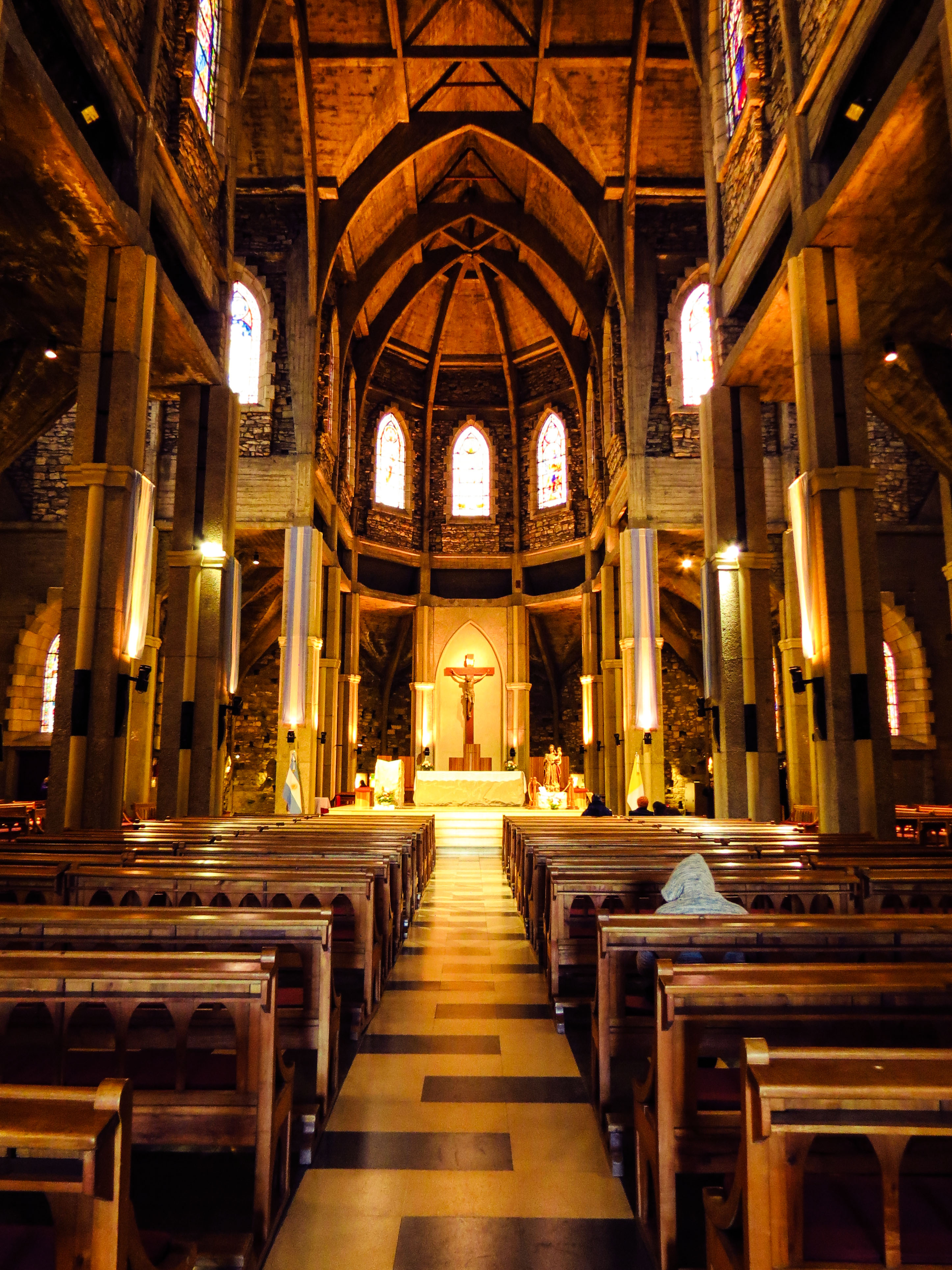
Internal view of the cathedral.

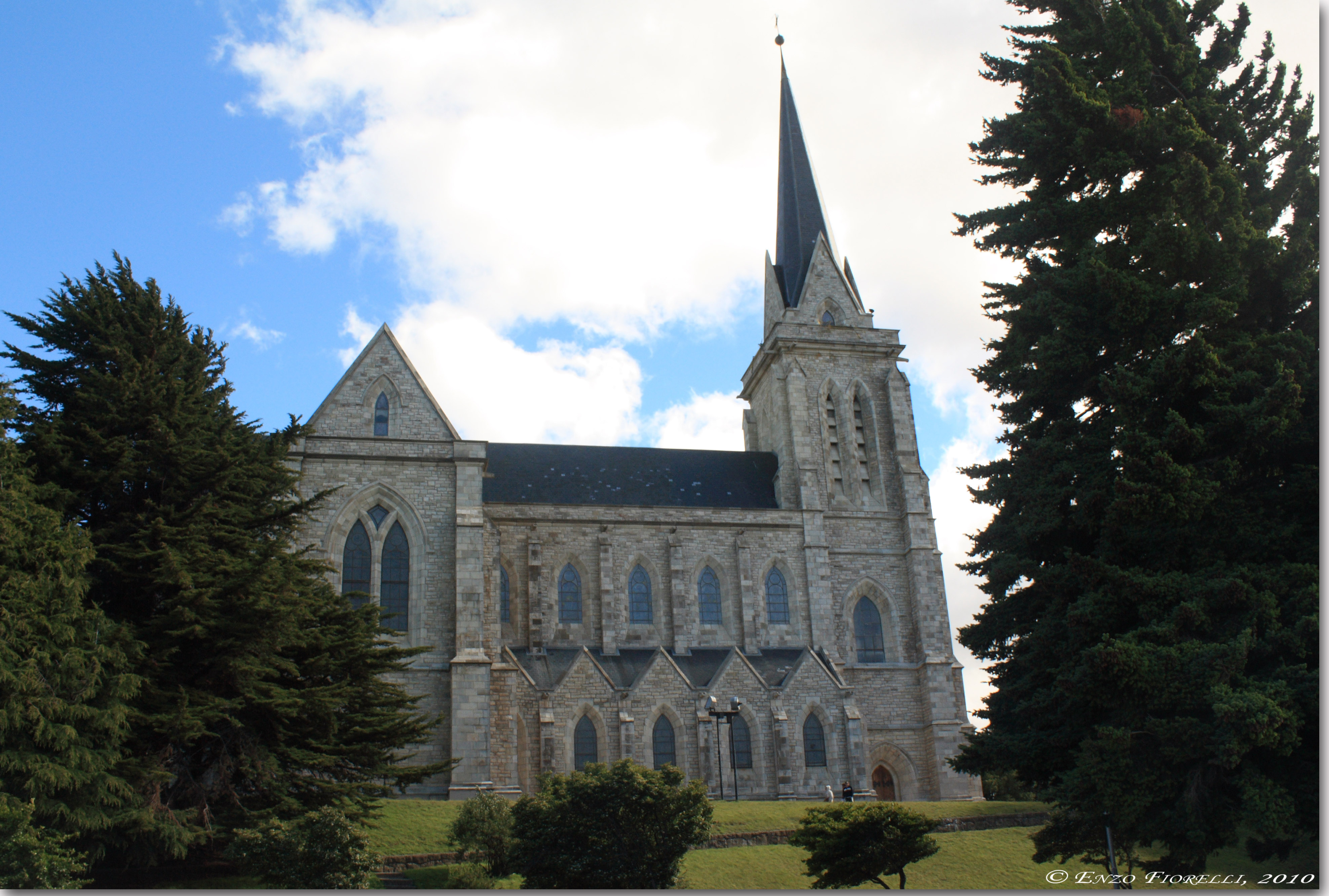
Cathedral from Nahuel Huapi Lake.

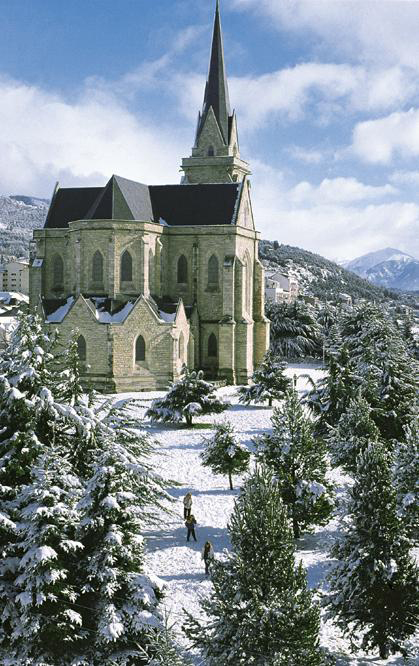
The cathedral in winter with snowy landscapes.

== See also ==
- List of cathedrals in Argentina
- Roman Catholicism in Argentina
- Our Lady
