= Gerardo Eusebio Sueldo =

- Bishop of Santiago del Estero
- Church: Catholic Church
- Diocese: Diocese of Santiago del Estero
- In office: 23 November 1994 – 4 September 1998
- Predecessor: Manuel Guirao
- Successor: Juan Carlos Maccarone
- Previous posts: Coadjutor Bishop of Santiago del Estero (1993-1994); Bishop of Orán (1982-1993)

Orders
- Ordination: 9 July 1961
- Consecration: 3 July 1982 by Alfonso Pedro Torres Farías

Personal details
- Born: 21 August 1936 Rosario, Santa Fe Province, Argentina
- Died: 4 September 1998 (aged 62) San Marcos, Santiago del Estero Province, Argentina

Gerardo Eusebio Sueldo (21 August 1936 – 4 September 1998) was an Argentine prelate of the Catholic Church who was bishop of Santiago del Estero from 1992 until his death in a suspicious car accident in 1998. He was previously bishop of Orán from 1982 to 1993.

Years after his death, some press reports say he is remembered as "the voice of the voiceless".

== Biography ==
Gerardo Eusebio Sueldo was born in Rosario in the Province of Santa Fe on 21 August 1936. His family moved to Belén in the Province of Catamarca, when he was a child and he grew up there. He was ordained a priest on 9 July 1961.

On 30 April 1982, Pope John Paul II appointed him bishop of Orán. He received his episcopal consecration on 3 July from Alfonso Pedro Torres Farías, Bishop of Catamarca.

In 1986 he headed the Committee for Catechism of the Argentine Episcopal Conference.

On 15 May 1993, John Paul named him Coadjutor Bishop of Santiago del Estero. He was installed there on 31 October. He succeeded as bishop there on 23 November 1994, when Pope John Paul accepted the resignation of his predecessor Manuel Guirao.

On a visit to the Vatican in 1994, he told Pope John Paul that "not only are there poor people in Argentina, but that in many provinces, such as Santiago del Estero, poverty is not something circumstantial but is encouraged by power". Though he routinely received threats he continued to denounce the dominant local political boss Carlos Juarez for his "feudal" style and his attempts to "impose the culture of fear". He warned in his preaching against the development of "a culture of dependence and submission".

In 1997, he established a diocesan Secretariat for Human Rights and warned: "“I want to tell the friends of this secretariat that the pastoral area in which they find themselves is not easy, on the contrary it will be risky. They will have to get used not only to criticism, but much more, to defamation, slander, to being controlled and persecuted and why not say it, perhaps to jail."

He was instrumental in the creation of a pastoral office for native peoples within the Argentine Episcopal Conference.

Sueldo was severely injured in a car accident in San Marcos, a few miles from Santiago del Estero, before dawn on 4 September 1998, as he returned from the installation of Mario Cargnello as coadjutor archbishop in Salta. He died in a nearby hospital a few hours later. The police said he had swerved to avoid hitting a horse. His criticism of the regional government of Juárez made people doubtful it was an accident. Years later some press accounts continued to refer to it as an "alleged accident". A representative of Argentine president Menem, whose policies Sueldo had opposed, attended his funeral and dismissed the idea that his death was the result of an attack. In 2004, the judge responsible for investigating the accident said she was forced to close the case without a proper investigation, that officials of the local Department of Justice wanted it concluded after a few days, and no autopsy was conducted, leaving her with conjectures and unclear details. She noted the presence of unfamiliar police officials and plainclothes agents.
