= Juan Carlos Maccarone =

- Bishop of Santiago del Estero
- Church: Catholic Church
- Diocese: Diocese of Santiago del Estero
- In office: 18 February 1999 – 19 August 2005
- Predecessor: Gerardo Eusebio Sueldo
- Successor: Francisco Polti Santillán
- Previous posts: Bishop of Chascomús (1996-1999); Titular Bishop of Mauriana (1993-1996); Auxiliary Bishop of Lomas de Zamora (1993-1996)

Orders
- Ordination: 17 December 1968
- Consecration: 21 April 1993 by Desiderio Elso Collino

Personal details
- Born: 19 October 1940 Buenos Aires, Argentina
- Died: 29 March 2015 (aged 74) Claypole, Buenos Aires Province, Argentina

Juan Carlos Maccarone (19 October 1940 – 29 March 2015) was an Argentine prelate of the Catholic Church who was bishop of the Diocese of Santiago del Estero from 1999 to 2005, when he resigned after evidence he had engaged in same-sex relations with a 23-year-old man became public. He had been a bishop since 1993, serving as auxiliary bishop of Lomas de Zamora for three years and bishop of Chascomús for two and a half years.

== Early years ==
Maccarone was born on 19 October 1940 in Buenos Aires. He attended the "Republic of Honduras" school in Buenos Aires and then Mariano Moreno National School. He studied law at the "Universidad del Salvador" and entered Sacred Heart Seminary of the Archdiocese of La Plata in 1960. He studied philosophy at Saint Joseph Major Seminary there and dogmatic theology at the Pontifical Gregorian University in Rome. He was ordained a priest on 17 December 1968 in Immaculate Conception parish in Burzaco.

From 1968 to 1978 he was professor of theology at Saint Joseph Major Seminary and at the Faculty of Theology of the Catholic University. From 1969 to 1972 he was a professor at the Catholic University of La Plata and from 1973 to 1975 at the "Presbítero Antonio Saenz" faculty of the diocese of Lomas de Zamora.

== Bishop ==
On 30 January 1993 at the age of 52, Maccarone was appointed auxiliary bishop of Lomas de Zamora in Argentina and titular bishop of Mauriana. He received his episcopal consecration on 21 April 1993 from Desiderio Elso Collino, Bishop of Lomas de Zamora.

He was a member of the delegation that represented the bishops of Argentina at the Constitutional Assembly of 1994 that revised the national constitution.

On 3 July 1996, he was named bishop of Chascomús and he was installed there on 24 September. He also served as dean of the Faculty of Theology of the Argentine Catholic University.

On 18 February 1999, Maccarone was named bishop of Santiago del Estero. He was installed there on 29 May. He developed a good reputation as a political progressive and advocated for the federal government's intervention in the region. He attacked the local police and government officials for corruption He participated in the Dialogue Table sponsored by the Argentine episcopate during the crisis of 2001–2002 and frequently helped draft documents for the national bishops conference. Following the fall of the local Peronist Juárez regime, he supported federal intervention and he hosted Argentine President Néstor Kirchner and his wife Cristina on 25 May 2005, Argentina's national holiday, the first time the national celebration and Te Deum were held outside Buenos Aires.

== Resignation ==
In August 2005, a video showing Maccarone having sex with a 23-year-old man was made public. (Note: The man in question said he made the film on his own initiative because had failed to arrange a job for him as promised. He later said he had been "used" to harm Maccarone.) Maccarone did not dispute its authenticity. He said he was the victim of an extortion scheme, an act of political revenge, and suggested the involvement of Carlos Juárez, the powerful longterm local governor. He submitted his resignation on 19 August 2005 and Pope Benedict XVI accepted it the same day. The bishop of Santa Fe, José María Arancedo, praised his pastoral service as well as his prompt decision to resign. A spokesperson for the archbishop of Buenos Aires, Jorge Bergoglio, the future Pope Francis, supported the view that Maccarone was targeted for his politics, and supporters held marches in support of Maccarone. (Note: "Maccarone's predecessor as bishop, Gerardo Sueldo, also a fierce critic of the entrenched provincial regime, perished in a mysterious 1998 auto crash in which his car reportedly ran into a horse, though the animal's carcass never was found.") One human rights activist in Santiago del Estero said: "There is no way this occurred casually. If it happened to a person so loved, respected and as prestigious as the bishop, then it could happen to any of us."

Under orders from Pope Benedict, he lived a life of penance for a time in a Mexican monastery. He remained a bishop. By 2010 he had returned to Argentina and occasionally exercised his ministry at the request of a local bishop. He then returned to Argentina and continued to work as a priest in Claypole, Argentina, saying Mass for the nuns caring for handicapped children at the Cotolengo of Don Orione. He died there on 29 March 2015 at the age of 74.
