= Joaquín Mariano Sucunza =

Argentinian Roman Catholic prelate (born 1946)

Joaquín Mariano Sucunza (15 February 1946) is an Argentine prelate of the Roman Catholic Church. He has been auxiliary bishop of Buenos Aires since 2000.

== Life ==
Born in Pamplona, Spain, to a family of shepherds based in Lecumberri in the Navarra region on 15 February 1946, Sucunza moved with his family to Argentina, arriving on 11 December 1948. He completed all his studies for the priesthood at the Buenos Aires seminary. He was ordained to the priesthood on 27 November 1971. He fulfilled a series parish assignments over the next three decades and was named episcopal vicar for the central zone of Buenos Aires in 1998.

On 22 July 2000, Pope John Paul II appointed him auxiliary bishop of Buenos Aires and titular bishop of Saetabis. Sucunza received his episcopal consecration on the following 21 October from Jorge Mario Bergoglio, Archbishop of Buenos Aires (later Pope Francis), with Mario José Serra, Auxiliary Bishop of Buenos Aires, and Guillermo Leaden, Auxiliary Bishop Emeritus, serving as co-consecrators.

Bergoglio gave him increasing responsibility, naming him moderator of the curia on 12 December 2000, vicar general on 27 April 2002, and episcopal vicar for economic affairs on 3 June 2008.

He serves as head of the Economic Affairs Council of the Episcopal Conference of Argentina from 2017 to 2020.

He was vicar general of the Archdiocese when Archbishop Bergoglio was elected to the papacy, and the administrators of the archdiocese chose him to head the Archdiocese until Bergoglio named a successor. Sucunza reported that Pope Francis called him the day after his election and they spoke for 45 minutes. He quoted Francis as saying of the papal election: "When I saw that the number was already irreversible as the votes were counted, I imagined I was dying, ... a very rare thing, inside of me. When that brief moment passed, I felt different. I do not know what happened to me, but I felt different."

In addition to participating with the other Argentine bishops in ad limina visits with the pope, he had a personal visit with Pope Francis on 22 November 2018.
