= Manuel Tato =

Catholic bishop (1907–1980)

Manuel Tato (5 March 1907 – 12 August 1980) was a prelate of the Roman Catholic Church in Argentina. He served as auxiliary bishop of Buenos Aires from 1948 to 1961, when he became bishop of Santiago del Estero.

== Life ==
Born in Buenos Aires on 5 March 1907, Tato was ordained a priest on 21 December 1929.

On 12 November 1948, he was appointed auxiliary bishop of Buenos Aires and titular bishop of Aulon. Tato received his episcopal consecration on March 27, 1949 from Santiago Luis Cardinal Copello, archbishop of Buenos Aires, with the archbishop of Santa Fe, Nicolás Fasolino, and the auxiliary bishop of Buenos Aires, Antonio Rocca, serving as co-consecrators.

On 11 July 1961, he was appointed bishop of Santiago del Estero, where he was installed on 8 December.

As a bishop he was principal consecrator of Antonio María Aguirre, bishop of San Isidro, and Juan José Iriarte, archbishop of Rosario.

He died on 12 August 1980.
