= Diocese of Merlo-Moreno =

Catholic ecclesiastical territory

Diocese of Merlo-Moreno Dioecesis Merlensis-Morenensis Diócesis de Merlo-Moreno

Catholic
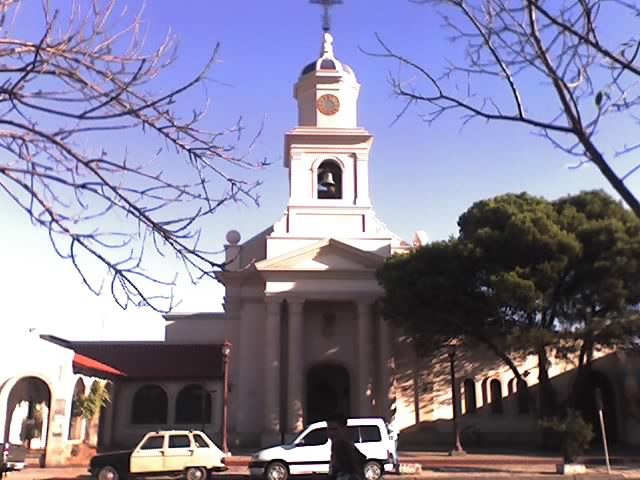
- Cathedral of Our Lady of the Rosary

Location
- Country: Argentina
- Ecclesiastical province: Mercedes-Luján
- Metropolitan: Mercedes-Luján

Statistics
- Area: 301 km^{2} (116 sq mi)
- Population: Total; Catholics: (as of 2004); 850,591; 701,737 (82.5%)

Information
- Denomination: Catholic
- Sui iuris church: Latin Church
- Rite: Roman Rite
- Established: 13 May 1997 (29 years ago)
- Cathedral: Parroquia Catedral Nuestra Señora del Rosario
- Patron saint: Our Lady of Guadalupe

Current leadership
- Pope: Leo XIV
- Bishop: Juan José Chaparro Stivanello, C.M.F.
- Metropolitan Archbishop: Jorge Eduardo Scheinig

Map
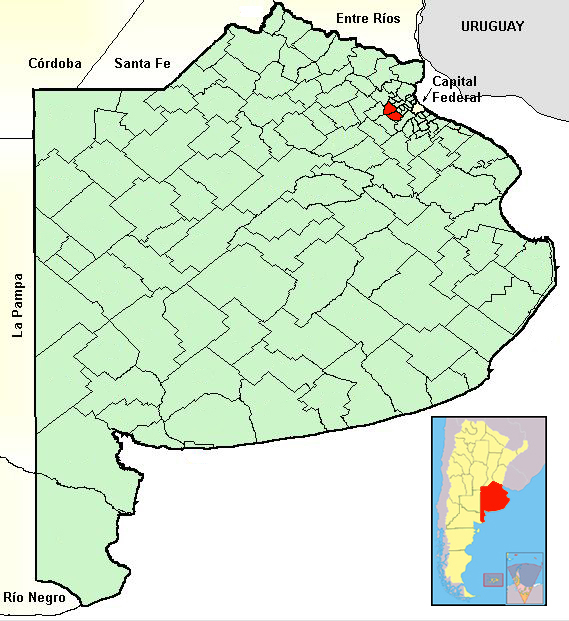

The Roman Catholic Diocese of Merlo-Moreno (erected 13 May 1997) is in Argentina and is a suffragan of the Archdiocese of Mercedes-Luján, having had change of metropolitan from Buenos Aires in 2019.

The patroness is the Blessed Virgin Mary of Guadalupe.

The partidos (departments) that fall into the diocese are Merlo and Moreno.

== Bishops ==
=== Ordinaries ===
- Fernando María Bargalló (1997–2012); he resigned and Bishop Emeritus Alcides Jorge Pedro Casaretto of San Isidro was named Apostolic Administrator ad nutum Sanctae Sedis by Pope Benedict XVI on Tuesday, 26 June 2012
- Fernando Carlos Maletti (2013–2022)
- Juan José Chaparro Stivanello, C.M.F. (2022– )

=== Auxiliary bishop ===
- Oscar Eduardo Miñarro (2016– )

=== Other priests of this diocese who became bishops ===
- Gabriel Bernardo Barba, appointed Bishop of Gregorio de Laferrere in 2013
- Fernando Miguel Gil Eisner, appointed Bishop of Salto, Uruguay in 2018

== External links and references ==
- Cathedral Parish of Our Lady of the Rosary – Cathedral of Merlo-Moreno (in Spanish)
- "Diocese of Merlo-Moreno". Catholic-Hierarchy.org. David M. Cheney. 20 October 2022.
