= Apostolic Vicariate of Northern Patagonia =

The Apostolic Vicariate of Northern Patagonia was a short-lived (1884-1904) pre-diocesan Latin Rite Catholic jurisdiction in Patagonia, southern Argentina. The see was in Viedma.

== History ==
- Established in 1884 as Apostolic Vicariate of Northern Patagonia / Patagoniæ Septentrionalis (Latin) / Patagonia Settentrionale (Curiate Italian) / Patagoniæ Septentrionalis (Latin adjective), on territory split off from the Metropolitan Archdiocese of Buenos Aires
- Suppressed in 1909, it was merged back into the Metropolitan Archdiocese of Buenos Aires.

No statistics available.

=== Episcopal Ordinary ===
Its only incumbent Apostolic Vicar of Northern Patagonia was :

- Giovanni Cagliero, Salesians (S.D.B.) (1884.09.30 – 1904.03.24), Titular Bishop of Magyddus (1884.10.30 – 1904.03.24); later papal diplomat : Titular Archbishop of Sebastea (1904.03.24 – 1915.12.06) as Apostolic Delegate to Costa Rica, Nicaragua and Honduras (1908.08.07 – retired 1915.12.06), created Cardinal-Priest of S. Bernardo alle Terme (1915.12.09 – 1920.12.16), promoted Cardinal-Bishop of Frascati (1920.12.16 – death 1926.02.28).

== See also ==
- List of Catholic dioceses in Argentina
- Apostolic Prefecture of Southern Patagonia
- Roman Catholic Diocese of Viedma

== Sources and external links ==
- GCatholic - data for all sections
