= Miguel Ángel D'Annibale =

Argentinian priest (1959–2020)

- Bishop of San Martín
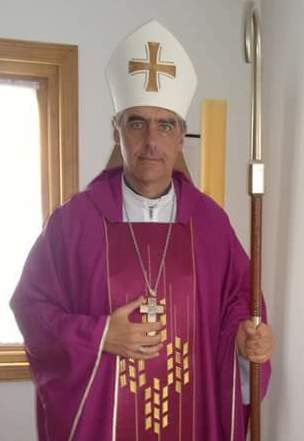
- D'Annibale in 2015
- Church: Catholic Church
- Diocese: Diocese of San Martín
- In office: 15 June 2018 – 14 April 2020
- Predecessor: Guillermo Rodríguez Melgarejo
- Successor: Martín Fassi
- Previous posts: Bishop of Río Gallegos (2013-2018); Apostolic Administrator of Río Gallegos (2012-2013); Titular Bishop of Nasai (2011-2013); Auxiliary Bishop of Río Gallegos (2011-2012)

Orders
- Ordination: 6 December 1985
- Consecration: 29 April 2011 by Jorge Casaretto

Personal details
- Born: 27 March 1959 Florida, Buenos Aires Province, Argentina
- Died: 14 April 2020 (aged 61) Buenos Aires, Argentina

Miguel Ángel D'Annibale (27 March 1959 – 14 April 2020) was an Argentine prelate of the Roman Catholic Church.

Born in Florida Este, Buenos Aires, D'Annibale was ordained to the priesthood in 1985. He later held the role of auxiliary bishop of Río Gallegos and was appointed titular bishop of Nasai in 2011. From 2013 until 2018, he served as bishop of Río Gallegos. From June 2018 until his death in 2020, D'Annibale was bishop of San Martín.

On 14 April 2020, D'Annibale died due to acute myeloid leukaemia in Buenos Aires. He was 61.
