= Apostolic Prefecture of Southern Patagonia =

The Apostolic Prefecture of Southern Patagonia was a short-lived (1884-1916) pre-diocesan Latin Catholic jurisdiction in Patagonia (notably Tierra del Fuego), i.e. southern Chile and Argentina.

== History ==
- Established in 1884 as Apostolic Prefecture of Southern Patagonia / Patagonia Meridionale (Curiate Italian) / Magallanes / Tierra del Fuego y Islas Malvinas (Spanish) / Magellanen(sis) (Latin adjective) / Patagoniæ Meridionalis (Latin), on territory split off from the Diocese of San Carlos de Ancud
- Suppressed on 1916.10.04, its territory being reassigned partly to the Metropolitan Archdiocese of Buenos Aires (Argentina) and partly to establish the Apostolic Vicariate of Magallanes y Islas Malvinas (now Diocese of Punta Arenas, Chile).

No statistics or incumbent(s) data available.

== See also ==
- List of Catholic dioceses in Argentina
- List of Catholic dioceses in Chile
- Apostolic Vicariate of Northern Patagonia

== Sources and external links ==
- GCatholic - data for all sections
