= Diocese of Río Gallegos =

Catholic ecclesiastical territory

Diocese of Río Gallegos Dioecesis Rivogallaecensis Diócesis de Río Gallegos

Catholic
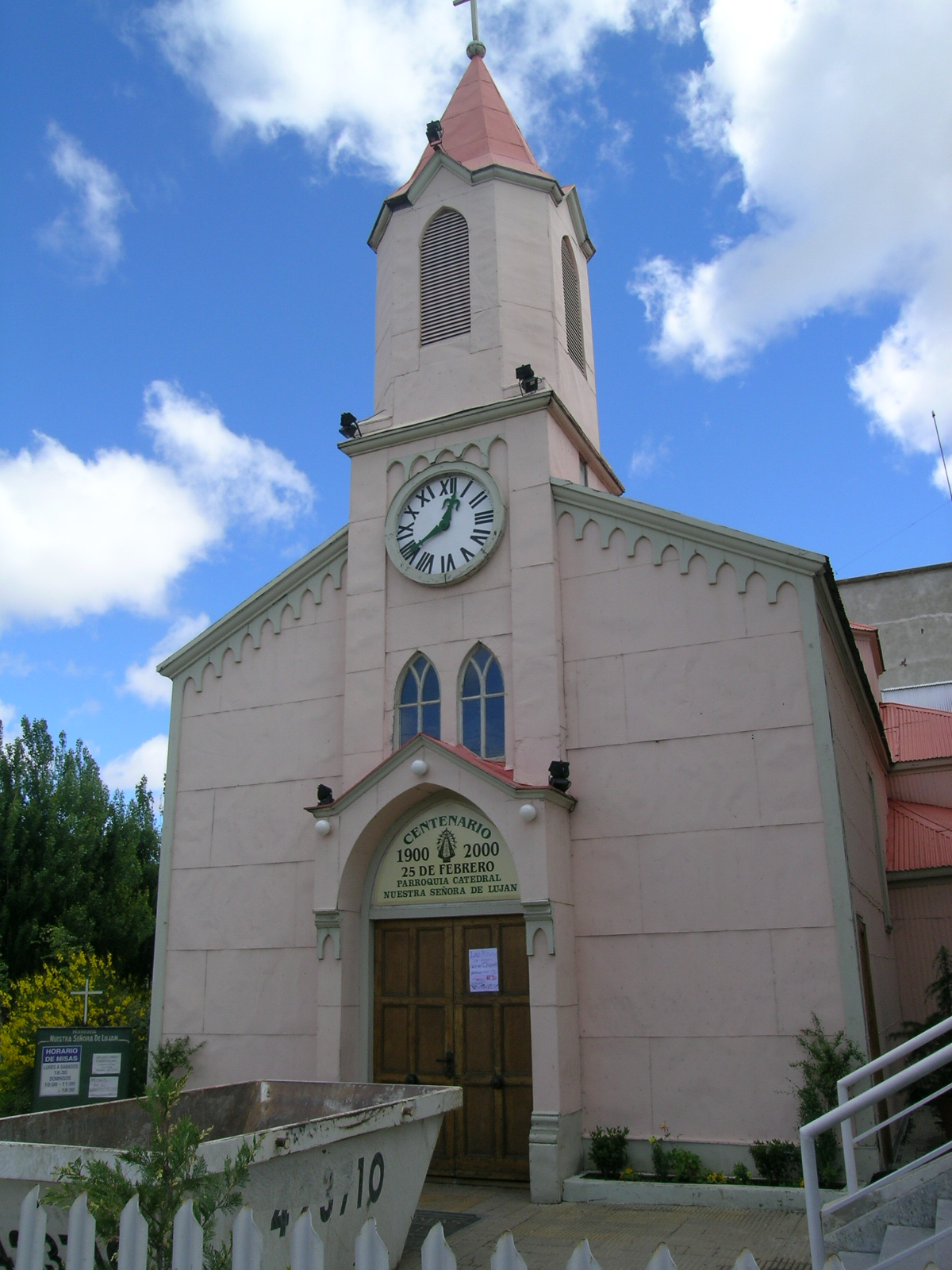
- Cathedral of Our Lady of Luján

Location
- Country: Argentina
- Ecclesiastical province: Bahía Blanca
- Metropolitan: Bahía Blanca
- Coordinates: 51.6228°S 69.2170°W

Statistics
- Area: 265,614 km^{2} (102,554 sq mi)
- Population: Total; Catholics: (as of 2010); 303,000; 212,000 (70%)
- Parishes: 30

Information
- Denomination: Catholic
- Sui iuris church: Latin Church
- Rite: Roman Rite
- Established: 10 April 1961 (65 years ago)
- Cathedral: Cathedral of Our Lady of Lujan in Río Gallegos, Santa Cruz

Current leadership
- Pope: Leo XIV
- Bishop: Ignacio Damián Medina
- Metropolitan Archbishop: Carlos Alfonso Azpiroz Costa
- Bishops emeritus: Juan Carlos Romanin, SDB

The Roman Catholic Diocese of Río Gallegos is located in the city of Río Gallegos, which is the capital of the Patagonia region of Santa Cruz, Argentina.

== Size ==
The Diocese, according to the Vatican Information Service (VIS), has an area of 265,614 square miles, a total population of 300,000, a Catholic population of 210,000, 55 priests, 9 permanent deacons, and 94 religious.

== History ==
It was erected in 1961, and was formed from the Diocese of Comodoro Rivadavia, Argentina. It is a suffragan see of the Archdiocese of Bahia Blanca, Argentina.

== Bishops ==
Ordinaries

- Mauricio Eugenio Magliano, S.D.B.(1961–1974)
- Miguel Angel Alemán Eslava, S.D.B.(1975–1992)
- Alejandro Antonio Buccolini, S.D.B. (1992–2005)
- Juan Carlos Romanin, S.D.B. (2005–2012)
- Miguel Ángel D’Annibale (2013–2018), appointed Bishop of San Martín
- Jorge García Cuerva (2019-2023)
- Ignacio Damián Medina (2023 – present)

Auxiliary bishop

- Miguel Ángel D’Annibale (2011-2013), appointed Bishop here
