= Juan Horacio Suárez =

Argentine Roman Catholic bishop (born 1938)

- Bishop Emeritus of Gregorio de Laferrere
- Church: Catholic Church
- Diocese: Diocese of Gregorio de Laferrere
- In office: 25 November 2000 – 19 December 2013
- Predecessor: Diocese erected
- Successor: Gabriel Bernardo Barba

Orders
- Ordination: 2 December 1967
- Consecration: 23 December 2000 by Santos Abril y Castelló

Personal details
- Born: 12 March 1938 (age 88) Villa Nueva, Córdoba Province, Argentina

Juan Horacio Suárez (born 12 March 1938 in Villa Nueva) is an Argentine Roman Catholic bishop.

Ordained to the priesthood on 2 December 1967, Suárez was named bishop of the Roman Catholic Diocese of Gregorio de Laferrere, Argentina on 25 November 2000 and retired on 19 December 2013. After retirement he became a priest at the San José parish, in the town of Villa María.
