= Diocese of Santa Rosa in Argentina =

Catholic ecclesiastical territory

Diocese of Santa Rosa in Argentina Dioecesis Sanctae Rosae in Argentina Diócesis de Santa Rosa

Catholic
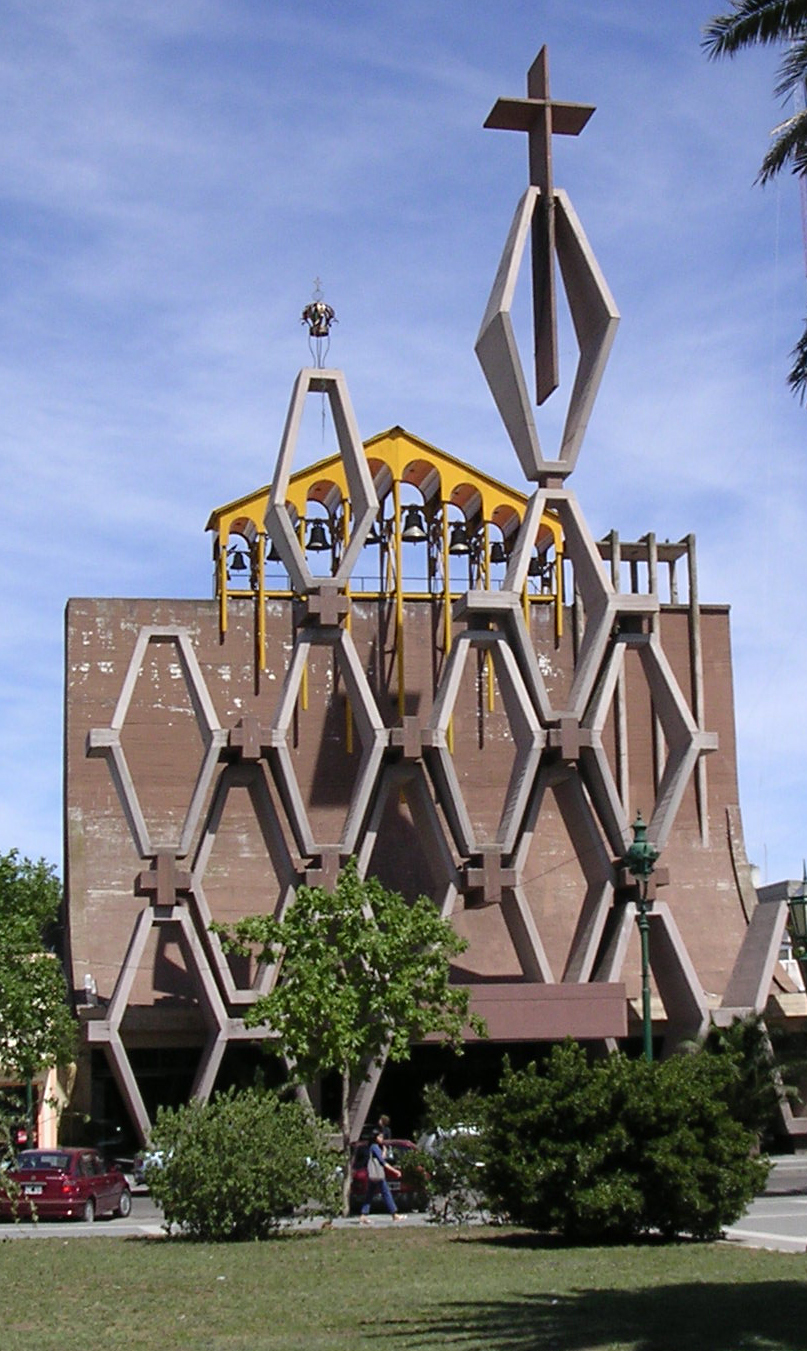
- Cathedral of St. Rose of Lima

Location
- Country: Argentina
- Ecclesiastical province: Bahía Blanca
- Metropolitan: Bahía Blanca

Statistics
- Area: 143,440 km^{2} (55,380 sq mi)
- Population: Total; Catholics: (as of 2010); 341,456; 169,000 (49.5%)
- Parishes: 26

Information
- Denomination: Roman Catholic
- Rite: Roman Rite
- Established: 11 February 1957 (69 years ago)
- Cathedral: Cathedral of St Rose of Lima in Santa Rosa, La Pampa
- Patron saint: St Rose of Lima

Current leadership
- Pope: Leo XIV
- Bishop: Luis Darío Martín
- Metropolitan Archbishop: Carlos Alfonso Azpiroz Costa
- Bishops emeritus: Rinaldo Fidel Brédice

Website
- Website of the Diocese

The Roman Catholic Diocese of Santa Rosa in Argentina is located in the city of Santa Rosa, La Pampa, Argentina. It was established by Pope Pius XII on 11 February 1957, and is a suffragan diocese in the province of Bahía Blanca.

== Bishops ==
=== Ordinaries ===
- Jorge Mayer (1957–1972), appointed Archbishop of Bahía Blanca
- Adolfo Roque Esteban Arana (1973–1984), appointed Bishop of Río Cuarto
- Atilano Vidal Núñez (1985–1991)
- Rinaldo Fidel Brédice (1992–2008)
- Mario Aurelio Poli (2008–2013), appointed Archbishop of Buenos Aires (Cardinal in 2014)
- Raúl Martín (2013–2025), appointed Archbishop of Paranà
- Luis Darío Martín (2026–Present)
