= Raúl Omar Rossi =

Catholic bishop (1938–2003)

- Bishop of San Martín
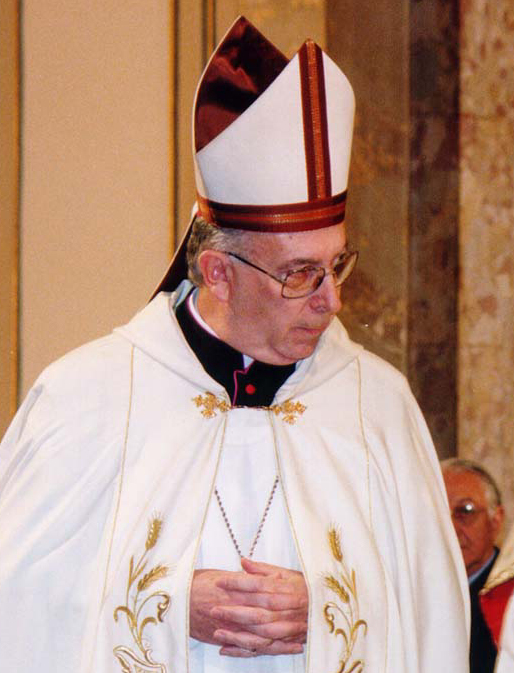
- Church: Catholic Church
- Diocese: Diocese of San Martín
- In office: 22 February 2000 – 2 February 2003
- Predecessor: Luis Héctor Villalba
- Successor: Guillermo Rodríguez Melgarejo
- Previous posts: Titular Bishop of Enera (1992-2000); Auxiliary Bishop of Buenos Aires (1992-2000)

Orders
- Ordination: 3 December 1966
- Consecration: 27 June 1992 by Antonio Quarracino

Personal details
- Born: 13 August 1938 Gualeguaychú, Entre Ríos Province, Argentina
- Died: 2 February 2003 (aged 64)

Raúl Omar Rossi (August 13, 1938 – February 2, 2003) was a prelate of the Roman Catholic Church. He served as auxiliary bishop of Buenos Aires from 1992 till 2000, when he became bishop of San Martín.

== Life ==
Born in Gualeguaychú, Rossi was ordained to the priesthood on December 3, 1966.

On May 20, 1992, he was appointed auxiliary bishop of Buenos Aires and titular bishop of Enera. Rossi received his episcopal consecration on the following June 27, together with the future Pope Francis, who was also consecrated a bishop at that time, from Antonio Cardinal Quarracino, archbishop of Buenos Aires, with the auxiliary bishop of Buenos Aires, Mario José Serra, and the auxiliary bishop of Buenos Aires, Eduardo Vicente Mirás, serving as co-consecrators.

On February 22, 2000, he was appointed bishop of San Martín, where he was installed on the following May 1.

He died on 2 February 2003.
