= Rinaldo Fidel Brédice =

Argentine Roman Catholic bishop

- Bishop of Santa Rosa
- Church: Catholic Church
- Diocese: Diocese of Santa Rosa
- In office: 31 January 1992 – 24 June 2008
- Predecessor: Atilano Vidal Núñez
- Successor: Mario Aurelio Poli

Orders
- Ordination: 22 December 1956 by Antonio Caggiano
- Consecration: 19 March 1992 by Rómulo García

Personal details
- Born: 11 September 1932 Armstrong, Santa Fe Province, Argentina
- Died: 14 April 2018 (aged 85) Intendente Alvear, La Pampa Province, Argentina

Rinaldo Fidel Brédice (11 September 1932 – 14 April 2018) was an Argentine Roman Catholic bishop.

Brédice was born in Argentina and was ordained to the priesthood in 1956. He served as bishop of the Roman Catholic Diocese of Santa Rosa in Argentina from 1992 to 2008.
