= Guillermo Leaden =

His Excellency, The Most Reverend Guillermo Leaden, S.D.B.
- Auxiliary Bishop Archdiocese of Buenos Aires (Emeritus)
- Church: Roman Catholic Church
- See: Archdiocese of Buenos Aires
- In office: 1954 – 1989
- Previous post: Priest

Orders
- Ordination: November 23, 1941

Personal details
- Born: July 20, 1913 Buenos Aires, Argentina
- Died: July 14, 2014 (aged 100) Buenos Aires, Argentina

Guillermo Leaden, S.D.B. (July 20, 1913 – July 14, 2014) was an Argentine bishop of the Roman Catholic Church. At the age of 100, he was one of the oldest bishops in the Church and the oldest Argentine bishop.

== Life ==
Leaden was born in Buenos Aires, Argentina in 1913. He was ordained a priest of the Roman Catholic religious institute of the Salesians of Don Bosco in November 1941. After this, he worked as a teacher in Buenos Aires. In 1969, he was appointed episcopal vicar of Belgrano.

On May 28, 1975, he was appointed Titular Bishop of Theudalis and Auxiliary Bishop of Buenos Aires and was ordained August 8, 1975. In 1976, a few months into the Dictatorship, his brother Alfredo was assassinated in the Palottino Massacre. Pope Francis recently launched the cause for Alfredo's beatification. On April 10, 1992, Leaden retired from all his posts. After his retirement, Leaden still lived in Buenos Aires, where he died a few days before his 101st birthday.
