= Mario Aurelio Poli =

Argentine Catholic Cardinal (born 1947)

His Eminence Mario Aurelio Poli
- Cardinal, Archbishop Emeritus of Buenos Aires
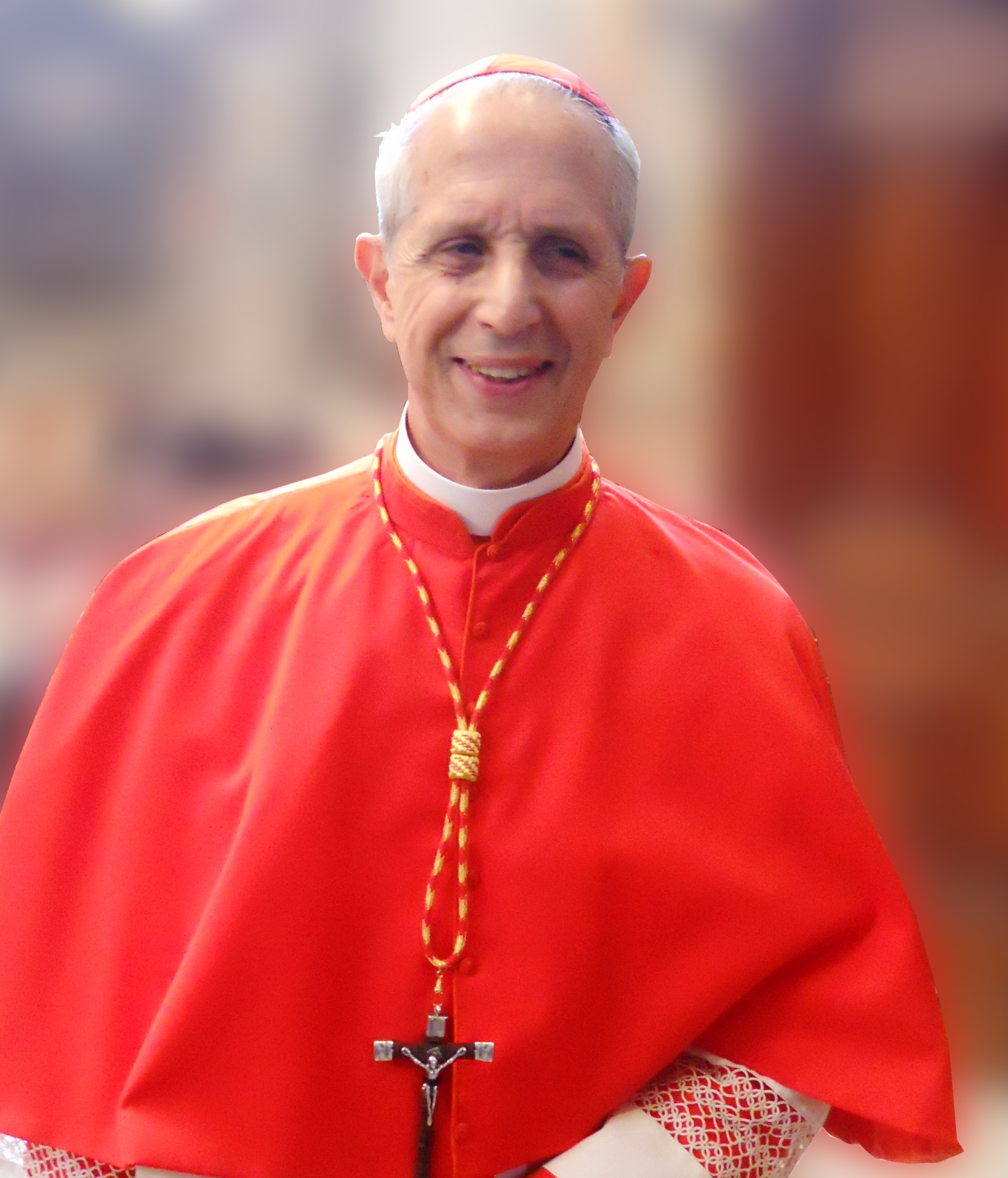
- Poli in 2014
- Archdiocese: Buenos Aires
- Metropolis: Buenos Aires
- See: Buenos Aires
- Appointed: 28 March 2013
- Installed: 20 April 2013
- Term ended: 26 May 2023
- Predecessor: Jorge Mario Bergoglio
- Successor: Jorge García Cuerva
- Other posts: Cardinal-Priest of San Roberto Bellarmino; Ordinary of the Ordinariate for the Faithful of Eastern Rite in Argentina
- Previous posts: Auxiliary Bishop of Buenos Aires (2002–2008); Titular Bishop of Abidda (2002–2008); Bishop of Santa Rosa (2008–2013)

Orders
- Ordination: 25 November 1978 by Juan Carlos Aramburu
- Consecration: 20 April 2002 by Jorge Mario Bergoglio
- Created cardinal: 22 February 2014 by Pope Francis
- Rank: Cardinal-Priest

Personal details
- Born: 29 November 1947 (age 78) Buenos Aires, Argentina
- Denomination: Roman Catholic
- Motto: Concédeme, Señor, un corazón que escuche (Lord, give me a listening heart)
- Coat of arms

Ordination history of Mario Aurelio Poli
History
Episcopal consecration
- Principal consecrator: Jorge Bergoglio
- Co-consecrators: Juan Carlos Aramburu; Mario Jose Serra; Joaquin Mariano Sucunza; Guillermo Rodríguez-Malgarejo
Cardinalate
- Elevated by: Pope Francis
Episcopal succession
Bishops consecrated by Mario Aurelio Poli as principal consecrator
- Víctor Manuel Fernández: 15 June 2013
- Alejandro Daniel Giorgi: 3 May 2014
- Ernesto Giobando: 3 May 2014
- Juan Carlos Ares: 26 December 2014
- José María Baliña: 28 February 2015

Styles of Mario Aurelio Poli
- Reference style: His Eminence
- Spoken style: Your Eminence
- Religious style: Cardinal
- Informal style: Cardinal

Mario Aurelio Poli (Spanish pronunciation: [ˈmaɾjo awˈɾeljo ˈpoli]; born 29 November 1947) is an Argentine prelate of the Catholic Church who was the Archbishop of Buenos Aires from 2013 to 2023. He was the Bishop of Santa Rosa from 2008 to 2013 and before that an auxiliary bishop in Buenos Aires from 2002 to 2008. Pope Francis, his predecessor in Buenos Aires, made him a cardinal in 2014.

== Early life and career ==
Mario Poli was born in Buenos Aires in 1947 as a son of Italian immigrants. He began his philosophical and theological studies in 1969 at the Inmaculada Concepción Seminary in Villa Devoto. He obtained his bachelor's degree in social services at the University of Buenos Aires and his doctor of theology degree at the Pontifical Catholic University of Argentina. Poli was ordained a priest by Cardinal Juan Carlos Aramburu on 25 November 1978, and led the Parish of San Cayetano in Liniers for two years.

In 1992, the Cardinal Archbishop of Buenos Aires Antonio Quarracino appointed him Director of the Vocational Institute "Saint Joseph", a place of formation of future priests.

He was professor of ecclesiastical history and patrology at the Argentine Catholic University.

== Bishop ==
Pope John Paul II appointed him auxiliary bishop of Buenos Aires on 8 February 2002, and Pope Benedict XVI appointed him Bishop of Santa Rosa on 24 June 2008.

Poli opposed same-sex marriage in Argentina and in 2013 said that he would have a respectful but distant relationship with the administration of Argentine President Cristina Fernández de Kirchner, a political stance similar to that of Bergoglio. and called for increased dialogue between the church and the state.

News of his appointment as archbishop of Buenos Aires was leaked to the press on 27 March 2013, two weeks after the post became vacant upon the election of Jorge Bergoglio to the papacy as Pope Francis. The leak was an embarrassment for Church officials. The Vatican announced Poli's appointment on 28 March and he was installed on 20 April at the Buenos Aires Metropolitan Cathedral. He received the pallium from Pope Francis in Rome on 29 June 2013.

== Cardinal ==
Poli was made a cardinal in the consistory of 22 February 2014 with the rank of Cardinal-Priest of San Roberto Bellarmino, the same titular assignment held by Pope Francis.

On 19 February 2014 he was appointed a member of the Congregation for the Oriental Churches and Pontifical Council for the Laity.

Poli delivered the homily for the Mass at the Buenos Aires Metropolitan Cathedral for the 2014 First National Government holiday. Poli quoted Francis and requested more political dialogue.

Pope Francis accepted his resignation as archbishop of Buenos Aires on 26 May 2023.

Poli remained Ordinary for Catholics of the Eastern rites in Argentina until his resignation was accepted in November 2023.

Poli participated as a cardinal elector in the 2025 papal conclave that elected Pope Leo XIV.

== See also ==
- Cardinals created by Francis

Catholic Church titles
Preceded by Rinaldo Fidel Brédice	Bishop of Santa Rosa; 24 June 2008 – 28 March 2013	Succeeded by Raúl Martín
Preceded by Jorge Mario Bergoglio	Archbishop of Buenos Aires; 28 March 2013 – 26 May 2023	Succeeded by Jorge Ignacio García Cuerva
Preceded by Jorge Mario Bergoglio	Ordinary of Argentina of the Eastern Rite; 4 May 2013 – present	Incumbent
Preceded by Jorge Mario Bergoglio	Cardinal-Priest of San Roberto Bellarmino; 22 February 2014 – present	Incumbent
