= Diocese of San Carlos de Bariloche =

Catholic ecclesiastical territory

Diocese of San Carlos de Bariloche Dioecesis Sancti Caroli Vurilocensis Diócesis de San Carlos de Bariloche

Catholic
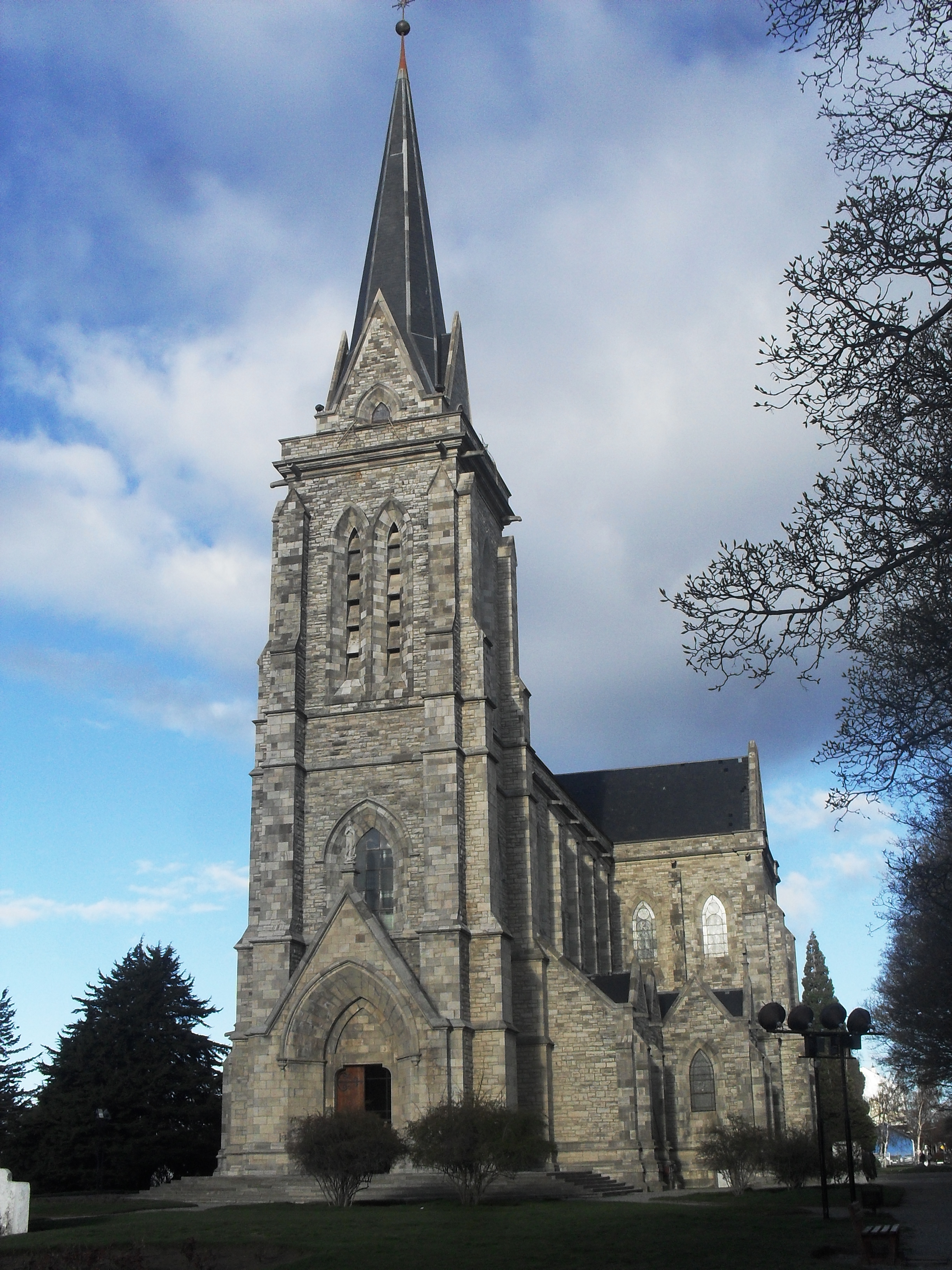
- Catedral Nuestra Señora del Nahuel Huapi

Location
- Country: Argentina
- Ecclesiastical province: Bahía Blanca
- Metropolitan: Bahía Blanca

Statistics
- Area: 77,076 km^{2} (29,759 sq mi)
- Population: Total; Catholics: (as of 2010); 171,000; 120,000 (70.2%)
- Parishes: 19

Information
- Denomination: Roman Catholic
- Rite: Roman Rite
- Established: 22 July 1993 (33 years ago)
- Cathedral: Cathedral of Our Lady of Nahuel Huapi in San Carlos de Bariloche
- Patron saint: Our Lady of the Snows; St Charles Borromeo

Current leadership
- Pope: Leo XIV
- Bishop: Juan Carlos Ares
- Metropolitan Archbishop: Carlos Alfonso Azpiroz Costa

The Roman Catholic Diocese of San Carlos de Bariloche is based in the city of San Carlos de Bariloche, usually referred to as Bariloche, in the province of Río Negro, Argentina. The diocese is a suffragan of the province of Bahia Blanca. The city is located in the foothills of the Andes.

== Ordinaries ==
- Rubén Oscar Frassia (1993–2000), appointed Bishop of Avellaneda
- Fernando Carlos Maletti (2001–2013), appointed Bishop of Merlo-Moreno
- Juan José Chaparro Stivanello, C.M.F. (2013–2022), appointed Bishop of Merlo-Moreno
- Juan Carlos Ares (2023–Present)
