= Archdiocese of Santiago del Estero =

Catholic ecclesiastical territory

Archdiocese of Santiago del Estero Archidioecesis Sancti Iacobi de Estero Arquidiócesis de Santiago del Estero

Catholic
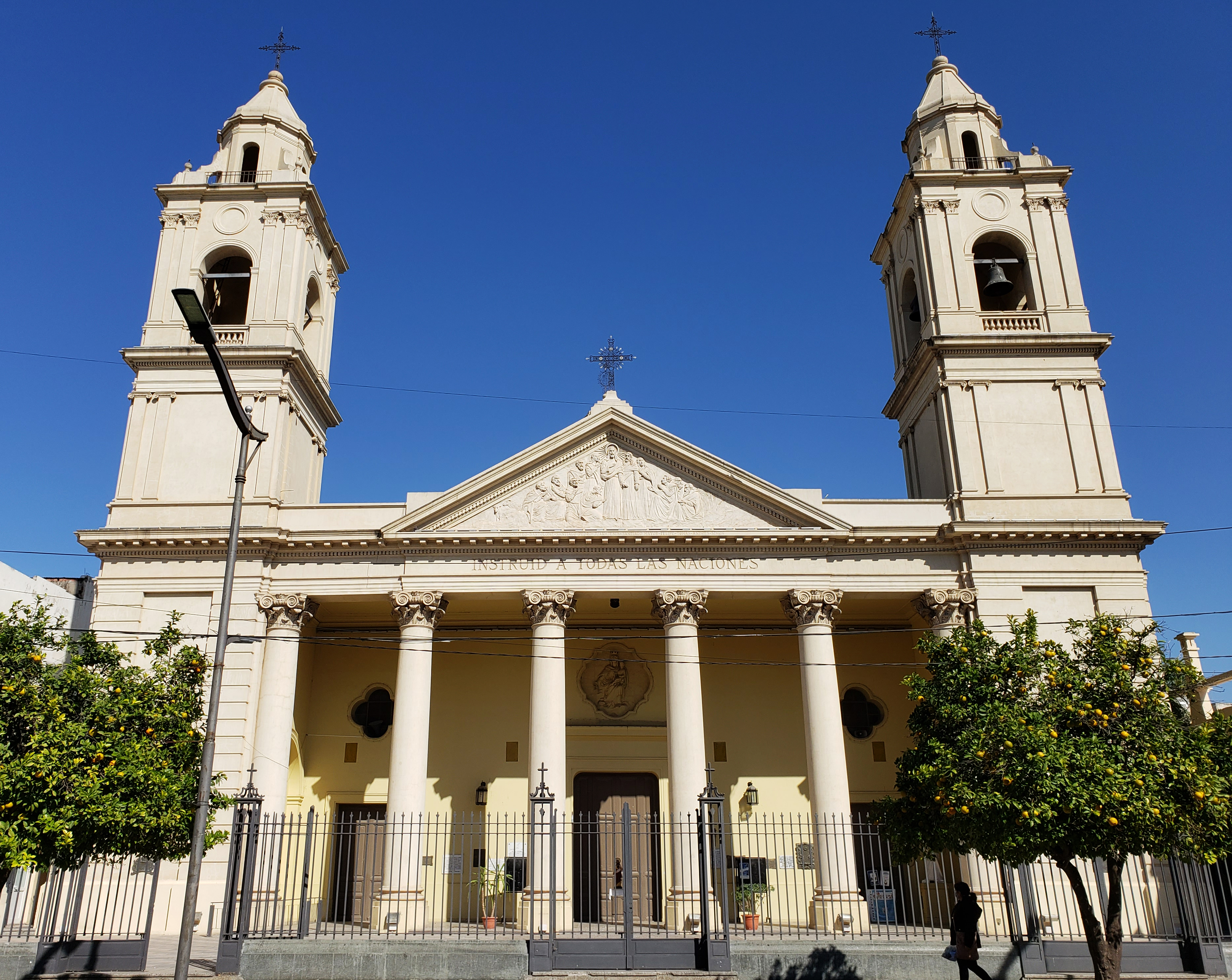
- Cathedral Basilica of Our Lady of Mount Carmel

Location
- Country: Argentina
- Ecclesiastical province: Tucumán
- Metropolitan: Tucumán

Statistics
- Area: 81,969 km^{2} (31,648 sq mi)
- Population: Total; Catholics: (as of 2010); 686,000; 605,000 (88.2%)
- Parishes: 44

Information
- Denomination: Catholic
- Rite: Roman Rite
- Established: 25 March 1907 (revived)
- Cathedral: Cathedral Basilica of Our Lady of Mount Carmel
- Patron saint: St James the Greater; Our Lady of Consolation Sumampa

Current leadership
- Pope: Leo XIV
- Archbishop: Vicente Bokalic Iglic
- Metropolitan Archbishop: Carlos Alberto Sánchez
- Auxiliary Bishops: Enrique Alberto Martínez Ossola
- Bishops emeritus: Francisco Polti Santillán

Website
- www.obispadosgo.org.ar

The Archdiocese of Santiago del Estero (Latin: Archidioecesis Sancti Iacobi de Estero) is a Latin Catholic jurisdiction of the Catholic Church in northern Argentina and the first diocese on territory belonging to the modern Republic of Argentina. Formerly a diocese in the ecclesiastical province of Tucumán, it continues to be a suffragan see of the Archdiocese of Tucumán even after the elevation to the status of an archdiocese and its recognition as the Primacy of Argentina in 2024.

== History ==
On 14 May 1570, Pope Pius V erected the Diocese of Tucumán, the first Catholic diocese on territory belonging to the modern Republic of Argentina, assigning it the territory of the Royal Audience of Charcas, an administrative district created in 1563 and taken from the jurisdiction of Chile. This diocese had its seat at the Church of St. Peter and St. Paul in Santiago del Estero, the oldest city in modern Argentina.

In 1699, Pope Innocent XII moved the episcopal seat of this diocese to the city of Córdoba, ending Santiago del Estero's role as an episcopal seat. (Note: The territory of Santiago del Estero was eventually assigned to two other diocese in the course of the reorganization of ecclesiastical jurisdictions, first to the Diocese of Salta upon its creation by Pope Pius VII in 1806 and then to the Diocese of Tucumán when Pope Leo XIII created it in 1897.)

Finally, Santiago del Estero became an episcopal seat again on 25 March 1907, when Pope Pius X erected the Diocese of Santiago del Estero covering the entire province of that name, territory taken from the Diocese of Tucumán and made a suffragan of the Archdiocese of Buenos Aires.

In 1934, the Diocese of Santiago del Estero was made a suffragan of the Archdiocese of Santa Fe. In 1957, it was made a suffragan of the Archdiocese of Tucumán.

The Diocese of Santiago del Estero lost territory to the Diocese of Añatuya when that diocese was created in 1961.

On 22 July 2024, Pope Francis elevated the diocese to the status of an archdiocese, while continuing to designate it a suffragan of the Archdiocese of Tucumán. At the same time, in recognition of Santiago del Estero's history as the episcopal seat of the first diocese erected on the territory of contemporary Argentina, Francis transferred the title of "Primate of Argentina" to the archbishop of Santiago del Estero. That title had been assigned pro tempore on 29 January 1936 to the archbishop of Buenos Aires by the decree of the Sacred Congregation of the Consistory Cum Ecclesiastica Provincia Bonaerensis. In a joint statement, Jorge Ignacio García Cuerva, Archbishop of Buenos Aires, and Vicente Bokalic Iglic, now the Archbishop of Santiago del Estero, noted the title carried no authority and was "honorific", but they said the change "redressed a major grievance in ecclesiastical history".

== Leadership ==
Bishops

- Juan Martín Yáñez (1910–1926)
- Audino Rodríguez y Olmos (1927–1939), appointed archbishop of San Juan de Cuyo
- José Weimann, C.Ss.R. (1940–1961)
- Manuel Tato (1961–1980)
- Manuel Guirao (1981–1994)
- Gerardo Eusebio Sueldo (1994–1998)
- Juan Carlos Maccarone (1999 – 2005)
- Francisco Polti Santillán (2006–2013)
- Vicente Bokalic Iglic (2013 – 2024)

Archbishops

- Vicente Bokalic Iglic (2024 – present)

Coadjutor bishops

- Gerardo Eusebio Sueldo (1993–1994)

Auxiliary bishops

- Ariel Edgardo Torrado Mosconi (2008 – 2015), appointed Coadjutor Bishop of Nueve de Julio
- Enrique Alberto Martínez Ossola (2017-present)

== Statistics ==
As of 2022, it served 728,824 Catholics (90% of 809,804 total) on 72,273 km^{2} in 45 parishes with 53 priests (38 diocesan, 15 religious), 73 lay religious (20 brothers, 53 sisters) and 13 permanent deacons.
