= Guillermo Rodríguez Melgarejo =

Argentinian priest (1943–2021)

Guillermo Rodríguez-Melgarejo
- Bishop of San Martín
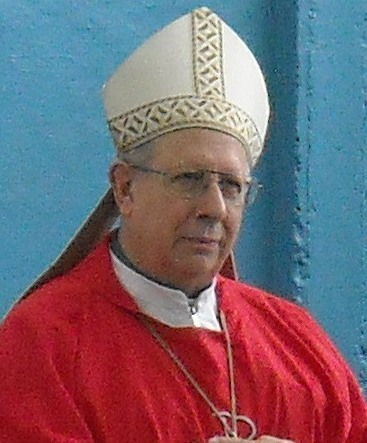
- Rodríguez-Melgarejo in 2010
- Church: Catholic Church
- Diocese: Diocese of San Martín
- In office: 30 May 2003 – 15 June 2018
- Predecessor: Raúl Omar Rossi
- Successor: Miguel Ángel D'Annibale
- Previous posts: Titular Bishop of Ucres (1994-2003); Auxiliary Bishop of Buenos Aires (1994-2003)

Orders
- Ordination: 23 May 1970
- Consecration: 27 September 1994 by Antonio Quarracino

Personal details
- Born: 20 May 1943 Buenos Aires, Argentina
- Died: 4 July 2021 (aged 78)

Guillermo Rodríguez Melgarejo (20 May 1943 – 4 January 2021) was an Argentine Roman Catholic bishop.

Melgarejo was born in Argentina and was ordained to the priesthood in 1970. He served as titular bishop of Ucres and as auxiliary bishop of the Roman Catholic Archdiocese of Buenos Aires from 1994 to 2003 and as bishop of the Roman Catholic Diocese of San Martín in Argentina from 2003 to 2018.
