= Diocese of San Martín in Argentina =

Catholic ecclesiastical territory

Diocese of San Martín Dioecesis Foromartiniensis Diócesis de San Martín

Catholic
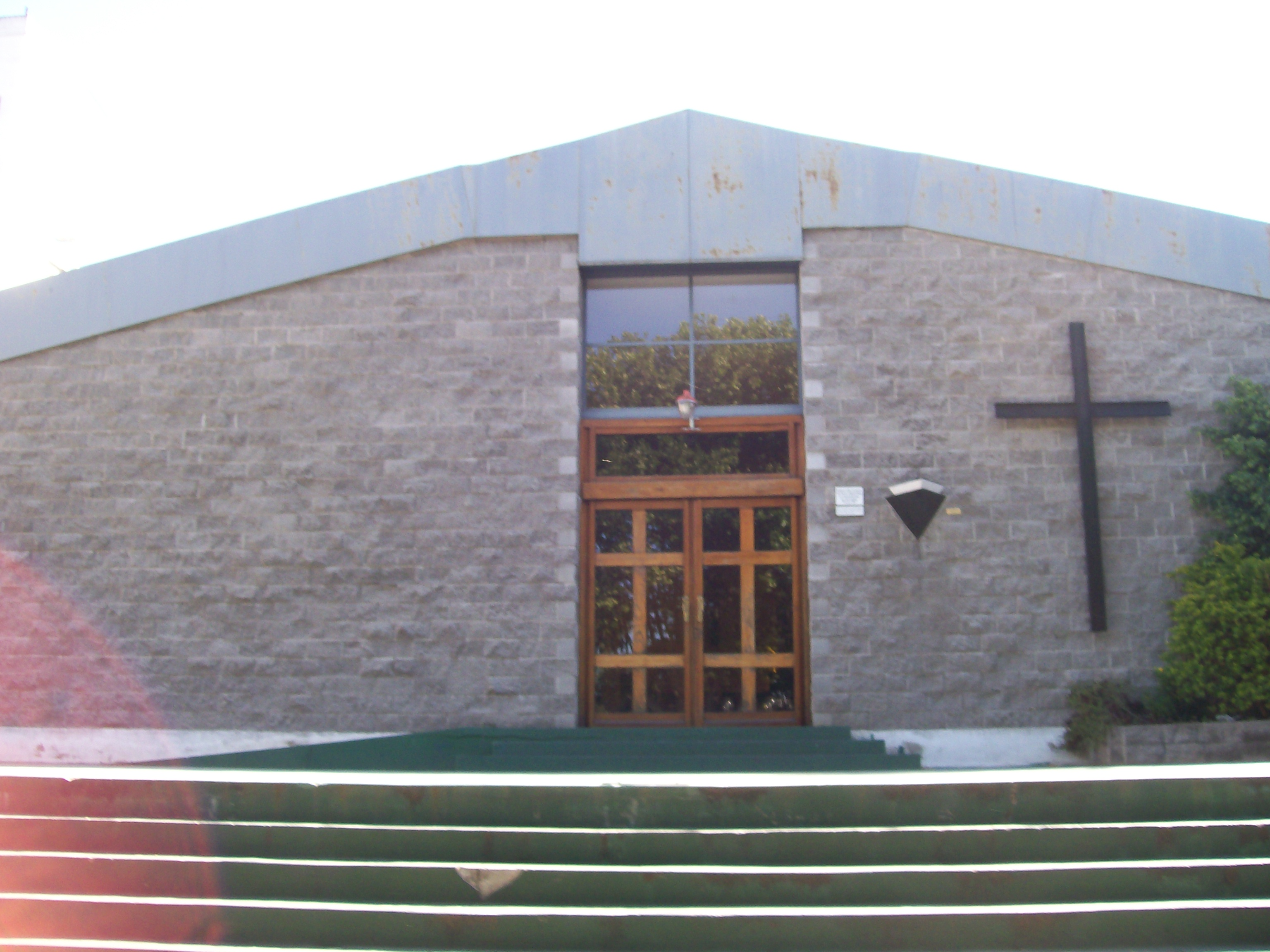
- Cathedral of Jesus the Shepherd

Location
- Country: Argentina
- Ecclesiastical province: Buenos Aires
- Metropolitan: Buenos Aires

Statistics
- Area: 102 km^{2} (39 sq mi)
- Population: Total; Catholics: (as of 2010); 769,000; 538,000 (70%)
- Parishes: 37

Information
- Denomination: Roman Catholic
- Rite: Roman Rite
- Established: 10 April 1961 (65 years ago)
- Cathedral: Cathedral of Christ the Good Shepherd in San Martín
- Patron saint: St Joseph the Worker; Our Lady of Lourdes

Current leadership
- Pope: Leo XIV
- Bishop: Martín Fassi
- Metropolitan Archbishop: Mario Aurelio Poli
- Auxiliary Bishops: Ham Lim Moon

The Roman Catholic Diocese of San Martín is located in the city of San Martín, Buenos Aires, Argentina. It was established by Saint John XXIII on 10 April 1961.

== Bishops ==
=== Ordinaries ===
- Manuel Menéndez (bishop) (1961–1991)
- Luis Héctor Villalba (1991–1999), appointed Archbishop of Tucumán; future Cardinal
- Raúl Omar Rossi (2000–2003)
- Guillermo Rodríguez Melgarejo (2003–2018)
- Miguel Ángel D’Annibale (2018-2020)
- Martín Fassi (2020-

=== Auxiliary bishops ===
- Horacio Alberto Bózzoli (1973-1975), appointed Auxiliary Bishop of Buenos Aires
- Han Lim Moon (2014-
