= Archdiocese of Buenos Aires =

Latin Catholic archdiocese in Argentina

Metropolitan Archdiocese of Buenos Aires Archidioecesis Metropolitae Bonaerensis Arquidiócesis Metropolitana de Buenos Aires

Catholic
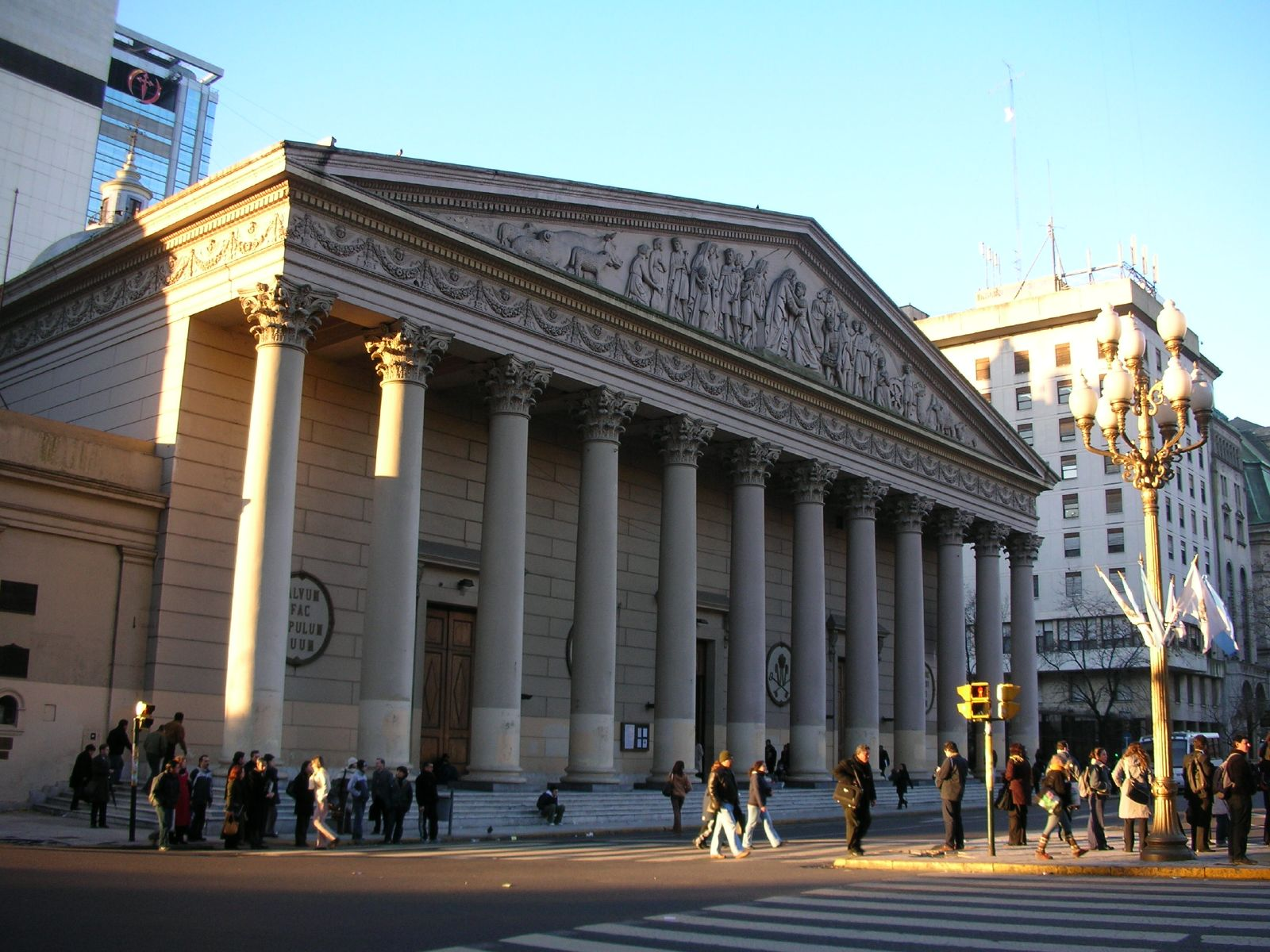
- Buenos Aires Metropolitan Cathedral

Location
- Country: Argentina
- Territory: Buenos Aires
- Ecclesiastical province: Buenos Aires

Statistics
- Area: 78 sq mi (200 km^{2})
- Population: Total; Catholics: (as of 2012); 2,917,000; 2,671,000 (91.6%)
- Parishes: 186

Information
- Denomination: Catholic Church
- Sui iuris church: Latin Church
- Rite: Roman Rite
- Established: 6 April 1620
- Cathedral: Buenos Aires Metropolitan Cathedral
- Patron saint: Nuestra Señora del Buen Aire
- Secular priests: 471

Current leadership
- Pope: Leo XIV
- Archbishop: Jorge Ignacio García Cuerva
- Auxiliary Bishops: Pedro Bernardo Cannavó; Sergio Iván Dornelles; Alejandro Daniel Giorgi; Alejandro Daniel Pardo; Joaquín Mariano Sucunza
- Bishops emeritus: Mario Aurelio Poli

Map

Website
- arzbaires.org.ar

The Metropolitan Archdiocese of Buenos Aires (Archidioecesis Metropolitae Bonaerensis) is a Latin Church ecclesiastical territory or archdiocese of the Catholic Church in Argentina. It is a metropolitan archdiocese with 13 suffragan sees in the country, including two Eastern Catholic eparchies.

The Metropolitan Archbishopric of Buenos Aires was the Primatial see (protocollary first-rank) of Argentina, although the incumbent Metropolitan may be outranked by Cardinals or more senior ones. On 13 March 2013, Cardinal Archbishop Jorge Mario Bergoglio was elected pope, taking the name of Francis. On 22 July 2024, the primatial see of Argentina was transferred to the Archdiocese of Santiago del Estero. The current archbishop, since 26 May 2023, is Jorge Ignacio García Cuerva.

== Statistics and extent ==
At the beginning of the twentieth century, Buenos Aires was the second largest Catholic city in the world after Paris. In 2014 the Archdiocese pastorally served 2,721,000 Catholics (91.6% of 2,971,000 total) in an area of 205 km^{2} in 186 parishes and 183 missions with 783 priests (456 diocesan, 327 religious), 11 deacons, 1,915 lay religious (477 brothers, 1,438 sisters) and 53 seminarians. It is divided into the four zonal vicaries—Flores, Devoto, Belgrano and Centro—which are further subdivided into 20 deaconates.

== Special churches ==
- Its cathedral mother church is the Buenos Aires Metropolitan Cathedral, dedicated to the Holy Trinity, in the autonomous city of Buenos Aires, the national capital of Argentina.
- It also has the following Minor basilicas, all in the metropolitan Buenos Aires area: Basílica de Nuestra Señora de Buenos Aires, Basílica de Nuestra Señora de la Merced, Buenos Aires, Basílica de Nuestra Señora de la Piedad, Basílica de Nuestra Señora del Pilar, Basílica de Nuestra Señora del Rosario, Basílica de Nuestra Señora del Socorro, Basílica de San Antonio de Padua, Basílica de San Carlos Borromeo y María Auxiliadora, Basílica de San Francisco de Asís, Basílica de San José de Flores, Basílica de San Nicolás de Bari (a National Shrine), Basílica de Santa Rosa de Lima, Basílica del Espíritu Santo, Basílica del Sagrado Corazón de Jesús, Buenos Aires and Basílica del Santísimo Sacramento.

== Ecclesiastical province ==
The archdiocese has eleven suffragan sees, of which nine are Latin:

- Roman Catholic Diocese of Avellaneda-Lanús
- Roman Catholic Diocese of Gregorio de Laferrere
- Roman Catholic Diocese of Lomas de Zamora
- Roman Catholic Diocese of Morón
- Roman Catholic Diocese of Quilmes
- Roman Catholic Diocese of San Isidro
- Roman Catholic Diocese of San Justo
- Roman Catholic Diocese of San Martín
- Roman Catholic Diocese of San Miguel

It also has two Eastern Catholic suffragans :

- Maronite Eparchy of San Charbel of Buenos Aires
- Ukrainian Catholic Eparchy of Santa María del Patrocinio en Buenos Aires.

== History ==
- It was erected on 6 April 1620 as Diocese of Buenos Aires, on territory split off from the then Roman Catholic Diocese of Paraguay.
- It lost territories on 14 August 1832 to establish the Apostolic Vicariate of Montevideo (now Metropolitan) and again on 13 June 1859 to establish the Diocese of Paraná (now Metropolitan)
- Elevated on 5 March 1866 to Metropolitan Archdiocese of Buenos Aires.
- Lost territories again in 1884 to establish the Apostolic Vicariate of Northern Patagonia and on February 15, 1897, to establish the then Diocese of La Plata, but gained (back) territories in 1904 from the suppressed above Apostolic Vicariate of Northern Patagonia and on 4 October 1916 from the suppressed Apostolic Prefecture of Southern Patagonia
- On 20 April 1934 it lost territory to establish the Diocese of Viedma
- It received Papal visits from Pope John Paul II in June 1982 and April 1987.

== Ordinaries ==
Bishops of Buenos Aires

1. Pedro Carranza Salinas, O.Carm. (1620–1632)
2. Cristóbal de Aresti Martínez de Aguilar, O.S.B. (1635–1641)
3. Cristóbal de la Mancha y Velazco, O.P. (1641–1673)
4. Antonio de Azcona Imberto (1676–1700)
5. Gabriel de Arregui, O.F.M. (1712–1716), appointed Bishop of Cuzco
6. Pedro de Fajardo, O.SS.T. (1713–1729)
7. Juan de Arregui, O.F.M. (1730–1736)
8. José de Peralta Barrionuevo y Rocha Benavídez, O.P. (1738–1746), appointed Bishop of La Paz
9. Cayetano Marcellano y Agramont (1749–1757), appointed Bishop of Trujillo and later Archbishop of La Plata
10. José Antonio Basurco y Herrera (1757–1761)
11. Manuel Antonio de la Torre (1762–1776)
12. Sebastián Malvar y Pinto, O.F.M. (1777–1783), appointed Archbishop of Santiago de Compostela
13. Manuel Azamor y Ramírez (1785–1796)
14. Pedro Inocencio Bejarano (1797–1801), appointed Bishop of Sigüenza
15. Benito Lué y Riega (1802–1812)
16. Mariano Medrano y Cabrera (1829–1851)

Archbishops of Buenos Aires

1. Mariano José de Escalada (1854–1870)
2. León Federico Aneiros (1873–1894)
3. Uladislao Castellano (1895–1900)
4. Mariano Antonio Espinosa (1900–1923)
5. José María Bottaro y Hers, O.F.M. (1926–1932)
6. Cardinal Santiago Copello (1932–1959), appointed Chancellor of the Holy Roman Church
7. Fermín Emilio Lafitte (1959)
8. Cardinal Antonio Caggiano (1959–1975)
9. Cardinal Juan Carlos Aramburu (1975–1990)
10. Cardinal Antonio Quarracino (1990–1998)
11. Cardinal Jorge Bergoglio, S.J. (1998–2013), elected Pope Francis (2013–25)
12. Cardinal Mario Poli (2013–2023)
13. Jorge García Cuerva (2023–present)

=== Coadjutor archbishops ===
- Fermín Emilio Lafitte (1958–1959)
- Juan Carlos Cardinal Aramburu (1967–1975); future cardinal
- Jorge Bergoglio, S.J. (1997–1998); future cardinal, Pope Francis from 2013 to 2025

=== Auxiliary Bishops of Buenos Aires ===
- Miguel Moises Araoz (1871–1883)
- Juan Agustín Boneo (1893–1898), appointed Bishop of Santa Fe
- Juan Nepomuceno Terrero y Escalada (1898–1900), appointed Bishop of La Plata
- Gregorio Ignazio Romero (1899–1915)
- Francisco Alberti (1917–1921), appointed Bishop of La Plata and later Archbishop of La Plata
- Miguel de Andrea (1919–1960)
- Fortunado Devoto (1927–1941)
- Santiago Luis Copello (1928), appointed Archbishop here (Cardinal in 1935)
- Antonio Rocca (1936–1975)
- Tomás Juan Carlos Solari (1943–1948), appointed Archbishop of La Plata
- Manuel Tato (1948–1961), appointed Bishop of Santiago del Estero
- Manuel Menéndez (1956–1961), appointed Bishop of San Martín
- Guillermo Bolatti (1957–1961), appointed Bishop of Rosario and later Archbishop of Rosario
- Victorio Manuel Bonamín, Salesians (S.D.B.) (1960–1975)
- Jorge Carlos Carreras (1962–1965), appointed Bishop of San Rafael and later Bishop of San Justo
- Oscar Félix Villena (1962–1970), appointed Bishop of San Rafael and later Auxiliary Bishop of Rosario
- Ernesto Segura (1962–1972)
- Manuel Augusto Cárdenas (1962–1975)
- Horacio Alberto Bózzoli (1975–1978), appointed Bishop of San Rafael and later Archbishop of Tucumán
- Guillermo Leaden, S.D.B. (1975–1992)
- Mario José Serra (1975–2002)
- José Manuel Lorenzo (1977–1983), appointed Bishop of San Miguel
- Arnaldo Clemente Canale (1977–1990)
- Domingo Salvador Castagna (1978–1984), appointed Bishop of San Nicolás de los Arroyos and later Archbishop of Corrientes
- Luis Héctor Villalba (1984–1991), appointed Bishop of San Martín and later Archbishop of Tucumán (elevated to Cardinal in 2015)
- Eduardo Mirás (1984–1993), appointed Archbishop of Rosario
- Rubén Oscar Frassia (1992–1993), appointed Bishop of San Carlos de Bariloche and later Bishop of Avellaneda
- Jorge Mario Bergoglio, S.J. (1992–1997), appointed Coadjutor here; future Cardinal and Pope Francis
- Héctor Rubén Aguer (1992–1998), appointed Coadjutor Archbishop of La Plata and later Archbishop of La Plata
- Raúl Omar Rossi (1992–2000), appointed Bishop of San Martín
- José Luis Mollaghan (1993–2000), appointed Bishop of San Miguel and later Archbishop of Rosario
- Guillermo Rodríguez Melgarejo (1994–2003), appointed Bishop of San Martín
- Horacio Ernesto Benites Astoul (1999–2008)
- Jorge Eduardo Lozano (2000–2005), appointed Bishop of Gualeguaychú and later Coadjutor Archbishop and Archbishop of San Juan de Cuyo
- Joaquín Mariano Sucunza (2000–present)
- José Antonio Gentico (2001–2007)
- Eduardo Horacio García (2003–2014), appointed Bishop of San Justo
- Raúl Martín (2006–2013)
- Óscar Vicente Ojea (2006–2009), appointed Coadjutor and later Bishop of San Isidro
- Enrique Eguía Seguí (2008–present)
- Luis Alberto Fernández Alara (2009–2013), appointed Bishop of Rafaela
- Vicente Bokalic Iglic, C.M. (2010–2013), appointed Bishop of Santiago del Estero
- Alejandro Daniel Giorgi (2014–present)
- Ernesto Giobando, S.J. (2014–present)
- Juan Carlos Ares (2014–present)
- José María Baliña (2015–present)
- Gustavo Oscar Carrara (2017–present)

=== Other priests of this diocese who became bishops ===
- Nicolás Fasolino, appointed Bishop of Santa Fe in 1932; future Cardinal
- Emilio Antonio di Pasquo, appointed Bishop of San Luis in 1946
- Antonio María Aguirre, appointed Bishop of San Isidro in 1957
- Alberto Devoto, appointed Bishop of Goya in 1961
- Vicente Faustino Zazpe, appointed Bishop of Rafaela in 1961
- Carlos Horacio Ponce de Léon, appointed Auxiliary Bishop of Salta in 1962
- Luis Juan Tomé, appointed Bishop of Mercedes in 1963
- Carmelo Juan Giaquinta, appointed Auxiliary Bishop of Viedma in 1980
- Jorge María Mejía, appointed titular Bishop in 1986; future Cardinal
- Leonardo Sandri, appointed titular Archbishop in 1997; future Cardinal
- Fernando Carlos Maletti, appointed Bishop of San Carlos de Bariloche in 2001
- Antonio Marino, appointed Auxiliary Bishop of La Plata in 2003
- Eduardo Maria Taussig, appointed Bishop of San Rafael in 2004
- César Daniel Fernández, appointed Auxiliary Bishop of Paraná in 2007
- Luis Mariano Montemayor, appointed titular Archbishop in 2008
- Ariel Edgardo Torrado Mosconi, appointed Auxiliary Bishop of Santiago del Estero in 2008
- Alfredo Horacio Zecca, appointed Archbishop of Tucumán in 2011
- Fernando Martín Croxatto (priest here, 1986–2000), appointed Auxiliary Bishop of Comodoro Rivadavia in 2014
- Han Lim Moon, appointed Auxiliary Bishop of San Martín in 2014
- Jorge Martín Torres Carbonell, appointed Auxiliary Bishop of Lomas de Zamora in 2014
- Alejandro Pablo Benna, appointed Auxiliary Bishop of Comodoro Rivadavia in 2017
- Luis Dario Martín, appointed Auxiliary Bishop of Santa Rosa in 2019
- Ignacio Damián Medina, appointed Auxiliary Bishop of Lomas de Zamora in 2019

== See also ==
- Catholicism in Argentina
- List of Catholic dioceses in Argentina

== Sources and external links ==
- GCatholic, with Google map & satellite photo - data for all sections
- (in Spanish) Arzobispado de Buenos Aires — Website of the Archdiocese.
- (in English) Catholic-Hierarchy — Statistics on the Archdiocese of Buenos Aires.
