= Jorge Ignacio García Cuerva =

20th and 21st-century Roman Catholic Archbishop

The Most Reverend. Jorge Ignacio García Cuerva
- Metropolitan Archbishop of Buenos Aires
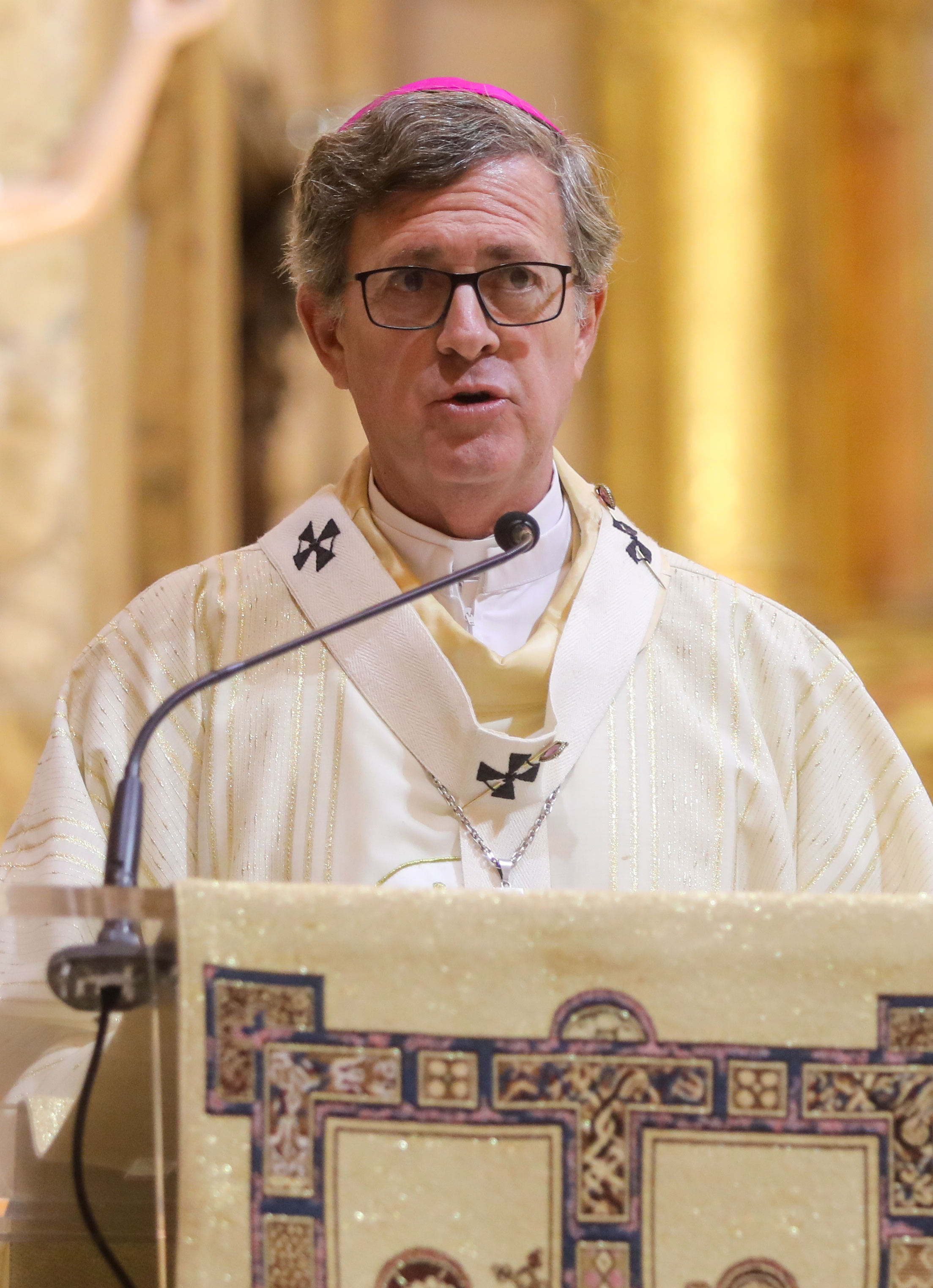
- García Cuerva in 2024
- Church: Roman Catholic Church
- Archdiocese: Buenos Aires
- Metropolis: Buenos Aires
- See: Buenos Aires
- Appointed: 26 May 2023
- Installed: 15 July 2023
- Predecessor: Mario Aurelio Poli
- Previous posts: Auxiliary Bishop of Lomas de Zamora (2017–2019); Bishop of Río Gallegos (2019–2023)

Orders
- Ordination: 24 October 1997 by Jorge Casaretto
- Consecration: 3 March 2018 by Jorge Rubén Lugones

Personal details
- Born: Jorge Ignacio García Cuerva; 12 April 1968 (age 58) Río Gallegos, Argentina
- Denomination: Roman Catholic
- Occupation: Archbishop, Clergyman
- Profession: Theologian, Philosopher, Scholar.
- Education: Argentine Catholic University
- Motto: No apartes tu rostro del pobre (Do not turn your face away from the poor)
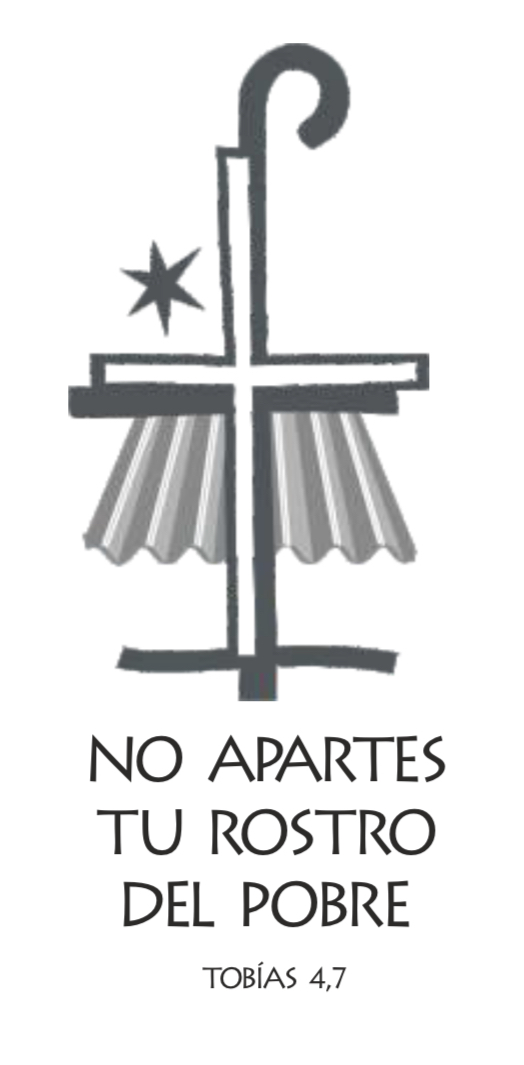
- Coat of arms

Jorge Ignacio García Cuerva (born 12 April 1968) is an Argentine prelate of the Catholic Church who has been archbishop of Buenos Aires since 2023.

He was bishop of Río Gallegos from 2019 to 2023 and an auxiliary bishop of Lomas de Zamora from 2017 to 2019.

== Biography ==
Jorge Ignacio García Cuerva was born in Río Gallegos on 12 April 1968. He studied philosophy and theology at the seminary of the diocese of San Isidro. He was ordained a priest on 24 October 1997. He earned licentiate degrees in theology, with specialization in Church history and canon law, from the Pontificia Universidad Católica Argentina “Santa María de los Buenos Aires”, and get a qualification as a lawyer at the Universidad Católica de Salta (UCASAL) in Argentina.

He worked as parish vicar and parish priest of Nuestra Señora de la Cava in Beccar; parish priest of Santa Clara de Asís in Tigre; promotor of justice in the interdiocesan tribunal of San Isidro, Merlo-Moreno; vice president of diocesan Caritas; diocesan delegate for prison pastoral care, and chaplain of various penitentiaries of the province of Buenos Aires.

On 20 November 2017, Pope Francis appointed him titular bishop of Lacubaza and auxiliary bishop of Lomas de Zamora. He received his episcopal ordination on 3 March 2018.

On 3 January 2019 Pope Francis appointed him bishop of Río Gallegos. He became deputy chair of the International Commission of Catholic Prison Pastoral Care.

He was appointed a member of the Dicastery for Bishops of the Roman Curia in July 2021 and the pontifical delegate for the International Commission of Catholic Prison Pastoral Care in December 2025.

On 26 May 2023, Pope Francis named him archbishop of Buenos Aires.

Since 2 March 2026, he additionally has served as an Apostolic Administrator of the Armenian Catholic Eparchy of San Gregorio de Narek en Buenos Aires.
