= Mario José Serra =

Catholic bishop (1926–2005)

Mario José Serra (March 12, 1926 – July 9, 2005) was a prelate of the Catholic Church. He served as auxiliary bishop of Buenos Aires from 1975 till 2002.

== Life ==
Born in Buenos Aires, Serra was ordained to the priesthood on December 4, 1949.

On May 28, 1975, he was appointed auxiliary bishop of Buenos Aires and titular bishop of Mentesa. Serra received his episcopal consecration on the following August 8 from Juan Carlos Aramburu, archbishop of Buenos Aires, who would later become a cardinal, with the archbishop of Santa Fe, Vicente Faustino Zazpe, and the bishop of Mar del Plata, Eduardo Francisco Pironio, who would later become a cardinal, serving as co-consecrators.

On February 8, 2002 Pope John Paul II accepted his retirement, on grounds of his age. He died on July 9, 2005.
