= Manuel Costa de los Ríos =

African slave

Servant of God Manuel Costa de los Ríos
- A bas relief of Negro Manuel at the Basilica of Our Lady of Luján in Luján, Buenos Aires.
- Born: Manuel Costa de los Ríos ca. 1604; Guinea
- Died: 1686; Luján, Viceroyalty of Peru
- Occupation: Custodian
- Spouse: Beatriz

Manuel Costa de los Ríos (ca. 1604 – 1686) popularly known in Spanish as Negro Manuel (English: "Black Manuel"), was an Afro-Argentine enslaved man known for being the primary witness to the miracle of Our Lady of Luján, said to have taken place in 1631 in Zelaya, Buenos Aires. He became a guardian of the site and promoted the Luján devotion.

Born in West Africa and brought down the Río de la Plata as a slave from Pernambuco, Brazil, to Buenos Aires. His first master was the captain of the ship that brought him, and he was later owned by the manager of the ranch on the banks of the Luján River. There, in 1631, two images of the Immaculate Conception were brought from Brazil and arrived at the port in Buenos Aires, being further brought toward Santiago del Estero. When they stopped on the banks of the Luján River near Ríos' home, the oxcarts carrying them became stuck in place until one of the images was removed and left at the ranch. The owner left the image with Ríos.

In 1671, when the chapel had fallen into disrepair, the image of Luján was acquired by Ana de Matos, who moved it to her estate in the city. In 1674, as Ríos sued for his freedom—and after the image was said to have repeatedly relocated to where Manuel was located—he was purchased by Matos and, at his request, brought to her residence with the image. Ríos continued to look after it and welcome pilgrims for more than 50 years until his death in 1686. His beatification cause was opened in 2016.

== Background ==
During the 16th and 17th centuries, the first enslaved Africans arrived in the Río de la Plata region, hailing from areas south of the equator—including Angola, the Congo, Mozambique, and southeastern Africa. Beyond providing manual labor, they possessed specialized knowledge in medicine, agriculture, and the working of wood and iron; consequently, they were forced to perform the most arduous tasks in society, serving as the primary workforce on estates, in sugar mills, and in artisanal workshops. Between 1777 and 1812, more than 700 ships carrying 72,000 African slaves arrived at the ports of Buenos Aires and Montevideo; however, many of these individuals did not survive the voyage due to the abysmal conditions during transport. By 1810, Buenos Aires had a population of approximately 40,000, 20% of whom were of African origin.

== Biography ==
=== Early life and young adulthood (1604-1631) ===
Manuel Costa de los Ríos was born in 1604 in the Costa de Los Ríos region of Guinea in West Africa. He grew up in a tribe that subsisted on hunting and fishing. Little is known about his childhood, other than that he was of the Yoruba people, likely worshiped Ọlọrun as a youth and was a skilled medicine man. He also spoke Portuguese and, later, Spanish.

During a slave raid, Ríos was captured and enslaved by traders who brought him to the island of Santiago, Cape Verde. Here, he was baptized a Christian, given the name "Manuel" and his hometown was appended. (His birth name is unknown.) According to the researcher Msgrv Juan Guillermo Durán, Ríos was brought to the Río de la Plata region on March 21, 1630 or 1631, as part of a group of African slaves brought from Pernambuco, Brazil, aboard the ship San Andrés, to be sold in Buenos Aires. Other sources say Ríos was enslaved and trafficked when he was eight years old.

Ríos' first master was the captain of the ship that brought him from Africa, Andrea Juan. At the request of Juan's friend Antonio Farías de Sáa–who had acquired a ranch in Sumampa, Santiago del Estero–and planned to build a chapel there, Juan bought two images of the Virgin Mary to Brazil so that Farías de Sáa could choose the one he liked best. Both were packed separately because, being made of terracotta, they were at risk of breaking during the voyage. The sailor also gave Ríos the position of page—a servant on the ship. The ship San Andrés set sail for the port of Buenos Aires and arrived on March 21, 1631, but Andrea Juan encountered a series of complications related to smuggling. The issues were overcome thanks to the help of Captain Bernabé González Filiano. In gratitude, Andrea Juan gave the captain his slave, Ríos, who was taken to the ranch that Filiano's stepson, Diego Rosendo de Trigueros, owned in Luján.

=== The Miracle of the Carts (1631) ===
Andrea Juan decided to personally deliver the images of the Virgin to de Sáa using a team of carts. One depicted the Immaculate Conception, and the other a Virgin with the Child Jesus in her arms. On the way, the carts carrying them stopped in Zelaya at the ranch owned by Rosendo de Trigueros, where Ríos lived. Despite the oxen's efforts, they could not move the carts, which had become immobilized.

"The driver of the cart carrying the Sacred Images yoked his oxen, and when, already tied to the cart, he tried to continue in their designated place, it happened that, however much the robust and patient beasts tried to move it, the vehicle completely refused to roll; as if it were stopped by an insurmountable obstacle or stuck in the ground by an invisible force." –Fr Jorge María Salvaire

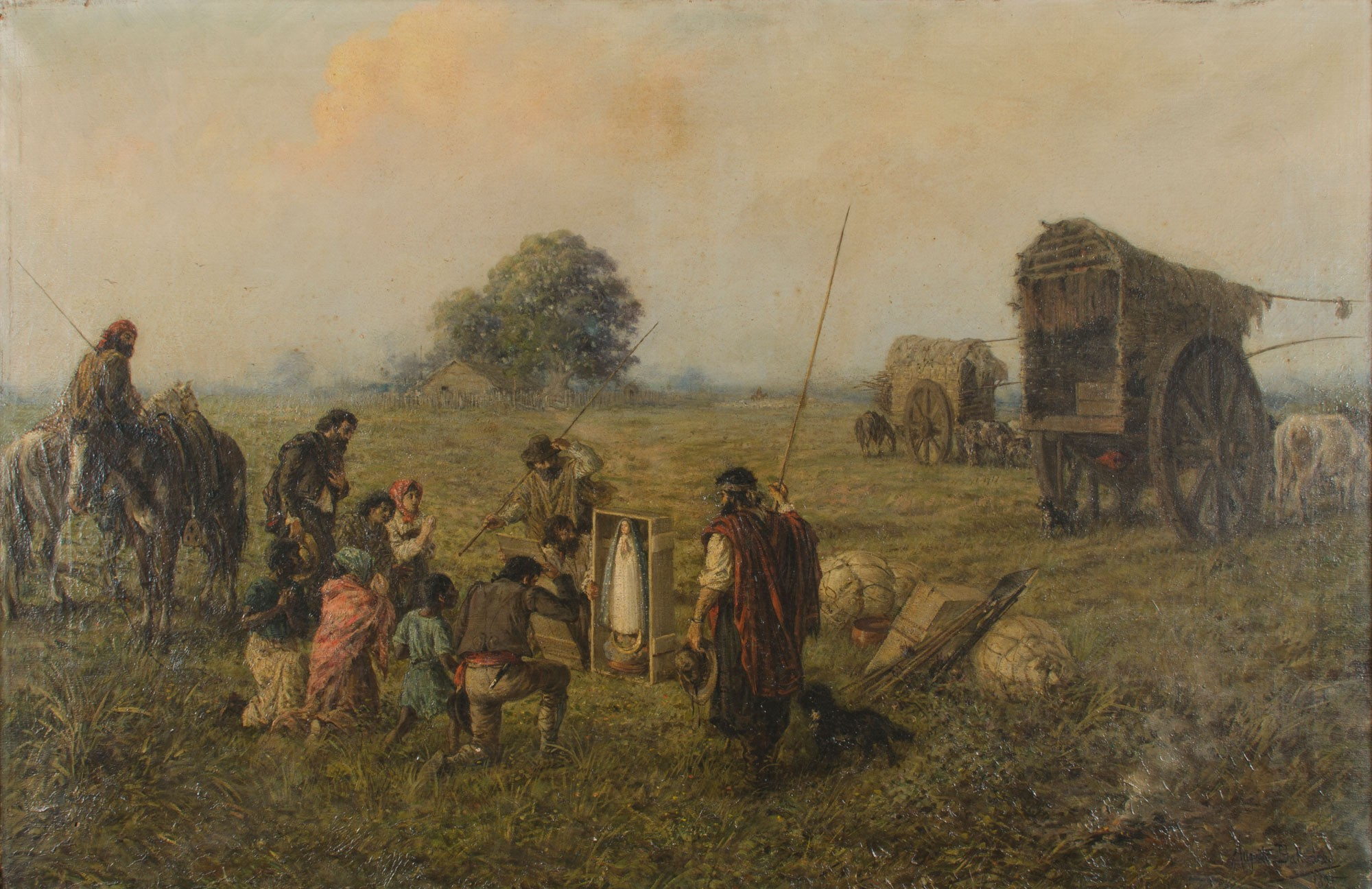
Origen milagroso de Ntra. Sra. de Luján en año 1630, by Augusto Ballerini, 1895.

The transporters initially thought it was due to the excess weight and proceeded to lighten the load on the cart. However, even after adding two more draft animals, they still did not move. Finally, they realized that when they took one of the images of the Virgin off the cart—the one of the Immaculate Conception—the cart began to move. When this happened, those present exclaimed, "A miracle! The Virgin wants to stay here!" The small, 38-centimeter-tall painted terracotta image became known as Our Lady of Luján. The first account of the miracle belongs to the Franciscan friar Pedro Nolasco de Santa María and was written in 1737:

“I certify that I heard from my deceased father, my great-grandmother, and other people from the area [...] a Portuguese man, a resident of Córdoba, who founded the Sumampa estate, asked a fellow countryman to bring him from Brazil a small image of the Immaculate Conception, to place in a chapel that he was building on his estate; and that with this order, two were sent to him at the same time; which, packed in crates, he loaded onto his cart.”

Trigueros and his half-brother Juan de Oramas, who later became a prestigious clergymen, showed disinterest regarding the event throughout their lives. Trigueros in particular did not revisit the ranch after 1645. This could have been due to their young age when the miracle occurred (Trigueros was 11), or to fear of the Inquisition.

=== Caretaking the image at the Trigueros ranch (1631-1662) ===
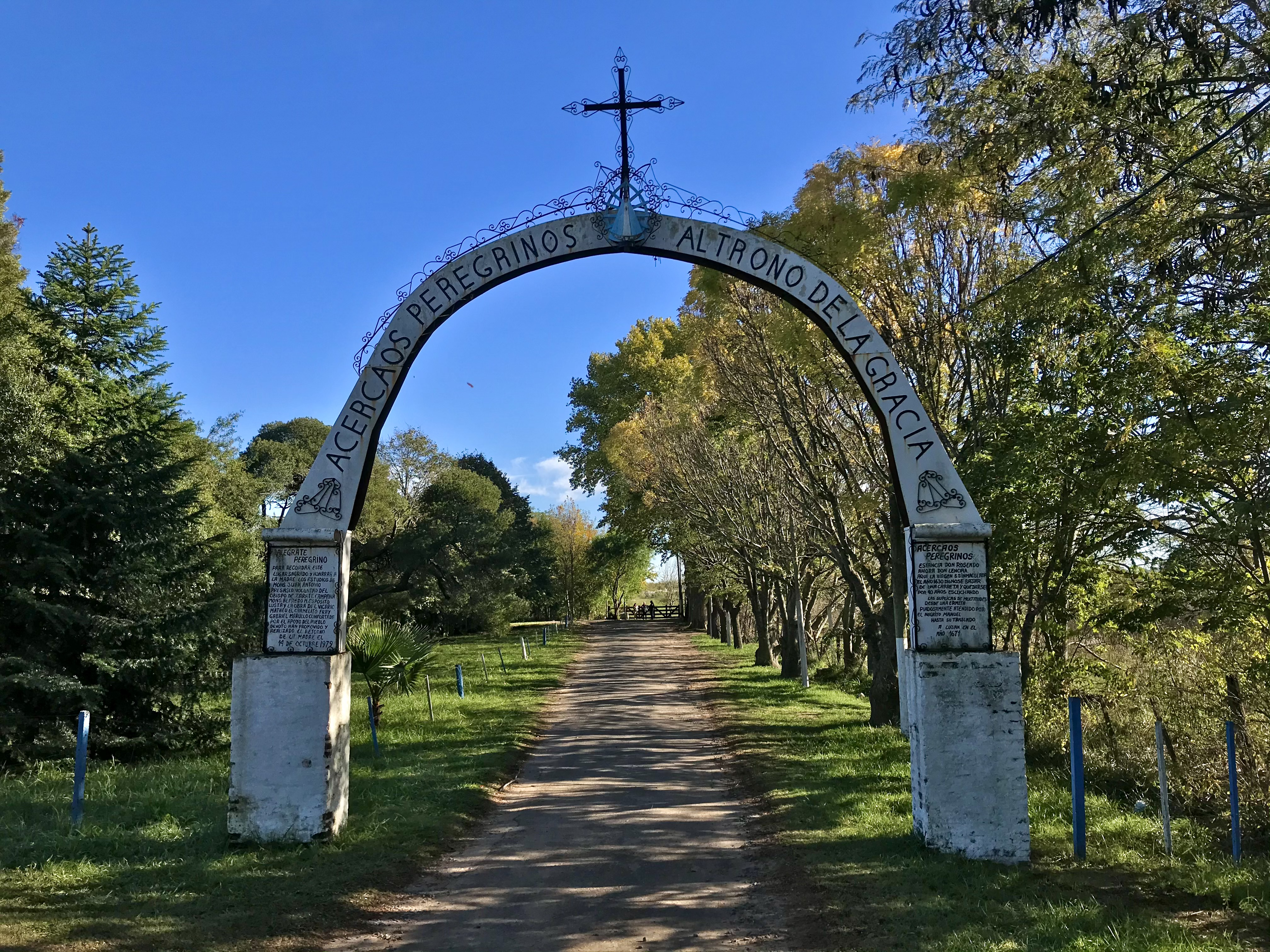
Entrance to the hermitage that constituted the first dwelling of the image of the Virgin, better known as "the place of the miracle", which became a tourist point of the town of Zelaya and the Pilar district .

González Filiano entrusted Ríos with the care of the Luján image, first in a humble oratory erected in 1633 within the ranch itself. It was later housed in a chapel built with the collaboration of González Filiano, Trigueros and Ríos himself. Ríos was responsible for the daily cleaning and decoration of the chapel with candles. An inventory of goods from 1645, taken after González Filiano's death, described it as "a small chapel, and in it a crucified Christ, about a quarter of a vara high, and a three-dimensional image of Our Lady, made of clay, about half a vara high."

The "Miracle of the Cart" spread rapidly because it occurred on an old road, a privileged means of disseminating the news in all directions. In this regard, Msgr Juan Antonio Presas pointed out in a critical-historical study from 1974:

"The chapel was of moderate size, nine varas wide and thirty varas long. It was made of mud and bricks and had a gabled roof, plastered on the outside and its interior walls whitewashed. We know that this sanctuary was built with fired bricks, a notable feature in those times. The portico faced north and a wall with three windows rose to a certain height, like a tower, from which three bells hung. In the chapel's enclosure, the main altar with its corresponding altarpiece occupied the back of the presbytery; the Blessed Sacrament was kept in a gilded wooden tabernacle."

On December 13, 1637, due to the growth of devotion and the constant influx of pilgrims, the Bishop of Buenos Aires, Cristóbal de Aresti Martínez de Aguilar, created the Luján River Parish with its seat at the Trigueros chapel. However, the existence of the parish was ephemeral due to the distance that separated it from Buenos Aires and the scarcity of priests who could take charge of its care. As a result, the area was left in the care of itinerant missionaries from the Mercedarians and Franciscans. Ríos married a Creole woman, Beatriz, who was in the service of the González Filiano family, around 1638. In a small chapel made of mud and straw, for 55 years—from 1631 to 1686—Ríos received the faithful who came to venerate the Luján image and anointed the sick with candle oil to cure their ailments. Fr Pedro Montalvo came to see Ríos in 1684 while ailing from a serious lung disease. Ríos anointed him on the chest with oil and gave him an infusion to drink, prepared with burrs removed from the sacred mantle, which restored the priest's health. Ríos confessed to him: "The Virgin wants you to be her priest." Montalvo then became his chaplain for 16 years. Oliver Maqueda noted in a chronicle:

"...that the Virgin responded [to such devotion] by explaining herself with repeated prodigies and wonders; and he adds that, "as the miracles of the Virgin increased, so too did the devotion of those who, grateful for the benefits received, or in need of relief from their ailments, came to Luján on pilgrimages."

Sometimes, Ríos noticed that the image was missing from its niche at night and would find it again the next morning, sometimes covered in dew, sometimes in dust and mud, and sometimes with burrs and brambles on its mantle and dress. Ríos would say to it: “My Lady, what need do you have to leave your house to remedy any need when you are so powerful? And, since you are such a friend to sinners, why do you go out in search of them when you see them treating you so badly?” The chronicles of the time asserted that Manuel was in charge of removing the burrs from the Virgin's mantle whenever she escaped to help her devotees and also that he performed powerful cures with the tallow from the candles that burned around her.

=== Deterioration of the chapel (1663-1670) ===
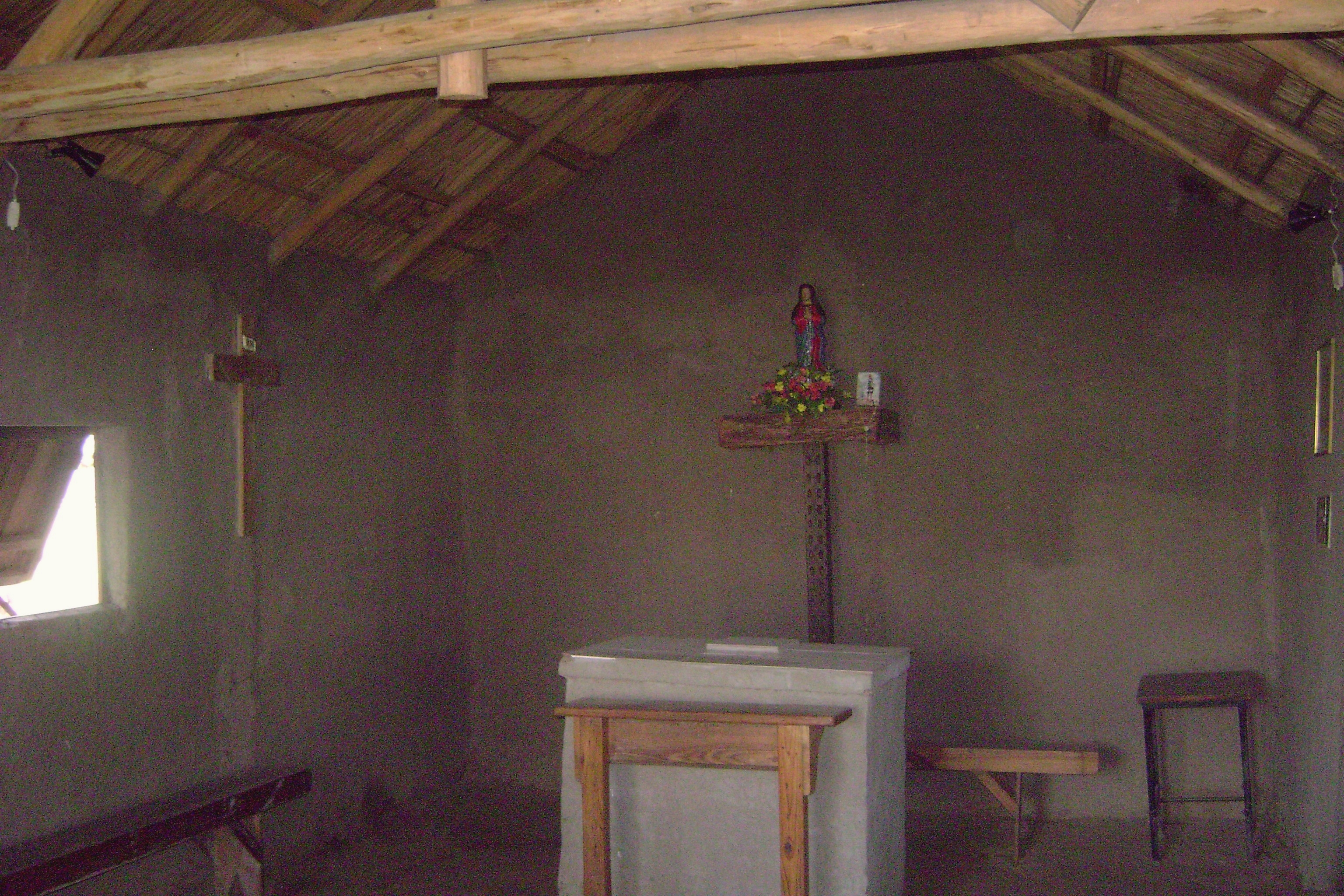
Interior of the first adobe chapel where the black man Manuel watched over the care of the image of the Virgin. Zelaya, 2011.

Around 1666, the Luján image became the property of Trigueros's representative, Juan de Oramas Filiano—his half-brother—who then abandoned the image. Fr Gregorio Suárez de Cordero, parish priest of the Buenos Aires Metropolitan Cathedral, who visited the Trigueros chapel in 1671, testified that by that time it was practically deserted after the closure of the so-called "old road" to Córdoba in 1663. Records were also found of repeated cattle thefts , the property's only source of income, attributed largely to pilgrims who, under the pretext of visiting the hermitage, vandalized the ranch's livestock.

"Due to the death of Rosendo de Oramas, and the delays in his stay, the chapel of the Virgin became almost deserted, although Negrito Manuel never abandoned it. He was the one who took care of its cleanliness and tidiness, and of always having candles lit before its sacred Image."

While some chroniclers, such as Maqueda and Santa María, linked the depopulation of the ranch and the precarious condition of the oratory to the death of de Trigueros, he had actually died prior, in 1680. According to the researchers, the decline of the sanctuary was actually related to his transfer from the rectorship of the Buenos Aires Cathedral to the parish of Corrientes in 1666. This led de Trigueros to entrust the administration of his property to de Oramas Filiano, who showed no particular interest in caring for and maintaining the property. Ríos, however, remained at the oratory, faithfully fulfilling his duties: cleaning the premises, illuminating the image and attending to the pilgrims, whose numbers began to dwindle.

=== Miraculous disappearances and Ana de Matos (1671) ===
When the estate and chapel fell into disrepair, Ana de Matos requested the image be brought to her residence, where a new chapel would be built. The purchase was agreed upon for 200 pesos, but it did not include Ríos, who remained on Oramas's estate performing domestic duties. Santa María recounted the episode in one of his chronicles:

"And as time passed, and the owner of that estate died, it became almost deserted. And because of the great frequency of devotees who came, moved by its many miracles, and because they had nowhere to stay at the estate, a lady, whom I knew, named Doña Ana de Matos, asked that the Image be given to her, so that she could take it to her estate, which was on the said river [Luján]; and indeed they let her take it, and she placed it in an oratory, also small, where I first saw the Image."

Maqueda, for his part, commented on the financial reward:

"Since the miracles experienced were so frequent, the number of people who came from afar on pilgrimages to visit the Image of Our Lady was also constant. The pilgrims suffered some distress because there was no house or ranch in that place where they could stay and make frequent visits. Desiring to remedy this need, and eager to increase devotion to the Immaculate Mother, a certain lady named Doña Ana de Matos, widow of Sergeant Major Don Marcos de Sequeyra, asked the heir of the aforementioned Rosendo (who had already died), named Master Juan Oramas, former parish priest of the Cathedral Church of Buenos Aires, to grant her the Image, assuring him that she would care for it and build a chapel for it on her estate, which was closer to Buenos Aires, about four or five blocks from where the church stands today." Master Oramas had little difficulty in agreeing to the proposal, because he was convinced that those attending the chapel were stealing cattle from the ranch, and Doña Ana gratefully responded by giving him some reward, no less than two hundred pesos.

Subsequently, the image of Our Lady of Luján inexplicably disappeared several times, only to reappear in Zelaya next to Ríos. Maqueda recounted the experience as follows:

"So she took the Holy Image to her house and placed it in a decent room, intending to soon build a public chapel for it. But the next day, she noticed, not without alarm, that the Image was not where she had left it the day before, nor could it be found anywhere in the house, no matter how much she searched. Distressed by this, she wondered if the Virgin had returned to her old chapel in Oramas. She made an effort to find out, and found it to be just as she had suspected. She went back for it a second time, and a second time it was missing from her house, this time in the first chapel without any human presence. Disconsolate at this strange occurrence, Doña Ana did not dare to take it a third time, because she reasoned that the same thing would happen as the previous two times; moreover, she feared that the Virgin would punish her persistence, since, in her opinion, she was giving the impression that the Virgin did not like being in her house." However, moved by divine inspiration, she made the wise decision to share this news with both the ecclesiastical and secular councils of Buenos Aires. By then, the image of Our Lady of Luján was already famous in this city for the miracles recounted by those who invoked her in their afflictions, so Doña Ana was readily believed when she came to report the event to the superiors, both ecclesiastical and secular.

Since the alleged miracles continued even after the ranch was surrounded by a guard detachment, the Bishop of Buenos Aires was informed and a solemn transfer of the image to de Matos's house was arranged. It took place on the eve of the Feast of the Immaculate Conception in 1671. It was attended by the Bishop of Buenos Aires, Cristóbal de la Mancha y Velazco, Governor Martínez de Salazar, members of the Cabildo, religious congregations, confraternities, priests, and Ríos. The image never returned to the Oramas ranch.

=== Royal conflict and the sale of Ríos (1672-1674) ===
Manuel was not involved in the negotiations for the sale and transfer of the image to de Matos. He remained on the Trigueros estate initially and was reclaimed by its owners, even through legal channels. After being separated from the image, Ríos, terribly distressed, initiated legal action in Buenos Aires to be declared free before the judges of the Real Audiencia of Buenos Aires, but his efforts failed. It was there that, according to the chronicles of the time, Ríos defended himself by saying: "I belong only to the Virgin". He commented that his master had told him on several occasions during his youth that he should be dedicated to the service of the Virgin.

“[After his arrival in Luján] there were some difficulties to overcome, since Master Oramas claimed to be his slave as the heir of the deceased master who brought him. The black man defended himself by saying that he belonged only to the Virgin, and that his master had told him several times, when he was a boy, that he had dedicated him to the service of the Virgin in her Holy Image. There was some litigation on this point, but it was settled when Doña Ana gave Master Oramas one hundred pesos, with which he ceded his right.”

De Matos finally decided to pay 250 pesos for the slave so that he could move to her hacienda and continue caring for the image. Oramas was prevented from selling Manuel because he had been in the possession of Catalina Páez Clavijo—a relative of Trigueros—and her husband Juan Gutiérrez Garcés since 1671. The purchase, then, was made through a collection in 1674, when Manuel was approximately 70 years old. Sgt Juan Cebrián de Velazco, a principal member of the Confraternity of the Immaculate Conception of the Luján River, also participated, contributing 150 pesos of the total fee for Ríos. The purchase and sale document was found by collaborators of Fr Presas in the General Archive of the Nation and published for the first time in 1974. The deed is a testament to the historicity of the black man Manuel, as it reliably certifies the sale, including his name, origin, age, proof of physical health and absence of vices. In the deed of sale, the heirs of Captain González Filiano emphasized that:

“Black Manuel has attempted to pursue the cause of his freedom, on the grounds that he has been attending, without subjection, with our devotion and consent, the service of the Chapel and altar of Our Lady of Luján; but all of this is without foundation, even though there are people in his favor who move him to such an endeavor. However, because many people devoted to the said Holy Image of Luján have intervened in the case, so that the good work and devotion of the said Manuel may not cease, as is evident, we thus sell him by royal sale for the work of the said Holy Chapel and Image of Luján, so that he may serve it and take care of its worship, veneration, and cleanliness.”

"...and below this we say that as for the goods given to me, the said Doña Catalina Páez Clavijo, as dowry, was a black man named Manuel Costa de los Ríos, who appears to be seventy years old, whom Doña Basilia de Trigueros, my mother, inherited from Captain Bernabé González Filiano and Doña Francisca de Trigueros, my grandparents, as appears from certain documents presented in a lawsuit that said black Manuel has attempted to pursue regarding his freedom, given that he has been attending, without subjection, by our devotion and with our consent, the service of the chapel and altar of Our Lady of Luján, and recognizing the little or no basis that the said black Manuel has to continue the right to freedom that he claims, which some people had urged him to pursue to our detriment, and having withdrawn from the case, many people devoted to the said Image of Our Lady of Luján have intervened so that we may sell him as a slave to said Image, which we have agreed to do because "May the good work and devotion of the said Manuel not cease, as is experienced."

=== Later life (1675-1685) ===
When he wasn't acting as caretaker, Ríos dedicated himself to making reins, boots, girths, saddle blankets, whips, and lassos to survive, as well as collecting alms for the maintenance of the sanctuary. In mid-1677, the Carmelite priest Juan de la Concepción blessed the foundations of the first temple built on Ana de Matos's estate. On October 2, 1682, the owner of the estate, who had inherited large lands from her husband, made a donation of several hectares:

"It is my will that this donation of land be revoked, and that my heirs enter into its rights, [re]covering, likewise, the said Image of Our Lady of the Immaculate Conception, with respect to having acquired it with my money, from the hand of Master Juan de Oramas Filiano, Parish Priest who is at present of this City... Because I have great love for the invocation of Our Lady of the Immaculate Conception and her Holy Image, I grant and donation to said image all the land that it may need for the construction of its chapel."

The donation was made on the condition that the image remain in perpetuity on her lands to ensure the continuation of the Luján devotion; in this way, the chapel to be built in honor of Our Lady of Luján became official and public and the city of Luján was founded. De Matos died on January 25, 1698. In her testamentary declaration, dated September 17, 1697, she stated: “I declare that by a real purchase I made from Master Juan de Oramas, Parish Priest of this Holy Church, I acquired a Holy Image, a work of the Immaculate and Pure Conception of Our Lady, which I had placed for some time in a room of my dwelling in said estate of Luján.” Regarding de Matos, Salvaire noted:

“...in the early stages of the veneration of our blessed Image, we see the powerful intervention of a noble, generous, and most devout American woman, Doña Ana de Matos y Encinas de Siqueyra. Desiring to alleviate, as far as possible, the pressing needs of the pilgrims; fearing, despite her faith, that the venerable Effigy [would suffer the consequences of some raid in those lonely places]; eager above all to increase the devotion to the Immaculate Mother; obedient, moreover, without a doubt, to an inner inspiration… that was communicated to her in a mysterious way, Doña Ana de Matos, driven by both her charity and her devotion, conceived the plan to move the Holy Image from the Oramas residence, where it was exposed to human hands, to her own residence.”

Presas commented on the fate of the Virgin and the passive attitude of her previous owners:

“Rosendo and Oramas, the original owner and the successor and heir of the same Chapel and Image [as full administrator], lived inhibited by it and were never zealous propagators of the cause; its contagion, there is no doubt, greatly influenced the spirit of the devout and simple people. The picture only changes when Mrs. Ana de Matos intervenes in the scene. Until 1671 [the year of the transfer] we do not see any clergyman appear in the history of Our Lady of Luján. That does not prevent some priest from occasionally celebrating divine services in Rosendo's oratory; especially those created by the parishes or doctrines of Bishop Aresti in 1637; but the ecclesiastical hierarchy never decided to give its word on the miracle of Luján or to take up the veneration of the Holy Image with commitment, until Mrs. Ana de Matos intervened in the matter.”

=== Death and burial place (1686) ===
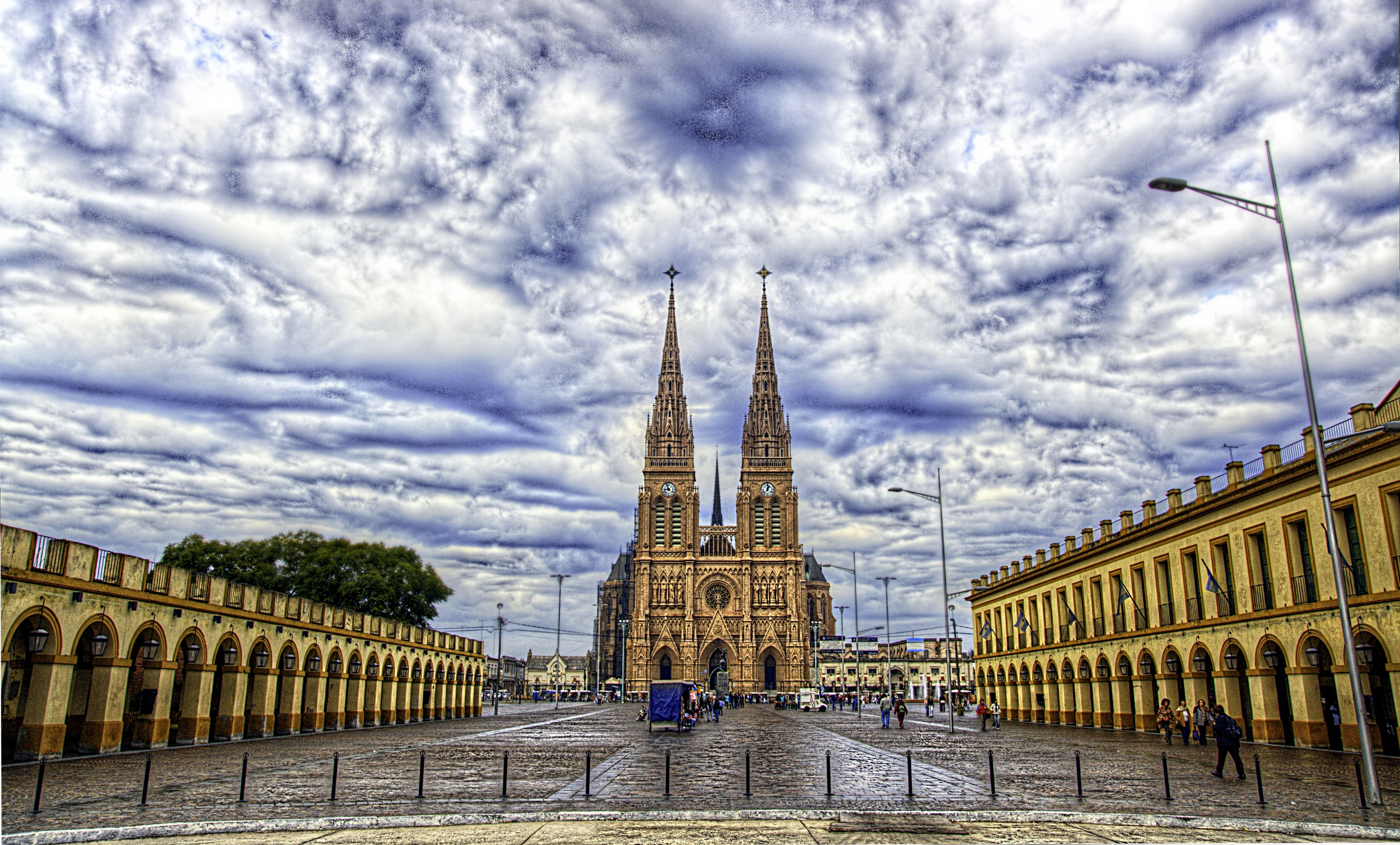
The now-defunct Montalvo Chapel operated until 1730 on the outskirts of the Basilica of Our Lady of Luján (pictured), which houses the remains of Ríos. Its exact location of the original chapel is uncertain

Ríos continued his duties as caretaker until mid-1686, when he died at approximately 82 years of age. Some chroniclers of the time, such as Pedro Nolasco, described Ríos as "dressed in a sackcloth that clung to his flesh and with a very long beard [like a hermit]," and Maqueda recounted that "he greatly helped in the continuation of the work on the Chapel, and afterwards continued in the service of the Virgin until advanced old age. While in his final illness, he said one day that his mistress had revealed to him that he would die on Friday and that the following Saturday she would take him to glory." Just as the Virgin had foretold, Manuel's death occurred on a Saturday. His remains were buried, like those of Fr Montalvo, beneath the main altar at the feet of the image of Luján in the chapel of Montalvo, built in 1685 on the outskirts of the Basilica of Our Lady of Luján.

The remains of the Montalvo chapel, which operated until approximately 1730, were thought to be located at the archaeological site known as Las Gárgolas. The Basilica of Our Lady of Luján, located opposite the site, was believed to have originated from this chapel. However, a 2021 archaeological investigation did not clearly and precisely locate any remains of the original chapel structures. One hypothesis gathered during the same investigation suggested that they might be located beneath the floors of the Basilica of Luján, across from the land owned by the Rossi Montero family.

== Legacy ==
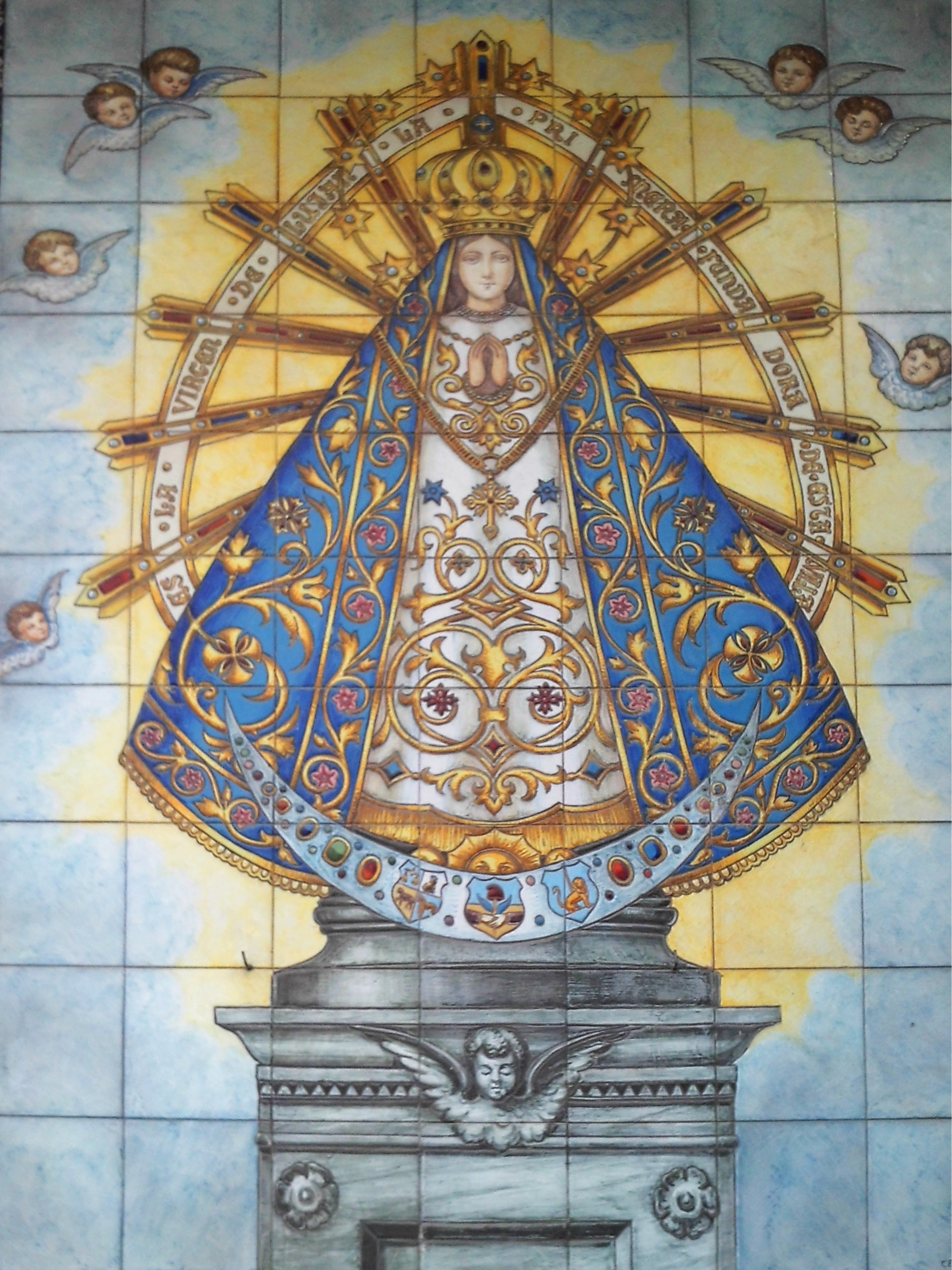
Tile of the Virgin of Luján in Seville, Spain.

According to Juan Guillermo Durán, "Black Manuel is an emblematic figure within the religious tradition related to Our Lady of Luján because he was a qualified witness to the miracle of the cart stopping." He is regarded as an example of Marian slavery and was one of the main promoters of the cult of Our Lady of Luján, who is now the patron saint of Argentina. At the same time, he played a fundamental role in the construction and maintenance of the first 17th-century chapel in honor of the Virgin of Luján. This led to the founding of the Basilica of Our Lady of Luján, the foundations of which were laid in 1890 by Fr Jorge María Salvaire.

On December 3, 1871, Msgr León Federico Aneiros led the first general pilgrimage of Catholics to Luján, in reparation for the unjust imprisonment of Pope Pius IX in Rome and in gratitude for the end of the yellow fever epidemic in Buenos Aires. In 1893, the pilgrimage of the country people to Luján was established as an annual event. At the end of September, crowds of people arrive annually on horseback, in groups and in carriages or modest sulkies from the Liniers train station.

Juan Guillermo Durán, a teacher, historian, and academic, published a book in 2019 titled Manuel Costa de los Ríos, Faithful Slave of the Virgin of Luján, in which he described Manuel's life. Durán was notified by the Congregation for the Causes of Saints that there were no impediments to initiating the cause for the beatification of Ríos, and Durán became the main proponent of the initiative in 2016, when the cause was officially opened in the Archdiocese of Mercedes-Luján. In 2022, sessions began to receive testimonies for the cause of beatification. That same year, a festival was held in his honor, Soy de la Virgen nomás ("I Belong Only to the Virgin") , featuring candombe music and artistic performances in Plaza Belgrano in Luján. Another biographical book, El espíritu de Manuel, de la Virgen de Luján ("The Spirit of Manuel, of the Virgin of Luján"), authored by Fr Sergio Gómez Tey, was published in 2022. A year earlier, the image of Ríos had been placed in the Casa Rosada during a Mass commemorating Afro-Argentine Day on November 8.

The site believed to have been the location of the Montalvo chapel, where the remains of Ríos were interred, was declared a National Historic Site by resolution no. 728 of the Secretariat of Culture in 1986 "to highlight these singular events in Argentine history". The declaration that was ratified by the National Executive Branch in 1989 through decree 325/89. In 2022, the Senate and the Chamber of Deputies of Buenos Aires declared the site to be of public utility and subject to expropriation. It was thereafter donated to the Archdiocese of Mercedes-Luján with the condition that a space be created there dedicated to the memory of the historical events that gave rise to the veneration of Our Lady of Luján.

== See also ==
- Our Lady of Luján
- Basilica of Our Lady of Luján
