= Jorge Salvaire =

Argentine Catholic priest (1847–1899)

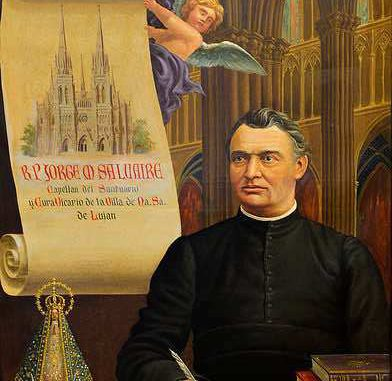
- Idealized fresco of Salvaire at the basilica in Luján
- Born: 6 January 1847; Castres, France
- Died: 4 February 1899 (aged 52); Luján, Argentina
- Other name: Georges Salvaire
- Occupation: Priest
- Known for: Beginning the construction of the Basilica of Our Lady of Luján; The publication of Historia de Nuestra Señora de Luján

Jorge María Salvaire (6 January 1847 – 4 February 1899) was a French-born Argentine Catholic priest. Salvaire was known for his studies of the following of Our Lady of Luján, including his 1885 publication of Historia de Nuestra Señora de Luján, and his commissioning of a large church in her name in the city of Luján, which would be completed in 1935.

After immigrating to Argentina in 1871, Salvaire underwent several evangelical missions in the frontier of Argentina, where he served as a translator and negotiator for several native leaders. After almost being killed in 1875, Salvaire, believing the Virgin of Luján saved his life, promised to build a church in her name. In the years after, he wrote a chronicle of her following, became the head of the parish at Luján, and proposed the construction of a large basilica in the city of Luján in order to serve the pilgrims there. In 1887, Salvaire oversaw the approval of the basilica's construction, as well as the blessing of the image of the Virgin of Luján. Salvaire laid the first stone of the church and led various institutional expansions of the facility while the basilica was under construction. Salvaire died in 1899, with construction of the basilica continuing until 1935.

== Early life ==
Salvaire was born on 6 January 1847, in the city of Castres in southern France. His father was a Spanish professor and a teacher of the fine arts, while his mother was from Cádiz, in Spain. Salvaire joined a seminary of the Lazarist congregation as a young adult. In 1871, he was ordained as a priest, and in the same year, emigrated to Buenos Aires, where a Lazarist branch had been established in the city twelve years earlier. He was joined by four members of the Society of Saint Vincent de Paul.

== Missions in Argentina ==
In 1874, Salvaire began a journey outside of Argentina to the frontier, occupied by native Indian tribes, in order to negotiate the release of several war captives, leaving Buenos Aires on 2 January. His mission was done at the request of León Federico Aneiros, a fellow priest who called for a campaign to convert the native tribes in the region to Catholicism. Aneiros had spoken with leaders of the Lazarist congregation to establish missions in the Argentine frontier. The mission began on 24 January of that year after Salvaire held a sermon in the town of Azul. Having learned the language of the tribes he came into contact with, he served as an interpreter for Adolfo Alsina and Ignacio Rivas in peace negotiations.

Initially, Salvaire was received badly by the natives, who believed that he was a spy for the Argentine government. While traveling to the main settlement of Manuel Namuncurá, a cacique, Salvaire was attacked by a group of natives with spears and was badly wounded. Salvaire's mission occurred during a time of increased mistrust between the Argentine government and the native population in the outskirts of the country, as the Argentine government had been conducting a slow campaign of conquest of lands historically owned by the Mapuche people.

After being blamed for the start of a disease outbreak, Salvaire was almost executed by a group of natives led by Namuncurá in the town of Carhué, however his life was spared by the brother of Namuncurá who protected him with his poncho and threatened any individuals who wished him harm. Having previously asked Our Lady of Luján for her intercession, he credited her for saving his life and promised in return to build a cathedral "worthy of her majesty" in her honor and document her life. Salvaire was eventually given his desired captives, as well as three horses and a woven poncho by Namuncurá as a gesture of goodwill.

Before returning to Buenos Aires, Salvaire also took part in the conversion and baptism of José María Railef, another cacique of an Araucan tribe in the Pampas, as well as the establishment of a spiritual mission on his territory. Salvaire had been appointed alongside Enrique Cescas, another priest, at the request of the Jose Salgado, who wrote to Aneiros, now the archbishop of Buenos Aires, in April 1874. After having been baptized in the presence of Salvaire, Railef had planned to travel to Buenos Aires to thank the archbishop, but instead remained in Luján due to poor health. Railef had already baptized his sons beforehand, between 1871 and 1873.

== Later life and death ==
In 1885, Salvaire anonymously published Historia de Nuestra Señora de Luján: Su Origen, Su Sanctuario, y Su Villa, a retelling of the stories of Our Lady of Luján during the colonial and independent eras of Argentina. His work also served as a response to criticism of the veracity of the story of Our Lady of Luján, and a wider connection of the Virgin of Luján to the establishment of the Argentine state. In his work, Salvaire copied all documents cited in his book by hand, resulting in them covering nearly half of the book. Today, these are the only surviving copies of many of these documents, as many were destroyed either through neglect or destruction as result of a fire in 1955. A significant amount of his work, especially his analysis during the 18th and early 19th centuries, was based on records from the city of Luján and the church itself. His work was described as one promoting the following around Our Lady of Luján, consistent with the doctrine of the Catholic Church in Argentina at the time.

=== Construction of the Basilica of Our Lady of Luján ===
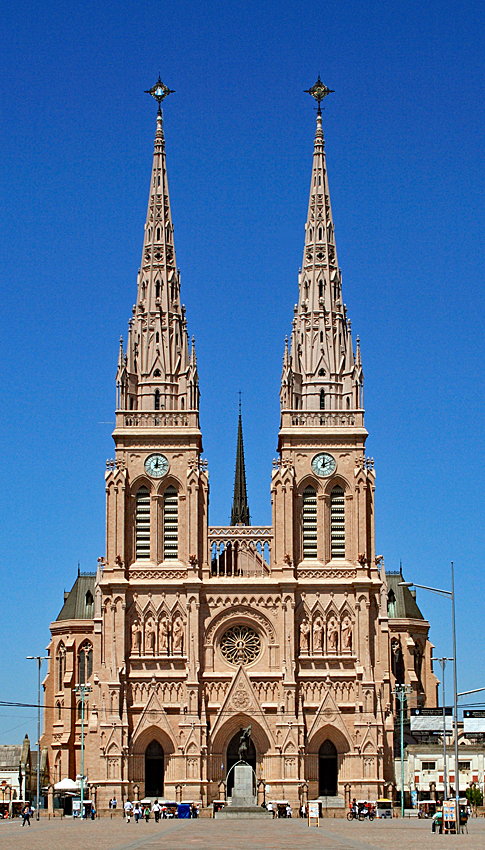
The basilica in 2008

Salvaire spent a year and a half serving at a church in Uruguay before being appointed the head of the parish at Luján in 1889, succeeding Jorge Révellière, who had provisionally held the role until Salvaire was able to assume the position. Salvaire advocated for the construction of a larger church in the city of Luján, which he argued would allow the city to better accommodate pilgrims to the site of Our Lady of Luján. In 1886, Salvaire traveled to Europe, where he received the jewels used on the crown of the Virgin of Luján from a donation in Paris. In December of that year, he met Pope Leo XIII in Rome. On 8 May 1887, Salvaire received approval from Pope Leo to construct a large basilica in the city. On the same day, Pope Leo blessed the image of the Virgin of Luján, which Salvaire had adorned with a twelve-star halo, an imperial crown and a Gothic stripe stating "This is the Virgin of Luján, the first founder of this village." This event was the first canonical coronation in the Americas. Enrique Udaondo estimated in 1939 that around 40,000 people attended the event. Seven days later, on 15 April, Salvaire personally laid the first stone of what would become the church.

Salvaire supported the construction of the church on the site of an original worship site in a Neogothic style. This was opposed by a second group arguing for the creation of a Roman-style church on a more easterly site, which would later become the Plaza Colón and the location of Luján's central government offices. Led primarily by the merchant class of the city and by Salvaire's religious predecessor, Emilio George, the latter group argued a different site would both preserve the old shrine and protect the basilica from floods, while Salvaire argued the original site of the temple should be chosen out of tradition. Salvaire's proposal was eventually chosen, which resulted in the original temple being demolished in 1904. His work was supported by the Catholic Church, which was at the time fighting increased secularization in Argentina. Funding for the church was provided by the Archdiocese of La Plata, as well as by donations from church members. Construction of the basilica formally began in 1890, led by French architect Uldéric Courtois. Due to a lack of materials near Luján for construction, Salvaire purchased a quarry near the city of Colón, Entre Ríos, where stone from the facility was transported by train to Luján via Buenos Aires. Within the city, Salvaire constructed brick kilns to make material for the site. Salvaire also traveled to Europe, primarily to secure funding and architects as well as the support of church members abroad.

Within the church, he established a hospital, a rest area for pilgrims, a magazine service, a college, and a women's conference. Salvaire died of a heart attack on 4 February 1899, at the age of 52, roughly 35 years before the basilica at Luján was completed. He was interred at the church.

== Legacy ==
The basilica would be inaugurated and consecrated in 1910, while still under construction. In 1935, shortly before the basilica's completion, a statue of Salvaire was erected on the west side of the church. The image of the Virgin of Luján was blessed by Pope John Paul II in 1998. In 2016, Archbishop of Buenos Aires Mario Aurelio Poli announced the beginning of the beatification process for Salvaire, which had been initially requested by Agustín Radrizzani, who served the Archdiocese of Mercedes-Luján.

The beginning of construction at the basilica in Luján considerably altered the development of the city, which saw an increase in pilgrims to the Basilica of Our Lady of Luján. This in turn led to an increase in transportation services to the city, as well as the displacement of traditional commercial sites near the church in favor of religious shops dedicated to tourists. This resulted in a division between the religious center of Luján and the remainder of the city. The basilica's construction also furthered the idea of Luján being a religious city by nature, which Salvaire had promoted in his earlier works.

Salvaire's Historia de Nuestra Señora de Luján and his general study of the history of the Virgin of Luján has been praised for its impact on future scholarly research into the subject, although it has also been considered limited in its scope due to a historical lack of available information. Juan Guillermo Durán, a priest and author of El Padre Jorge María Salvaire y la familia Pazos de Villa Nueva, praised Salvaire's work on the Basilica of Our Lady of Luján, and described Salvaire as "an austere man, with an expressive, frank and charming character", in an interview with Argentine newspaper La Nación.
