= Our Lady of Luján =

16th-century statue of the Virgin Mary in Argentina

- Details of the original statue, 1904

Virgin of Luján, Patroness of Argentina, Uruguay and Paraguay
- Venerated in: Roman Catholic Church
- Major shrine: Basilica of Luján, Argentina
- Feast: 8 May
- Attributes: Blessed Virgin Mary in prayer, golden crown, embroidered blue mantle over white robe, sliver of moon
- Patronage: Argentina and Argentine people, Uruguay, Paraguay, Roman Catholic Archdiocese of Mercedes-Luján, military chaplains

Our Lady of Luján (Spanish: Nuestra Señora de Luján) is a celebrated 17th-century statue of the Virgin Mary, mother of Jesus Christ. The image, also known as the Virgin of Luján (Spanish: Virgen de Luján), is on display in the Basilica of Luján in Argentina. The feast day of Our Lady of Luján is May 8.

== History ==
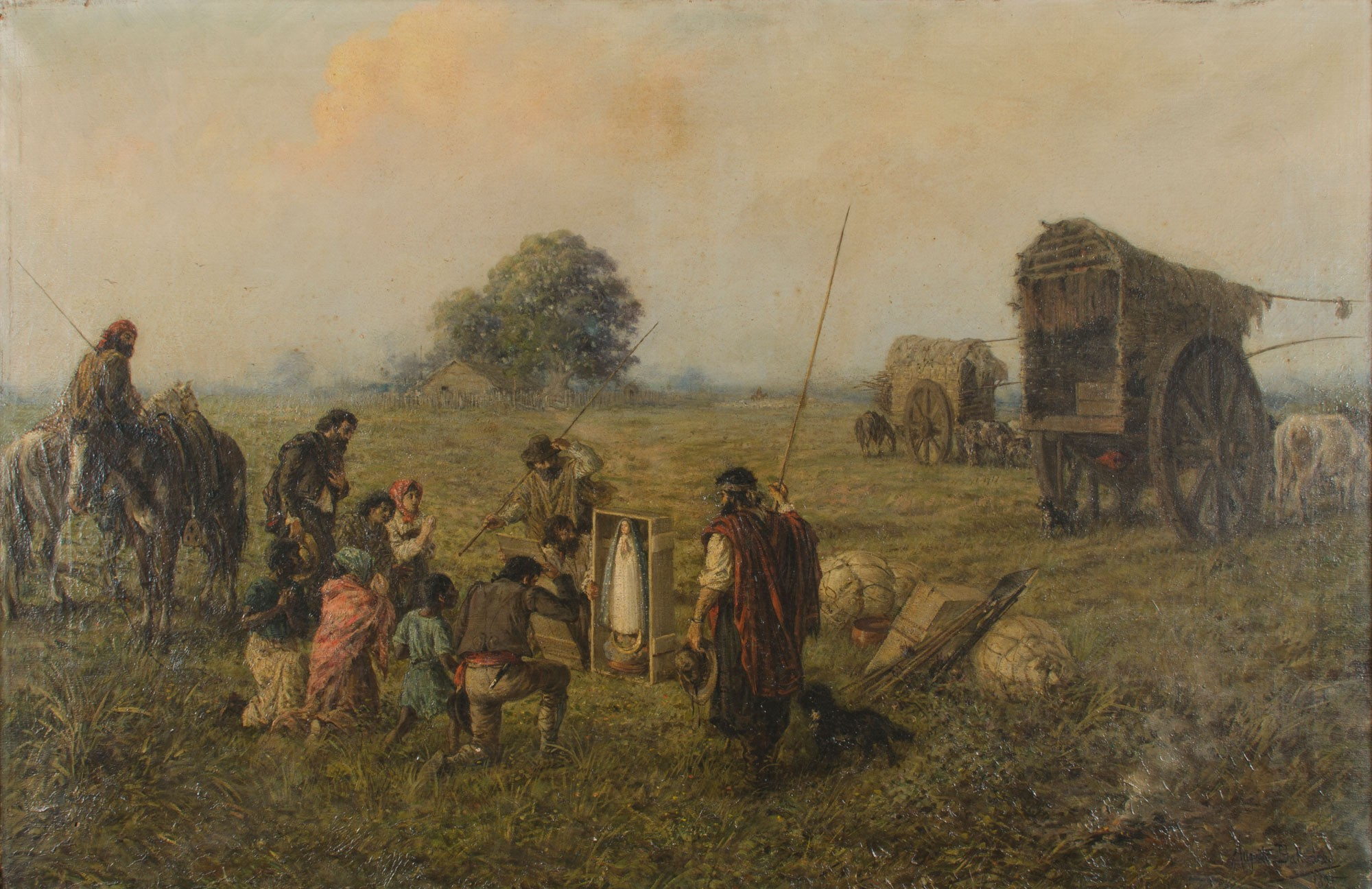
Miraculous Origin of Our Lady of Luján in the Year 1630, by Augusto Ballerini (1895).

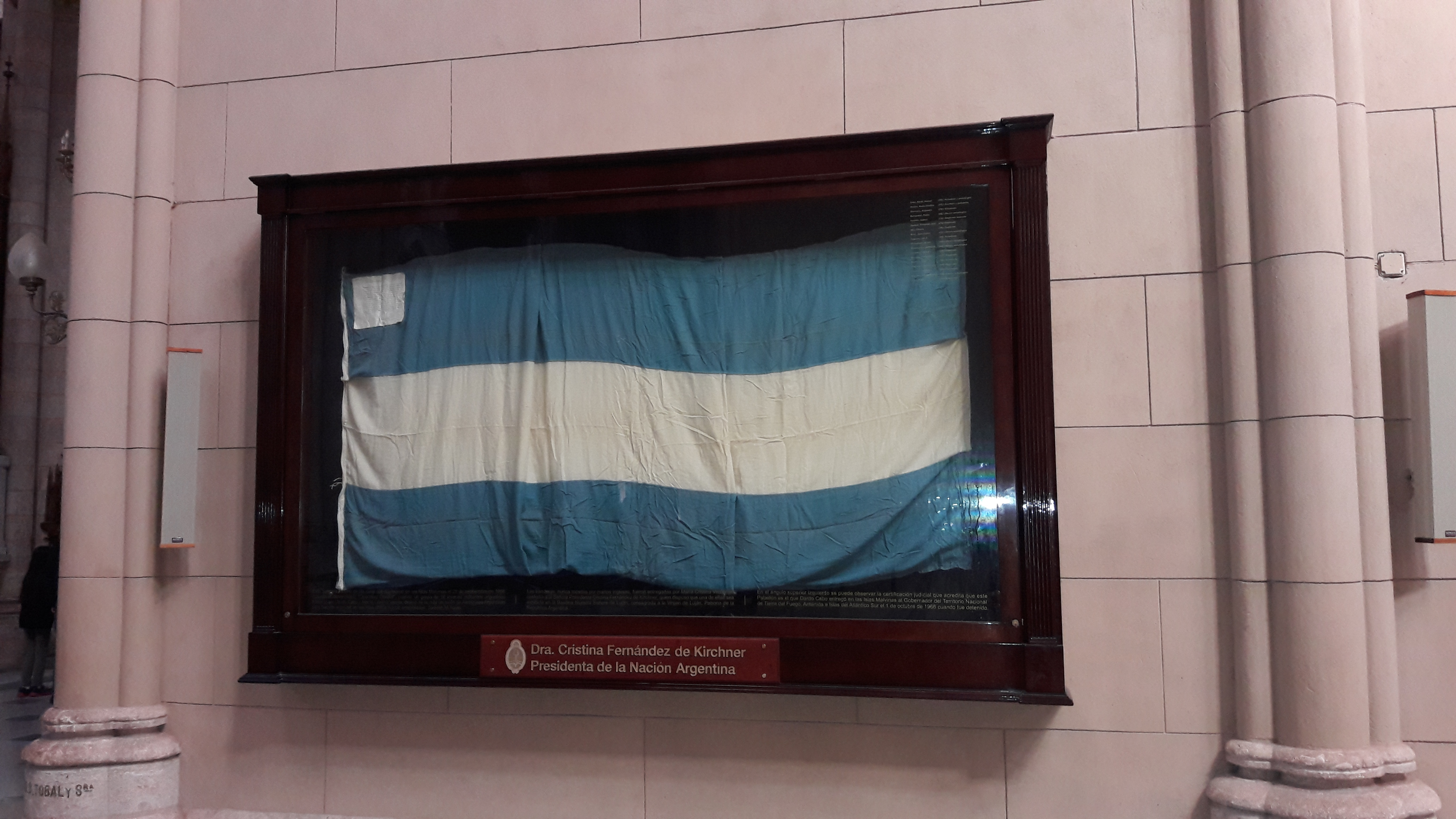
The Argentine flag from Operativo Cóndor at the Basilica of Our Lady of Luján, its colors represent the mantle of the Virgin Mary.

The Luján image was made in Brazil and sent to Argentina. Tradition holds that a settler ordered the terracotta image of the Immaculate Conception in 1630 because he intended to create a shrine in her honor to help reinvigorate the Catholic faith in Santiago del Estero, his region. After embarking from the port of Buenos Aires, the caravan carrying the image stopped at the residence of Don Rosendo Oramas, located in the present town of Zelaya.

When the caravan wanted to resume the journey, the oxen refused to move. Once the crate containing the image was removed, the animals started to move again. Given the evidence of a miracle, people believed the Virgin wished to remain there.

=== Chapel ===
Upon learning of the event in Buenos Aires, many residents came to venerate the image and, as the attendance grew, Rosendo de Trigueros had a chapel built for it where it remained from 1630 to 1674. In fact, today there exists on that site, known as the Place of the Miracle, a small house and chapel made of adobe and a dirt floor - which can be visited - that is reminiscent of the chapel that was built as the first sanctuary.

The image was called the Virgin Estanciera (Virgin of the Ranch) and the Patroncita Morena (Little Dark Patroness). A young black slave, Manuel Costa de los Ríos ("El Negro Manuel"), came with the caravan and witnessed what happened; upon seeing Manuel's love for the Virgin, the master assigned him to the exclusive care of the image, which he did until his death. He was in charge of the activities in the chapel and the clothing of the Virgin, directing the prayers of the pilgrims. When Rosendo de Trigueros died, his ranch was abandoned, but Manuel steadfastly continued the service that he had imposed on himself.

=== Transfer to Luján ===
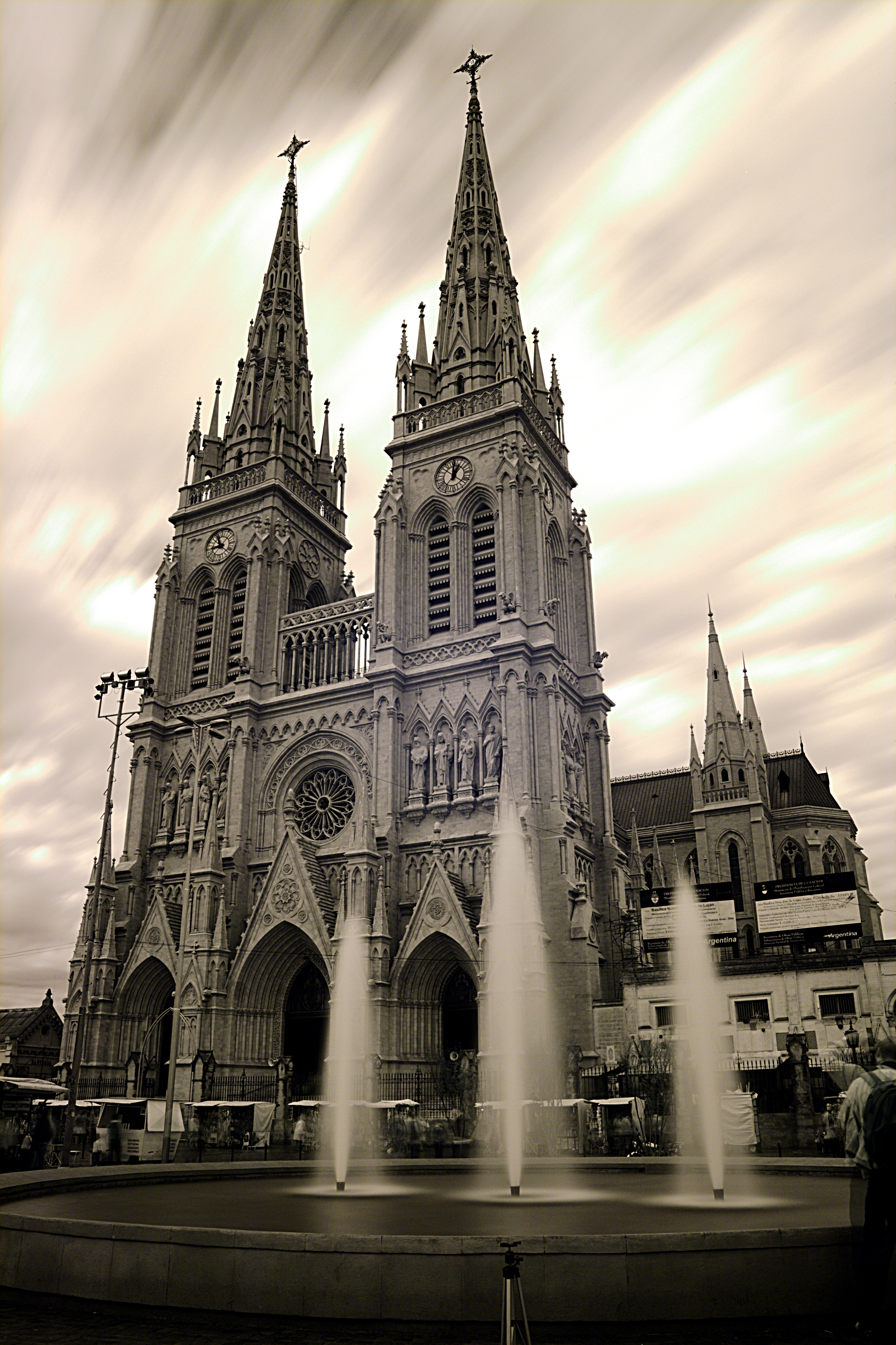
The Basilica of Our Lady of Luján.

Very concerned about the "loneliness of the Virgin" in that place that is now Zelaya, Ana de Matos, the widow of the Spanish captain Marcos de Sequeira and owner of a very well defended ranch located on the right bank of the Luján River, seeing no interest on the part of the civil and ecclesiastical authorities, asked the administrator of the ranch of the deceased Trigueros for the transfer of the image of the Virgin of Luján. She assured him of the care and construction of a "dignified and comfortable" chapel, facilitating the stay of the pilgrims. Juan de Oramas, the agent, accepted the offer and De Matos paid him for the transfer of the image.

Happy to have achieved her goal, she installed the image in her oratory, but the next morning, when she went there to pray, she discovered with astonishment and anguish that the Virgin was not on her altar. When she looked for it, she found it in the "Place of the Miracle".

It was initially believed that it was Costa himself, who had not been allowed to accompany the Virgin at first, who was taking the "Patroncita Morena" to her former home. He was even staked to the ground so that he could not steal the image. However, the image kept "returning" to its original place.

This happened several times until, upon learning of the event, considered miraculous by local Catholics, the Bishop of Buenos Aires, Friar Cristóbal de la Mancha y Velazco, O.P., and the governor of the Río de la Plata, José Martínez de Salazar, organized the transfer of the image, accompanied by Matos and Costa, who is now on the path to sainthood.

== Papal honors ==
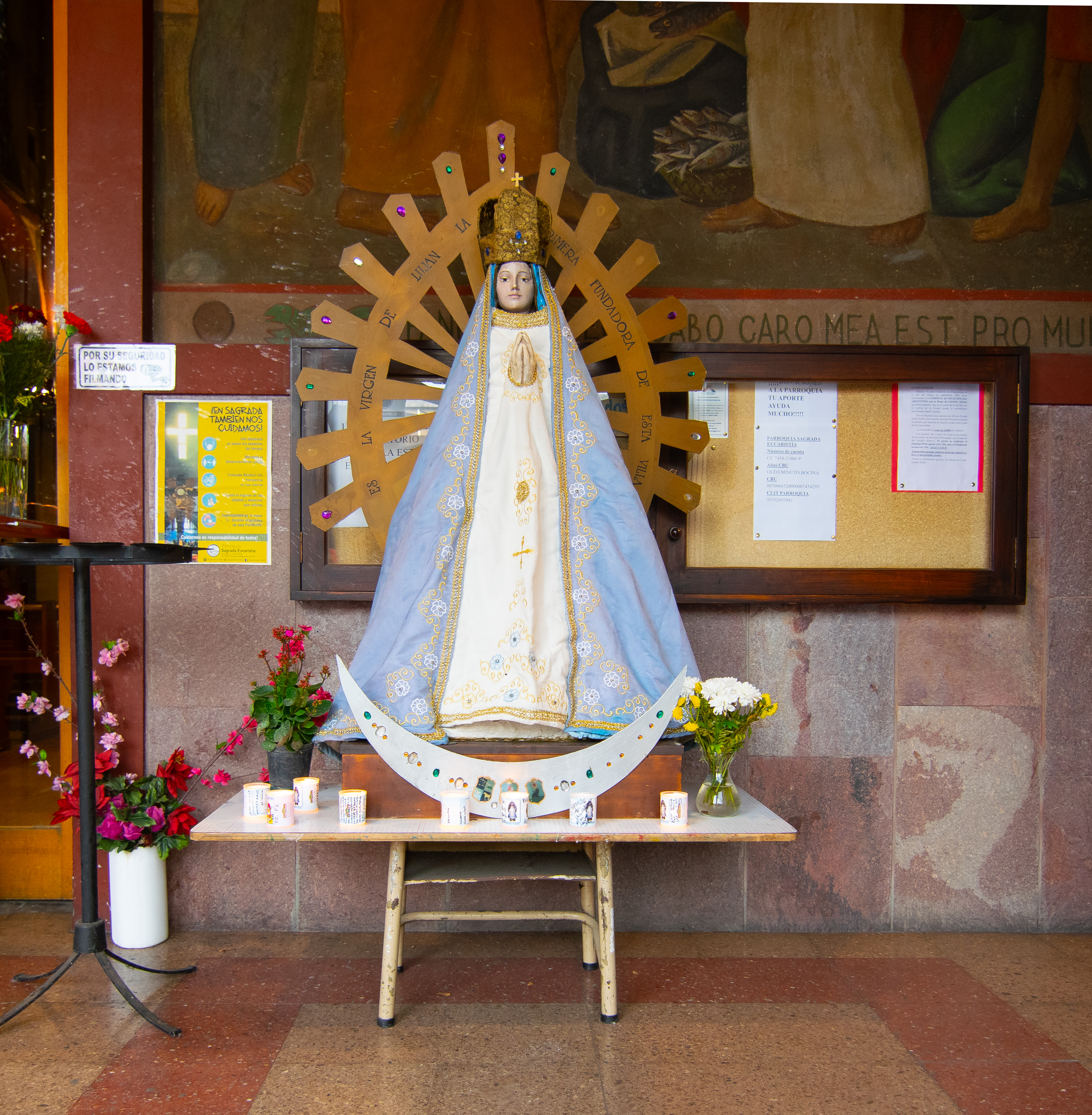
Statue of the Virgin of Luján at the Church of the Holy Eucharist in Palermo, Buenos Aires.

Among the Popes who have honored Our Lady of Luján are Clement XI, Clement XIV, Pius VI, Pius IX, Leo XIII, Pius XI, Pius XII, and John Paul II. In 1824, Fr. John Mastai Ferretti visited the shrine on his way to Chile. He later became Pope Pius IX and defined the dogma of the Immaculate Conception on December 8, 1854. Later, events in the 1898 Philippine Revolution, wherein the Philippines' Sun in their flag was based off the Incan god of Inti taken from the flags of Argentina, Paraguay, Peru, and Uruguay, has solidified Pope Pius IX gamble in support of the Immaculate Conception, since the same Masonic French Republic and Italian Republics that were inspired by the Masonic French and American Revolutions, that caused the fall of the Papal States and the imprisonment of Pope Pius IX, showed their lack of moral integrity, when the Americans and Frenchmen, despite having Revolutions via Freemasonry, betrayed their own founding ideals and signified their amorality when they destroyed the First Philippine Republic even though the First Philippine Republic was based on Masonic Rites and the Revolutionary ideals behind the American and French Revolutions. America and France conspired to destroy the Philippines in the Philippine-American War and Treaty of Paris (1898). This betrayal backstabbed a lot of Revolutionary Filipinos and many converted or reverted to Catholicsm. As a result, the Cerulean Indult, the privilege to wear the liturgical color of Cerulean or Celeste, in honor of the Immaculate Conception of Mary, a privilege, not shared by most other Latin-Rite Catholics, except those under the ambit of the Spanish Empire where it also doubly serves as the color of Native American Royalty even though the indult had initially fallen out of use due to wars of independence against Spain, the primary supporter of the Immaculate Conception, was restored to all former Spanish-territories following the First Provincial Council of Manila, due to the Philippines' population staying loyal, converting to, or reverting to Catholicism amidst the betrayal of the Americans plus French (Lying about supporting Philippine independence only to invade the country) amidst the transition from Spanish rule to American invasion.

Because of the reputation of the shrine, Pope Leo XIII decided in 1886 to honor the miraculous statue with a canonical coronation. On September 30 of that year, he blessed the crown, which was made of pure gold and set with 365 diamonds, rubies, emeralds and sapphires, 132 pearls and a number of enamels depicting the emblems of the Archbishop and the Argentine Republic. The papal coronation of Our Lady of Luján took place on May 8, 1887. The celebrant chosen by the Pope for this event was Archbishop León Federico Aneiros, who at the time made a pilgrimage in thanksgiving to Our Lady for sparing his archdiocese from an outbreak of cholera.

On 8 September 1930, Pope Pius XI formally declared Our Lady of Lujan as the Patroness of Argentina, Paraguay and Uruguay. The Papal document was signed by Cardinal Eugenio Pacelli, the future Pope Pius XII.

Cardinal Eugenio Pacelli served as the Papal Legate to the XXXII International Eucharistic Congress held in Buenos Aires in October 1934, and visited the Basilica on October 15. When he became Pope Pius XII, he made a radio address to the pilgrims in Luján on the occasion of the First Marian Congress in Argentina in 1947.

In 1982, during the Falklands War, John Paul II became the first pope to visit Our Lady of Luján. During this visit the Pope celebrated an outdoor Mass in the square of the Basilica of Our Lady of Luján and bestowed upon her the Golden Rose. Both in his homily of June 11 and his Angelus back in Rome reflecting on the trip, he commented on Our Lady's never failing maternal solicitude for the faithful in times of distress. Sixteen years later in Rome, John Paul II gave a replica of the image to the Argentine National Parish during his pastoral visit there.

== The Golden Rose ==
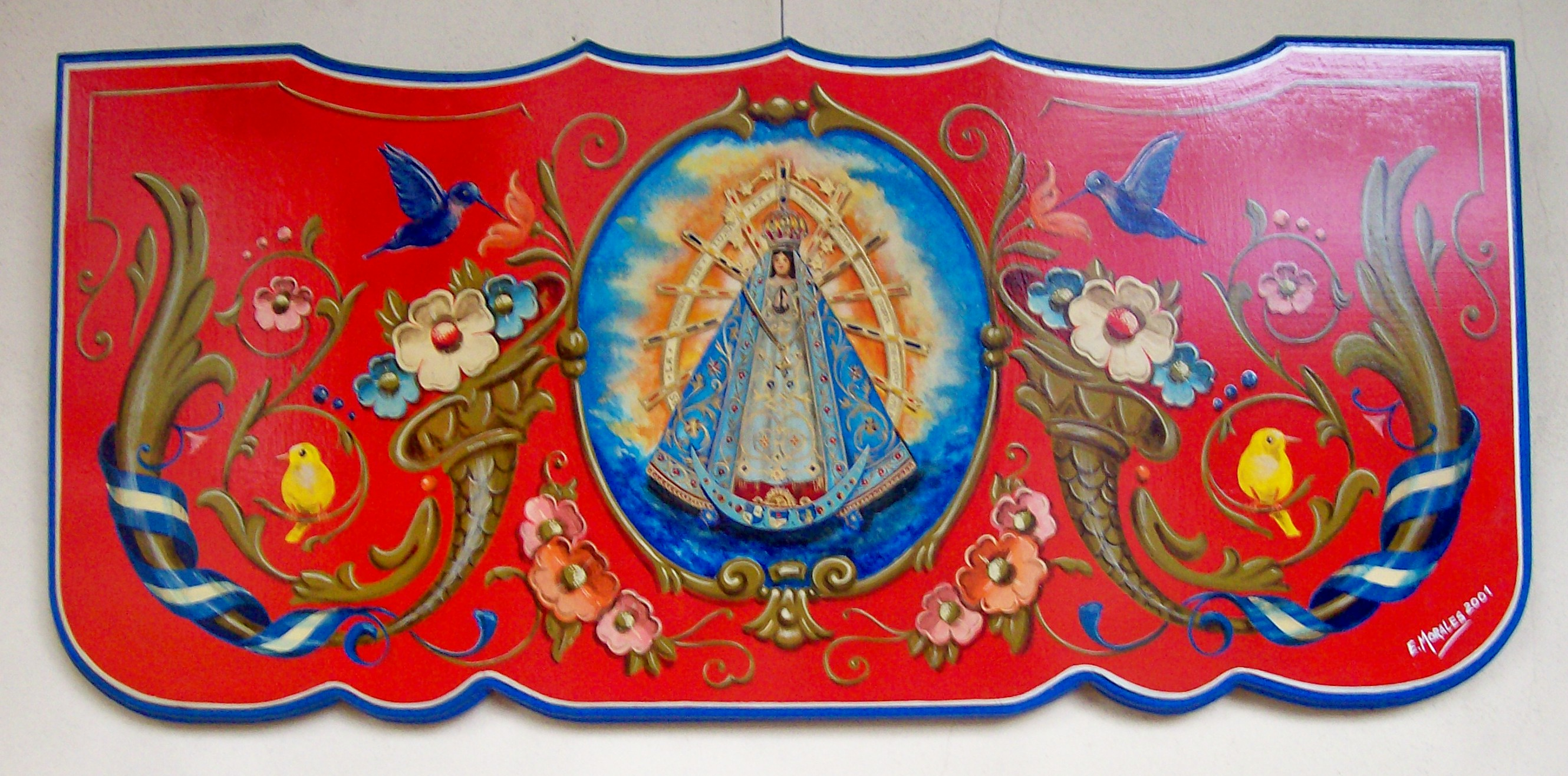
Fileteado image of Our Lady of Luján by Edgardo Morales (2001).

In the Americas, the Golden Rose, a papal award given to outstanding structures and individuals, has been given to Our Lady of Guadalupe in Mexico, to Our Lady of Aparecida in Brazil, to St. Joseph's Oratory in Canada, to the Basilica of the National Shrine of the Immaculate Conception in the United States, to the Cathedral Basilica of Nuestra Señora del Valle in Argentina and to the Basílica Santuario Nacional de Nuestra Señora de la Caridad del Cobre in Cuba. On June 11, 1982, John Paul II personally bestowed a Golden Rose on Our Lady of Luján while visiting Argentina.

== See also ==
- Ahí tienes a tu madre (film)
- Basilica of Our Lady of Luján
- Blessed Virgin Mary
- Maravilla Americana
- Marian apparitions
- Penance
- Pope Francis
- Roman Catholicism
