= Mariano José de Escalada =

Argentine archbishop (1799-1870)

- Archbishop emeritus of Buenos Aires
- Drawing of Escalada
- Archdiocese: Buenos Aires
- Installed: 1865
- Term ended: 29 July 1870
- Predecessor: Mariano Medrano
- Successor: León Federico Aneiros

Orders
- Ordination: 1822 (Priest)
- Consecration: 18 November 1855 (Bishop)

Personal details
- Born: 26 November 1799 Buenos Aires, Viceroyalty of the Río de la Plata
- Died: 29 July 1870 (aged 70) Rome, Papal States
- Denomination: Roman Catholic Church

Mariano José de Escalada Bustillo y Zeballos (26 November 1799 - 29 July 1870) was an Argentine Catholic archbishop who served as the bishop of Buenos Aires between 1855 and 1865, and the diocese's first archbishop from 1865 until his death in 1870. Escalada became the diocese's auxiliary bishop in 1835 and its bishop in 1855, both times facing opposition from the Argentine government. While serving as bishop and archbishop, he attempted to maintain the power of the church, while also opposing freemasonry and gallicanism, with debate over the former possibly having delayed liberalization between church and state in Argentina. Escalada died in Rome while attending the First Vatican Council.

== Early life and career ==
Escalada was born on 26 November 1799 into a wealthy Buenos Aires family. One of his cousins, María de los Remedios de Escalada, became the wife of José de San Martín, an Argentine general who helped secure the country's independence from Spain. He was ordained as a priest in 1822. In September 1830, Escalada accompanied Mariano Medrano, the future bishop of the Archdiocese of Buenos Aires on a trip to Rio de Janeiro for the latter to receive a papal consecration. In October 1831, Medrano appointed Escalada as the diocese's vicar general.

Due to Medrano's poor health, he was advised to suggest an auxiliary bishop to assist him in his role. Escalada was among the several men listed as potential candidates for the position. In 1832, Escalada was appointed as the auxiliary bishop of the Diocese of Buenos Aires by Pope Gregory XVI, however the Argentine government refused his appointment, citing, among other reasons, Escalada's withholding of several papal bulls related to his appointment and the lack of an official nomination from the government. Escalada appealed this decision shortly after, with him not being permitted to assume the rule until April 1835, when it was approved by Juan Manuel de Rosas. In March 1834, Escalada resigned from his position as a vicar general. The same year, Escalada was appointed bishop of the titular see of Aulon. Escalada was a supporter of the Jesuits, however the group was expelled from Argentina in 1843 by order of Rosas. Escalada was viewed negatively by the Argentine government for his support of the group, and Ignacio Martínez wrote that he "spent his days between confinement in his house and self-imposed exile at his family's country estate".

Escalada served as a critical point of contact with an apostolic nunciature in Rio de Janeiro, largely due to his location in Buenos Aires being the first point of departure for news from the Holy See bound for Rio. Alongside Castro Barros, another priest based in Uruguay, the two exchanged letters with members of the nunciature, discussing the appointments of clergy members and the status of the church in their respective countries. This position was disrupted on Escalada's end in the early 1840s as he began to face opposition from Rosas.

== Archbishop of Buenos Aires ==
Mariano Medrano, then-bishop of Buenos Aires, died in 1851. Three years later in March 1854, Escalada was nominated by the governor of Buenos Aires to succeed him. Following his approval by the Pope, Escalada requested the release of an exequatur, a document recognizing the legitimacy of the church's actions, from the governor, however this action was challenged by a Buenos Aires court as the bull issued by the Pope did not mention his approval by the Argentine government. The government of Buenos Aires also wanted Escalada to swear an oath submitting to their laws. Escalada agreed to a compromise, agreeing to follow all laws that "in no way oppose the laws of God and the Church". The government accepted this, as allowing Escalada to serve as bishop would weaken the position of Justo José de Urquiza, who was attempting to divide the jurisdiction of the diocese of Buenos Aires. Escalada assumed the role of bishop on 18 November 1855. In 1865, following the issuance of a papal bull by Pope Pius IX, the ecclesiastical province of Buenos Aires was elevated to the status of an archdiocese, making Escalada the first archbishop of Buenos Aires. As part of the elevation, his original role as bishop of the diocese was retired and he was required to swear loyalty to the Argentine state, alongside a promise to not accept a foreign title without government approval.

During his time as bishop and later archbishop, Escalada approved the construction of eighteen new churches in his diocese and wrote multiple pastoral letters. In Buenos Aires, Escalada chose to defer ownership of the city's seminary to the Jesuits. Between 1856 and 1863, Escalada made multiple visits to a Dominican monastery where he issued multiple orders to the group, including the appointment of "Council Mothers" and a ban on the nuns of the monastery from reading the newspaper. He also required members of clergy to attend lectures on morals every three months and for them to engage in "spiritual exercises". In 1856, Escalada replaced all positions in cathedrals held by members of the Catholic laity with members of clergy.

Escalada opposed gallicanism and sought to align the church closer to the Holy See while maintaining a distinction between church and state. This brought him into conflict with some members of clergy and the elite, where spiritual matters were delegated to the Pope and legal matters to the secular state. Escalada also faced legal action against two priests, Domenico Migliorucci and Cesáreo Gonzalez, who claimed that Escalada was governing the diocese "despotically". Both utilized El Nacional and La Tribuna, two Buenos Aires newspapers, to present their arguments.

Escalada also staunchly opposed Freemasonry, writing a November 1855 pastoral letter declaring the group incompatible with Catholicism. Another letter written by Escalada in February 1857 declared that any Catholic who joined a masonic lodge would be guilty of apostasy and face excommunication. In September 1858, Escalada ordered the parish priest of the city of San Miguel to not hold a funeral for Juan Musso due to his status as a freemason, despite him having been a devout Catholic. His actions led to significant debate in Argentina, alongside attacks targeting the homes of priests, while his 1857 letter is considered to have placed Freemasons at odds with both the church and the Jesuits. The conflict is considered to have delayed the liberalization of the relationship between church and state in Argentina due to desires from Escalada and his supporters to maintain power. Many Freemasons attempted to remain members of both groups, with some managing to receive Catholic funerals upon their death, against the wishes of Escalada.

In 1870, Escalada, alongside three other Argentine bishops, traveled to Rome to take part in the First Vatican Council. While there, he died unexpectedly on 29 July, making him one of four Latin Americans to have died while attending the council. A cabildo was called in September of that year to appoint a new archbishop, leading to him being succeeded by León Federico Aneiros. His body was repatriated to Argentina a year later. Escalada was buried in the Regina Martyrum Church in Buenos Aires, located on land owned by his family which Escalada had set aside for the creation of a seminary. His name, alongside all other Argentine priests who attended the First Vatican Council, is engraved on Saint Peter's Basilica in the Vatican.

Catholic Church titles
Preceded by Title created	Archbishop of Buenos Aires; 1865-1870	Succeeded by León Federico Aneiros
