= Ahí tienes a tu madre =

- Directed by: Leandro Borrell
- Written by: Leandro Borrell; Pedro Peñalba
- Produced by: Leandro Borrell
- Starring: Robert Ayambilla; Teresa Barceló
- Cinematography: Juan Mandarano
- Edited by: Leandro Borrell
- Music by: Adrián Charras
- Release date: March 2004
- Running time: 63 minutes
- Countries: Argentina; Spain; Canada
- Language: Spanish

Ahí tienes a tu madre is a 2004 Argentine film directed and written by Leandro Borrell. The film starred Robert Ayambilla and Teresa Barceló.

== Cast ==
- Robert Ayambilla as Negro Manuel joven
- Teresa Barceló as Ana de Matos
- Alberto D'Angelo as Juan
- Rubén De Virgilio as Bernabé González
- Mirta Fissore Andrea as María
- Mauro Gómez as Joaquín
- Rubén Insaurralde as Don Felipe
- Pablo Sosa as Negro Manuel viejo
- Jorge Vilaltella as Padre Pedro Montalbo
- Mario Zacarías as Maestro Oramas

== Release and acclaim ==
The film premiered in March 2004 at the Mar del Plata Film Festival.

== See also ==
- Our Lady of Luján
