= Plaza Belgrano =

Argentinian plaza

The Plaza Belgrano is a plaza located in San Miguel de Tucumán, Argentina. It was the location of the battle of Tucumán during the Argentine Wars of Independence.

== History ==
Initially known as "Campo de las carreras", the plaza was the site of the battle of Tucumán on September 24, 1812, a victory of Manuel Belgrano over Pío Tristán during the Argentine War of Independence. José de San Martín ordered the construction of a fort in 1814. Manuel Belgrano, owner of a part of terrains at the time, ordered the construction of a pyramid in recognition of San Martín's victory at the battle of Chacabuco, during his campaign in Chile. The actual plaza was created in 1858 and laid out in 1872.

The Plaza Independencia had a statue of Manuel Belgrano, crafted by Francisco Cafferata. This statue was moved to the Plaza Belgrano in 1904. The plaza was declared "national historic place" on July 12, 1941.
