= Zelaya, Buenos Aires =

Coordinates: 34°21′38″S 58°52′36″W

Zelaya, Province of Buenos Aires
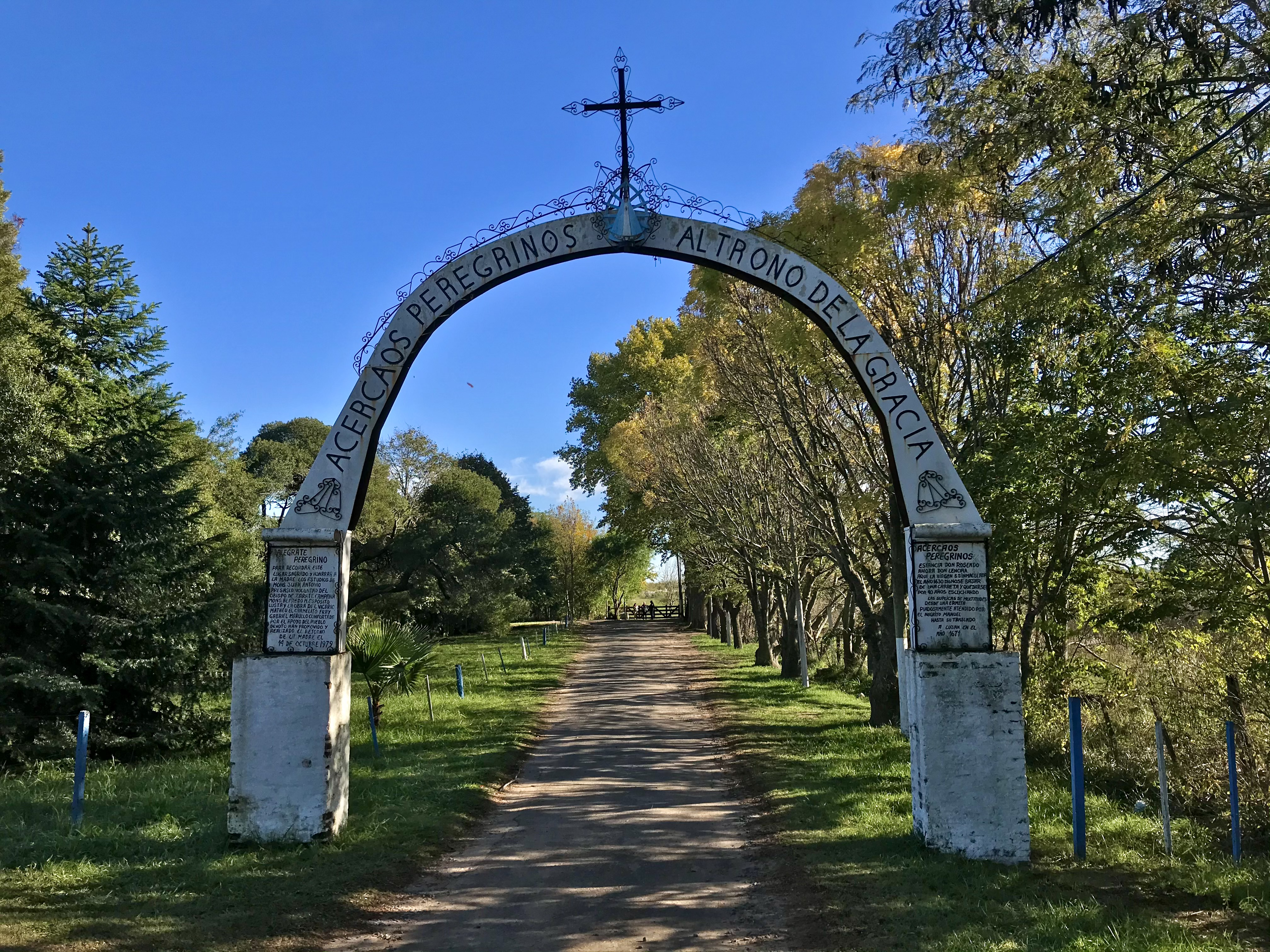
- The Place of the Miracle of Our Lady of Lujan
- Interactive map of Zelaya, Province of Buenos Aires
- Country: Argentina
- Province: Buenos Aires Province
- Partido: Pilar

Government
  - Intendant: Federico de Achával (FpV)
- Elevation: 195 m (640 ft)

Population (2010 census [INDEC])
  - Total: 2,641
- CPA Base: B 1627
- Area code: +54 0348
- Website: www.pilar.gov.ar

Zelaya is a small town in the partido of Pilar, Province of Buenos Aires, in Argentina. It borders the partidos of Escobar and Campana. Zelaya has a total population of 2,641 inhabitants. It is where The Miracle of Our Lady of Lujan took place.

== History ==
Zelaya was founded in 1829, under the rule of Juan Manuel de Rosas, and was a paraje or a rural area with a disperse population at various estancias or farmhouses. In 1630, there had occurred the miracle of Our Lady of Luján, near the River Luján, at the Trigueros Rosendo estancia.

=== The Place of the Miracle of Our Lady of Lujan ===
A Portuguese immigrant farmer was saddened by the lack of Christianity around his farm and decided to build a chapel to promote his faith. He wrote to Brazil for a statue of the Virgin Mary. The merchant sent both a Madonna and Child statue and one of Mary as the Immaculate Conception. After landing at the port of Buenos Aires, the images meant for Sumampa (Santiago del Estero), stopped at the residence of Don Rosendo, located in the present town Zelaya. The next day, the caravan attempted to resume the journey, but the oxen pulling the cart containing the images refused to move. After some time, the images were removed from the cart and the animals obeyed commands to walk on. The people involved saw this as evidence of a miracle and an indication that the Virgin Mary wished to remain there. The image of the Immaculate Conception stayed there and was venerated in a primitive chapel for 40 years. The image was then acquired by Ana de Matos and carried to Lujan, where the image currently resides. In the original location of the miracle, there is still a shrine dedicated to the Immaculate. Inside a small chapel on that farm there is a modest shrine with a replica statue of the Immaculate Conception.(1)

=== Railway Station ===
branch to Victoria Vagues, slice Zelaya Victoria Station (formerly Copello Station) comprised 33.7 kilometers of track, opening to the public service was held on April 30, 1892 (the first Pilar's Party station) and the extension of Zelaya in Capilla del Señor (23, 4 km) on 20 July of the same año. Recién the July 5, 1894 was fought to the service from Capilla del Señor San Antonio de Areco (32, 2 km.) and was ligated with the way San Antonio de Areco - Reef - Parchment, whose administration exercised by the government of the province of Buenos Aires by concession granted on 1 July 1881 and empowerment had made a beginning on 30 August 1882.

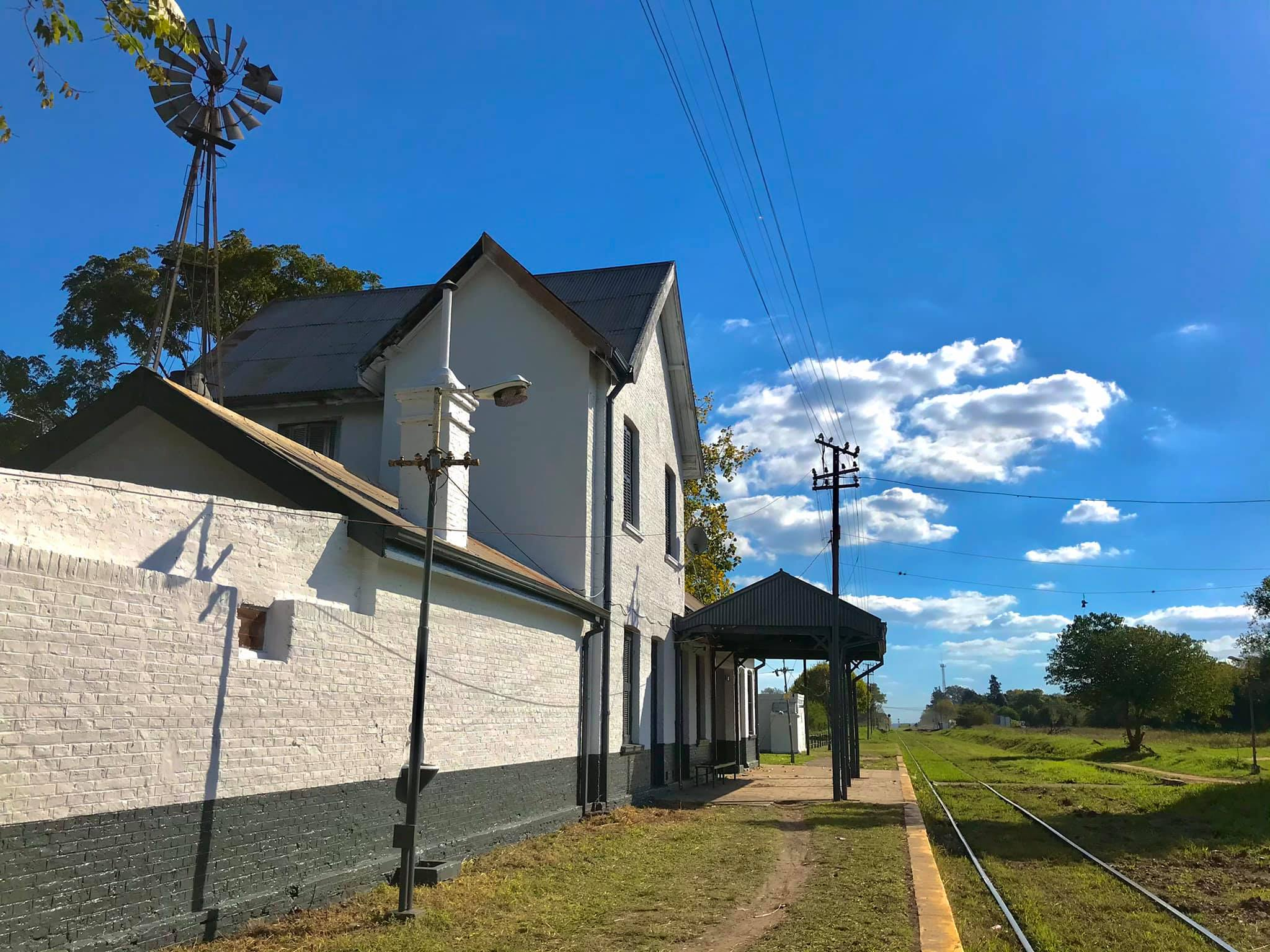
Zelaya Railway Station.

At the opening of stretch-Zelaya Victoria is set to 44 km station Garin, on the other hand in a rail network map published in 1895 can clearly see the layout of railway junction station Victoria stations only Garin, Zelaya and Chapel of the Lord. When the Ferrocarril General Bartolomé Mitre railway was operated by Argentines spent more than 80 train loads and long distance commuter who went to the provinces of Santa Fe and Cordoba. There was daily services to Retreat, Victoria, Lord's Chapel, Parchment, Casilda, Venado Tuerto, Corral de Bustos, and Rio Cuarto Rio Tercero in 1995 when the former concessionaire Trenes addresses to Capilla del Senor Zelaya station closes its doors and becomes a train stop.
