= León Federico Aneiros =

Argentine archbishop (1826–1894)

- Archbishop emeritus of Buenos Aires
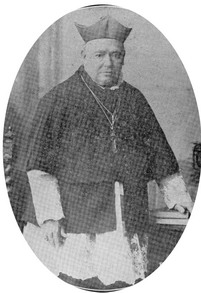
- Aneiros, late 19th century
- Archdiocese: Buenos Aires
- Installed: 25 July 1873
- Term ended: 1894
- Predecessor: Mariano José de Escalada
- Successor: Uladislao Castellano

Orders
- Ordination: 1848 (Priest)
- Consecration: 25 July 1873 (Archbishop)

Personal details
- Born: 28 June 1826 Buenos Aires, United Provinces of the Río de la Plata
- Died: 3 September 1894 (aged 68) Buenos Aires, Argentina
- Denomination: Roman Catholic Church
- Education: Colegio de San Ignacio

León Federico Aneiros (28 June 1826 – 3 September 1894) was an Argentine Catholic priest who served as the archbishop of Buenos Aires between 1873 and 1894. Born in Buenos Aires, Aneiros was ordained a priest in 1848, and became a faculty member at two universities in the city. In government, he served as a Buenos Aires legislator for several years. As archbishop, Aneiros attempted to reverse the trend of secularization in Argentina, and got into legal conflicts with the governments of Argentina and the city of Buenos Aires. He oversaw several missions to convert the native population of Argentina, as well as the construction of a large basilica in the city of Luján. He served as archbishop until his death in 1894.

== Early life and career ==
Aneiros was born on 28 June 1826 in the city of Buenos Aires. He was baptized Federico Indalecio at birth. His father, Tomás Aneiros, was an immigrant from Spain, while his mother, Antonia Salas, was from the Province of Buenos Aires. Aneiros attended the Colegio de San Ignacio, a Jesuit college in Buenos Aires, where he received a doctorate in theology in 1846. In 1848, Aneiros was ordained as a priest. In 1853, Aneiros founded a newspaper called La Religión. From 1854 to 1870 or 1871, Aneiros taught canon law at the University of Buenos Aires. He also briefly served as vice-rector of the Colegio Nacional de Buenos Aires in 1864, but resigned after a few months. In May 1854, Aneiros became a deputy of the Provincial Legislation of Buenos Aires, a position from which he resigned in 1856. His work in government was unusual for priests of the time, as most did not occupy representative positions.

== Missions in Argentina ==
Aneiros supported a plan to convert the native population of Argentina, writing a letter in March 1872 to Nicolás Avellaneda, then-Minister of Justice and Education and later president, arguing for the establishment of spiritual missions in their territory. On 3 December 1872, Aneiros established the Consejo para las Misiones de los Indios, who would create missions in the Pampas. Following the presentation of a bill by Avallaneda in support of his plan, Aneiros wrote to the Lyon-based Superior Council for the Propagation of the Faith requesting assistance in establishing missions in November of that year. Aneiros also wrote to a French Lazarist group, which established a mission in Argentina in 1874 and sent two priests, Fernando Meistre and Jorge Salvaire. Aneiros visited the frontier town of Azul in November 1873 and established a mission there. Meistre and Salvaire arrived in the town in January of the following year.

In April 1874, after receiving a request from a priest in Bragado, Aneiros sent Salvaire and another Lazarist priest to convert the population of a tribe controlled by cacique José Railef, who himself converted in August of that year following their arrival. In 1876, Aneiros sent two more men to establish missions in the Pampas, this time in a region around the Río Negro. In 1879, Aneiros sent three missionaries to join Argentine general Julio Argentino Roca during his campaign to conquer native territory. The group baptized nearly 50 natives, including thirteen children. Aneiros himself took part in various missions across Argentina from 1871 until shortly before his death, visiting numerous communities across the Pampas.

== Archbishop of Buenos Aires (1873–1894) ==
In 1855, Aneiros was made secretary of the bishopric by Mariano José de Escalada, then-archbishop of Buenos Aires. In 1870, following a request from Escalada, who was in Rome at the time, Aneiros was declared the Bishop of Aulon. Escalada died of disease in 1870, while still in Rome. On 11 September of that year, Aneiros was made vicar capitular of the archdiocese. Initially, Mamerto Esquiú was to be designated archbishop, however he refused the role and wrote a letter to Pope Pius IX requesting Aneiros be made archbishop instead. On 25 July 1873, Aneiros was promoted by the Pope as the archbishop of Buenos Aires. While serving as archbishop, Aneiros again worked as a provincial deputy between 1874 and 1878.

On 28 February 1875, two years after Aneiros' accession as archbishop, a violent anti-Catholic riot occurred in Buenos Aires. The rioters burned the Colegio del Salvador, allegedly made anti-Jesuit chants and called for the death of Aneiros. A group of 50 rioters attempted to storm a parish house in the neighborhood of Flores, where Aneiros had taken refuge. The riots of 1875 are considered to have been a contributing factor in the trend of anti-liberalism among some Catholics. As a result of this, Aneiros gained support among the Catholic clergy, with Miranda Lida writing that the riots "rallied the entire clergy behind the archbishop, who in this way saw his authority consolidated, even in a moral sense".

As archbishop, Aneiros attempted to combat the trend of liberalism and secularization occurring in Argentina at the time. In 1879, Aneiros wrote a letter to the church in Rome requesting a group of men to serve the religious needs of the Irish population in Argentina, arguing that they were "undergoing a great change in their customs and ideas and this change, particularly among the young of both sexes, is causing serious alarm for their spiritual good." In 1883, at his suggestion, the Catholic Association was founded, with the goal of creating unity among church members and opposing secularization. By 1884, the group had over 600 members in Buenos Aires. Aneiros also expanded the number of parishes in the countryside, founding fifteen, the most of any archbishop.

In Luján, a major Argentine religious center, Aneiros organized a major pilgrimage to the city, the first of its kind, in 1871, partly to protest the imprisonment of Pope Pius IX in Rome, as well as to celebrate the end of a yellow fever outbreak. In 1872, before becoming archbishop, Aneiros took control of both the major shrine in the city and the town church. Sixteen years later, in November 1887, Aneiros authorized the construction of the Basilica of Our Lady of Luján, which had initially been proposed by Jorge Salvaire. In January 1890, Aneiros wrote a pastoral letter calling for church members to support the project. The project was criticized by some, due to it having been approved during an economic crisis in the country.

During his tenure as archbishop, Aneiros fought against the Argentine Supreme Court on issues of religious authority, primarily in response to the Federalization of Buenos Aires and the question of church authority over legal matters. Aneiros and his supporters were largely successful, with a Buenos Aires case ruling in favor of church independence in 1885. In 1886, a case against Aneiros supported by then-president Julio Argentino Roca was brought before the Supreme Court, which also ended favorably for him. In July of the same year, Aneiros faced legal action brought by Juan de Dios Arenas, a former priest whom Aneiros had dismissed. Due to a lack of intervention by the Argentine court, Aneiros was not required to make any concessions to Arenas. Aneiros later threatened Arenas with excommunication, despite earlier restrictions against the practice promulgated by Pius IX. In Asunción, Paraguay, which at the time was under the administration of the Archdiocese of Buenos Aires, Aneiros attempted to establish Mariano Antonio Espinosa, an Argentine, as the region's vicar in 1876 following the War of the Triple Alliance, as he wanted the role to be filled by a non-Paraguayan. His promotion, however, was rejected by the Paraguayan government.

While traveling to Bragado on a spiritual mission in August 1894, Aneiros became ill with influenza. He returned to Buenos Aires in early September, but did not recover. Aneiros died on 3 September 1894. His body was embalmed by César Milone and Avelino Gutiérrez.

Catholic Church titles
Preceded by Mariano José de Escalada	Archbishop of Buenos Aires; 1873–1894	Succeeded by Uladislao Castellano
