= Basilica of Our Lady of Luján =

Church in Buenos Aires, Argentina

Basilica of Luján
- Minor Basilica of Our Lady of Luján
- Basílica Menor de Nuestra Señora de Luján
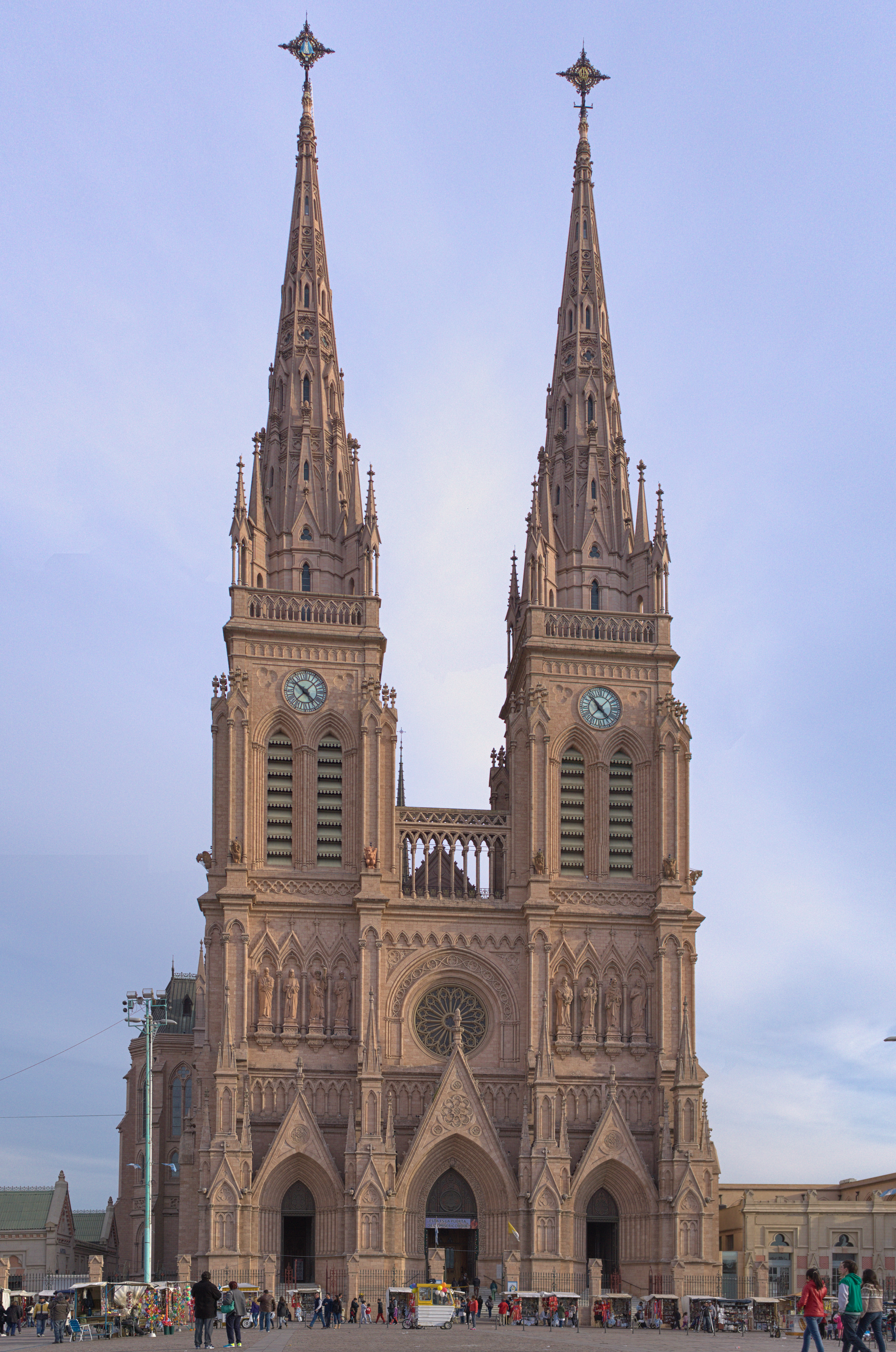
- The Basilica in 2016
- Basilica of Luján
- 34°33′52″S 59°07′17″W
- Location: Luján
- Country: Argentina
- Denomination: Roman Catholic
- Website: santuariodelujan.org.ar

Architecture
- Functional status: Active
- Style: Neogothic
- Groundbreaking: 1890
- Completed: 1935; 91 years ago

Specifications
- Length: 104 m (341 ft)
- Width: 42 m (138 ft)

Administration
- Archdiocese: Roman Catholic Archdiocese of Mercedes-Luján

National Historic Monument of Argentina
- Designated: 1998

The Minor Basilica of Our Lady of Luján (Spanish: Basílica Menor de Nuestra Señora de Luján) is a Catholic church in Luján, Buenos Aires, Argentina. It is dedicated to Our Lady of Luján, the patron saint of Argentina, and is part of the Archdiocese of Mercedes-Luján, whose seat is located at the Cathedral Basilica of Mercedes-Luján in the neighboring city of Mercedes. Built in Neogothic style between 1890 and 1935, the basilica has been visited by various high-level Argentine leaders and officials, and one Catholic Pope. The basilica is central to the Our Lady of Luján pilgrimage, a nearly 150-year old annual pilgrimage to the church, which can be attended by up to thousands of pilgrims during its peak years.

== History ==
The city of Luján has been a site of religious importance since at least the 17th century, when a shrine was built along the Luján River in what would become the town. A larger shrine was built in 1685, where pilgrims would travel in order to be baptized. The first known official pilgrimage to the city began in 1871. The enlargement of the church to its current state was commissioned by Jorge Salvaire, who, in 1874, asked for the intercession of Our Lady of Luján to prevent him from being killed by a group of natives. He was spared by the son of the chief of the tribe who had captured him and, out of gratitude to Our Lady of Luján, who he believed had saved him, began the construction of the church, which was approved by Pope Leo XIII in 1887. His project had occurred during a time of increased secularization in Argentina, which the Catholic Church sought to curtail, using the following around Our Lady of Luján to stir support. The first stone of the church was laid by the Archbishop of Buenos Aires on April 16, 1887, eight days after the approval of the Pope.

The Basilica under construction in 1897

The project sparked debate over the eventual design of the building, with one group arguing for the construction of the church in the style of Renaissance architecture, in a site away from the original worship site. The second group, led by Salvaire, argued to demolish the original building and construct a Gothic-style building on the former site. The latter group eventually won out. Construction of the church was led by Ulrico Curtois, a French architect and former student of Eugène Viollet-le-Duc, who had also led several restoration projects in his home country. The church's construction was funded in large part by funding from the Archdiocese of La Plata, which administered Luján, as well as donations from lay church members. Salvaire died in 1899, while the shrine was still under construction. The church would be completed in 1935. The building had already been consecrated 25 years earlier, in 1910. In 1930, the church was declared a basilica by Pope Pius XII.

The first pilgrimage to the church occurred on October 29, 1893, by a group of around 400 workers organized by the Federation of Catholic Workers’ Circles in support of improved working conditions within Argentina. The event became an annual one, and by 1901, the number of attendees grew to around 5,000. The pilgrimage involved taking the train to Luján from Buenos Aires, followed by a church service and a speech at the church's altar. Those who attended would often carry banners of protest. Although some in Argentina opposed the event, Pope Leo XIII wrote an encyclical letter supporting the workers who made the pilgrimage. The construction of a rail line to Luján in 1900, as well as the establishment of services to assist pilgrims to the shrine, helped popularize the pilgrimage.

Juan Perón famously visited the church several times during his campaign for presidency. To celebrate his victory in 1946, he and his wife, Eva Perón, took part in the pilgrimage to Luján. In 1982, the basilica was visited by Pope John Paul II, who became the first Pope to visit the church in person. While there, he gifted the basilica a Golden Rose, which he blessed on June 11 of the same year. The basilica was listed as a National Historic Monument by the Argentine government in 1999. Jorge Bergoglio, before his election as Pope Francis, referred to Luján and the basilica as the "cradle of faith in our homeland".

In 2000, the metal crosses on the top of the basilica collapsed due to physical wear. The crosses were not restored to their original location until 2005.

== Gallery ==
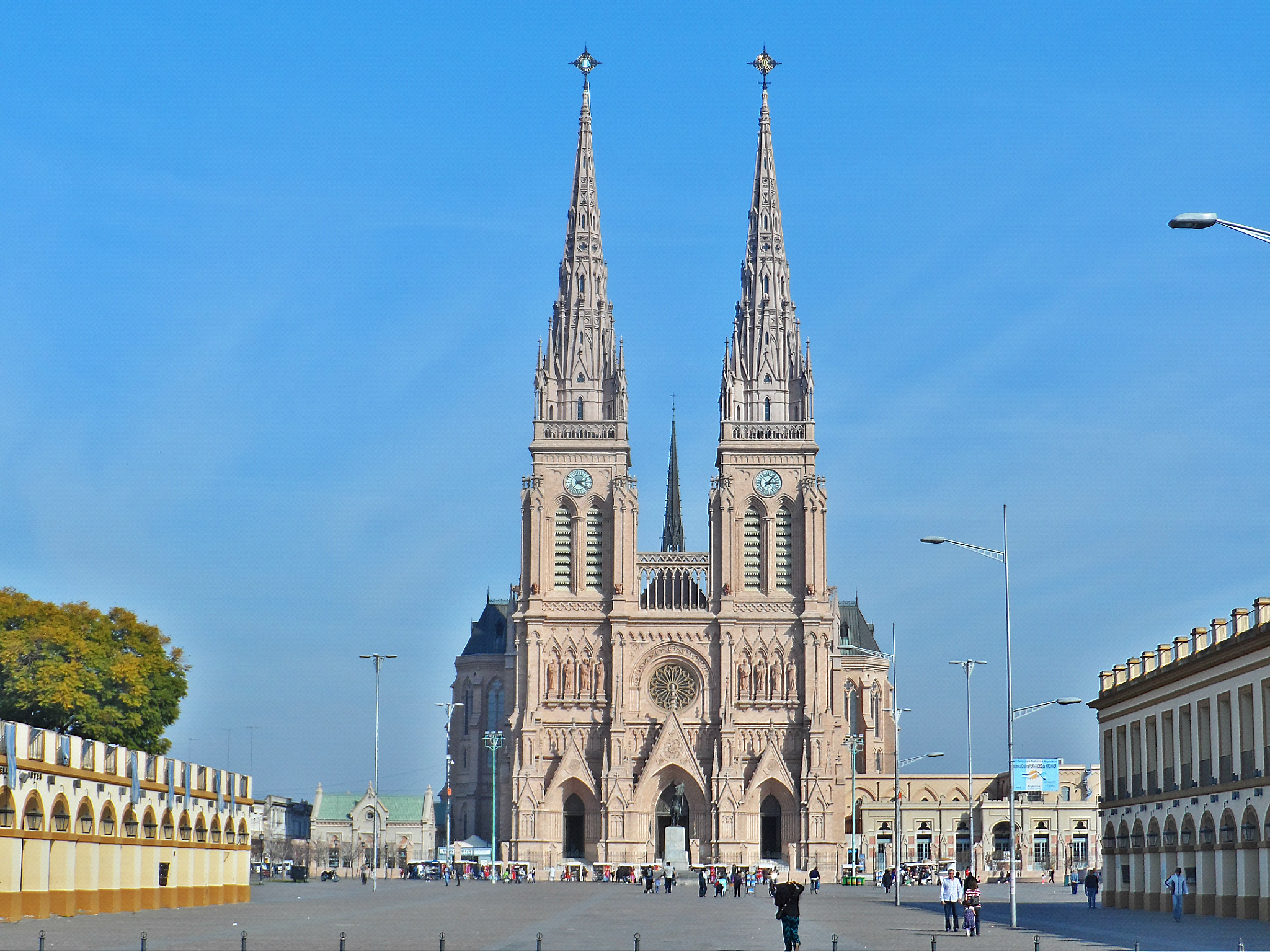
View of the Luján Basilica from Plaza Belgrano

Former cross

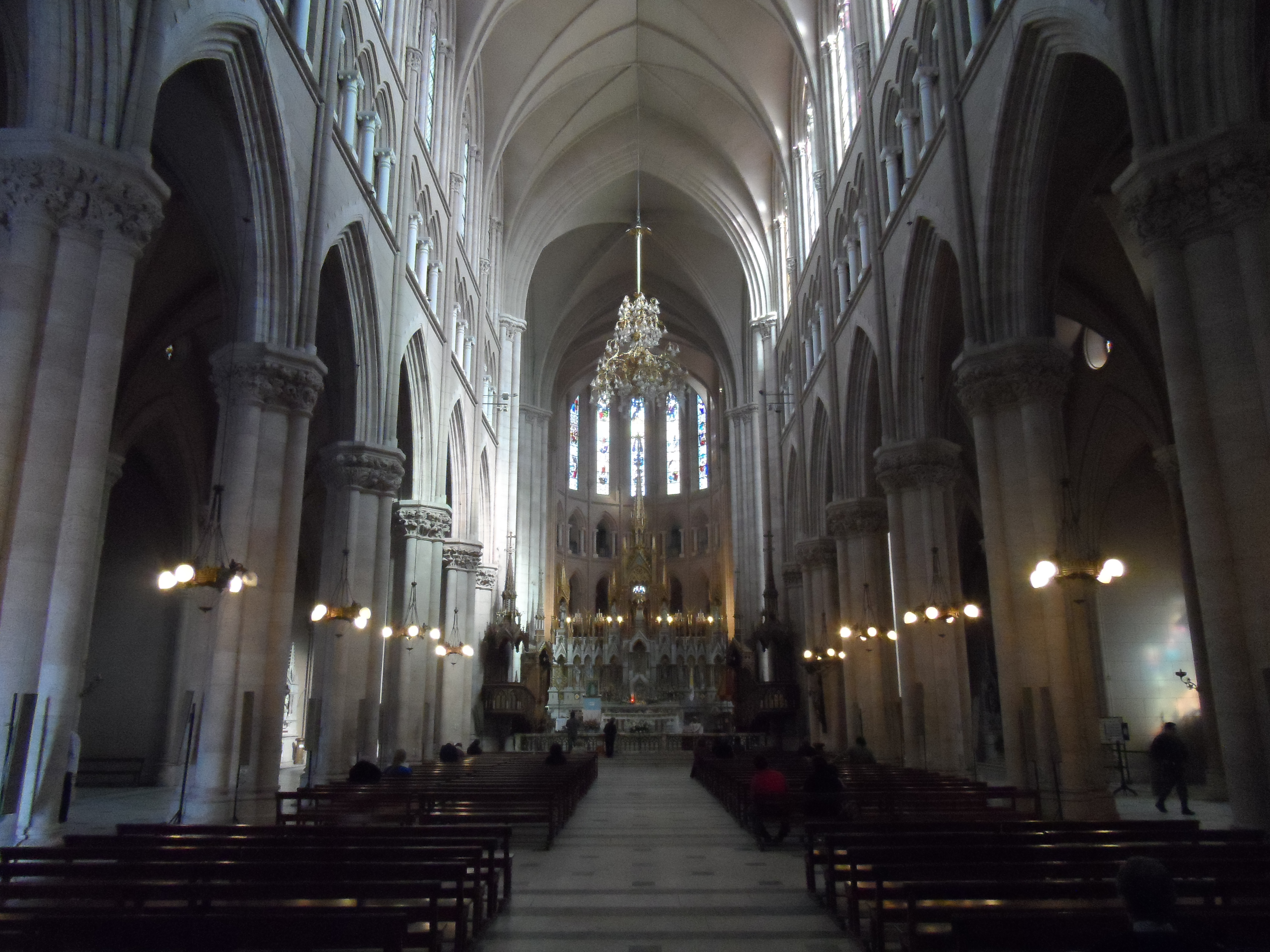
Interior of the Basilica

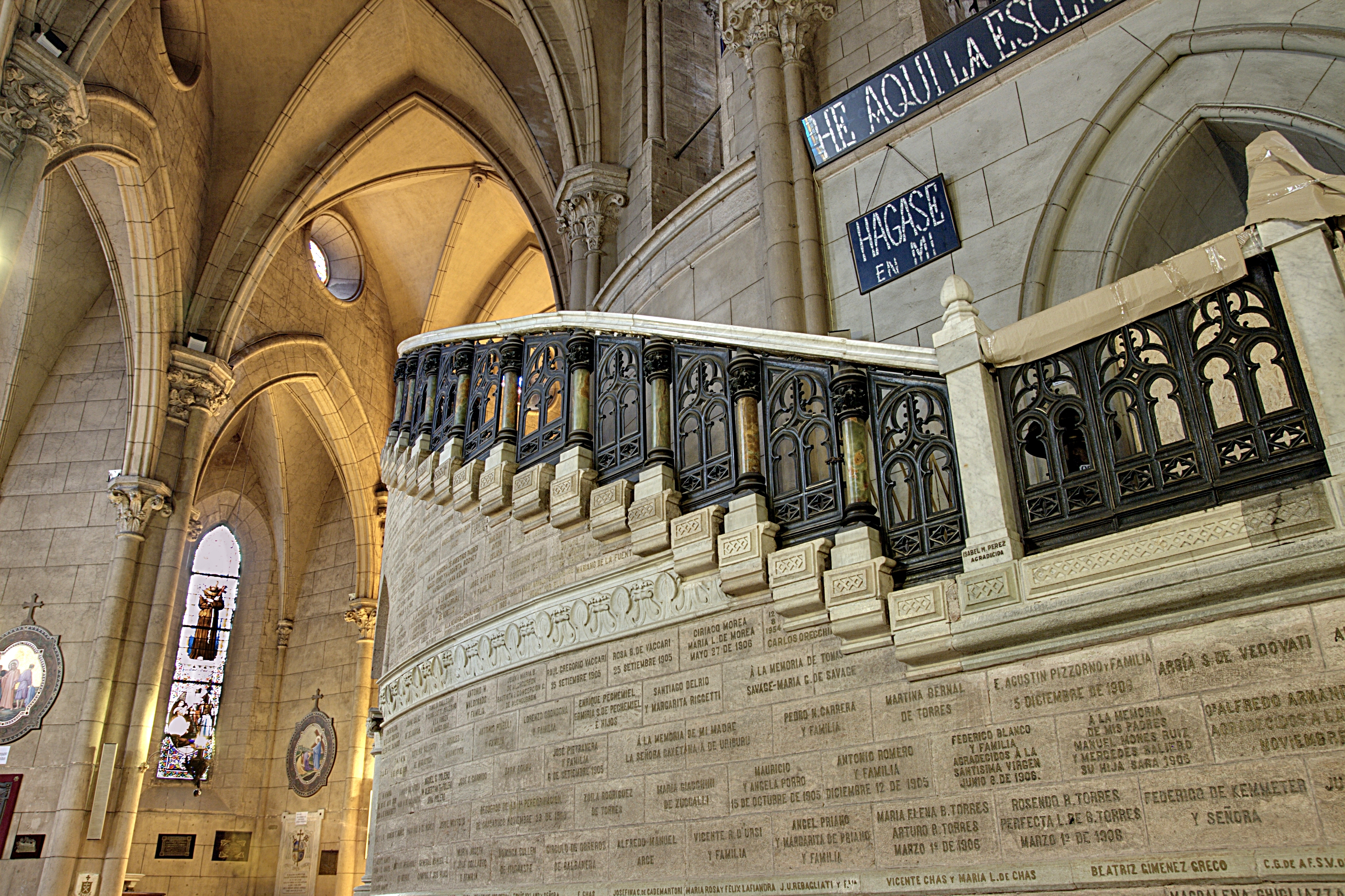
Interior of the Basilica

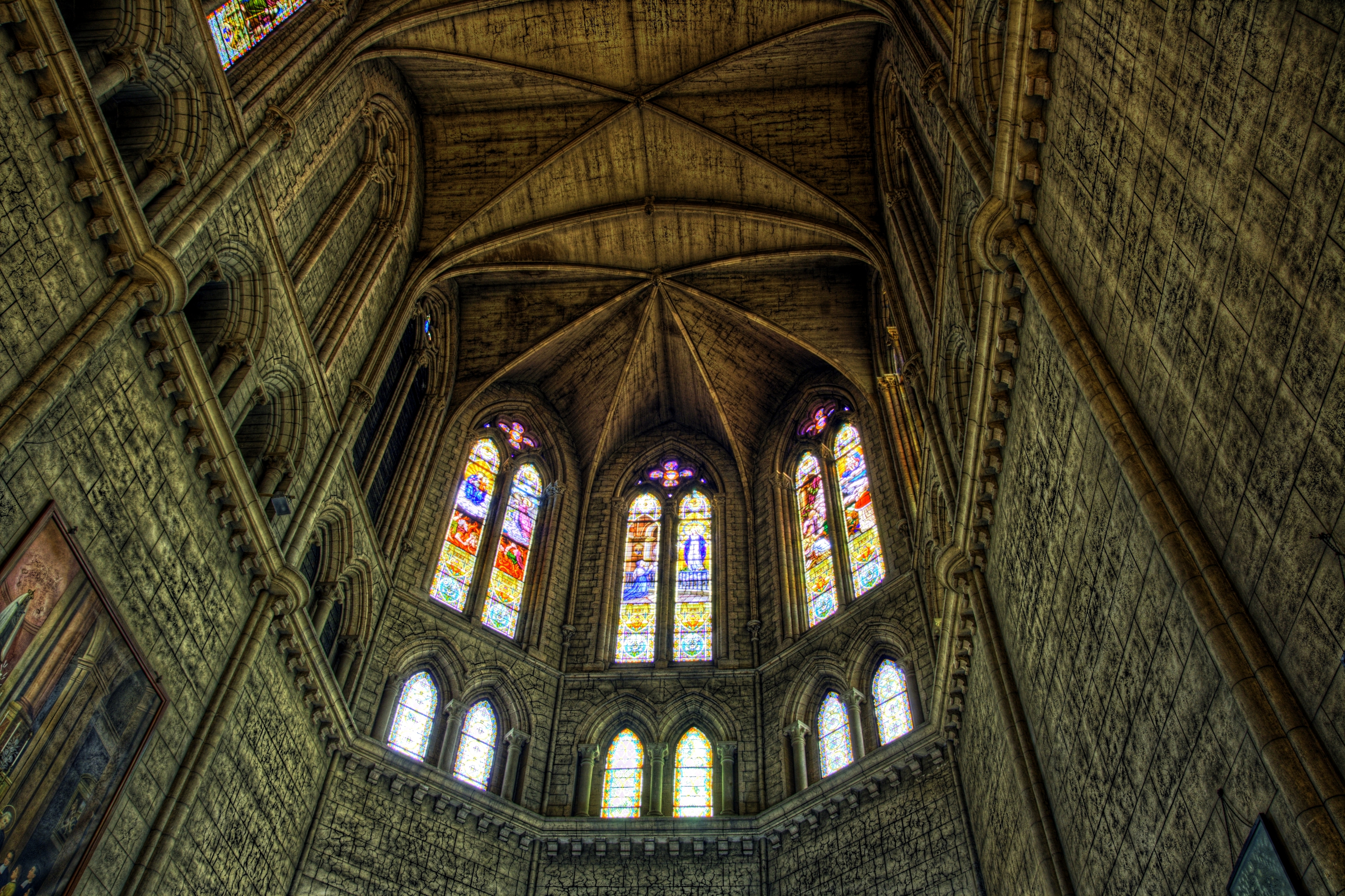
Upper part of the interior of the Basilica

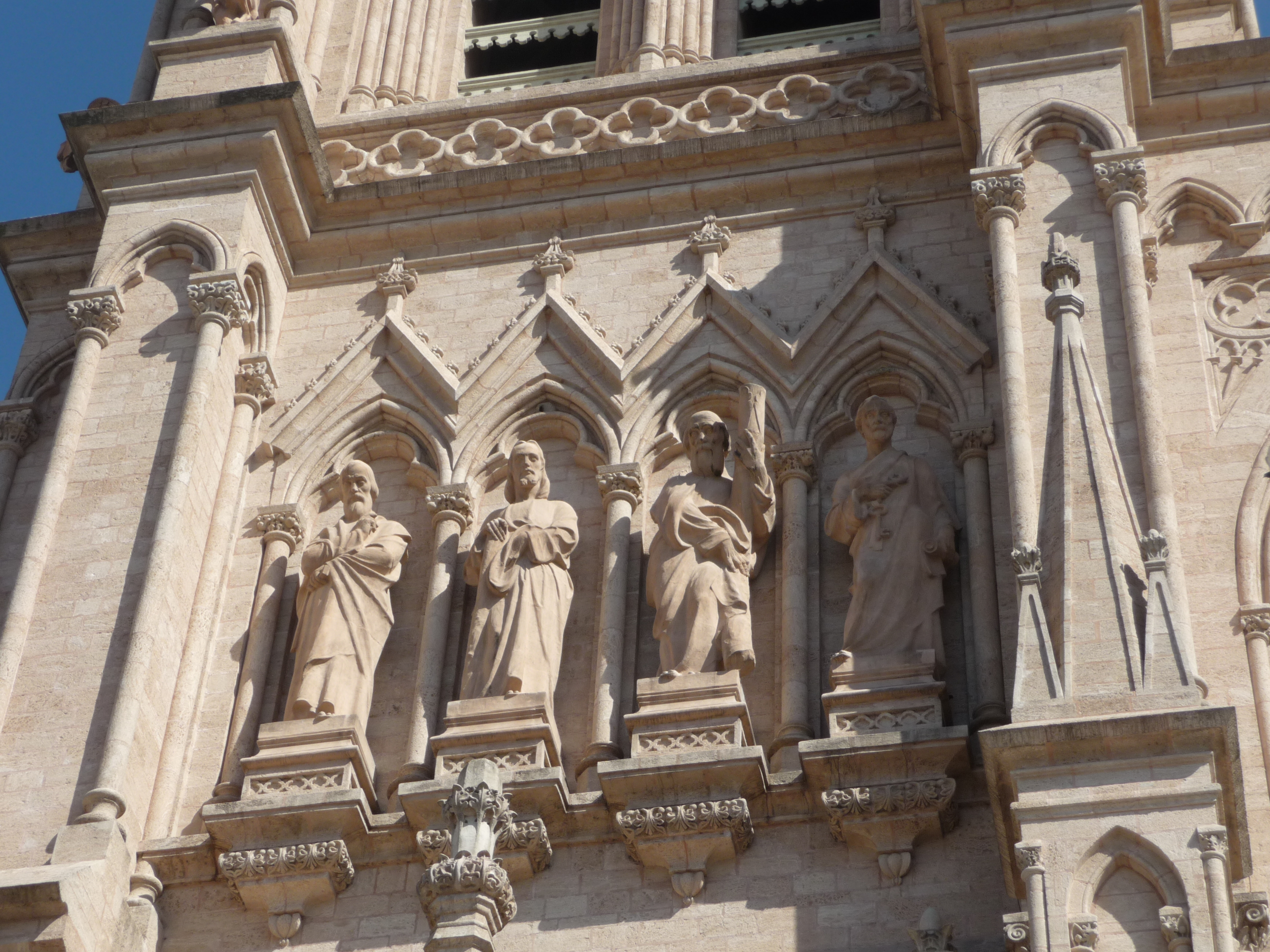
Ornamentation of the exterior

Gargoyle

Rear view

Clock tower

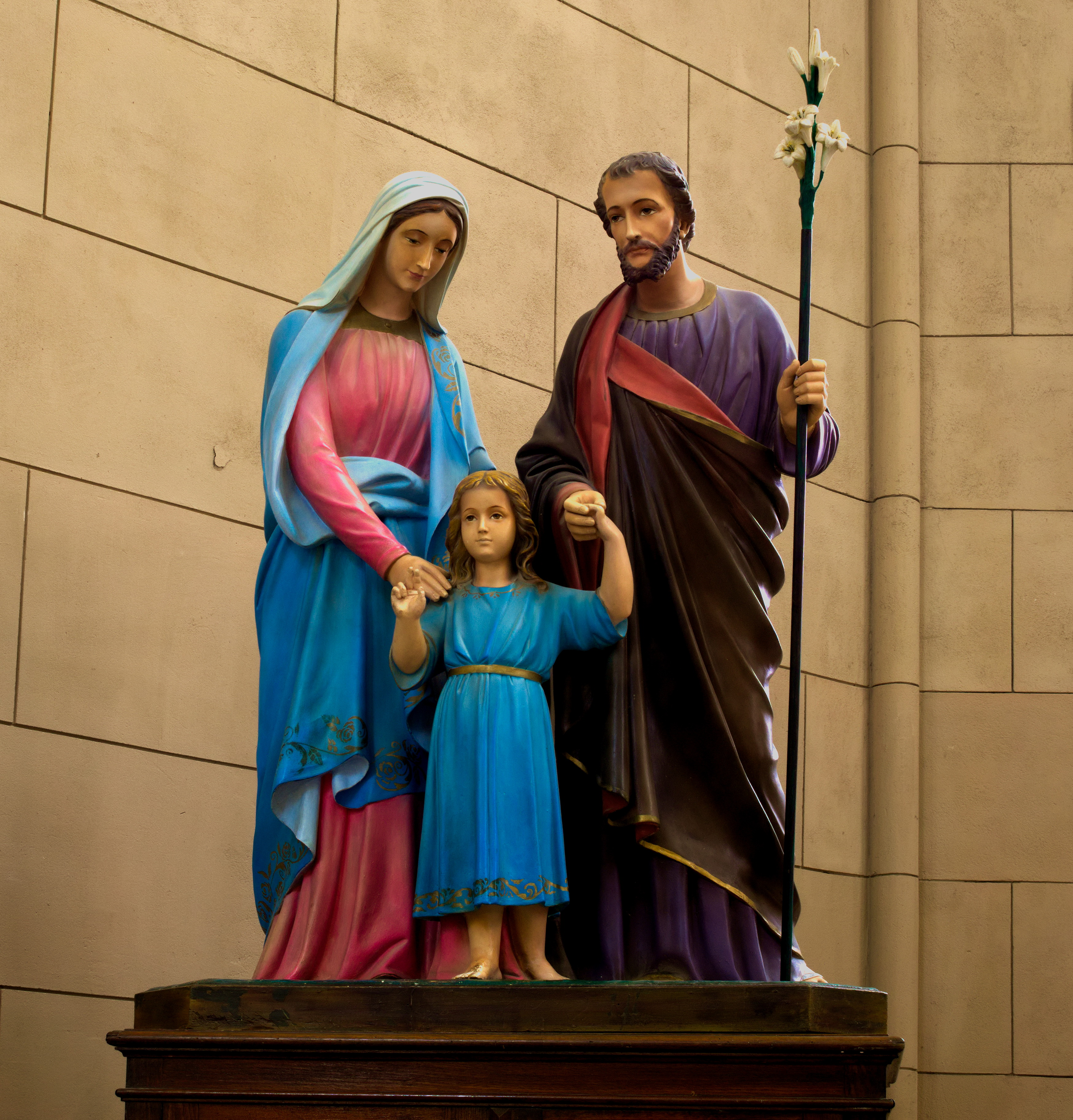
Sacred family statues

Stained glasses
