= Jorge Vázquez (bishop) =

Argentine prelate (born 1950)

- Bishop Emeritus of Diocese of Morón
- Church: Roman Catholic Church
- Appointed: 30 June 2017
- Term ended: 28 May 2025
- Predecessor: Luis Guillermo Eichhorn
- Successor: Alejandro Pablo Benna
- Previous posts: Titular Bishop of Castra Nova (2013–2017), Auxiliary Bishop of Lomas de Zamora (2013–2017), Coadjutor Bishop of Morón (2017)

Orders
- Ordination: 31 March 1983 (Priest) by Desiderio Elso Collino
- Consecration: 29 December 2013 (Bishop) by Jorge Rubén Lugones

Personal details
- Born: Jorge Vázquez; 13 March 1950 (age 76) Lomas de Zamora, Argentina
- Education: Pontifical Catholic University of Argentina

Bishop Jorge Vázquez (born 13 March 1950) is an Argentine Roman Catholic prelate, who was Bishop of Morón from 30 June 2017 to 28 May 2025. Previously he served as the Titular Bishop of Castra Nova and an Auxiliary Bishop of the Diocese of Lomas de Zamora (from 3 December 2013 until 3 February 2017) and as a Coadjutor Bishop of the Diocese of Morón (from 3 February 2017 until 30 June 2017).

== Early life and education ==
Bishop Vázquez was born into a Roman Catholic family in Lomas de Zamora, Buenos Aires Province, in 1950. He completed his secondary studies at the Minor Seminery of Nuestra Señora de Luján in La Plata. After several years of a secular work, he joined the Major Theological Seminary of the Holy Cross, of the Diocese of Lomas de Zamora.

At the Cathedral Basilica of Our Lady of Peace in Lomas de Zamora, where he served as a deacon, he was ordained a priest on 31 March 1983 for his native Diocese of Lomas de Zamora by the Diocesan Bishop Desiderio Elso Collino.

== Pastoral and administrative work ==
After his ordination, he served as a parish priest of Christ the Redeemer in Villa Jardín from 1985 to 1994; a parish priest of the Immaculate Conception in Monte Grande, from 1994 to 2003 and a parish priest Cathedral Basilica of Our Lady of Peace in Lomas de Zamora from 2003 to 2009. Also from 2009 until 2017 he served as a vicar general for this Diocese. Simultaneously from 2009 until 2010 he was a Rector of the Major Theological Seminary of the Holy Cross in Lomas de Zamora.

In this time he graduated the Instituto Presbítero Antonio Sáenz in Lomas de Zamora, and graduated with a Bachelor of Sacred Theology from the Faculty of Theology of the Pontifical Catholic University of Argentina in Buenos Aires, where he also studied Dogmatic Theology with orientation in Spirituality.

== Prelate ==
On 3 December 2013, he was appointed by Pope Francis as the Titular Bishop of Castra Nova and an Auxiliary Bishop of the Diocese of Lomas de Zamora. On 29 December 2013, he was consecrated a bishop by the Diocesan Bishop Jorge Rubén Lugones and other prelates of the Roman Catholic Church in the Santa Inés college in Turdera and on 3 February 2017 was transferred as a Coadjutor Bishop of the Diocese of Morón, until 30 June 2017, when he succeeded his predecessor.

Catholic Church titles
| Preceded by James Joseph Daly | Titular Bishop of Castra Nova; 2013–2017 | Succeeded by Vicente de Paula Ferreira |
| Preceded by Luis Guillermo Eichhorn | Diocesan Bishop of Morón; 2017–current | Succeeded by Alejandro Pablo Benna |
