= Castra Nova (Mauretania) =

Roman-era city and diocese in Mauretania, Africa Proconsulare

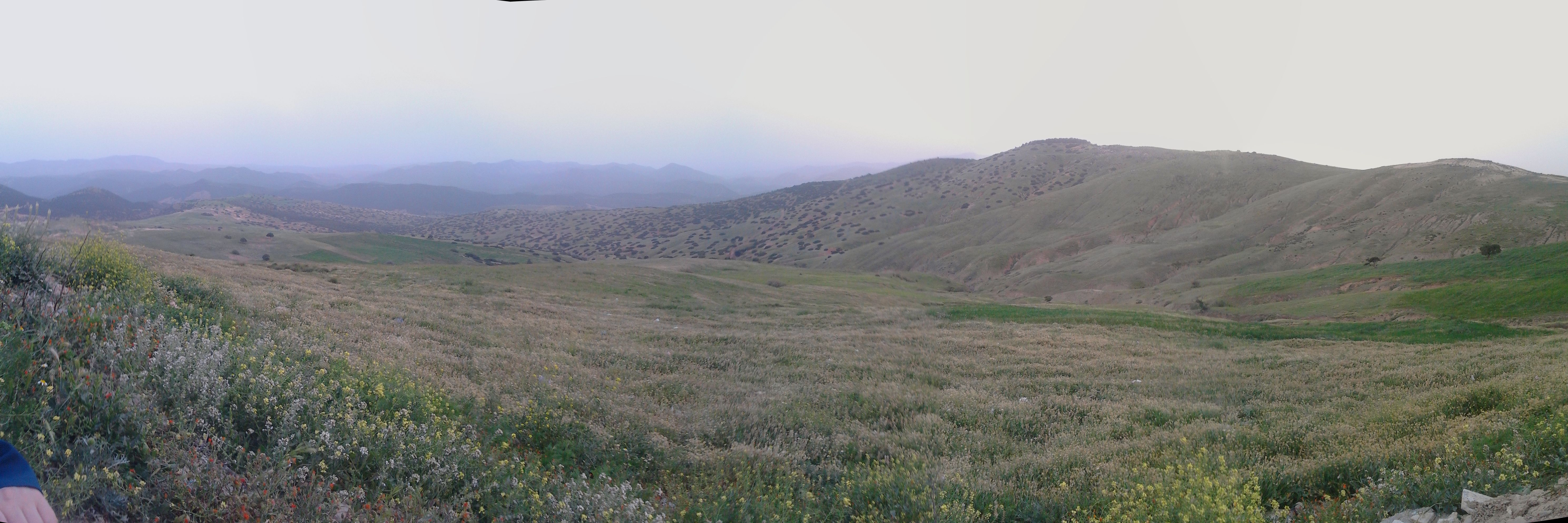
Countryside near Mohammadia/Castra Nova

Castra Nova was a Roman-era city and diocese in Mauretania, Africa Proconsulare. The town is identified with the stone ruins at Mohammadia, Mascara in modern Algeria. It is now a Roman Catholic titular see.

== History ==
Only a few Roman ruins, dating from the 1st century AD, testified to an era when Castra Nova was once flourishing. Successively the city was reduced to nothing by the invasions of the Vandals and later of the Arabs.

Map showing Castra Nova in western Mauretania Caesariensis, near Zuccabar

These ruins were the remains of the ancient city "Castra Nova". Crossroads of roads coming from Albulae (Ain Temouchent) and Portus Magnus (Saint-Leu), it occupied, at the foot of the mountains of Tell and on the right bank of the Oued el Hammam river, a strategic place.

Probably Castra Nova reached a population of 5000 inhabitants under Septimius Severus, when enjoyed the best development. The actual remains of Castra Nova show the substructures of a wall, those of some houses and a large cistern. Near these ruins there was a Roman cemetery, in which were found two Christian inscriptions.

The city of was important enough to become the seat of one of the many suffragan ancient Christian dioceses in the Roman province of Mauretania Caesariensis, in the papal sway.

The only historically documented bishop of this city was Vitalis, who took part in the Council of Carthage called in 484 by king Huneric of the Vandal Kingdom, after which he was exiled like most Catholic bishops, unlike their schismatic Donatist heretical counterparts.

The diocese expired after the city was taken by Islamic armies at the end of the 7th century.

The city was re-founded by French colonists on the ruins of the Roman city and was renamed Perregaux. Today the city is known as Mohammadia

== Titular see ==
The diocese of Castra Nova was nominally restored in 1933 as Latin titular bishopric of Castra nova (Latin) / Castra nova (Curiate Italian) / Castranovensis (Latin adjective).

It has had the following titular bishops, of the fitting Episcopal (lowest) rank 'with an archiepiscopal exception :

- Titular Archbishop: Alberto Di Jorio (Italian) (1962.04.05 – 1962.04.20), as Cardinal-Deacon of S. Pudenziana 'pro illa vice Deaconry (1958.12.18 – 1967.06.26) and Pro-President of Pontifical Commission for Vatican City State (1961.08.14 – 1968.11.04); previously Secretary General of Administrative Office of Institute for Works of Religion (1942–1944), Secretary of Sacred College of Cardinals (1947–1958); later promoted Cardinal-Priest of above S. Pudenziana (1967.06.26 – death 1979.09.05)
- Frederick Hall, Mill Hill Missionaries (M.H.M.) (born England) (1963.12.02 – resigned 1976.07.27) as emeritate; previously Titular Bishop of Alba Maritima (1948.04.09 – 1953.03.25) as last Apostolic Vicar of Kisumu (Kenya, now Metropolitan) (1948.04.09 – 1953.03.25), promoted first Bishop of Kisumu (1953.03.25 – retired 1963.12.02); died 1988
- James Joseph Daly (1977.02.28 – death 2013.10.14) as Auxiliary Bishop of Rockville Centre (USA) (1977.02.28 – retired 1996.07.01) and on emeritate
- Jorge Vázquez (2013.12.03 – 2017.02.03), as Auxiliary Bishop of Lomas de Zamora (Argentina), next Coadjutor Bishop of Morón (Argentina) (2017.02.03 – ...).
- Bishop-elect Vicente de Paula Ferreira, Redemptorists (C.SS.R.) (2017.03.08 – ...), as Auxiliary Bishop of Belo Horizonte (Brazil), no previous prelature.

== See also ==
- List of Catholic dioceses in Algeria

== Sources and external links ==
- GCatholic - (titular) bishopric
