= Julio César Grassi =

Argentine Catholic priest and convicted child molester

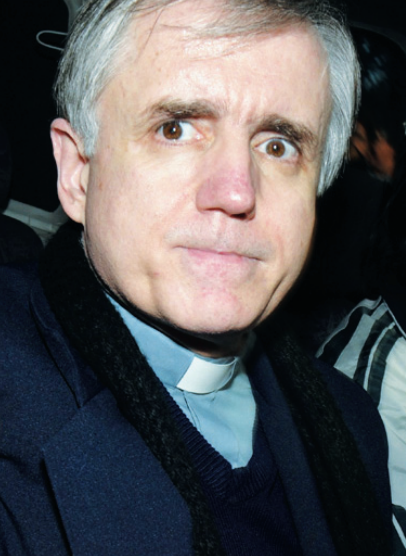
- Grassi pictured after his arrest
- Born: 14 August 1956 (age 70); Lomas de Zamora, Buenos Aires Province, Argentina
- Status: Incarcerated
- Occupation: Priest
- Known for: Abuse of children Money laundering
- Convictions: Child sexual abuse (2 counts); Money laundering
- Criminal charges: Child sexual abuse Money laundering
- Penalty: 15 years in prison (counts of sexual abuse); 2 years in prison (fraud charges)

Details
- Date apprehended: 23 October 2002 (first arrest in judicial process)

Julio César Grassi (born 14 August 1956) is an Argentine Roman Catholic priest and convicted sex offender, child molester and fraudster.

== Early life and priesthood ==
Julio César Grassi was born on 14 August 1956 in Lomas de Zamora, Buenos Aires. Grassi went on to study philosophy and religious studies and was ordained as a priest in October 1987. Grassi became a well-known priest on Argentine television, regularly appearing on different shows and promoting charitable works. He eventually won a national television award for his work at a radio station in the 1990s.

In December 1993, Grassi founded a foundation for children in need which assisted over 6,000 boys and girls in twenty-one cities across the country, providing them with food, clothing, education, homes and religious studies. Over time, the foundation received large quantities of donations and began to host children under judicial processes.

== Accusations ==
In 1991, an acquaintance of Grassi filed a report at a Court of Minors, saying that Grassi sexually abused and molested children. The case was later dismissed and archived. In 2000, a prosecutor opened another case against Grassi on the basis of anonymous letters that he had received, alleging that Grassi sexually abused and molested many children during his time at the foundation. Again, the case was archived.

In July 2001, irregularities about his management of the foundation arose, and he was evicted from his position by bishop Justo Oscar Laguna, who placed him as religious counsellor.

In October 2002, a news station conducted an extensive journalistic investigation and presented alleged proof that Grassi had maintained a sexual encounter with a 15-year-old boy against the boy's will. In response, Grassi disappeared and was declared a fugitive. After a few days, Grassi presented himself at a television station and was arrested and placed under house arrest.

In June 2006, as the first case advanced, a 17-year-old boy presented himself and said that Grassi had sexually abused him repeatedly between 1998 and 2003. Five other minors between the ages of 11 and 17 were allegedly abused by Grassi during this time, according to the two minors who had already reported him to the police.

== Trial and convictions ==
Grassi was tried in August 2008 for the first two cases of sexual abuse of minors and corruption of minors. He was convicted and sentenced to 15 years in prison. However, Grassi remained out of prison under the concept of law in Argentina where a defendant may or may not remain free until the sentence is ratified by upper courts. Between the sentence and 2013, Grassi avoided prison, when he was finally imprisoned. In March 2017, the Supreme Court of Argentina ratified the first instance conviction and sentence of 15 years in prison. He was also ordered to register as a sex offender in a national DNA data base.

In 2016, Grassi was tried for money laundering over the handling of the foundation's money and was convicted of the charges and sentenced to an additional two years in prison.

Grassi's lawyers unsuccessfully appealed the verdicts twice.

In April 2023, Grassi applied for parole after completing two-thirds of his sentence.

On the same day, lawyer Juan Pablo Gallego, who helped convict Grassi of the sexual crimes, asked the Tribunal No. 1 of Morón to refer Grassi's status of Catholic priest to Pope Francis himself, in order to laicize Grassi and remove his clergy privileges. The Tribunal referred the matter to the Roman Catholic Diocese of Morón for analysis.

On 22 August 2024, Grassi was denied parole.
