= Luis Guillermo Eichhorn =

Argentine prelate of the Catholic Church (1942–2022)

His Excellency, The Most Reverend Luis Guillermo Eichhorn
- Bishop Emeritus of Morón
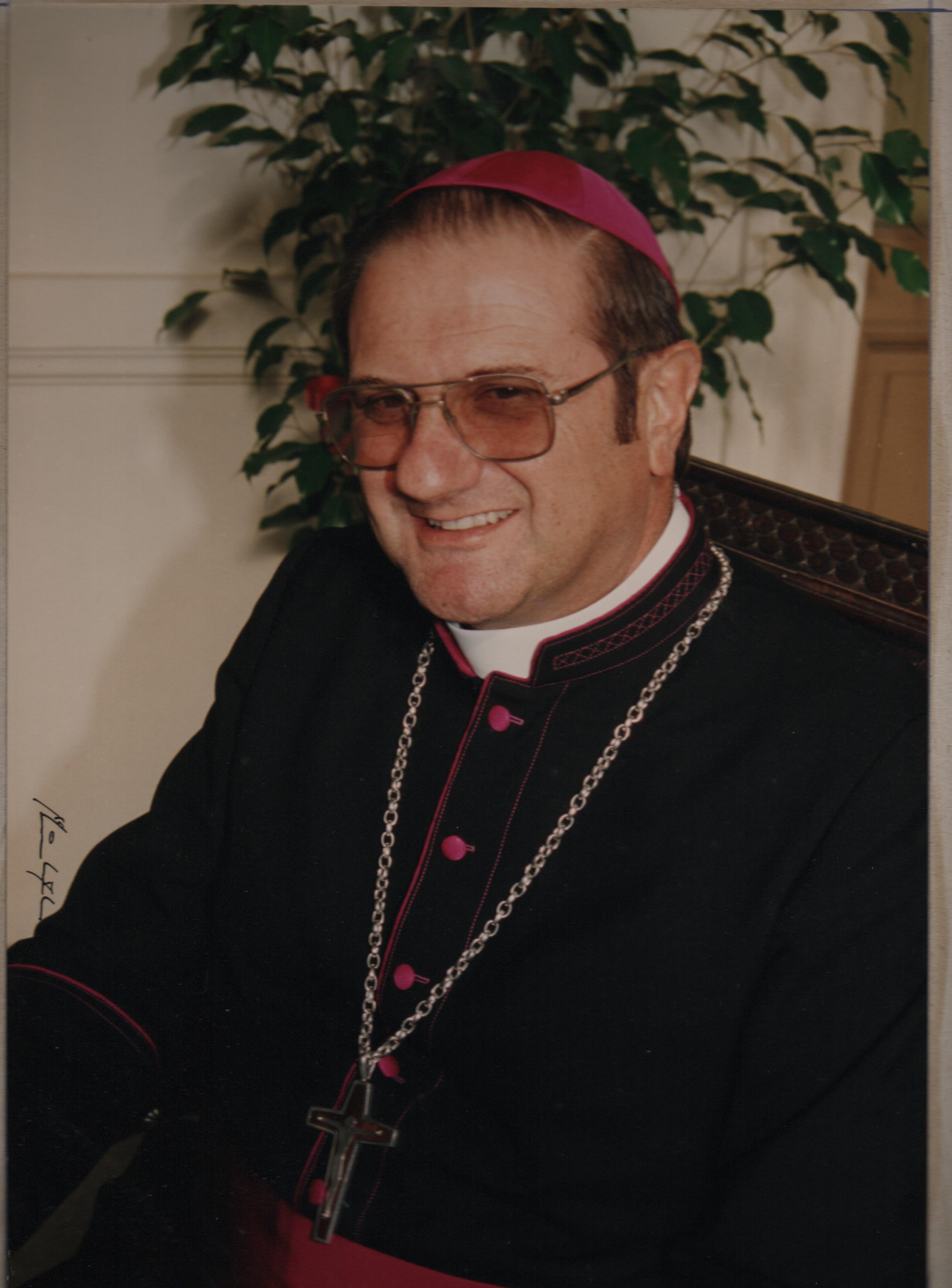
- Eichhorn in 1997
- Diocese: Morón
- Appointed: 30 June 2017
- Term ended: 25 May 2022
- Predecessor: Justo Oscar Laguna
- Successor: Jorge Vázquez
- Previous posts: Bishop of Gualeguaychú (1996–2004); Bishop of Morón (2004–2017)

Personal details
- Born: 26 June 1942 Gilbert, Entre Ríos, Argentina
- Died: 25 May 2022 (aged 79) Gualeguaychú, Argentina
- Motto: Que Seamos Todos Uno (May we all be one)
- Coat of arms: Luis Guillermo Eichhorn's coat of arms

Ordination history
History
Episcopal consecration
- Principal consecrator: Pedro Boxler
- Co-consecrators: Estanislao Esteban Karlic, Adolfo Gerstner
Episcopal succession
Bishops consecrated by Luis Guillermo Eichhorn as principal consecrator
- Ricardo Oscar Faifer: 2002

Styles of Luis Guillermo Eichhorn
- Reference style: His Excellency; The Most Reverend
- Spoken style: Your Excellency
- Religious style: Bishop

Luis Guillermo Eichhorn (26 June 1942 – 25 May 2022) was an Argentine prelate of the Catholic Church.

Eichhorn was born in Gilbert, Entre Ríos, Argentina, son of Doña Emilia D' Angelo and Don Enrique Eichhorn. He was ordained to the priesthood in 1968 at the Basilica of the Immaculate Conception of Uruguay. He served as bishop of the Diocese of Gualeguaychú, Argentina, from 1996 to 2004 and as bishop of the Diocese of Morón, Argentina from 2004 until his retirement in 2017. Upon his retirement he was appointed Bishop Emeritus of Gualeguaychú.

Eichhorn died on 25 May 2022, at the age of 79.

Catholic Church titles
| Preceded by Justo Oscar Laguna | Bishop of Morón; 2004–2017 | Succeeded by Jorge Vázquez |
| Preceded by Pedro Boxler | Bishop of Gualeguaychú; 1996–2004 | Succeeded by Jorge Eduardo Lozano |
