= Diocese of Lomas de Zamora =

Catholic ecclesiastical territory

Diocese of Lomas de Zamora Dioecesis Clivi Zamorensis Diócesis de Lomas de Zamora

Catholic
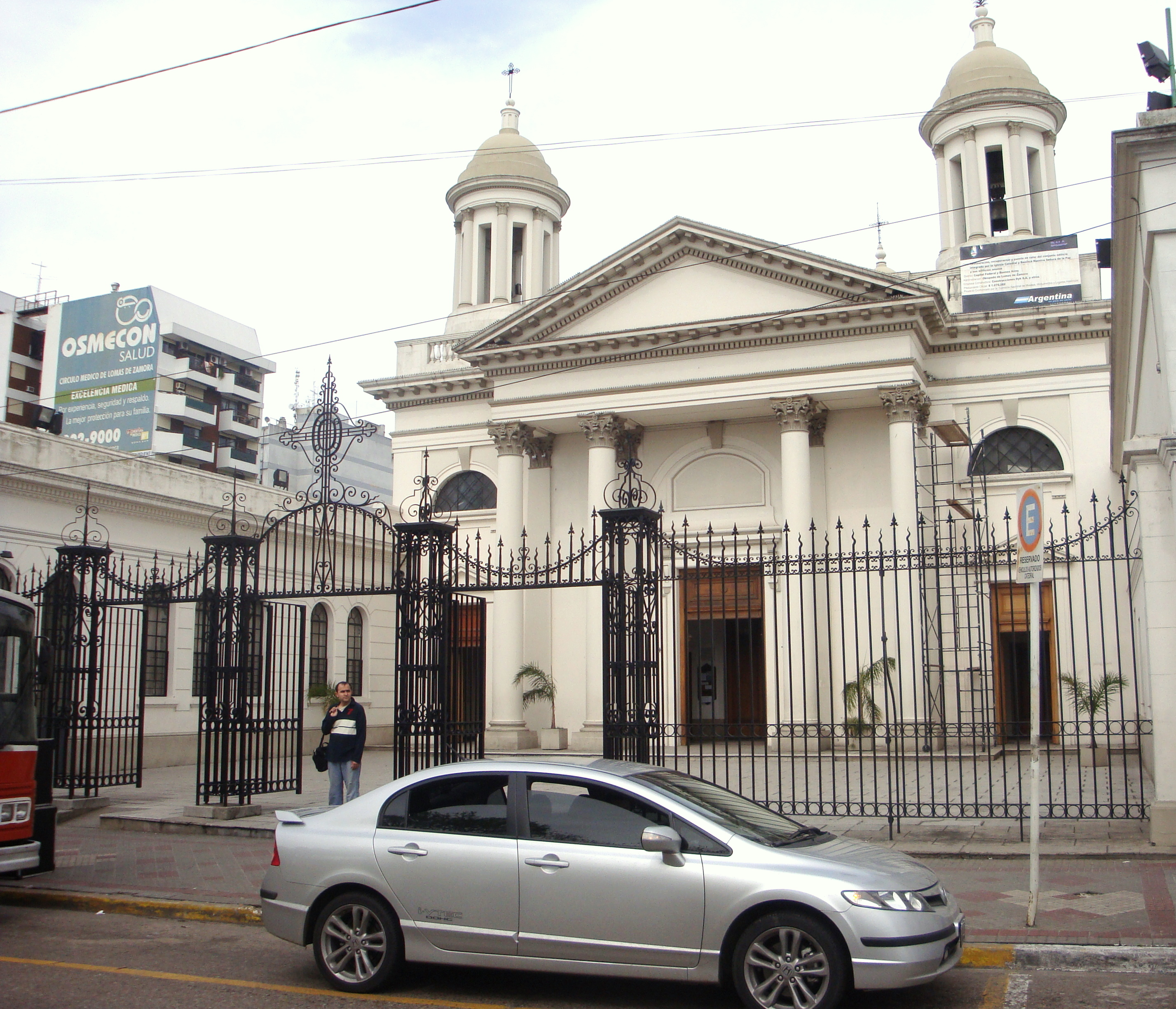
- Catedral Basílica de Nuestra Señora de La Paz

Location
- Country: Argentina
- Ecclesiastical province: Buenos Aires
- Metropolitan: Buenos Aires

Statistics
- Area: 1,400 km^{2} (540 sq mi)
- Population: Total; Catholics: (as of 2004); 2,061,548; 1,771,037 (85.9%)
- Parishes: 53

Information
- Denomination: Roman Catholic
- Rite: Roman Rite
- Established: 11 February 1957 (69 years ago)
- Cathedral: Cathedral Basilica of Our Lady of Peace in Lomas de Zamora
- Patron saint: Our Lady of Peace

Current leadership
- Pope: Leo XIV
- Bishop: Jorge Ruben Lugones, S.J.
- Metropolitan Archbishop: Jorge Ignacio García Cuerva
- Auxiliary Bishops: Ignacio Damián Medina

Map
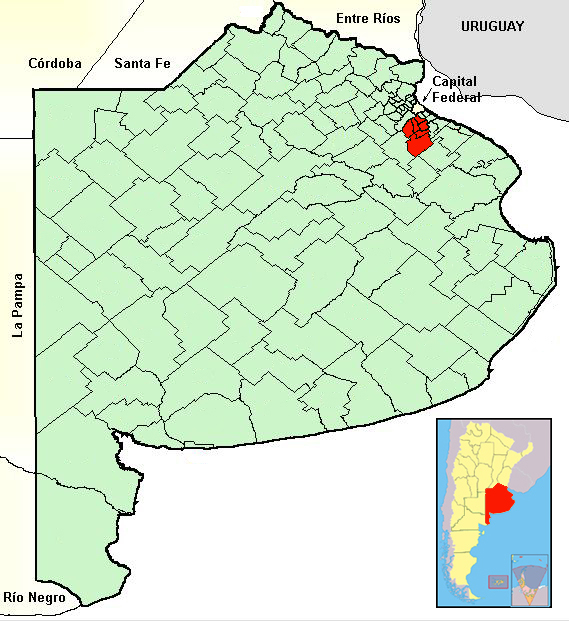

The Roman Catholic Diocese of Lomas de Zamora (erected 11 February 1957) is in Argentina and is a suffragan of the Archdiocese of Buenos Aires.

== Bishops ==
=== Ordinaries ===
- Filemón Castellano (1957–1963)
- Alejandro Schell (1963–1972)
- Desiderio Elso Collino (1972–2001)
- Agustín Roberto Radrizzani, S.D.B. (2001–2007 ), appointed Archbishop of Mercedes-Luján
- Jorge Ruben Lugones, S.J. (2008– )

=== Coadjutor bishop ===
- Alejandro Schell (1958–1963)

=== Auxiliary bishops ===
- Héctor Gabino Romero (1978–1984), appointed Bishop of Rafaela
- José María Arancedo (1988–1991), appointed Bishop of Mar del Plata
- Juan Carlos Maccarone (1993–1996), appointed Bishop of Chascomús
- Jorge Vázquez (2013–2017), appointed Coadjutor Bishop of Morón
- Carlos Alberto Novoa de Agustini, O.F.M. Cap. (2013); did not take effect
- Jorge Martín Torres Carbonell (2014–2020), appointed Bishop of Gregorio de Laferrere
- Jorge Ignacio García Cuerva (2017–2019), appointed Bishop of Río Gallegos
- Ignacio Damián Medina (2019-)

=== Other priests of this diocese who became bishops ===
- Gustavo Arturo Help, appointed Bishop of Venado Tuerto in 2000
- Luis Alberto Fernández Alara, appointed Auxiliary Bishop of Buenos Aires in 2009

== Territorial losses ==
Year	Along with	To form
1961	Archdiocese of La Plata	Diocese of Avellaneda
1969	Diocese of Morón	Diocese of San Justo
2001	Diocese of Avellaneda	Diocese of Avellaneda-Lanús
