= Julián Maidana =

Argentine footballer

Personal information
- Full name: Julián Edgardo Maidana
- Date of birth: January 11, 1972 (age 54)
- Place of birth: Lomas de Zamora, Argentina
- Height: 1.88 m (6 ft 2 in)
- Position: Central defender

Senior career*
| Years | Team | Apps | (Gls) |
| 1990–1995 | All Boys | | |
| 1995–1996 | Gimnasia y Tiro | 37 | (5) |
| 1996–1998 | Instituto de Córdoba | - | |
| 1998–2002 | Talleres | 117 | (11) |
| 2002 | Racing Club | 11 | (0) |
| 2002–2003 | Livingston | 12 | (0) |
| 2003–2004 | Talleres | 34 | (3) |
| 2004–2006 | Newell's Old Boys | 38 | (6) |
| 2006 | Grêmio | 11 | (2) |
| 2007 | Banfield | 4 | (0) |
| 2007–2008 | Talleres | - | |
| 2008 | O'Higgins | - | |
| 2009 | Central Córdoba | - | |
| 2010 | Ascasubi | - | |
| 2011 | General Paz Juniors | - | |
- * Club domestic league appearances and goals

Julián Edgardo Maidana (born January 11, 1972, in Lomas de Zamora) is a retired Argentine footballer. He's last club career was General Paz Juniors in the Argentine fourth division.

== Career ==
Maidana started his career at Club Atlético All Boys in the Argentinian Primera B. He obtained the championship and subsequent promotion to Nacional B in 1993, and after playing one season in that division was transferred to Gimnasia y Tiro de Salta in 1995 where he made his top league debut, and scored five goals in 35 appearances. In 1996, he moved to Instituto de Córdoba, before moving to Tallares where he made 117 appearances scoring 11 goals. In 2002, he moved to Racing Club in the Primera División making 11 appearances. He then moved to Scotland to play for Livingston in the Scottish Premier League before leaving in what were described as "acrimonious circumstances", and returning in 2003 to Argentina for a second spell with Talleres. In 2004, he again played in the Primera División, this time with Newell's Old Boys where he stayed until 2006. He them moved to Brazil to play for Grêmio. In 2007, he moved back to Argentina with Banfield, before moving back to Talleres for a third spell at the club.
