= National University of Lomas de Zamora =

Public university in Lomas de Zamora, Argentina

Coordinates: 34°46′39″S 58°27′29″W

- Universidad Nacional de Lomas de Zamora
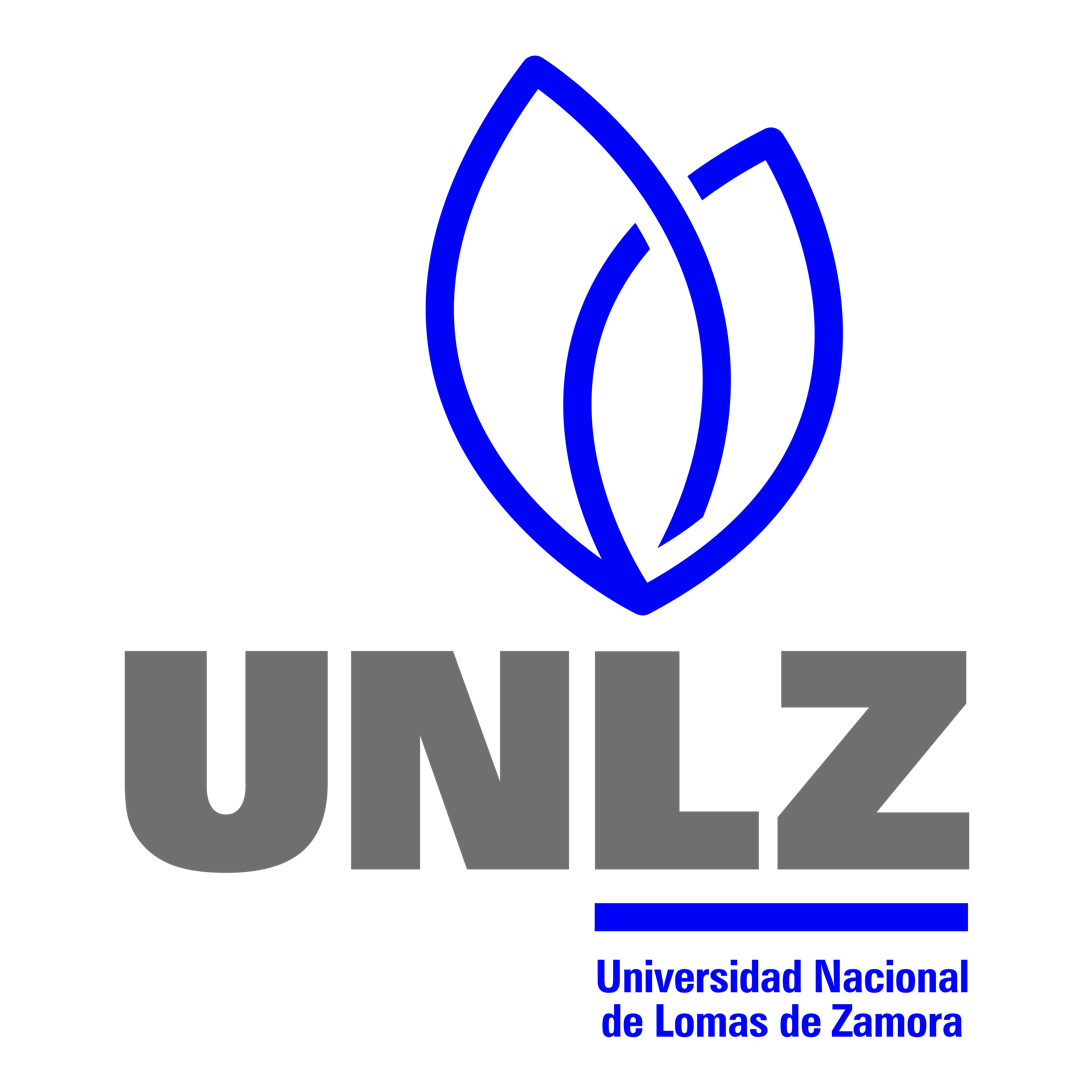
- Type: Public
- Established: 1972
- Academic staff: 3,091
- Students: 32,448
- Location: Lomas de Zamora, Buenos Aires, Argentina
- Website: www.unlz.edu.ar

The National University of Lomas de Zamora (Spanish: Universidad Nacional de Lomas de Zamora, UNLZ) is an Argentine state national university located in Lomas de Zamora, Buenos Aires Province. Maintaining extensive research facilities, and with over 30,000 students, UNLZ is one of the most important universities of the Greater Buenos Aires area.

The university includes five departments: Agronomy, Economics, Engineering, Law, and Social Sciences. The Media Department, part of the School of Social Sciences, publishes InfoRegión, an online periodical covering the Greater Buenos Aires area.

== History ==
The National University of Lomas de Zamora was established by Decree-Law 19.888 on 13 October 1972. It was the first university in the Buenos Aires metropolitan area outside Buenos Aires City proper, created as part of a national plan to establish new public universities. This initiative responded to a significant increase in student enrollment at existing institutions, driven by a growing number of secondary school graduates and internal migration. The university's location in Lomas de Zamora resulted from local community advocacy, which successfully campaigned for the city over the initially proposed site of Quilmes.

The university commenced its academic activities on 20 August 1973, with an initial enrollment of over 3,000 students. Classes were initially held in borrowed facilities, such as the Antonio Mentruyt Normal School and national schools in Adrogué and Banfield. By 1974, enrollment had grown to 4,500 students, leading to the allocation of a permanent campus site at the Cruce de Lomas.

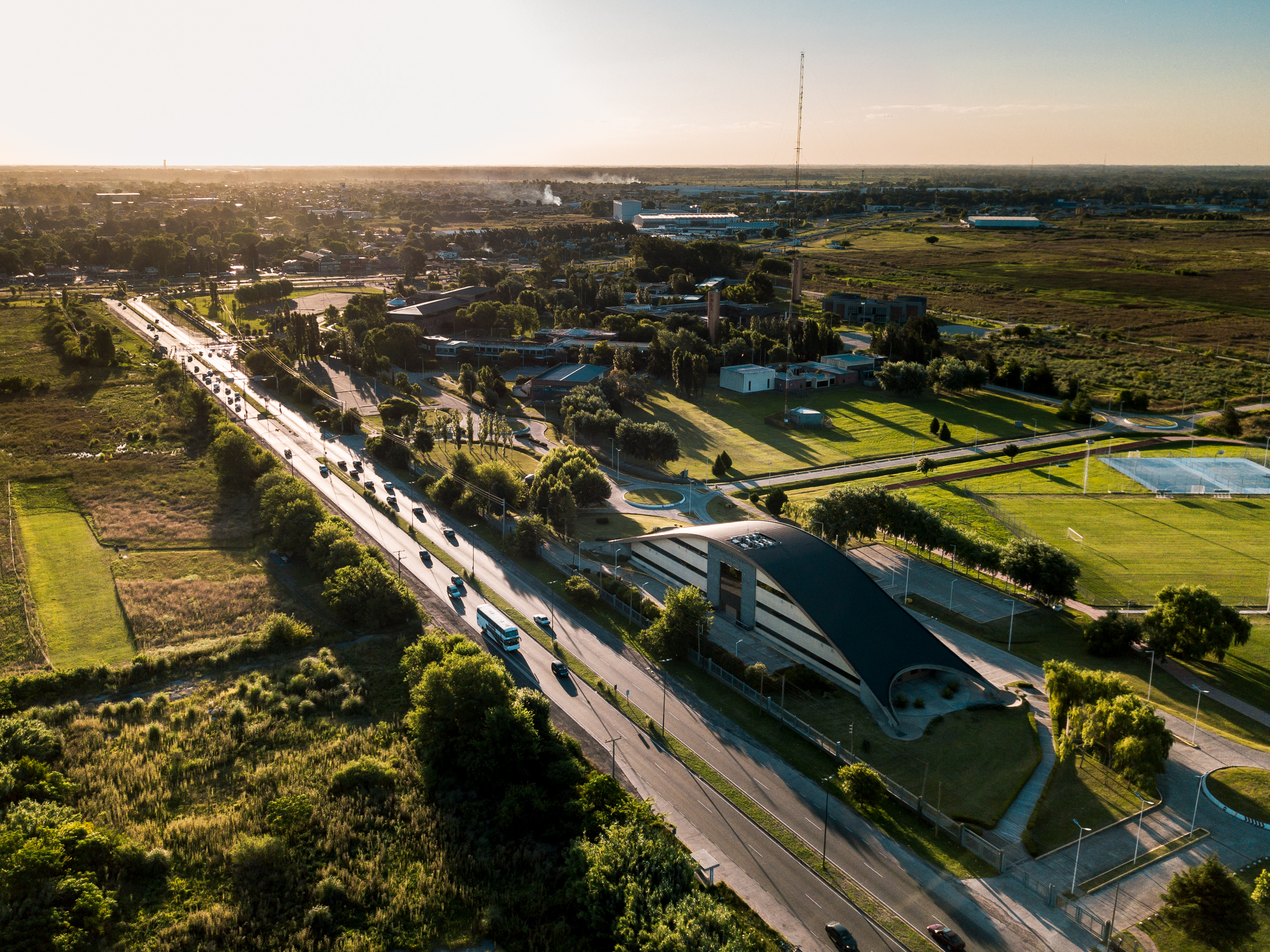
UNLZ main campus

Following the 1976 military coup, the university was subjected to government intervention under Law 21.276. The period of state terrorism resulted in the disappearance of nine UNLZ students and one former official, and the killing of another individual at the university's gates in 1974. With the return to democracy in 1983, the university began a normalization process. Enrollment at that time was approximately 13,000 students. The development of the permanent campus accelerated, with the Faculties of Economics, Law, Engineering, and Social Sciences being established and constructed on the site throughout the 1980s. In the 1990s, the university adapted its statutes to comply with the new Higher Education Law.

The institutional strengthening continued with the 1995 election of the first graduate of the university to the position of rector. In the following years, the campus was further consolidated with the construction of the central administration building and the Faculty of Agricultural Sciences, fulfilling the long-term objective of a unified university campus.

== Campus ==
The main campus of the UNLZ is located on the intersection of Camino de Cintura and Avenida Juan XXIII, in Lomas de Zamora, Buenos Aires Province.

== Notable alumni ==
- Daniel Pinto, President and COO of JPMorgan Chase
