= Alejandro Schell =

Moldovan clergyman and bishop

Alejandro Schell (9 October 1897 – 1972) was a Bessarabia German clergyman and bishop for the Roman Catholic Diocese of Lomas de Zamora. He became ordained in 1922. He was appointed bishop in 1958.
