= Alicia Genovese =

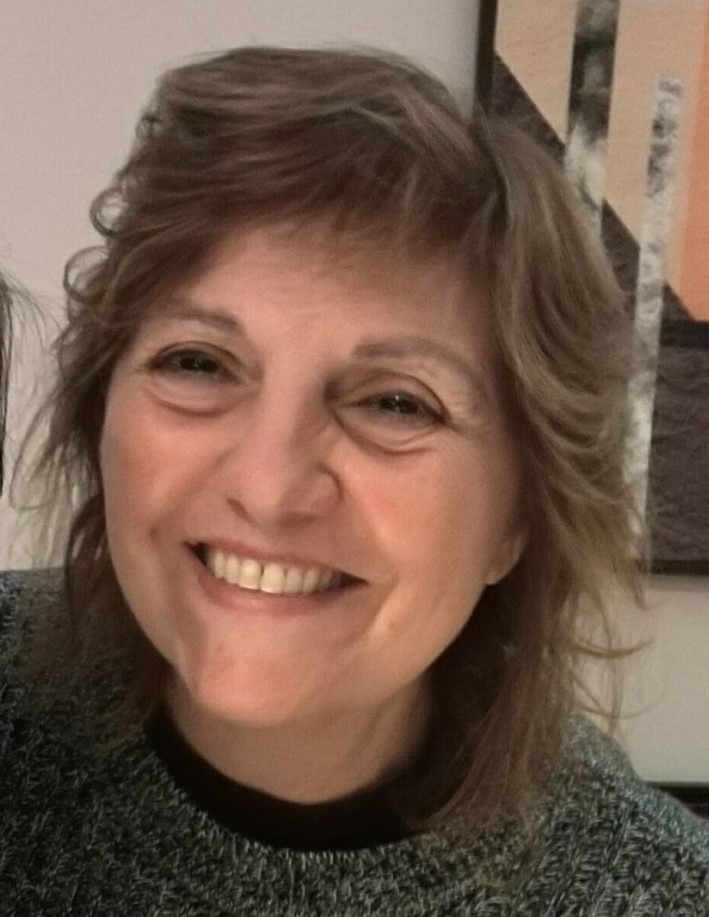

Alicia Genovese is an Argentine poet. She was born in Lomas de Zamora, Buenos Aires. She earned a PhD in Literature from the University of Florida, and now teaches at the National University of the Arts.

Since her debut collection in 1977, she has published more than a dozen books of poetry and essays. Among other distinctions, in 2002 she received the Guggenheim Scholarship and in 2015 she won the Sor Juana Inés de la Cruz international poetry prize, awarded by the State of Mexico for her unpublished book La contingencia.
