= James Joseph Daly =

American prelate

The Most Reverend James J. Daly
- Titular bishop of Castra Nova
- Church: Roman Catholic Church
- See: Titular see of Castra Nova
- In office: 1977−2013
- Predecessor: Frederick Hall, M.H.M.
- Previous post: Auxiliary Bishop of the Diocese of Rockville Centre (1977–1996)

Orders
- Ordination: May 22, 1948
- Consecration: May 9, 1977 by John R. McGann

Personal details
- Born: August 14, 1921 Bronx, New York, United States
- Died: October 14, 2013 (aged 92) Blue Point, New York, United States

James Joseph Daly (August 14, 1921 − October 14, 2013) was an American prelate of the Roman Catholic Church who served as Auxiliary bishop of the Diocese of Rockville Centre, New York from 1977 to 1996.

== Biography ==
=== Early life and education ===
Daly was born in the New York City Borough of the Bronx. Growing up on Long Island, when he felt called to become a priest he entered the Seminary of the Immaculate Conception in Huntington, New York, to serve the Diocese of Brooklyn, which at that time covered the entire island.

=== Ordination and ministry ===
Daly was ordained a priest on May 22, 1948. Ten years later he was named the dean of the seminary where he had studied, followed by an appointment in 1968 as the director of the diocese's Office of Priests Personnel, in charge of helping to decide in which parishes priests would serve.

=== Auxiliary Bishop of Rockville Centre ===
On February 28, 1977, the Holy See named him an auxiliary bishop of the Diocese of Rockville Centre of which he was a member after its creation, along with Gerald Ryan, as well as the Titular Bishop of Castra Nova. He and Ryan were consecrated bishops on May 9, 1977 by the Bishop of Rockville Centre, John R. McGann. He then became a significant assistant to McGann.

=== Retirement ===
Daly retired from his position in the diocese on July 1, 1996 and retired to Blue Point, New York, where he died. His remains were buried at the cemetery of St. Boniface Parish in Elmont, New York, where he had resided from 1972 until his retirement.

Catholic Church titles
Preceded by –	Auxiliary Bishop of Rockville Centre; 1977–1996	Succeeded by –
