= Gilbert, Entre Ríos =

Coordinates: 32°32′S 58°56′W

Gilbert (Argentina)
- Municipality and village
- Interactive map of Gilbert (Argentina)
- Country: Argentina
- Province: Entre Ríos Province
- Time zone: UTC−3 (ART)

Gilbert (Argentina) is a village and municipality in Entre Ríos Province in north-eastern Argentina.
