= Justo Oscar Laguna =

Argentine Roman Catholic bishop

- Bishop of Morón
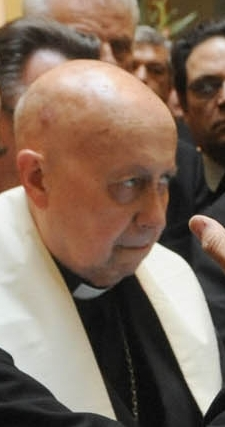
- Justo Oscar Laguna in 2010
- Church: Catholic Church
- Diocese: Diocese of Morón
- In office: 22 January 1980 – 30 November 2004
- Predecessor: Miguel Raspanti
- Successor: Luis Guillermo Eichhorn
- Previous posts: Titular Bishop of Lares (1975-1980); Auxiliary Bishop of San Isidro (1975-1980)

Orders
- Ordination: 18 September 1954
- Consecration: 8 March 1975 by Antonio María Aguirre

Personal details
- Born: 25 September 1929 Buenos Aires, Argentina
- Died: 3 November 2011 (aged 82)

Justo Oscar Laguna (25 September 1929 – 3 November 2011) was the Roman Catholic bishop of the Roman Catholic Diocese of Morón, Argentina.

Ordained to the priesthood in 1954, Laguna became a bishop in 1975 and retired in 2004.
