= Lomas de Zamora =

- City
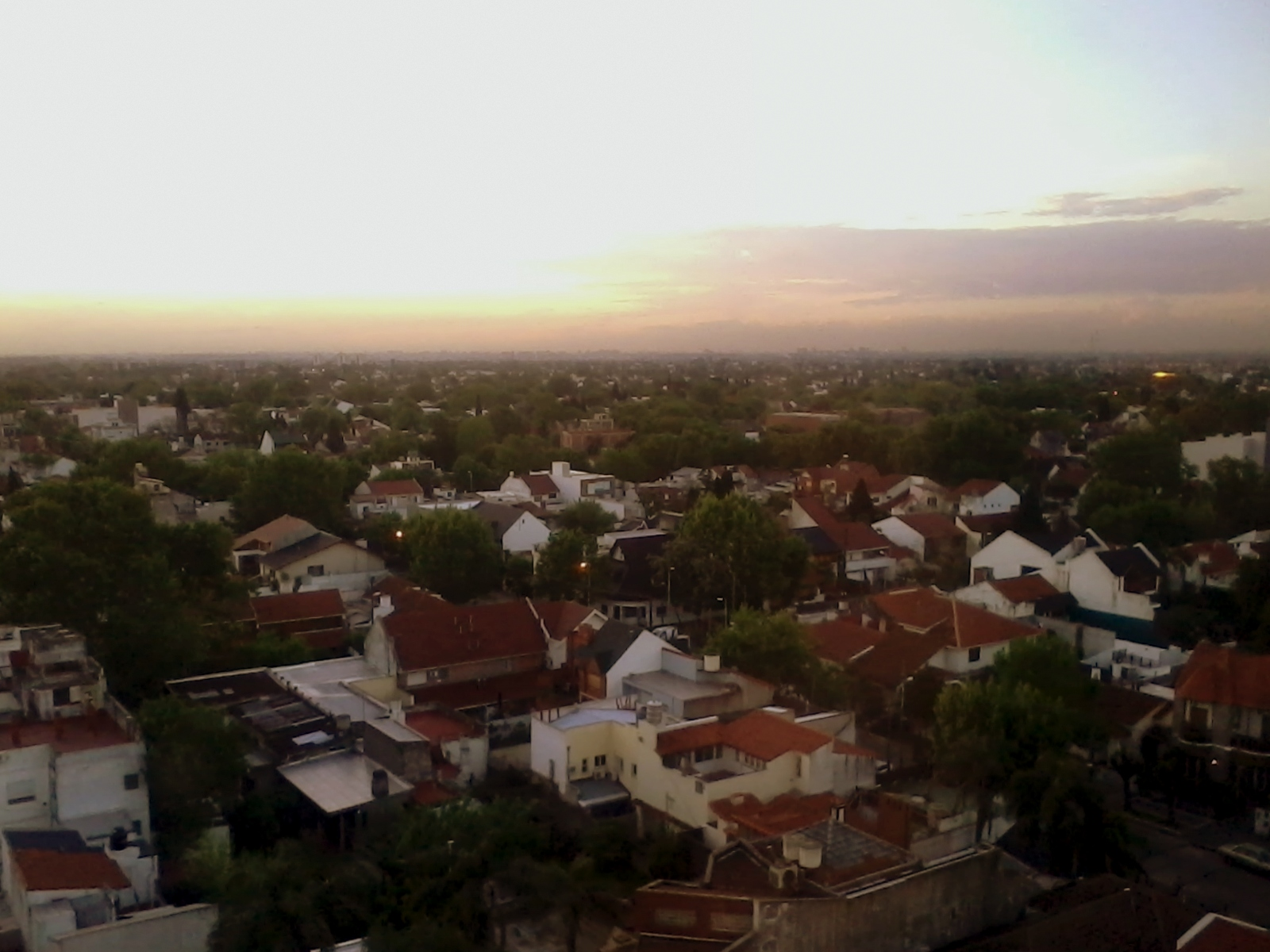
- View of the city

- Location in Greater Buenos Aires
- Coordinates: 34°46′S 58°24′W
- Country: Argentina
- Province: Buenos Aires
- Partido: Lomas de Zamora
- Founded: 1864

Government
  - Intendant: Federico Otermín (PJ)
- Elevation: 20 m (66 ft)

Population (2001 census [INDEC])
  - Total: 111,897
  - Density: 5,589/km^{2} (14,480/sq mi)
- CPA Base: B 1832
- Area code: +54 11

Lomas de Zamora is a city in the province of Buenos Aires, Argentina, located south of the City of Buenos Aires and within the metropolitan area of Greater Buenos Aires. It is the capital of Lomas de Zamora Partido and has a population of 111,897.

== Overview ==
The city of Lomas de Zamora owes its name to Juan de Zamora, a Creole of Sevillian roots, owner of the lands in 1736. Towards the end of 1860 a large number of people of British origin settled in the area. These English, Scottish and Irish had arrived as employees of Buenos Aires Great Southern Railway.

The English educational institution, St. Alban's College was established in the area about 1920.

Lomas de Zamora is located in a region that originally supported livestock, grain, fruit, and poultry farms. Present industries include meat packing, grain, and fruit processing, saw milling, and the manufacture of dairy products, chemicals, paper, rubber products, plastics, and leather goods.

The city is the site of the traditional Lomas Athletic Club, an agricultural school and an art museum. The Universidad de Lomas de Zamora (UNLZ) is one of the most important in the Greater Buenos Aires area. Founded in 1864 as Ciudad de La Paz, the city was given its current name in 1910; the art deco city hall was inaugurated in 1938.

The city's local football team is Los Andes, usually referred to as the "Mil rayitas" or "The thousand stripes" because of the design of the team's official jersey. Los Andes is currently playing in Argentina's National B Division; the team's home matches usually brings thousands of fans.

Eduardo Duhalde, a Justicialist Party figure elected mayor in 1983, was elected Vice President of Argentina in 1989, Governor of Buenos Aires Province in 1991, and was appointed interim President of Argentina, serving in 2002-03; he was among the candidates for the presidency in 2011.

Lomas de Zamora experienced one of the most significant real estate booms in the Greater Buenos Aires area in the years following the 2001 crisis in Argentina. This trend has been most evident along Colombres Street (south of downtown), creating an upscale district popularly known as Las Lomitas. Nearly 200 new residential high-rises had thus been completed by 2011. A four-star, 26-story Howard Johnson's hotel was slated to open in 2013, becoming the first of its kind in the southern belt of the Greater Buenos Aires area, but after several years of delay the project has been abandoned in 2015 when investor Finarg went broke. In October 2018 two local business men were detained for alleged irregularities in the planning of the hotel.

== Notable people ==
- Damián Albil (born 1979), footballer
- Hugo Arana (1943–2020), actor
- Sebastián Blanco (born 1988), footballer
- Leandro Brey (born 2002), footballer
- Ángel de Brito (born 1976), entertainment journalist
- Germán Cano (born 1988), footballer
- Eduardo Duhalde (born 1941), President of Argentina between 2002 and 2003
- Joaquín Furriel (born 1974), actor
- Alicia Genovese (born 1953), poet and essayist
- Hilda González de Duhalde (born 1946), First Lady of Argentina (2002–2003) and former Senator
- Julio César Grassi (born 1956), Roman Catholic priest and convicted child molester and fraudster
- Elena Highton de Nolasco (born 1942), lawyer and judge, former member of the Supreme Court of Justice of Argentina
- Aníbal Ibarra (born 1958), lawyer and former politician, Mayor of Buenos Aires between 2000 and 2006
- Martín Insaurralde (born 1970), former politician and former Mayor of Lomas de Zamora
- Julián Maidana (born 1972), footballer

== Gallery ==
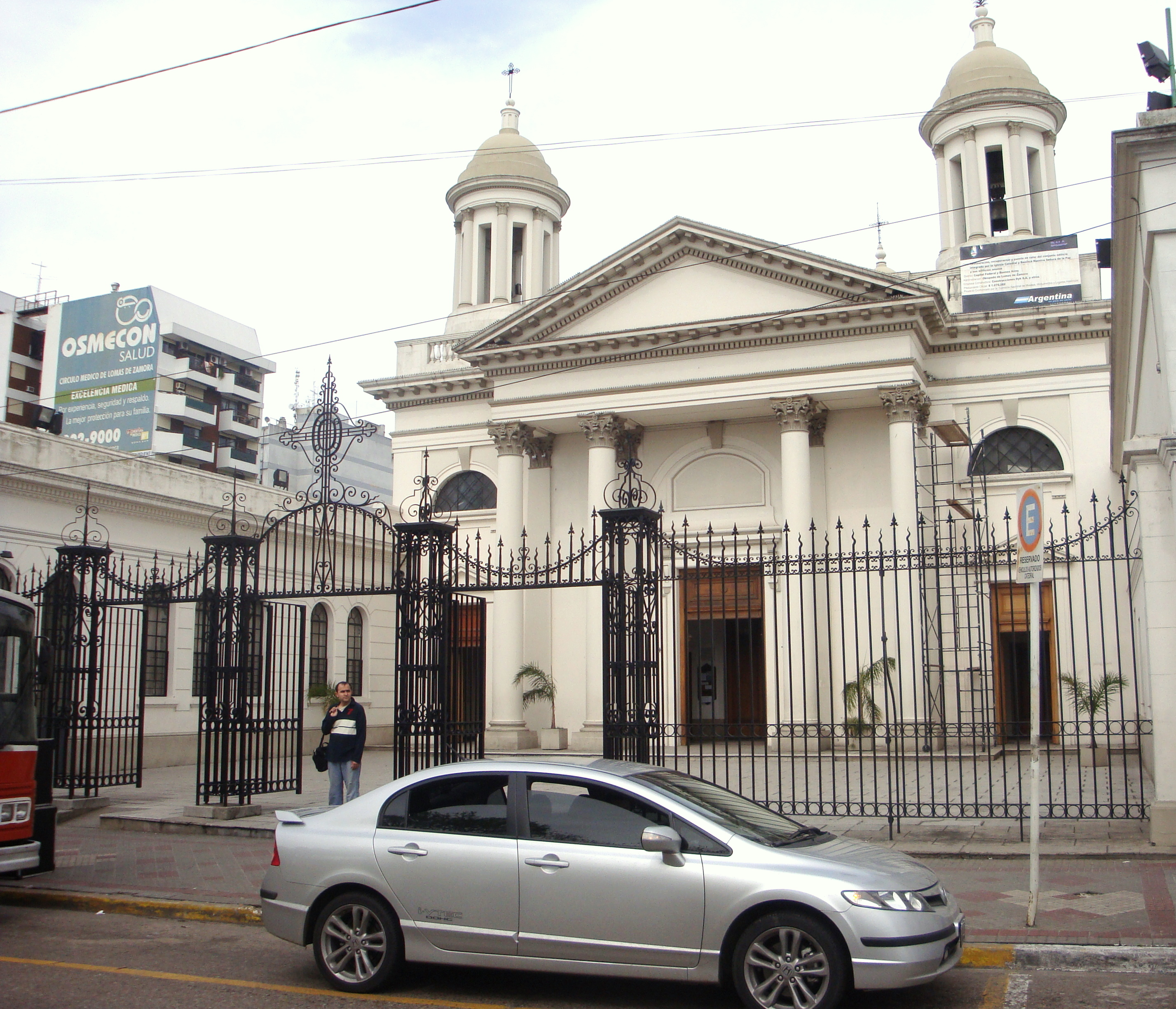
Cathedral of Our Lady of Peace

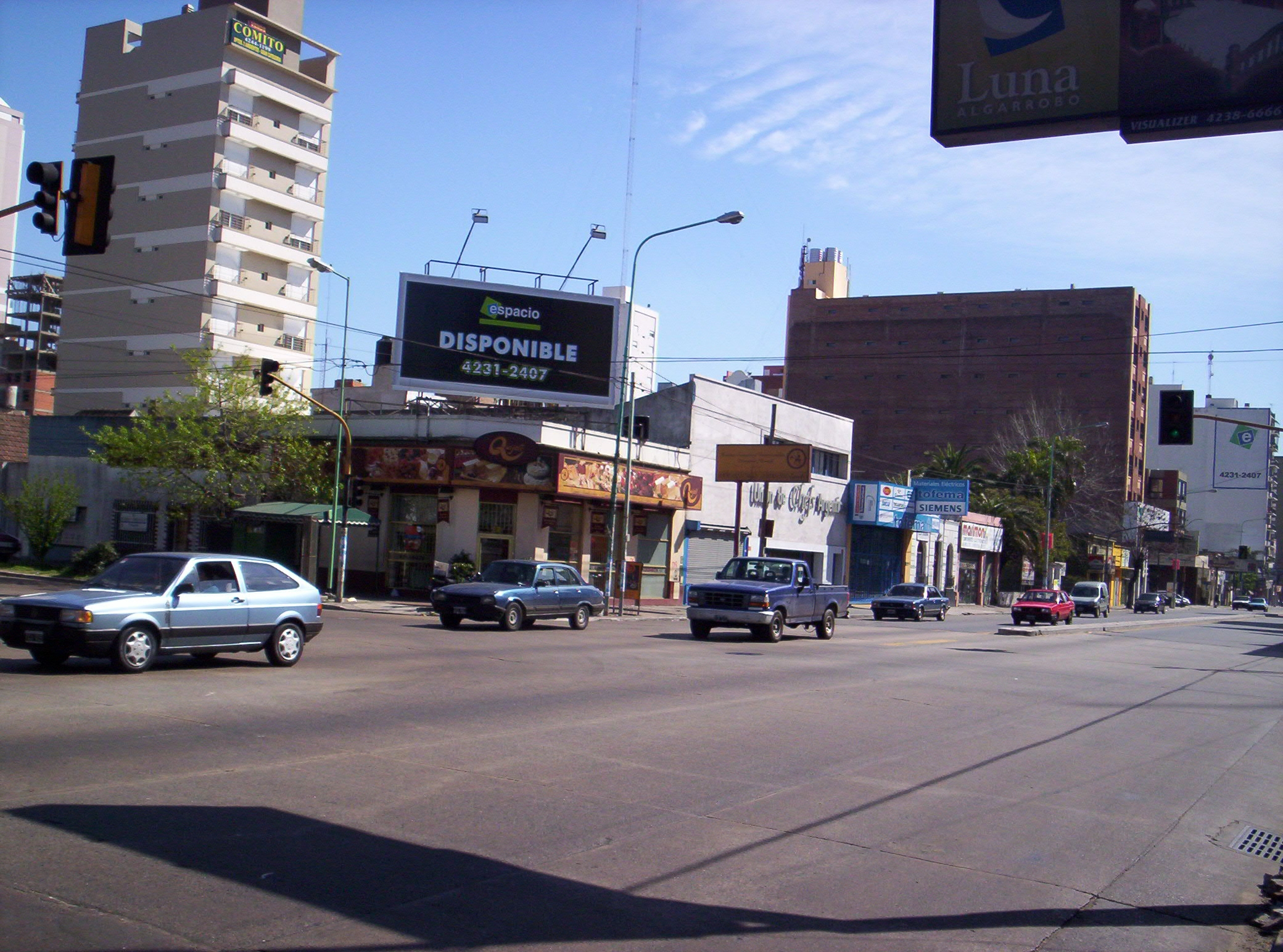
Hipólito Yrigoyen Avenue

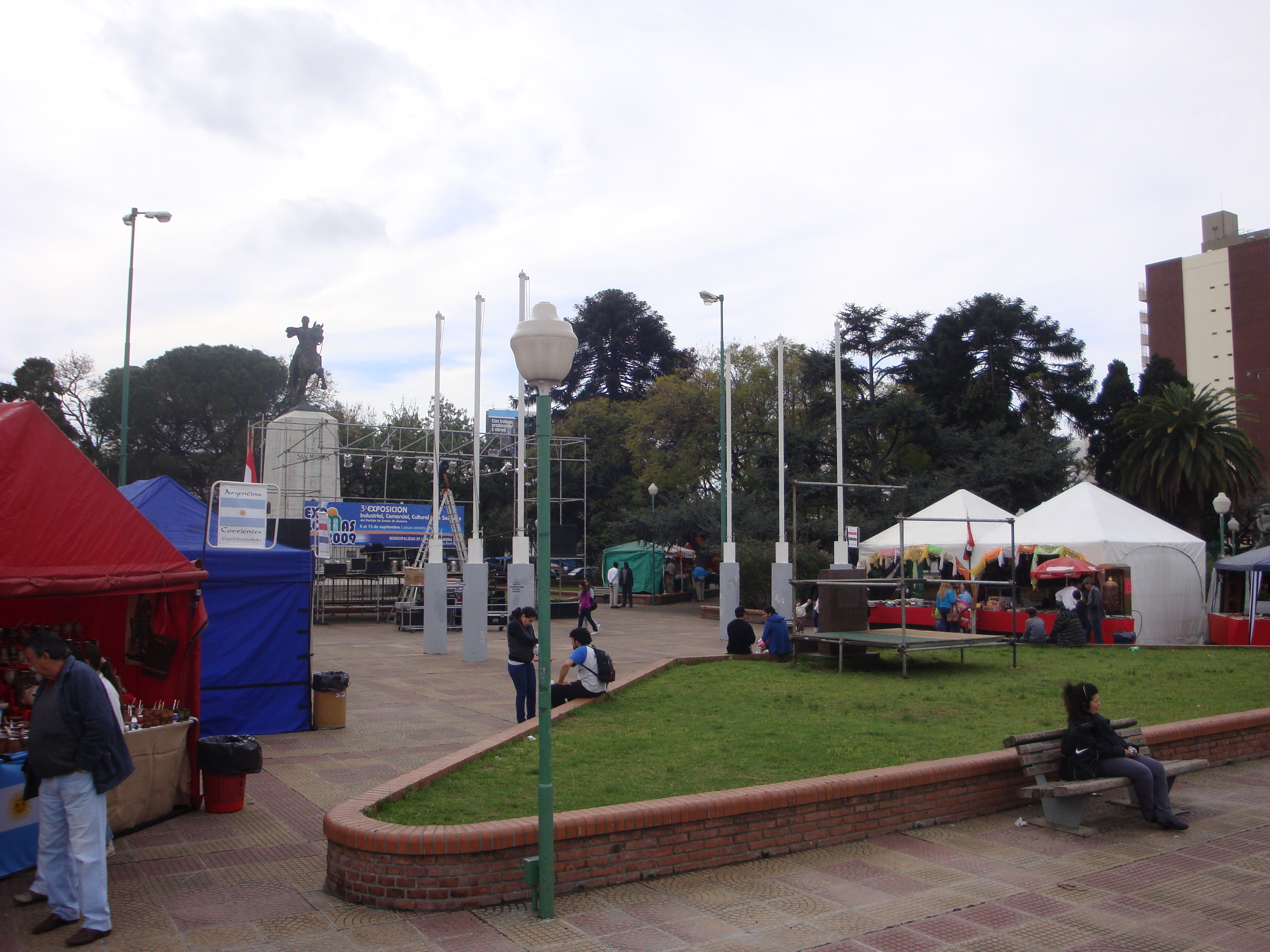
Victorio Grigera Square

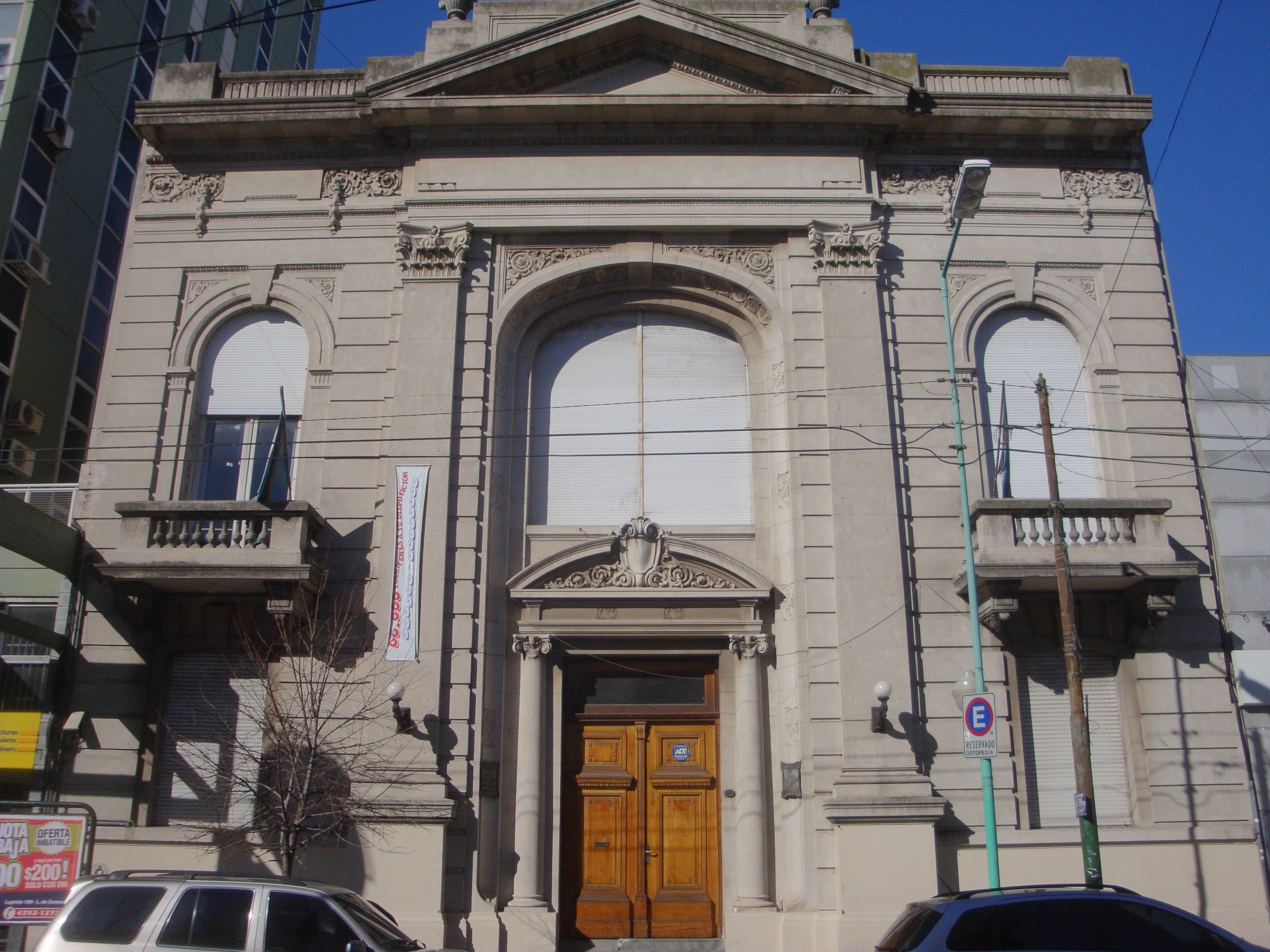
Antonio Mentruyt Library

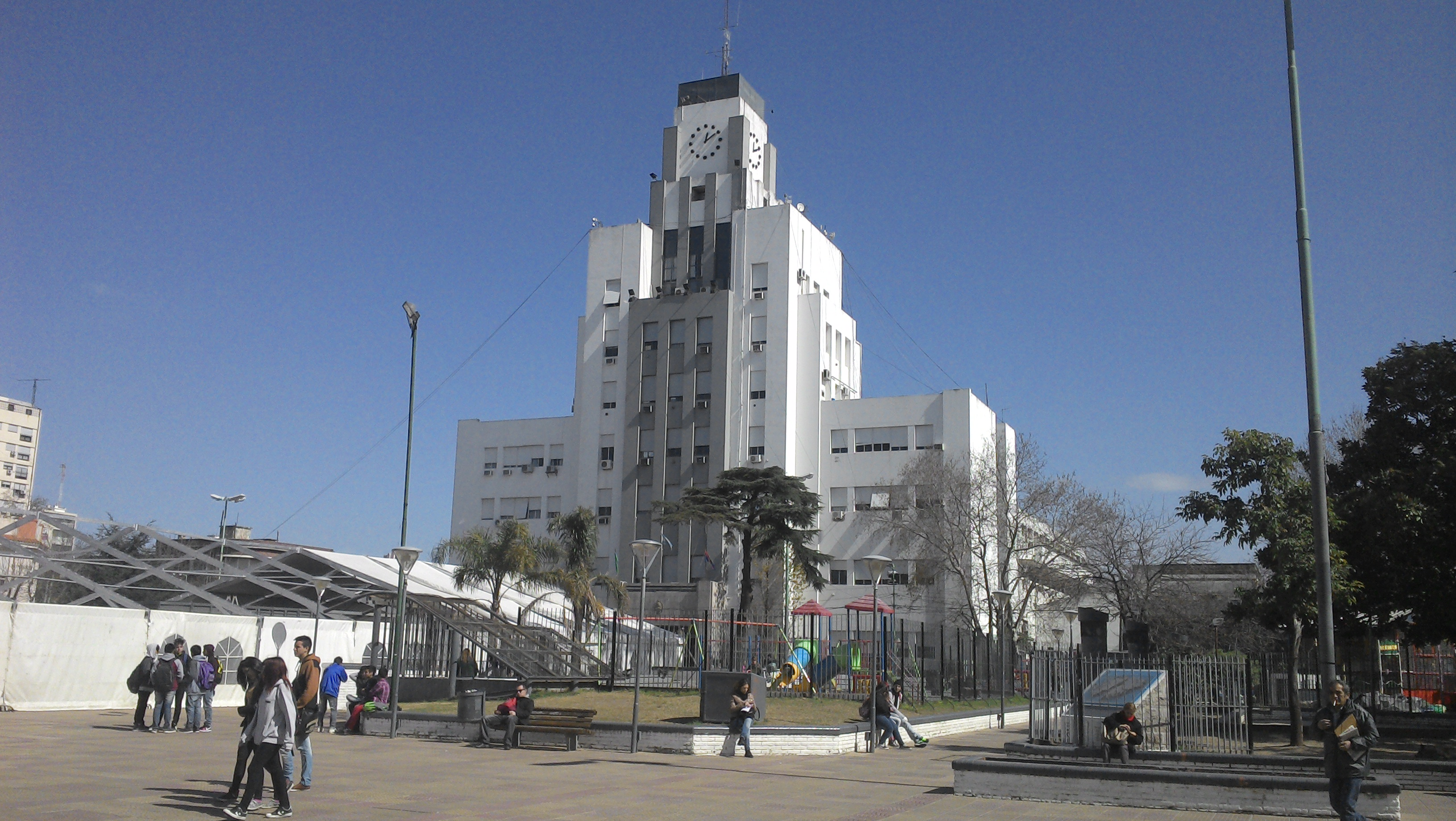
Municipal building

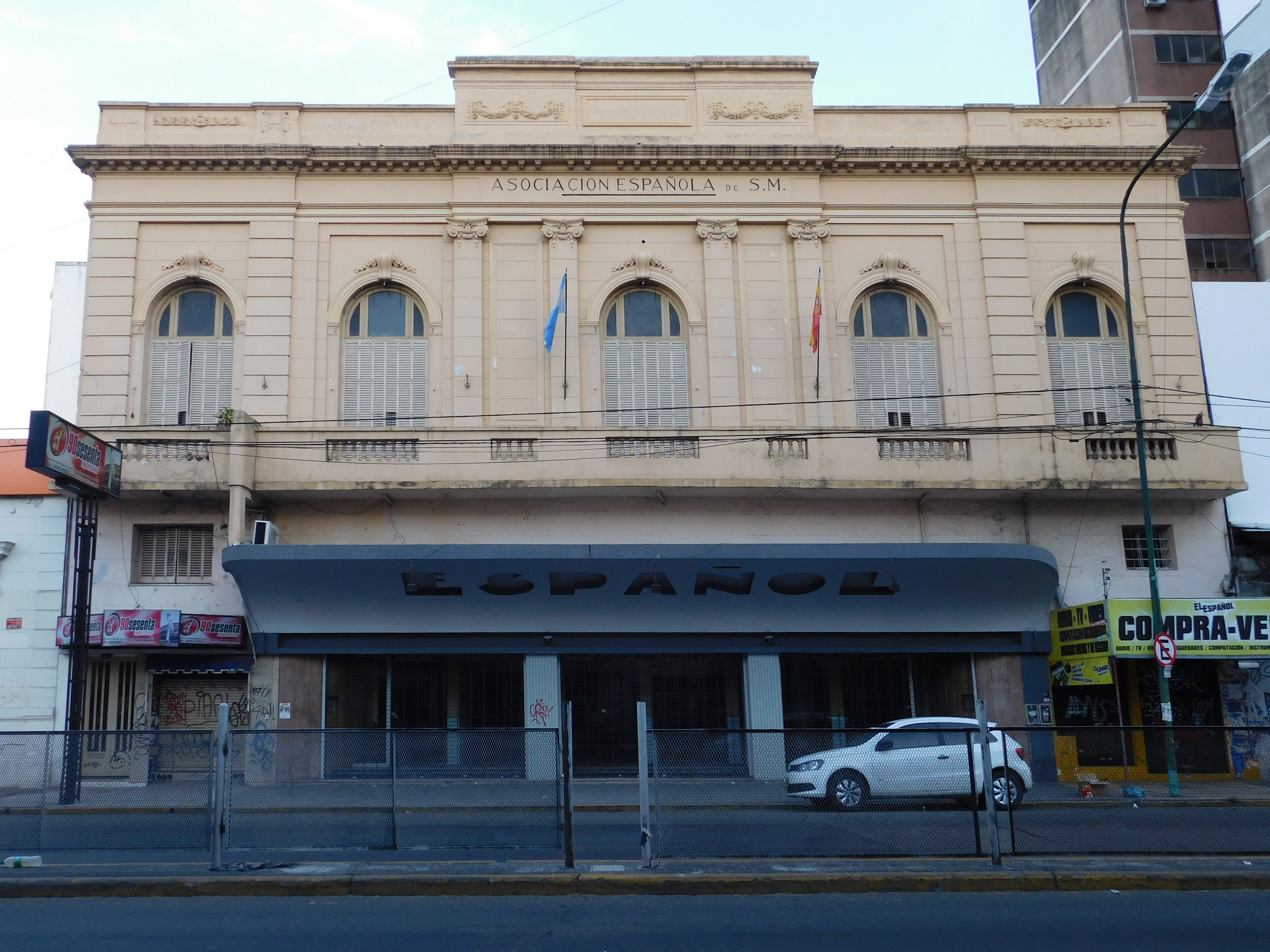
Cine Teatro Español of Lomas de Zamora

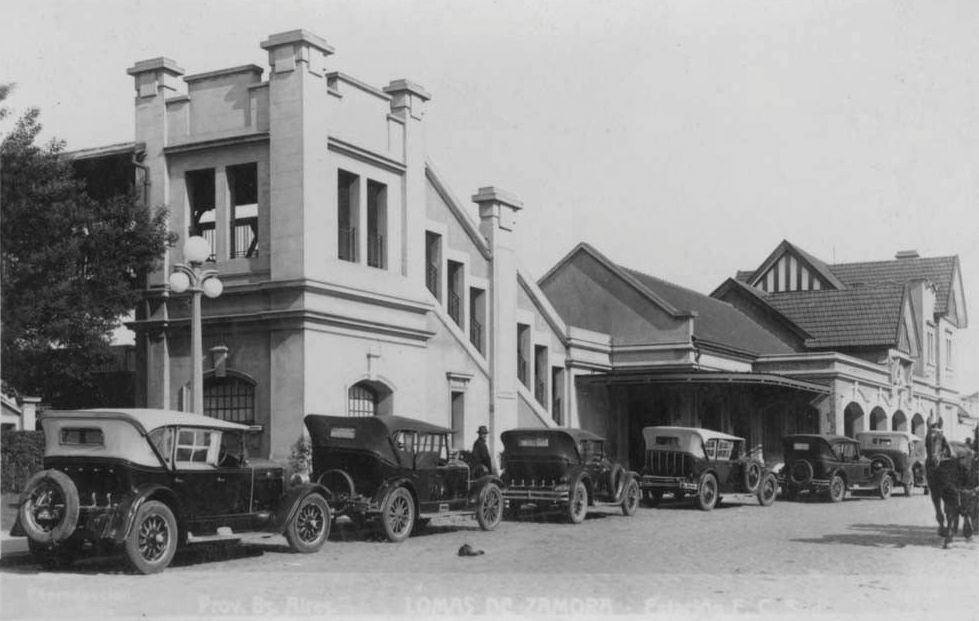
Lomas de Zamora station, c. 1925.

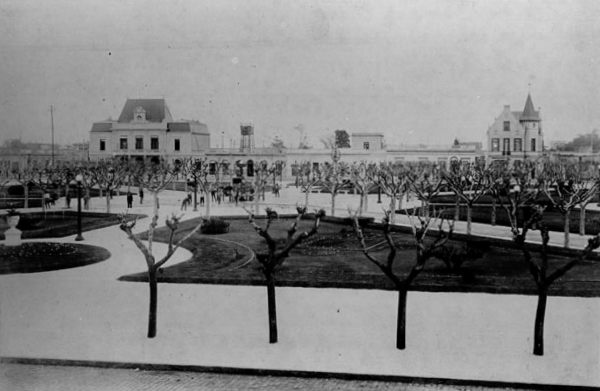
Plaza Victorio Grigera in 1885

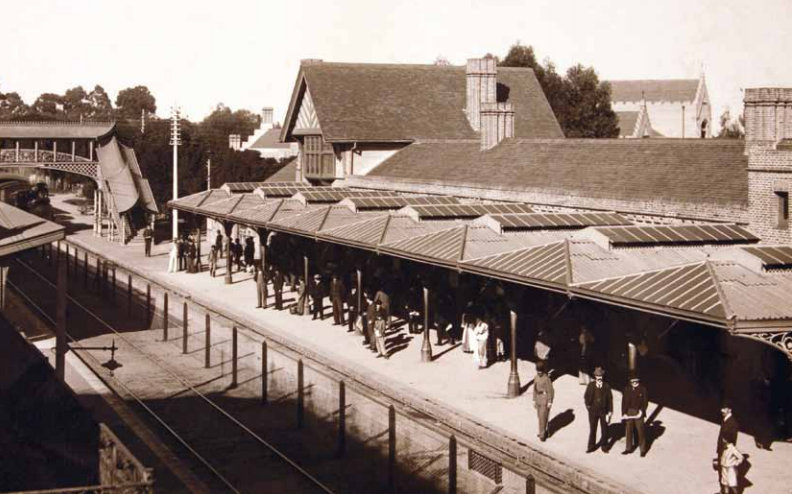
Train Station, c.1900
