= Diocese of Morón =

Catholic ecclesiastical territory

Diocese of Morón Dioecesis Moronensis Diócesis de Morón

Catholic
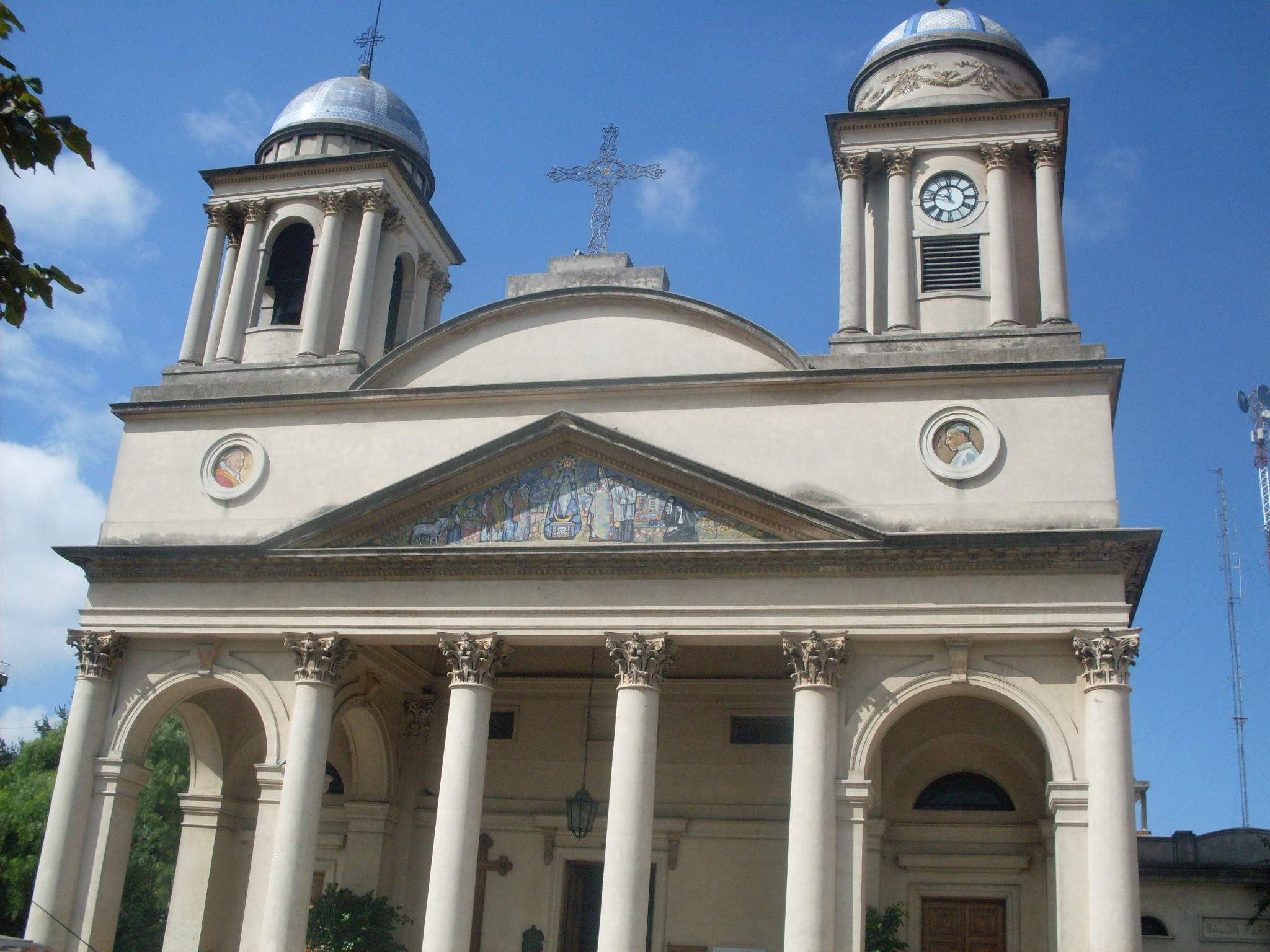
- Cathedral Basilica of the Immaculate Conception of the Good Journey

Location
- Country: Argentina
- Ecclesiastical province: Buenos Aires
- Metropolitan: Buenos Aires

Statistics
- Area: 130 km^{2} (50 sq mi)
- Population: Total; Catholics: (as of 2004); 655,000; 511,737 (78%)

Information
- Denomination: Catholic Church
- Sui iuris church: Latin Church
- Rite: Roman Rite
- Established: 11 February 1957 (69 years ago)
- Cathedral: Cathedral Basilica of the Immaculate Conception in Morón
- Patron saint: Immaculate Conception

Current leadership
- Pope: Leo XIV
- Bishop: Alejandro Pablo Benna
- Metropolitan Archbishop: Jorge Ignacio García Cuerva

The Diocese of Morón is a Latin Church ecclesiastical territory or diocese of the Catholic Church in Argentina. It is a suffragan diocese in the ecclesiastical province of the metropolitan Archdiocese of Buenos Aires in Argentina.

Its cathedra is a Minor Basilica : Catedral Basílica Inmaculada Concepción del Buen Viaje, in Morón, Buenos Aires, in the Argentine province of Buenos Aires, capital of the Morón partido, in the Greater Buenos Aires metropolitan area.

== History ==
The Diocese of Morón was established on 11 February 1957 as Diocese of Morón / Moronen(sis) (Latin), on territory split off from Archdiocese of La Plata (not its Metropolitan). It was partioned three times: on 10 April 1961 to establish Diocese of San Martín (also from part of Diocese of San Isidro), on 18 July 1969 to establish Diocese of San Justo (also from part of Diocese of Lomas de Zamora) and on 13 May 1997 to establish Diocese of Merlo–Moreno.

In the 1990s, a priest in the Diocese was accused of sexually abusing a boy; civil authorities found the accusation to be credible while Archbishop Bergiglio (later Pope Francis) disagreed.

== Statistics ==
As per 2014, it pastorally served 664,000 Catholics (90.7% of 732,000 total) on 130 km^{2} in 53 parishes with 69 priests (53 diocesan, 16 religious), 30 deacons, 86 lay religious (25 brothers, 61 sisters) and 5 seminarians.

== Bishops ==
=== Episcopal Ordinaries ===
- Miguel Raspanti, S.D.B. (1957.03.13 – retired 1980.01.22), died 1991
- Justo Oscar Laguna (1980.01.22 – retired 2004.11.30), died 2011
- Luis Guillermo Eichhorn (2004.11.30 – retired 2017.06.30), died 2022
- Jorge Vázquez (2017.06.30 – retired 2025.05.28)
- Alejandro Pablo Benna (2025.05.28 – present)

=== Coadjutor bishop ===
- Jorge Vázquez (2017)

=== Auxiliary bishops ===
- Fernando María Bargalló (1994.04.27 – 1997.05.13), appointed Bishop of Merlo-Moreno
- Carlos Walter Galán Barry (1981.02.11 – 1991.05.08), appointed Archbishop of La Plata

=== Other priests of this diocese who became bishops ===
- Gerardo Tomás Farrell, appointed Coadjutor Bishop of Quilmes in 1997
- José Antonio Gentico, appointed Auxiliary Bishop of Buenos Aires in 2001
- Santiago Olivera, appointed Bishop of Cruz del Eje in 2008
- Gabriel Bernardo Barba (priest here, 1989-1997), appointed Bishop of Gregorio de Laferrere in 2013
- Oscar Eduardo Miñarro (priest here, 1995-1997), appointed Auxiliary Bishop of Merlo-Moreno in 2016
- Fernando Miguel Gil Eisner (priest here, 1983-1997), appointed Bishop of Salto, Uruguay in 2018

== See also ==
- List of Catholic dioceses in Argentina

== Sources and external links ==
- GCatholic - data for all sections ^{[self-published]}
- "Diocese of Morón". Catholic-Hierarchy. ^{[self-published]}
