= Pope Francis =

Head of the Catholic Church from 2013 to 2025

- Bishop of Rome
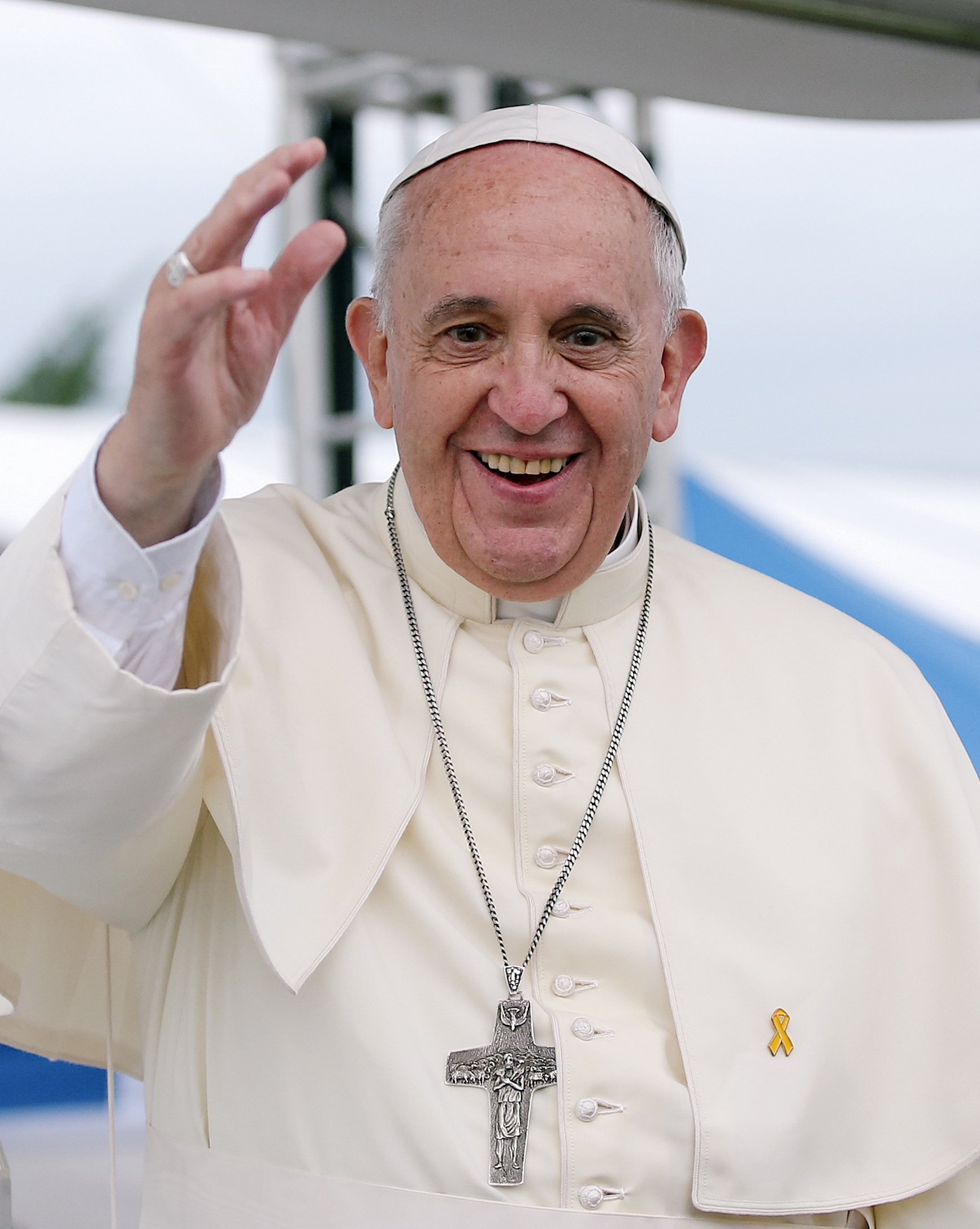
- Francis in 2014
- Church: Catholic Church
- Papacy began: 13 March 2013
- Papacy ended: 21 April 2025
- Predecessor: Benedict XVI
- Successor: Leo XIV
Previous posts
Previous posts	Provincial Superior of the Jesuits in Argentina (1973‍–‍1979); Titular Bishop of Auca (1992‍–‍1997); Auxiliary Bishop of Buenos Aires (1992‍–‍1997); Coadjutor Archbishop of Buenos Aires (1997‍–‍1998); Archbishop of Buenos Aires (1998‍–‍2013); Ordinary for the Faithful of the Eastern Rites in Argentina (1998‍–‍2013); Cardinal Priest of San Roberto Bellarmino (2001‍–‍2013); President of the Argentine Episcopal Conference (2005‍–‍2011)

Orders
- Ordination: 13 December 1969 by Ramón José Castellano
- Consecration: 27 June 1992 by Antonio Quarracino
- Created cardinal: 21 February 2001 by John Paul II
- Rank: Cardinal priest

Personal details
- Born: Jorge Mario Bergoglio; 17 December 1936 Buenos Aires, Argentina
- Died: 21 April 2025 (aged 88) Domus Sanctae Marthae, Vatican City
- Buried: Santa Maria Maggiore, Rome, Italy
- Education: Maximum College of St. Joseph; Philosophical and Theological Faculty of San Miguel; Milltown Institute of Theology and Philosophy; Sankt Georgen Graduate School of Philosophy and Theology
- Motto: Miserando atque eligendo (Latin for 'By having mercy and by choosing') (Note: Press reports have provided a variety of translations for the phrase. According to Vatican Radio: "Pope Francis has chosen the motto Miserando atque eligendo, meaning 'lowly but chosen'; literally in Latin 'by having mercy, by choosing him'. The motto is one Francis used as bishop. It is taken from the homilies of the Venerable Bede on Saint Matthew's Gospel relating to his vocation: 'Jesus saw the tax collector and by having mercy chose him as an apostle saying to him: Follow me.'")
- Signature: Francis's signature

- Coat of arms: Francis's coat of arms

Ordination history
History
Priestly ordination
- Ordained by: Ramón José Castellano
- Date: 13 December 1969
Episcopal consecration
- Principal consecrator: Antonio Quarracino
- Co-consecrators: Ubaldo Calabresi; Emilio Ogñénovich
- Date: 27 June 1992
- Place: Buenos Aires Metropolitan Cathedral, Buenos Aires
Cardinalate
- Elevated by: Pope John Paul II
- Date: 21 February 2001
Episcopal succession
Bishops consecrated by Pope Francis as principal consecrator
- Horacio Ernesto Benites Astoul: 1 May 1999
- Jorge Rubén Lugones: 30 July 1999
- Jorge Eduardo Lozano: 25 March 2000
- Joaquín Mariano Sucunza: 21 October 2000
- José Antonio Gentico: 28 April 2001
- Fernando Carlos Maletti: 18 September 2001
- Andrés Stanovnik: 16 December 2001
- Mario Aurelio Poli: 20 April 2002
- Eduardo Horacio García: 16 August 2003
- Adolfo Armando Uriona: 8 May 2004
- Eduardo Maria Taussig: 25 September 2004
- Raúl Martín: 20 May 2006
- Hugo Manuel Salaberry Goyeneche: 21 August 2006
- Óscar Vicente Ojea Quintana: 2 September 2006
- Hugo Nicolás Barbaro: 4 July 2008
- Enrique Eguía Seguí: 11 October 2008
- Ariel Edgardo Torrado Mosconi: 13 December 2008
- Luis Alberto Fernández Alara: 27 March 2009
- Vicente Bokalic Iglic: 29 May 2010
- Alfredo Zecca: 18 August 2011
- Jean-Marie Speich: 24 October 2013
- Giampiero Gloder: 24 October 2013
- Fernando Vérgez Alzaga: 15 November 2013
- Fabio Fabene: 30 May 2014
- Angelo De Donatis: 9 November 2015
- Miguel Ángel Ayuso Guixot: 19 March 2016
- Peter Bryan Wells: 19 March 2016
- Waldemar Stanisław Sommertag: 19 March 2018
- Alfred Xuereb: 19 March 2018
- José Avelino Bettencourt: 19 March 2018
- Alberto Lorenzelli Rossi: 22 June 2019
- Michael F. Czerny: 4 October 2019
- Paolo Borgia: 4 October 2019
- Antoine Camilleri: 4 October 2019
- Paolo Rudelli: 4 October 2019
- Guido Marini: 17 October 2021
- Andrés Gabriel Ferrada Moreira: 17 October 2021

Pope Francis (Note: Latin: Franciscus; Italian: Francesco; Spanish: Francisco.) (born Jorge Mario Bergoglio; (Note: Pronounced [ˈxoɾxe ˈmaɾjo βeɾˈɣoɣljo] in Spanish and [berˈɡɔʎʎo] in Italian.) 17 December 1936 – 21 April 2025) was the head of the Catholic Church and sovereign of Vatican City from his election in 2013 until his death in 2025. He was the first Jesuit pope, the first Latin American, and the first pope born or raised outside Europe since the 8th-century Syrian pope Gregory III.

Born and raised in Buenos Aires, Argentina, to a family of Italian origin, Bergoglio was inspired to join the Jesuits in 1958 after recovering from a severe illness. He was ordained a Catholic priest in 1969, and from 1973 to 1979 he was the Jesuit provincial superior in Argentina. He became the archbishop of Buenos Aires in 1998 and was created a cardinal in 2001 by Pope John Paul II. Following the resignation of Pope Benedict XVI, the 2013 papal conclave elected Bergoglio as pope on 13 March. He chose Francis as his papal name in honor of Francis of Assisi.

Throughout his papacy, Francis was noted for his humility, emphasis on God's mercy, international visibility, commitment to interreligious dialogue, and concern for the poor, migrants, and refugees. He made women and laymen full members of dicasteries in the Roman Curia. He believed the Catholic Church should demonstrate more inclusivity to LGBTQ people, and permitted non-liturgical blessings of individuals in same-sex relationships in the Latin Church. He also convened the Synod on Synodality, which was described as the culmination of his papacy and the most important event in the Catholic Church since the Second Vatican Council. He was well known for having a less formal approach to the papacy than his predecessors by, for instance, choosing to reside in the Domus Sanctae Marthae guesthouse rather than in the papal apartments of the Apostolic Palace used by previous popes. In addition, due to both his Jesuit and Ignatian aesthetic, he was known for favoring simpler vestments devoid of ornamentation, including refusing the traditional papal mozzetta cape upon his election, choosing silver instead of gold for his piscatory ring, and keeping the same iron pectoral cross he had as cardinal.

Concerning global governance, Francis was a critic of trickle-down economics, consumerism, and overdevelopment; he made action on climate change a leading focus of his papacy. He viewed capital punishment as inadmissible in all cases, and committed the Catholic Church to its worldwide abolition. Francis criticized the rise of right-wing populism and anti-immigration politics, calling the protection of migrants a "duty of civilization", and called for the decriminalization of homosexuality. In international diplomacy, he also helped to restore diplomatic relations between Cuba and the United States, negotiated a deal with China to define Communist Party influence in appointing Chinese bishops, and encouraged peace between Israel and Palestinians, signing the Vatican's first treaty with Palestine and condemning Israel's military operations in Gaza, as well as calling for investigations of war crimes. In 2022, he apologized for the Church's role in the Canadian Indian residential school system. Following a period of declining health and multiple scares, Francis made his last public appearance on Easter Sunday before dying on 21 April 2025, Easter Monday. The 2025 conclave elected Leo XIV as Francis's successor on 8 May, becoming the second pope from the Americas, after Francis.

== Early life ==
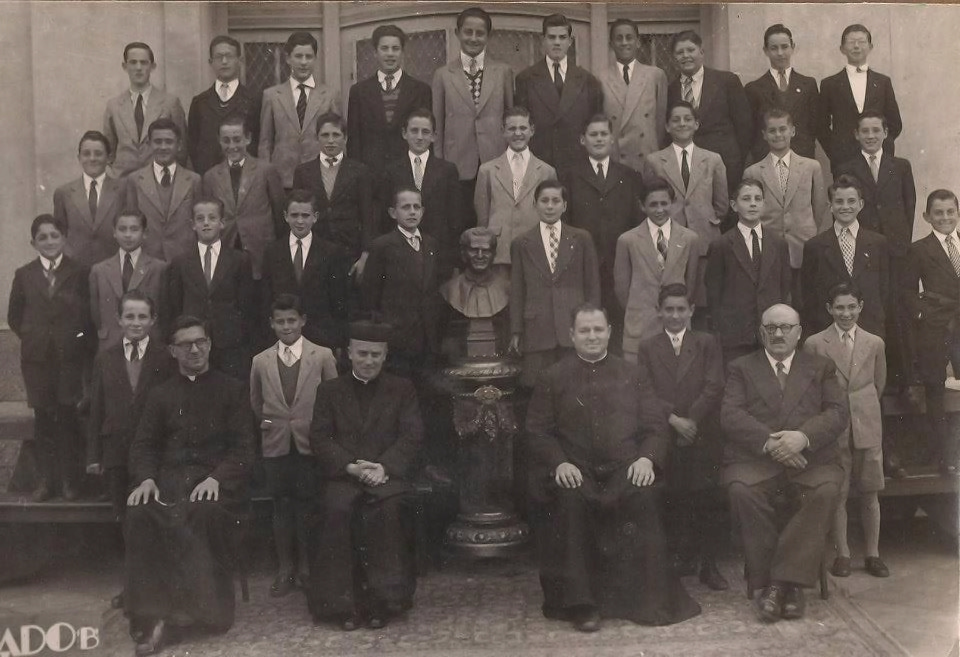
Jorge Mario Bergoglio (fourth boy from the left in the third row from the top) at age 12, Salesian College (c. 1948–1949)

Jorge Mario Bergoglio was born on 17 December 1936 in Flores, a neighbourhood of Buenos Aires. He was the eldest of the five children of Mario José Bergoglio and Regina María Sívori. Mario Bergoglio was an Italian immigrant and an accountant from Piedmont. Regina Sívori was a housewife born in Buenos Aires to a family of northern Italian origin. Mario Bergoglio's family left Italy in 1929 to escape the fascist rule of Benito Mussolini. According to María Elena Bergoglio, the Pope's only living sibling, the family did not emigrate for economic reasons. His other siblings were Oscar Adrián, Marta Regina, and Alberto Horacio. His niece, Cristina Bergoglio, is a painter based in Madrid, Spain.

In the sixth grade, Bergoglio attended Wilfrid Barón de los Santos Ángeles, a school of the Salesians of Don Bosco in Ramos Mejía, Buenos Aires Province. He then attended the technical secondary school Escuela Técnica Industrial Nº 27 Hipólito Yrigoyen and graduated with a chemical technician's diploma. In that capacity, he spent several years working in the food section of Hickethier-Bachmann Laboratory where he worked under Esther Ballestrino. Earlier, he had been a bouncer and a janitor.

When he was 21 years old, after life-threatening pneumonia and three cysts, Bergoglio had part of a lung excised.

== Priesthood ==
=== Training and early priesthood (1958–1973) ===
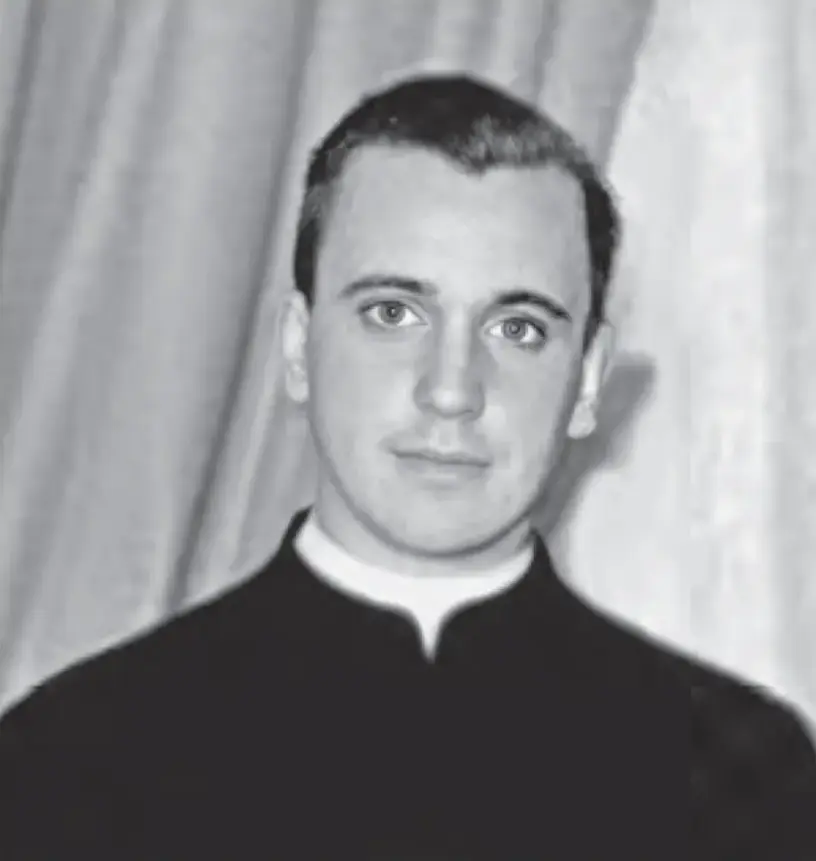
Bergoglio at an Argentine seminary where he studied for the priesthood in the 1950s

While on his way to celebrate the Spring Day, Bergoglio passed by a church to go to confession and was inspired by a priest. He then studied at the archdiocesan seminary, Inmaculada Concepción Seminary, in Villa Devoto, Buenos Aires, and, after three years, entered the Society of Jesus as a novice on 11 March 1958. Bergoglio said that, as a young seminarian, he had a crush on a girl and briefly doubted his religious career. As a Jesuit novice, he studied the humanities in Santiago, Chile.

After his novitiate, Bergoglio officially became a Jesuit on 12 March 1960 when he made the religious profession of the initial, perpetual vows of poverty, chastity and obedience of a member of the order. In 1960, Bergoglio obtained a licentiate in philosophy from the Colegio Máximo de San José. He then taught literature and psychology at the Colegio de la Inmaculada Concepción, a high school in Santa Fe, from 1964 to 1965. In 1966, he taught the same courses at Colegio del Salvador in Buenos Aires.

In 1967, Bergoglio began his theological studies at Facultades de Filosofía y Teología de San Miguel. On 13 December 1969, he was ordained as a priest by Archbishop Ramón José Castellano. He served as the master of novices for the province there and became a professor of theology.

Bergoglio completed his final stage of spiritual training as a Jesuit, tertianship, at Alcalá de Henares, Spain, and took final vows as a Jesuit, including the fourth vow of obedience to missioning by the pope, on 22 April 1973.

=== Subsequent positions (1973–1986) ===
Bergoglio was named provincial superior of the Society of Jesus in Argentina that July for a six-year term which ended in 1979. In 1973, he made a pilgrimage to Jerusalem, but his stay was shortened by the outbreak of the Yom Kippur War.

After the completion of his term of office, he was named, in 1980, the rector of the Philosophical and Theological Faculty of San Miguel where he had studied. Before taking up this new appointment, he spent the first three months of 1980 in Ireland to learn English and stayed at the Jesuit Centre at the Milltown Institute of Theology and Philosophy, Dublin. He then served at San Miguel for six years until 1986 when, at the discretion of Jesuit superior-general Peter Hans Kolvenbach, he was replaced by someone more in tune with the worldwide trend in the Society of Jesus toward emphasizing social justice rather than his emphasis on popular religiosity and direct pastoral work.

Bergoglio then spent several months at the Sankt Georgen Graduate School of Philosophy and Theology in Frankfurt and considered possible dissertation topics. He settled on exploring the work of the German-Italian theologian Romano Guardini, particularly his study of "Contrast" published in his 1925 work Der Gegensatz.

=== Return to Argentina (1986–1998) ===
Ultimately, Bergoglio did not complete a degree there and he returned to Argentina earlier than expected to serve as a confessor and spiritual director to the Jesuit community in Córdoba. As a student at the Salesian school, Bergoglio was mentored by Ukrainian Greek Catholic priest Stefan Czmil. Bergoglio often rose hours before his classmates to serve Divine Liturgy for Czmil.

Bergoglio was named Auxiliary Bishop of Buenos Aires in 1992 and was consecrated on 27 June 1992 as titular bishop of Auca, with Cardinal Antonio Quarracino, archbishop of Buenos Aires, serving as principal consecrator. He chose his episcopal motto to be Miserando atque eligendo, drawn from Saint Bede's homily on Matthew 9:9–13: "because he saw him through the eyes of mercy and chose him". In 1992, Jesuit authorities asked Bergoglio not to live in Jesuit residences due to ongoing tensions with leaders and scholars; concerns about his "dissent", views on Catholic orthodoxy, and opposition to liberation theology; and his role as auxiliary bishop of Buenos Aires.

On 3 June 1997, Bergoglio was appointed coadjutor archbishop of Buenos Aires.

== Archbishop of Buenos Aires (1998–2013) ==
He became metropolitan archbishop after Quarracino's death on 28 February 1998. As archbishop, he established new parishes, restructured the archdiocese, led pro-life efforts, and formed a commission on divorces. One of Bergoglio's major initiatives as archbishop was to increase the church's presence in the shantytown (villa miseria, or just villa) slums of Buenos Aires. Under his leadership, the number of priests assigned to work in the shantytowns doubled, and he visited them himself. This work led to him being referred to as the "villero bishop", sometimes translated as the "slum bishop".

Early in his tenure as archbishop, Bergoglio sold the archdiocese's bank shares and moved its accounts to regular international banks. This ended the church's high spending habits, which had nearly led to its bankruptcy, and enforced stricter fiscal discipline. On 6 November 1998, while remaining archbishop of Buenos Aires, Bergoglio was named Ordinary for Eastern Catholics in Argentina, who lacked a prelate of their own church. On Bergoglio's election to the papacy, Major Archbishop Sviatoslav Shevchuk said that Bergoglio understood the liturgy, rites, and spirituality of Shevchuk's Ukrainian Greek Catholic Church and always "took care of our Church in Argentina" as Ordinary.

In 2000, Bergoglio was the only church official to reconcile with Jerónimo Podestá, a former bishop who had been suspended as a priest after opposing the Argentine Revolution military dictatorship in 1972. He also defended Podestá's wife from Vatican attacks on their marriage. That same year, Bergoglio said the Argentine Catholic Church needed "to put on garments of public penance for the sins committed during the years of the dictatorship" in the 1970s, during the Dirty War.

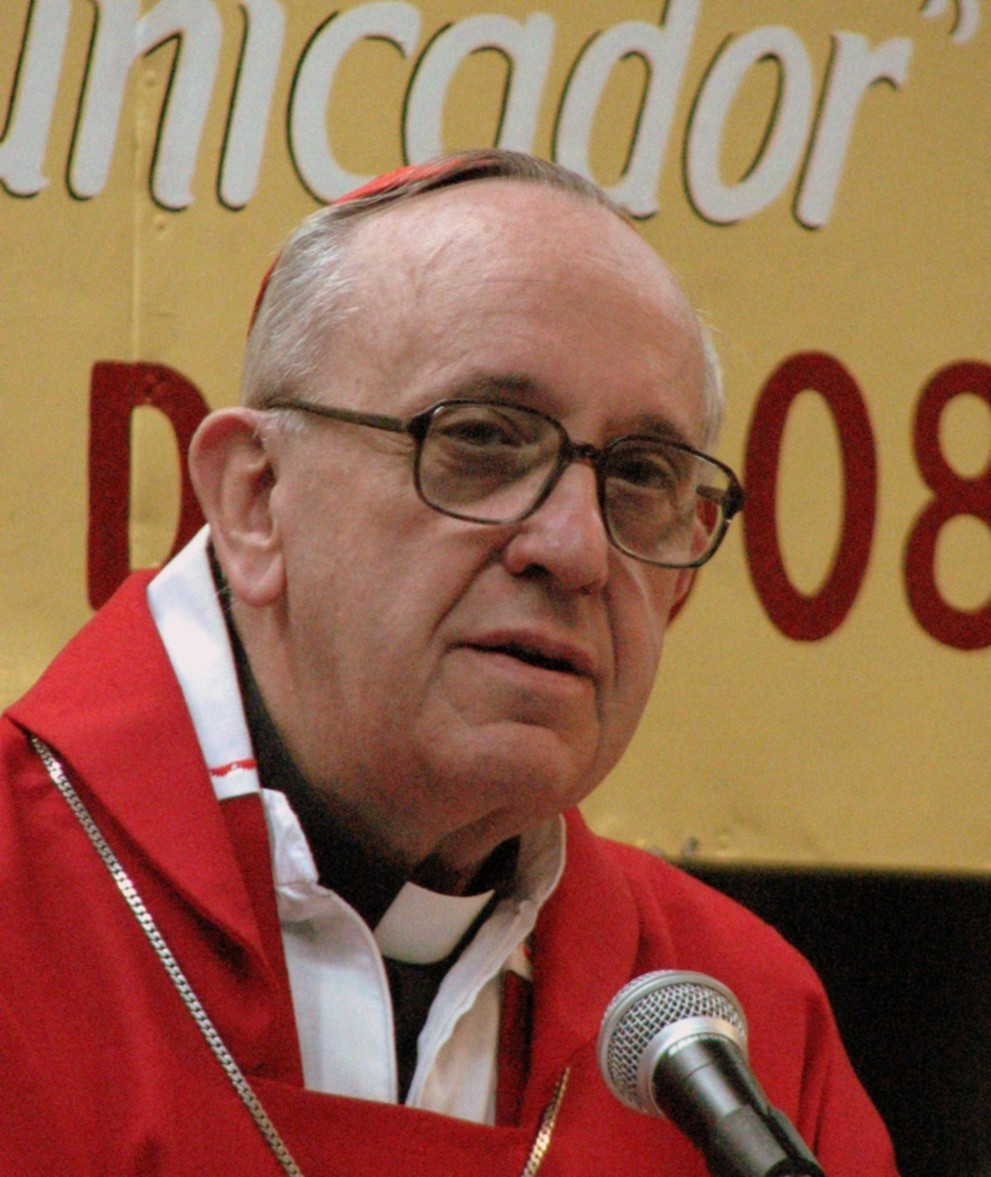
Bergoglio in 2008

Bergoglio regularly celebrated the Holy Thursday foot-washing ritual in jails, hospitals, retirement homes, and slums. Bergoglio continued to be the archbishop of Buenos Aires after his elevation to the cardinalate in 2001. In 2007, shortly after Benedict XVI introduced new rules for pre–Vatican II liturgical forms, Bergoglio established a weekly Mass in this extraordinary form of the Roman Rite.

On 8 November 2005, Bergoglio was elected president of the Argentine Episcopal Conference for a three-year term (2005–2008), and re-elected on 11 November 2008. He remained a member of that commission's permanent governing body, the president of its committee for the Pontifical Catholic University of Argentina, and a member of its liturgy committee for the care of shrines. While head of the Argentine Catholic bishops' conference, Bergoglio issued a collective apology for his church's failure to protect people from the junta during the Dirty War. When he turned 75 in December 2011, Bergoglio submitted his resignation as archbishop of Buenos Aires to Pope Benedict XVI as required by canon law. As he had no coadjutor archbishop, he stayed in office, waiting for the Vatican to appoint a replacement.

As a bishop, he was no longer subject to his Jesuit superior. From then on, he no longer visited Jesuit houses and was in "virtual estrangement from the Jesuits" until after his election as pope.

=== Appointment as cardinal ===
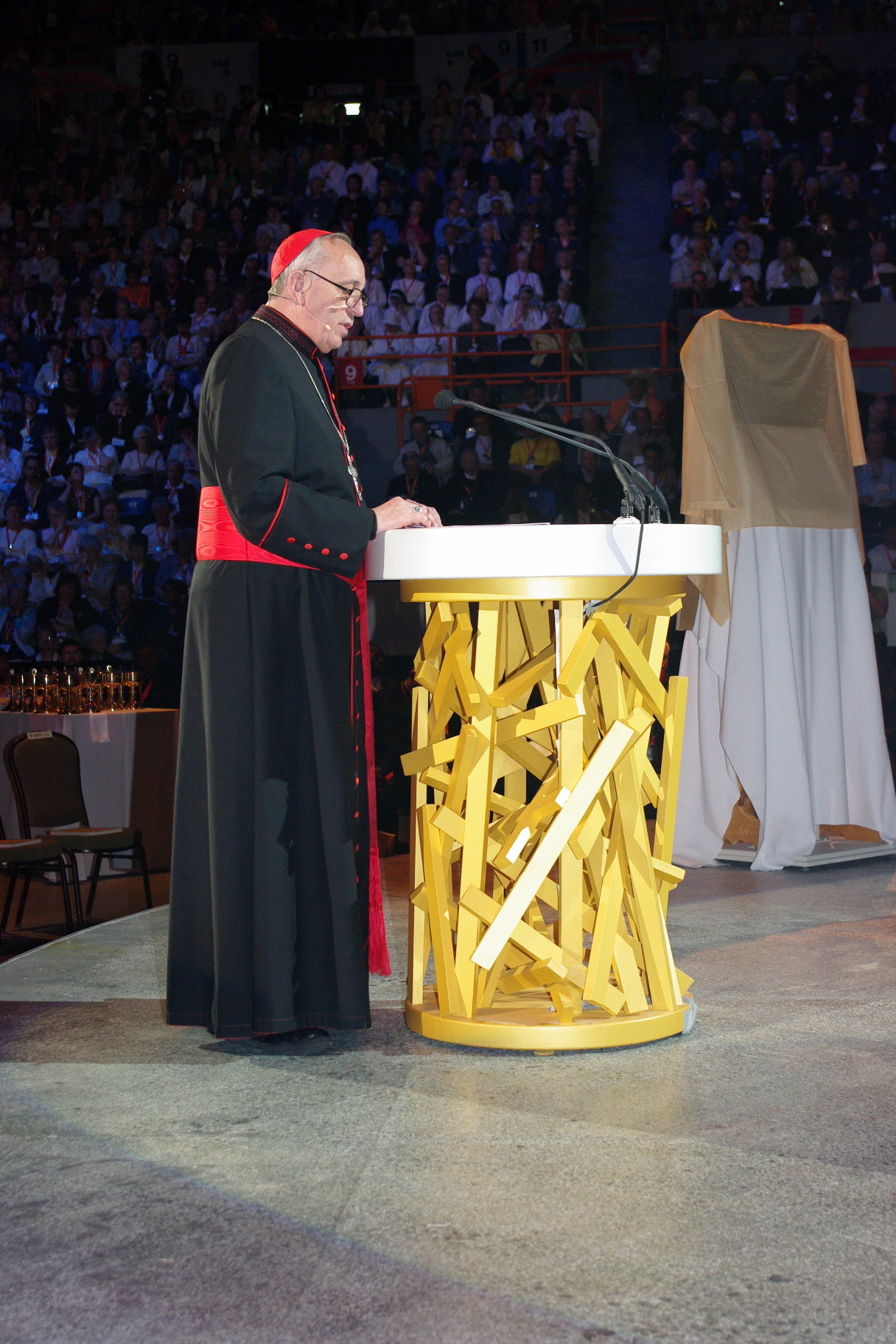
Bergoglio on 18 June 2008 giving a catechesis

On 21 February 2001, Pope John Paul II made Archbishop Bergoglio a cardinal, assigning him the title of cardinal priest of San Roberto Bellarmino. Bergoglio was installed there on 14 October. During his trip to Rome for the ceremony, he and his sister María Elena visited their father's hometown in northern Italy. As cardinal, Bergoglio was appointed to five administrative positions in the Roman Curia. He was a member of the Congregation for Divine Worship and the Discipline of the Sacraments; the Congregation for the Clergy; the Congregation for Institutes of Consecrated Life and Societies of Apostolic Life; the Pontifical Council for the Family; and the Commission for Latin America. Later that year, when Cardinal Edward Egan returned to New York following the September 11 attacks, Bergoglio replaced him as relator (recording secretary) in the Synod of Bishops, and, according to the Catholic Herald, created "a favourable impression as a man open to communion and dialogue".

Cardinal Bergoglio was known for his personal humility, doctrinal conservatism, and commitment to social justice. His simple lifestyle—which included living in a small apartment rather than the elegant bishop's residence, using public transportation, and cooking his own meals—enhanced his reputation for humility. He limited his time in Rome to "lightning visits".

After Pope John Paul II died on 2 April 2005, Bergoglio attended his funeral and was considered one of the papabile for succession to the papacy. He participated as a cardinal elector in the 2005 papal conclave that elected Pope Benedict XVI. In the National Catholic Reporter, John L. Allen Jr. reported that Bergoglio was a frontrunner in the 2005 conclave. In September 2005, the Italian magazine Limes published claims that Bergoglio had been the runner-up and main challenger to Cardinal Ratzinger at that conclave and that he had received 40 votes in the third ballot but fell back to 26 at the fourth and decisive ballot. The claims were based on a diary purportedly belonging to an anonymous cardinal who had been present at the conclave. According to the Italian journalist Andrea Tornielli, this number of votes had no precedent for a Latin American papabile. La Stampa reported that Bergoglio was in close contention with Ratzinger during the election until he made an emotional plea that the cardinals should not vote for him. According to Tornielli, Bergoglio made this request to prevent the conclave from delaying too much in the election of a pope.

As a cardinal, Bergoglio was associated with Communion and Liberation, a Catholic evangelical lay movement of the type known as associations of the faithful. He sometimes made appearances at the annual gathering known as the Rimini Meeting held during the late summer months in Italy. In 2005, Cardinal Bergoglio authorized the request for beatification—the third of four steps toward sainthood—for six members of the Pallottine community murdered in the San Patricio Church massacre. Bergoglio also ordered an investigation into the murders; 1984 testimony indicated that they were perpetrated by members of the Argentine Navy on the orders of Rear Admiral Rubén Chamorro.

== Argentine government relations ==
=== Dirty War ===
Bergoglio was the subject of allegations regarding the Argentine Navy's kidnapping of two Jesuit priests, Orlando Yorio and Franz Jalics, in 1976, during Argentina's Dirty War. After being tortured in captivity, the priests were found alive months later outside Buenos Aires, drugged and partially unclothed. Bergoglio is widely reported to have failed to protect the priests, and to have dismissed them from the Society of Jesus days prior to their arrest. In 2005, Myriam Bregman, a human rights lawyer, filed a criminal complaint against Bergoglio, as superior in the Society of Jesus of Argentina, accusing him of actual involvement in the kidnapping. While the complaint was eventually dismissed, the debate over Bergoglio's actions during the period has continued, with Argentine journalists relying on documents and statements from both priests and laypeople in reporting that contradict Cardinal Bergoglio's account.

Yorio accused Bergoglio of effectively handing them over to the death squads by declining to tell the authorities that he endorsed their work. Yorio said in a 1999 interview that he believed that Bergoglio did nothing "to free us, in fact just the opposite". Two days after the election of Francis, Jalics issued a statement confirming the kidnapping and attributing the cause to a former lay colleague who became a guerrilla, was captured, then named Yorio and Jalics when interrogated. The following week, Jalics issued a second, clarifying statement: "It is wrong to assert that our capture took place at the initiative of Father Bergoglio ... Orlando Yorio and I were not denounced by Father Bergoglio."

Bergoglio told his authorized biographer, Sergio Rubin, that he worked behind the scenes for the priests' release; Bergoglio's intercession with dictator Jorge Rafael Videla on their behalf may have saved their lives. Bergoglio also told Rubin that he had often sheltered people from the dictatorship on church property, and once gave his own identity papers to a man who looked like him so that he could flee Argentina. The interview with Rubin, reflected in the biography El jesuita, was the only time Bergoglio had spoken to the press about those events. Alicia Oliveira, a former Argentine judge, also reported that Bergoglio helped people flee Argentina during the rule of the junta. Since Francis became pope, Gonzalo Mosca and José Caravias have related accounts to journalists of how Bergoglio helped them flee the dictatorship.

Oliveira described Bergoglio as "anguished" and "very critical of the dictatorship" during the Dirty War. Oliveira met with him at the time and urged Bergoglio to speak out—he told her that "he couldn't. That it wasn't an easy thing to do." Artist and human rights activist Adolfo Pérez Esquivel, the 1980 Nobel Peace Prize laureate, said: "Perhaps he didn't have the courage of other priests, but he never collaborated with the dictatorship... Bergoglio was no accomplice of the dictatorship." Graciela Fernández Meijide, a member of the Permanent Assembly for Human Rights, also said that there was no proof linking Bergoglio with the dictatorship. She told the Clarín newspaper:

There is no information and Justice couldn't prove it. I was in the APDH during all the dictatorship years and I received hundreds of testimonies. Bergoglio was never mentioned. It was the same in the CONADEP. Nobody mentioned him as instigator or as anything.

Ricardo Lorenzetti, the president of the Argentine Supreme Court, said that Bergoglio was "completely innocent" of the accusations. Historian Uki Goñi pointed that, during early 1976, the military junta still had a good image among society, and that the scale of the political repression was not known until much later; Bergoglio would have had little reason to suspect that the detention of Yorio and Jalics could end in their deaths.

=== Fernando de la Rúa ===
Fernando de la Rúa replaced Carlos Menem as president of Argentina in 1999. As an archbishop, Bergoglio celebrated the annual Mass at the Buenos Aires Metropolitan Cathedral on the First National Government holiday, 25 May. During Argentina's economic depression, the Catholic Church criticized the government's austerity measures, which worsened poverty. De la Rúa asked the church to facilitate dialogue between economic and political leaders to address the crisis. Although he claimed to have spoken with Bergoglio, Bergoglio reportedly said the meeting was canceled due to a misunderstanding. Bishop Jorge Casaretto had doubted this, noting that De la Rúa made the request only in newspaper interviews, not formally to the church.

In the 2001 elections, the Justicialist Party won a majority in Congress and appointed Ramón Puerta as Senate president. Bergoglio met with Puerta and was positively impressed. Puerta assured him that the Justicialist Party was not planning to oust De la Rúa and promised to support the president in advancing necessary legislation.

During police repression of the riots of December 2001, Bergoglio contacted the Ministry of the Interior and asked that the police distinguish rioters and vandals from peaceful protesters.

=== Néstor and Cristina Kirchner ===
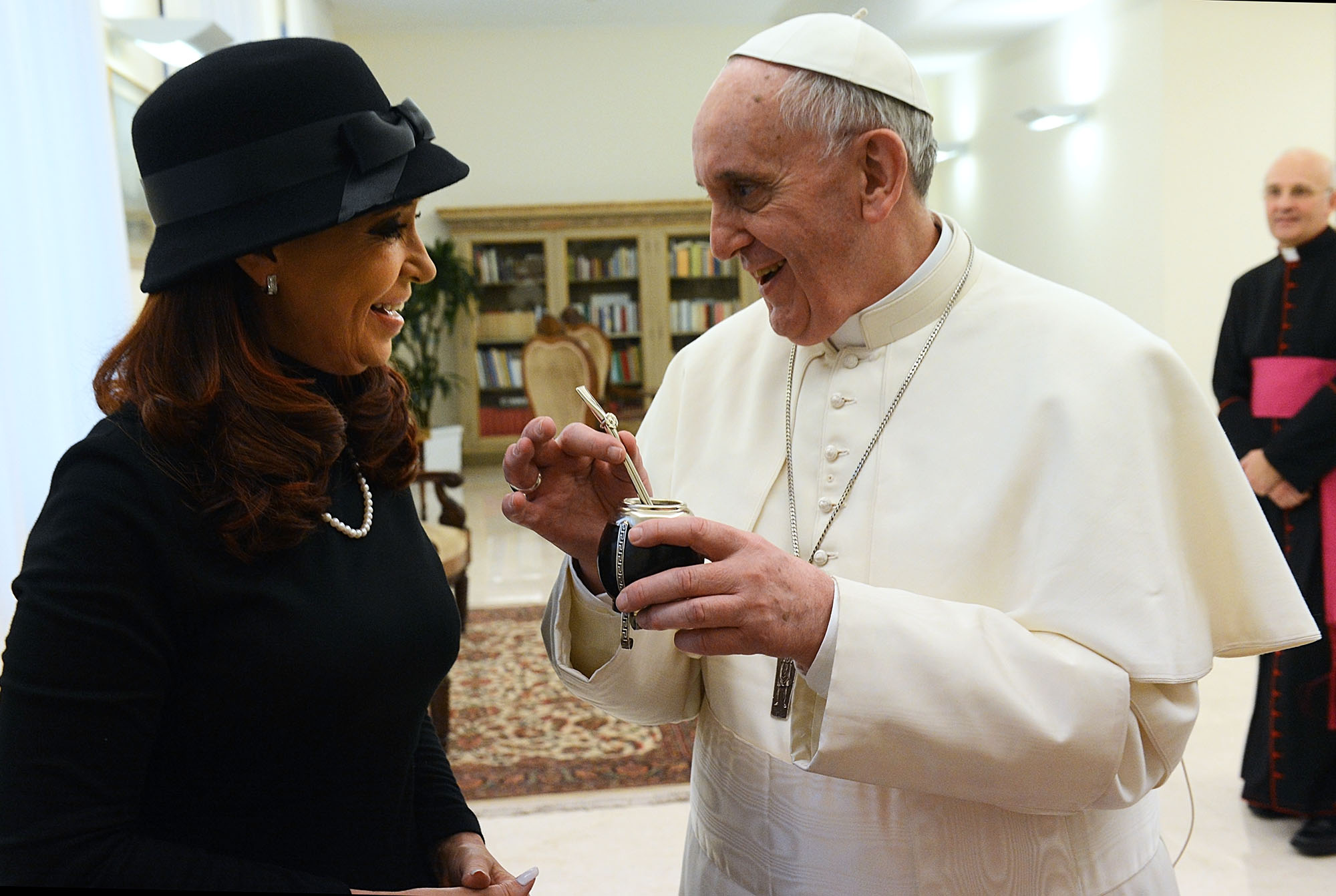
Francis with Argentine president Cristina Fernández de Kirchner, holding traditional Argentine mate drinkware

When Bergoglio celebrated Mass at the cathedral for the 2004 First National Government holiday, President Néstor Kirchner attended and heard Bergoglio request more political dialogue, the rejection of intolerance, and the criticism of exhibitionism and strident announcements. Kirchner celebrated the national day elsewhere the following year and the Mass in the cathedral was suspended. In 2006, Bergoglio helped fellow Jesuit Joaquín Piña win the elections in the Misiones Province and prevent an amendment to the local constitution that would allow indefinite re-elections. Kirchner intended to use that project to start similar amendments at other provinces and eventually implement it in the national constitution. Kirchner considered Bergoglio as a political rival until he died in 2010. Bergoglio's relations with Kirchner's widow and successor, Cristina Fernández de Kirchner, were similarly tense. In 2008, Bergoglio called for national reconciliation during disturbances in the country's agricultural regions, which the government interpreted as a support for anti-government demonstrators. The campaign to enact same-sex marriage legislation was a particularly tense period in their relations.

When Bergoglio was elected pope, initial reactions were mixed. Most of the Argentine society cheered it, but the pro-government newspaper Página 12 published renewed allegations about the Dirty War, and the president of the National Library described a global conspiracy theory. The president took more than an hour before congratulating the new pope and did so only in a passing reference within a routine speech. Due to the Pope's popularity in Argentina, Cristina Kirchner made what the political analyst Claudio Fantini called a "Copernican shift" in her relations with him and fully embraced the Francis phenomenon. On the day before his inauguration as pope, Bergoglio, now Francis, had a private meeting with Kirchner where they exchanged gifts and lunched together. This was the new pope's first meeting with a head of state, and there was speculation that the two were mending their relations. Página 12 then removed their controversial articles about Bergoglio from their web page as a result of this change.

=== Javier Milei ===
Before Javier Milei's election to the Argentine presidency in 2023, he was very critical of Francis, describing him as "imbecile" and a "communist turd". His disparaging comments sparked controversy among Catholics. However, following his inauguration, Milei softened his position and formally invited Francis to Argentina. Milei visited the Vatican on 11 February 2024, the day Francis canonized María Antonia de Paz y Figueroa, the first female Argentine saint.

== Papacy (2013–2025) ==
Coat of arms of Pope Francis

As cardinal

As pope

The gold star represents the Virgin Mary, the grape-like plant—the spikenard—is associated with Saint Joseph, and the IHS is the symbol of the Jesuits.

Francis was the first Jesuit pope. This was a significant appointment because of the sometimes tense relations between the Society of Jesus and the Holy See. He was also the first from Latin America, and the first from the Southern Hemisphere. Many media reported him as being the first non-European pope, but he was the 11th; the previous was Gregory III from Syria who died in 741. Although Francis was not born in Europe, he was ethnically European; his father and maternal grandparents were from northern Italy.

As pope, Francis's manner was less formal than that of his immediate predecessors, a style that news coverage referred to as "no frills", noting that it was "his common touch and accessibility that is proving the greatest inspiration". On the night of his election, he took a bus back to his hotel with the cardinals rather than being driven in the papal car. The next day, he visited Cardinal Jorge María Mejía in the hospital and chatted with patients and staff.

In addition to his native Spanish, he spoke fluent Italian (the official language of Vatican City and the "everyday language" of the Holy See) and German. He was also conversant in Latin (the official language of the Holy See), French, Portuguese, and English; he also understood Piedmontese and some Genoese Ligurian.

Francis chose not to live in the official papal residence in the Apostolic Palace but instead remained in the Vatican guest house in a suite in which he received visitors and held meetings. He was the first pope since Pope Pius X to live outside the papal apartments. Francis appeared at the window of the Apostolic Palace for the Sunday Angelus.

As a Jesuit pope, Francis made clear that a fundamental task of the faithful is not so much to follow rules but to discern what God is calling them to do. He altered the culture of the clergy, steering away from what he named "clericalism" (which dwells on priestly status and authority) and toward an ethic of service (Francis said the church's shepherds must have the "smell of the sheep", always staying close to the People of God).

=== Election ===
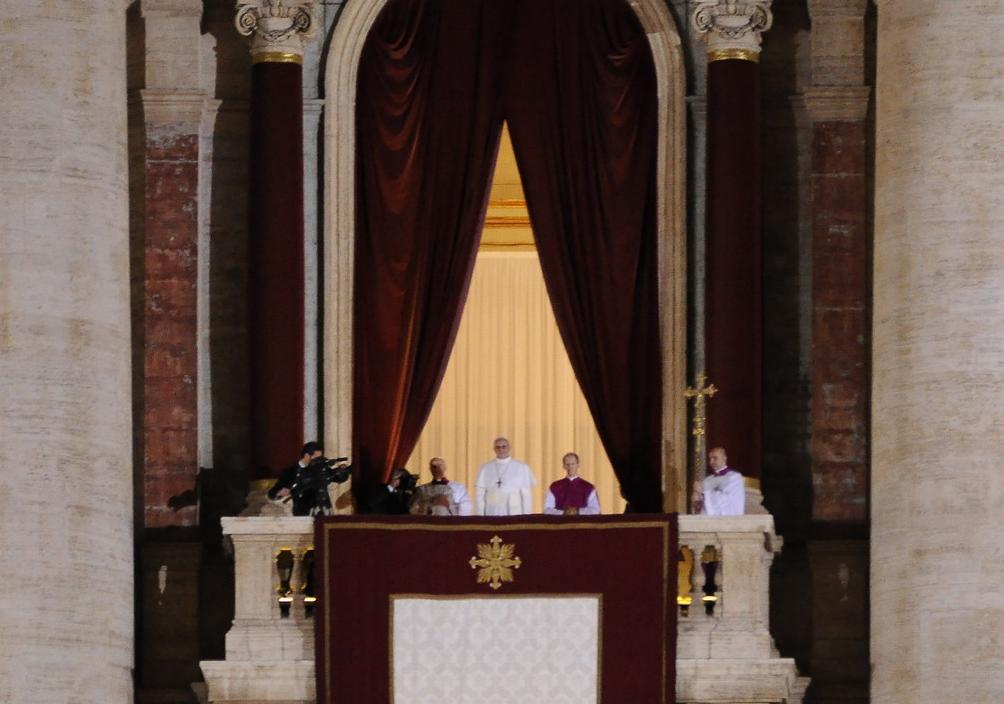
Francis appears in public for the first time as pope, at St. Peter's Basilica balcony, 13 March 2013

Bergoglio was elected pope on 13 March 2013, the second day of the 2013 papal conclave, after which he took the papal name Francis. Francis was elected on the fifth ballot. The Habemus papam announcement was delivered by the cardinal protodeacon, Jean-Louis Tauran. Cardinal Christoph Schönborn later said that Bergoglio was elected following two supernatural signs, one in the conclave—and hence confidential—and one from a Latin-American couple, friends of Schönborn at Vatican City, who whispered Bergoglio's name in the elector's ear; Schönborn commented "if these people say Bergoglio, that's an indication of the Holy Spirit".

Instead of accepting his cardinals' congratulations while seated on the papal throne, Francis received them standing, reportedly an immediate sign of a changing approach to formalities at the Vatican. During his first appearance as pontiff on the balcony of Saint Peter's Basilica, he wore a white cassock, instead of the red, ermine-trimmed mozzetta used by previous popes. He also wore the same iron pectoral cross that he had worn as archbishop of Buenos Aires, rather than the gold one worn by his predecessors.

After being elected and choosing his name, his first act was bestowing the Urbi et Orbi blessing on thousands of pilgrims gathered in St. Peter's Square. Before blessing the crowd, he delivered a brief speech, greeting those in St. Peter's Square with a simple "Buonasera" ("Good evening", in Italian). He thanked the crowd for welcoming him and asked them to pray for his predecessor, "the bishop emeritus of Rome" Pope Benedict XVI, and for himself as the new "bishop of Rome". He also referred to himself as a Pope coming almost from the end of the world.

Francis held his papal inauguration on 19 March 2013 in St. Peter's Square. He celebrated Mass in the presence of political and religious leaders from around the world. In his homily, Francis focused on the Solemnity of Saint Joseph, the liturgical day on which the Mass was celebrated.

The next day, Federico Lombardi told the media that Francis had met all the cardinals in the Sistine Chapel standing up, rather than sitting on the chair at his disposal, and that he went back to the Domus Sanctae Marthae in a minivan with the other cardinals, instead of using a private car. Afterward he went to the guest house where he had resided during the conclave, collected his belongings and insisted on paying the bill.

=== Name ===
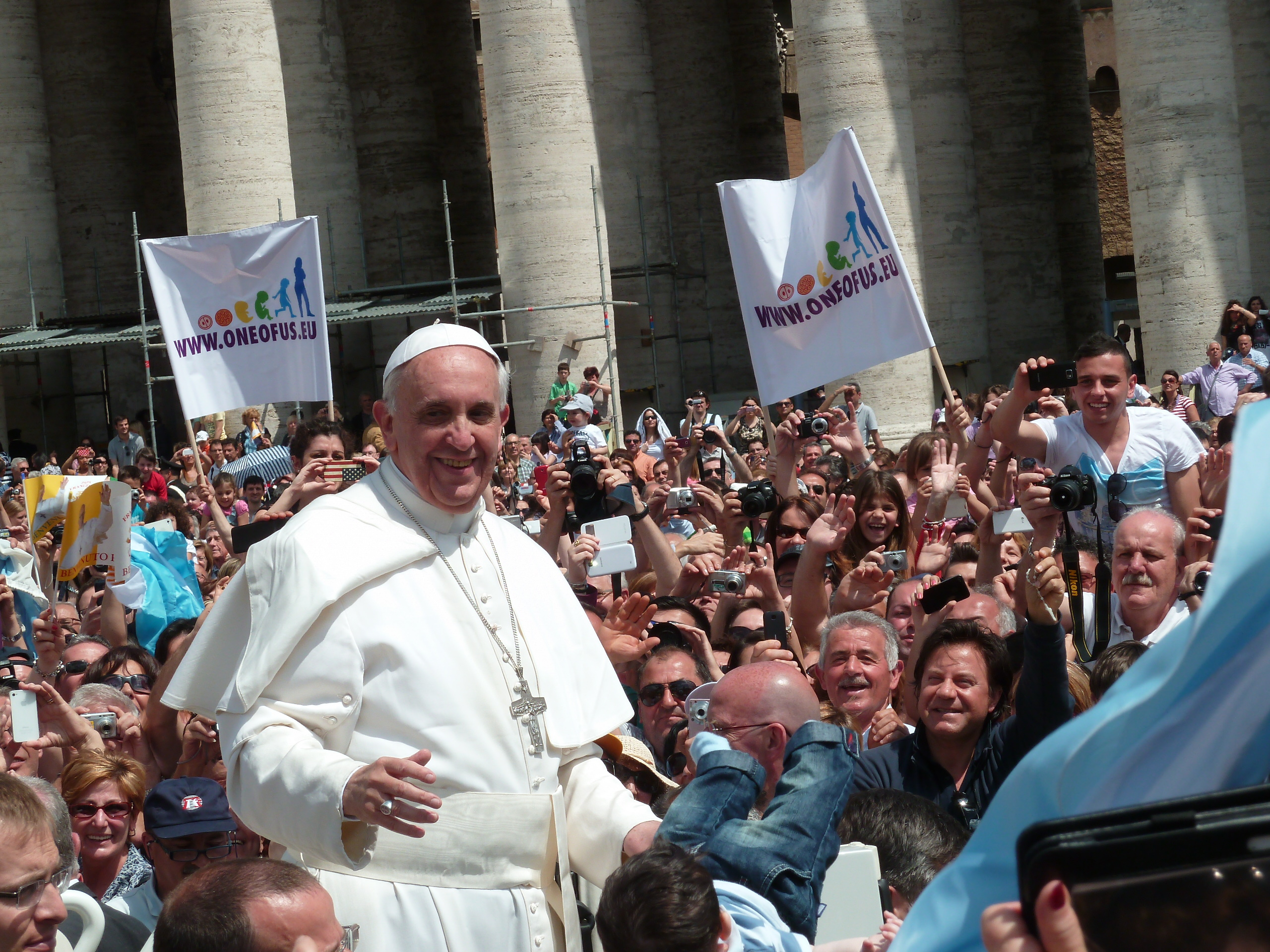
Francis in St. Peter's Square, two months after his election

At his first audience on 16 March 2013, Francis told journalists that he had chosen the name in honor of Saint Francis of Assisi and had done so because he was especially concerned for the well-being of the poor. He explained that, as it was becoming clear during the conclave voting that he would be elected, the Brazilian Cardinal Cláudio Hummes had embraced him and whispered, "Don't forget the poor", which made Bergoglio think of the saint. Bergoglio had previously expressed his admiration for St. Francis, explaining that: "He brought to Christianity an idea of poverty against the luxury, pride, vanity of the civil and ecclesiastical powers of the time. He changed history."

It was the first time that a pope had been named "Francis". On the day of his election, the Vatican clarified that his official papal name was "Francis" and not "Francis I"; that is, no regnal number was used for him. If there is a Francis II, then Francis will be known as Francis I. It was the first time since Lando's 913–914 pontificate that a canonical pope held a name not used by a predecessor. (Note: John Paul I, elected in 1978, took a new combination of already used names, in honor of his two immediate predecessors, John XXIII and Paul VI.)

Francis also said that some cardinal electors had jokingly suggested to him that he should choose either "Adrian", since Adrian VI had been a reformer of the church, or "Clement", to settle the score with Clement XIV who had suppressed the Jesuit order. Bergoglio, had he been elected in 2005, would have chosen the pontifical name of "John XXIV" in honor of John XXIII. He told Cardinal Francesco Marchisano: "John, I would have called myself John, like the Good Pope; I would have been completely inspired by him."

=== Curia ===
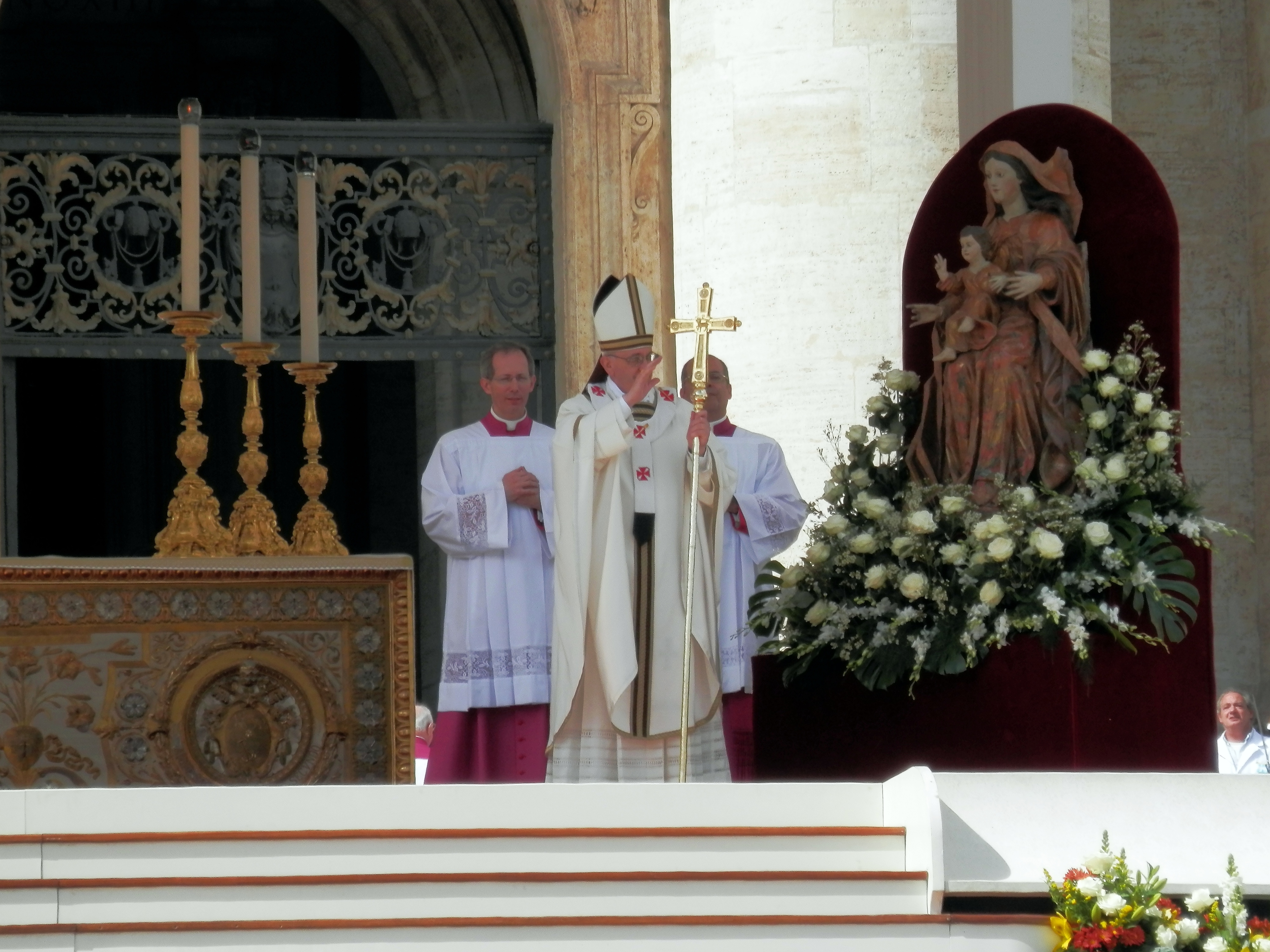
Inauguration of Francis, 19 March 2013

Francis abolished the bonuses paid to Vatican employees upon the election of a new pope, amounting to several million euros, opting instead to donate the money to charity. He also abolished the €25,000 annual bonus paid to cardinals serving on the Board of Supervisors for the Vatican bank.

On 13 April 2013, Francis named eight cardinals to a new Council of Cardinal Advisers to advise him on revising the organizational structure of the Roman Curia. The group included several known critics of Vatican operations and only one member of the Curia.

=== Early issues ===
On the first Holy Thursday following his election, Francis washed and kissed the feet of ten male and two female juvenile offenders imprisoned at Rome's Casal del Marmo detention facility, telling them the ritual of foot washing is a sign that he is at their service. This was the first time that a pope had included women in this ritual, although he had already done so when he was archbishop. One of the male and one of the female prisoners were Muslim.

On 31 March 2013, Francis used his first Urbi et Orbi Easter address to make a plea for world peace, specifically mentioning the Middle East, Africa, and North and South Korea. He also spoke out against those who give in to "easy gain" in a world filled with greed and made a plea for humanity to become a better guardian of creation by protecting the environment. Although the Vatican had prepared greetings in 65 languages, Francis chose not to read them. According to the Vatican, the pope "at least for now, feels at ease using Italian".

In 2013, Francis initially reaffirmed the Congregation for the Doctrine of the Faith's programme to reform the US Leadership Conference of Women Religious which had been initiated under his predecessor, Pope Benedict XVI. The New York Times reported that the Vatican had formed the opinion in 2012 that the sisters' group had some feminist influences, focused too much on ending social and economic injustice and not enough on stopping abortion, and permitted speakers who questioned church doctrine. In April 2015 the investigation was brought to a close. While the timing of the closure may have anticipated a visit by Francis to the US in September 2015, it was noted that the sisters' emphasis is close to that of Francis.

=== Synodal church ===
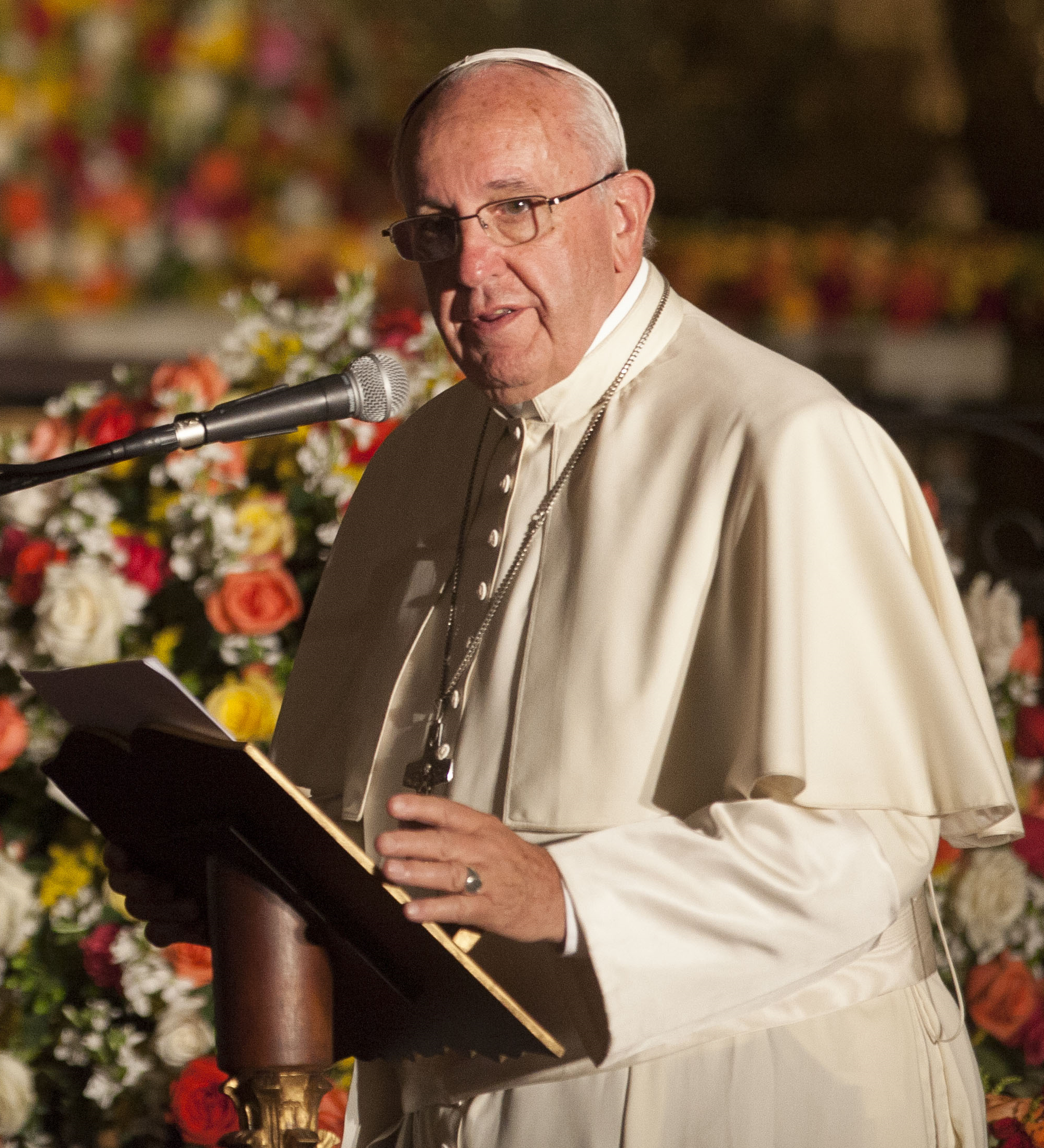
Francis in Quito, Ecuador, 2015

Francis oversaw synods on the family (2014), on youth (2018), and on the church in the Amazon region (2019). In 2019 Francis's apostolic constitution Episcopalis communio allowed that the final document of a synod may become magisterial teaching simply with papal approval. The constitution also allowed for laity to contribute input directly to the synod's secretary general. Some analysts see the creation of a truly synodal church as likely to become the greatest contribution to Francis's papacy.

On 4 October 2023, Francis convened the beginnings of the Synod on Synodality, described by some as the culmination of his papacy and one of the most important events in the Church since the Second Vatican Council.

=== Institute for the Works of Religion ===
In the first months of Francis's papacy, the Institute for the Works of Religion, informally known as the Vatican Bank, said that it would become more transparent in its financial dealings. There had long been allegations of corruption and money laundering connected with the bank. Francis appointed a commission to advise him about reform of the Bank, and the finance consulting firm Promontory Financial Group was assigned to carry out a comprehensive investigation of all customer contacts. In January 2014, Francis replaced four of the five cardinal overseers of the Vatican Bank who had been confirmed in their positions in the final days of Benedict XVI's papacy. Lay experts and clerics were looking into how the bank was run. Ernst von Freyberg was put in charge. Moneyval felt more reform was needed, and Francis showed some willingness to close the bank if the reforms proved too difficult. There was uncertainty about how far reforms could succeed.

=== Writings ===
Pope Francis wrote a variety of books, encyclicals, and other texts, including a memoir, Hope. On 29 June 2013, Francis published the encyclical Lumen fidei, which was largely the work of Benedict XVI but awaited a final draft at his retirement. On 24 November 2013, Francis published his first major letter as pope, the apostolic exhortation Evangelii gaudium, which he described as the programmatic of his papacy. On 18 June 2015, he published his first own encyclical Laudato si' concerning care for the planet. On 8 April 2016, Francis published his second apostolic exhortation, Amoris laetitia, remarking on love within the family. Controversy arose at the end of 2016 when four cardinals formally asked Francis for clarifications, particularly on the issue of giving communion to divorced and civilly remarried Catholics.

A further apostolic exhortation, Gaudete et exsultate (Rejoice and be glad), was published on 19 March 2018, dealing with "the call to holiness" for all persons. He counters contemporary versions of the gnostic and Pelagian heresies and describes how Jesus's beatitudes call people to "go against the flow".

In February 2019, Francis acknowledged that priests and bishops were sexually abusing religious sisters. He addressed this and the clergy sex abuse scandal by convening a summit on clergy sexual abuse in February 2019. As a follow-up to that summit, on 9 May 2019 Francis promulgated the motu proprio Vos estis lux mundi which specified responsibilities, including reporting directly to the Holy See on bishops and on one's superior, while simultaneously involving another bishop in the archdiocese of the accused bishop.

On 4 October 2020, Francis published the encyclical Fratelli tutti on fraternity and social friendship.

On 8 December 2020, on the Feast of the Immaculate Conception, Pope Francis published the apostolic letter Patris corde ("With a Father's Heart"). To mark the occasion, the Pope proclaimed a "Year of Saint Joseph" from 8 December 2020 to 8 December 2021 on the 150th Anniversary of the Proclamation of Saint Joseph as Patron of the Universal Church.

On 1 June 2021, Francis published the apostolic constitution Pascite gregem Dei. The document reformed Vatican penal law by strengthening the penalties for sexual abuse and financial crimes; it also more harshly punished the ordination of women.

=== Ecumenism and interreligious dialogue ===
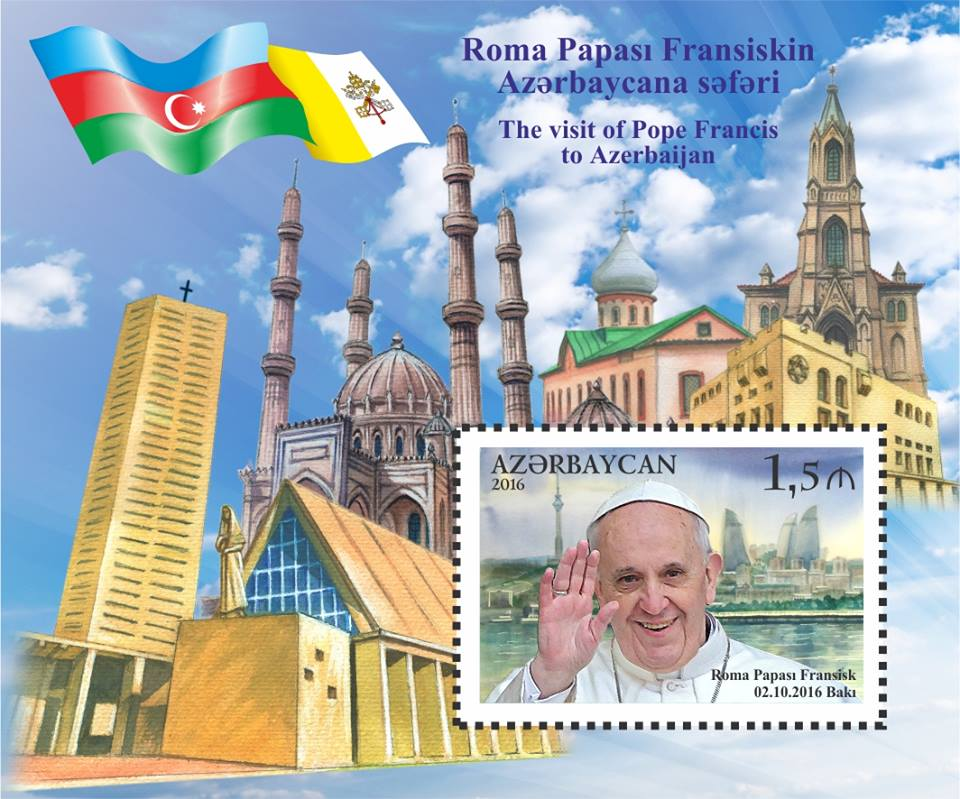
1.5 Azerbaijani manat postage stamp commemorating the pastoral visit of Francis to Azerbaijan on 2 October 2016.

Pope Francis upheld the Second Vatican Council's tradition by promoting ecumenism with other Christian denominations, encouraging dialogue with other religions, and supporting peace with secular individuals.

=== Clerical titles ===
In January 2014, Francis said that he would appoint fewer monsignors and only assign those honored to the lowest of the three surviving ranks of monsignor, chaplain of His Holiness; it would be awarded only to diocesan priests at least 65 years old. As archbishop of Buenos Aires, Francis never sought the title for any of his priests. It is believed he associated it with clerical careerism and hierarchy, although he did not apply this restriction to clergy working in the Roman Curia or diplomatic corps where careerism was an even greater concern.

=== Canonizations, beatifications and doctors of the church ===
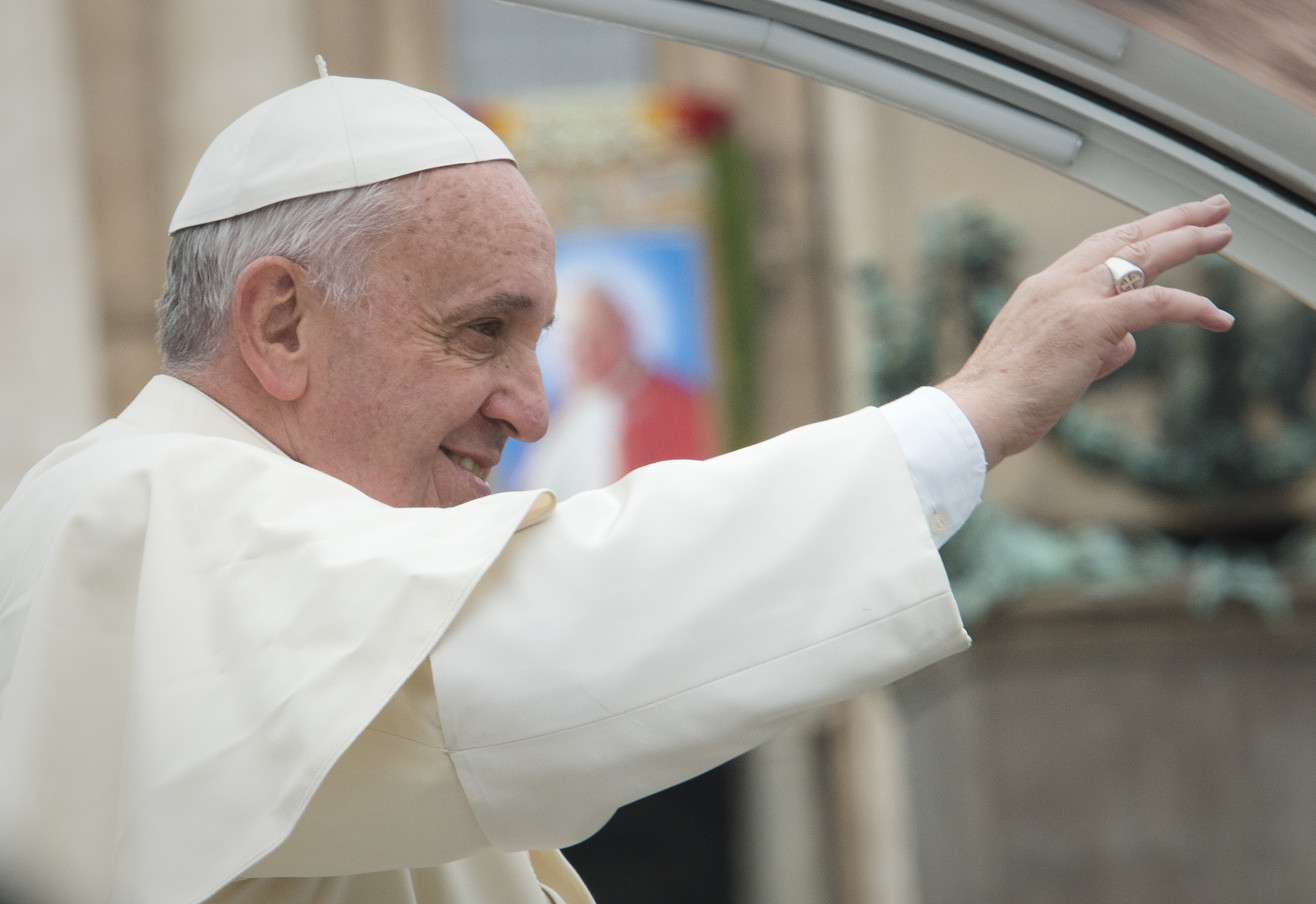
Francis on the occasion of the canonization of John XXIII and John Paul II

Francis presided over the first canonizations of his pontificate on 12 May 2013 in which he canonized the Martyrs of Otranto—Antonio Primaldo and his 812 companions who had been executed by the Ottomans in 1480—as well as the religious sisters Laura of St. Catherine of Siena and María Guadalupe García Zavala. In this first canonization, Francis surpassed the record of Pope John Paul II in canonizing the most saints in a pontificate.

Saints the Pope canonized include Louis Martin and Marie-Azélie Guérin (the first married couple to be named as saints together), Mother Teresa, and Óscar Romero. Francis canonized three of his predecessors: John XXIII, John Paul II and Paul VI. Francis also confirmed Pope John Paul I to be Venerable and Blessed.

Francis declared two new Doctors of the Church: Saint Gregory of Narek in 2015, and Saint Irenaeus of Lyon in 2022.

=== Consistories ===
Francis created 163 cardinals from 76 countries across ten consistories. He held his first consistory in February 2014, a rare occasion in which he publicly appeared with his predecessor, Benedict XVI. After the 2024 consistory, 110 cardinals appointed by Francis were under the age of 80 and thus eligible to vote at a papal conclave. There were, at that point, 110 cardinal-electors created by Francis, 24 created by Benedict XVI, and six created by John Paul II.

Francis's appointments made the College of Cardinals less European-dominated. He appointed many cardinals from developing countries, including some of the world's poorest, and from countries on the peripheries of the church.

Compared to his predecessors, Francis made fewer appointments of Roman Curia officials to the cardinalate. This was part of a general trend under Francis to a more decentralized church. Compared to his predecessor Benedict, who preferred to appoint academically inclined churchmen as cardinal, Francis favored cardinals with a more pastoral focus, especially those known for a focus on the poor and marginalized. Francis also dropped the traditional custom of always appointing the archbishops of certain historically prominent sees (such as the Patriarch of Venice and Archbishop of Milan) as cardinals.

=== Year of Mercy ===
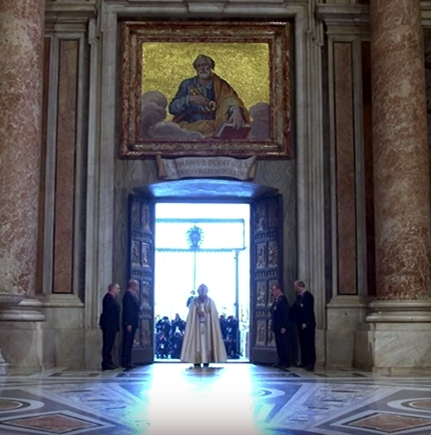
Francis opens the Holy Door, marking the beginning of the Extraordinary Jubilee of Mercy

In his April 2015 papal bull of indiction, Misericordiae Vultus (The Face of Mercy), Francis inaugurated a Special Jubilee Year of Mercy to run from 8 December 2015, Solemnity of the Immaculate Conception of the Blessed Virgin Mary, to the last Sunday before Advent and the Solemnity of the Feast of Christ the King of the Universe on 20 November 2016.

The Holy Doors of the major basilicas of Rome were opened, and special "Doors of Mercy" were opened at cathedrals and other major churches around the world, where the faithful could earn indulgences by fulfilling the usual conditions of prayer for the pope's intentions, confession, and detachment from sin, and communion. During Lent of that year, special 24-hour penance services were celebrated, and during the year, special qualified and experienced priests called "Missionaries of Mercy" were available in every diocese to forgive even severe, special-case sins normally reserved to the Holy See's Apostolic Penitentiary.

Francis established the World Day of the Poor in his Apostolic letter, Misericordia et Misera, issued on 20 November 2016 to celebrate the end of the Extraordinary Jubilee of Mercy.

=== COVID-19 pandemic ===
During the COVID-19 pandemic, Francis canceled his regular general audiences at St. Peter's Square to keep crowds from gathering and spreading the virus, which had seriously affected Italy. He encouraged priests to visit patients and health workers; urged the faithful not to forget the poor during the time of crisis; offered prayers for people with the virus in China; and invoked the Blessed Virgin Mary under her title Salus Populi Romani, as the Diocese of Rome observed a period of prayer and fasting in recognition of the victims. The pontiff reacted with displeasure on 13 March 2020 to the news that the Vicar General had closed all churches in the Diocese of Rome. Despite Italy being under a quarantine lockdown, Francis pleaded "not to leave the ... people alone" and worked to partially reverse the closures.

On 20 March 2020, Francis asked the Dicastery for Promoting Integral Human Development (DPIHD) to create a Vatican COVID-19 Commission to listen to concerns and develop responses for the future. On 27 March, Francis gave an extraordinary benediction Urbi et Orbi. In his homily on calming the storm in the Gospel of Mark, Francis described the setting:

Dense darkness has thickened on our squares, streets and cities; it looks over our lives filling everything with a deafening silence and a desolate void that paralyzes everything in its passage: you can feel it in the air, you can feel it in your gestures. ...In the face of suffering, where the true development of our peoples is measured, we discover and experience the priestly prayer of Jesus: 'may all be one'.

Francis maintained that getting COVID-19 vaccination was a moral obligation. In response to the economic harm caused by the COVID-19 pandemic, Francis said that it was the time to consider implementing a universal basic wage.

=== Death penalty ===
Francis committed the Catholic Church to support worldwide abolition of the death penalty. In 2018, Francis revised the Catechism of the Catholic Church to read that "in the light of the Gospel" the death penalty is "inadmissible because it is an attack on the inviolability and dignity of the person" and that the Catholic Church "works with determination for its abolition worldwide". In his 2020 encyclical Fratelli tutti, Francis repeated that the death penalty was "inadmissible", and that "there can be no stepping back from this position."

On 9 January 2022, Francis stated in his annual speech to Vatican ambassadors: "The death penalty cannot be employed for a purported state justice, since it does not constitute a deterrent nor render justice to victims, but only fuels the thirst for vengeance."

=== Role of women ===
Francis categorically rejected the ordination of women as priests. Early in his papacy, he initiated dialogue on the possibility of deaconesses, creating in 2016 a Study Commission on the Women's Diaconate to research the role of female deacons in early Christianity. Its report was not made public, but Francis said in 2019 that the commission was unable to come to a consensus. In April 2020, Francis empaneled a new commission, led by Cardinal Giuseppe Petrocchi with a new membership, to study the issue. Francis delayed a decision on the issue for several years. In interviews in late 2023 and 2024, he appeared to reject the idea of women deacons, saying that "holy orders is reserved for men." Francis said that "the fact that the woman does not access ministerial life is not a deprivation, because her place is much more important" and that women had a charism separate from "the ministerial way."

In January 2021, Francis issued Spiritus Domini, allowing bishops to institute women to the ministries of acolyte and lector. While these instituted ministries were previously reserved to men, Catholic women already carried out these duties without institution in most of the world. Francis wrote that these ministries are fundamentally distinct from those reserved to ordained clergy. The following month, Francis appointed women to several positions previously held only by men: a French member of the Xaviere Missionary Sisters, Nathalie Becquart, was appointed co-undersecretary of the Synod of Bishops, and Italian magistrate Catia Summaria became the first woman Promoter of Justice in the Vatican's Court of Appeals.

In April 2023, Francis announced that 35 women would be allowed to vote at the Sixteenth Ordinary General Assembly of the Synod of Bishops ("just over 10%" of all voters), marking the first time women are allowed to vote at any Catholic Synod of Bishops.

=== Financial corruption ===
Francis was mandated by electing cardinals to sort out Vatican finances following scandals during the papacies of Pope Benedict and Pope John Paul II. He stated he was determined to end corruption in the Catholic Church but was not very optimistic due to it being a human problem dating back centuries.

=== Apologies toward Indigenous peoples ===
Early in 2022, Francis expressed "shame and sorrow" for the Catholic Church's role in abuses against the Indigenous peoples in Canada. Later, in July 2022, Francis made an apostolic journey to Canada, where he expressed sorrow, indignation, and shame over the church's abuse of Canadian Indigenous children in residential schools. Francis described the Canadian Catholic Church's role as a "cultural genocide". He apologized for the church's role in "projects of cultural destruction" and forced assimilation. Near the former Ermineskin Indian Residential School, the site of a search for unmarked graves, Francis said: "I humbly beg forgiveness for the evil committed by so many Christians against the Indigenous peoples." He visited the Ermineskin Cree Nation's cemetery at its Maskwacis reserve. Francis promised a serious investigation into the history of abuse.

=== Sexual abuse response ===
In 2010, then-Cardinal Bergoglio commissioned a study which concluded that Father Julio César Grassi, a priest convicted of child sexual abuse, was innocent, that his victims were lying, and that the case against him never should have gone to trial. However, the Supreme Court of Argentina upheld the conviction and prison sentence against Grassi in March 2017.

Early in his papacy, Francis chose a more lenient sentence for Mauro Inzoli, an Italian priest accused of child sexual abuse. A church tribunal had ruled that Inzoli should be laicized (defrocked), and he was defrocked in 2012 by Francis's predecessor Benedict. Francis, however, reversed this decision in 2014; Francis agreed with the bishop of Crema that Inzoli should remain a priest but be removed from public ministry and ordered to retire to "a life of prayer and humble discretion." Inzoli was convicted of sexually abusing children in Italian civil court in 2016, and sentenced to prison. In unscripted remarks to the Pontifical Commission for the Protection of Minors in September 2017, Francis admitted that he mishandled the Inzoli case, saying that as a new pope, "I did not understand these things well and chose the more benevolent of the two sentences but after two years the priest had a relapse. I learned from this." In the same remarks, he commented that the church "arrived late" in dealing with sexual abuse cases.

In 2015, Francis was criticized for supporting Chilean bishop Juan Barros who was accused of covering up Catholic Church sexual abuse cases in Chile, including crimes committed against minors. In 2018, Francis acknowledged he had made "grave errors" in judgment about Barros, apologized to the victims and launched a Vatican investigation that resulted in the resignation of three Chilean bishops: Barros, Gonzalo Duarte, and Cristián Caro.

In 2019, Francis defrocked Theodore McCarrick, a former archbishop of Washington, who maintained a prominent position in the church for decades despite repeated reports of sexual misconduct against him dating back to the 1980s. In 2017, after renewed allegations against McCarrick, Francis commissioned a Vatican investigation, which found that McCarrick had sexually molested both adults and minors. In July 2018, McCarrick resigned from the College of Cardinals; in October 2018, Francis ordered a review of the Church's "institutional knowledge and decision-making" related to McCarrick. Francis authorized the release, in November 2020, of the report of the Vatican's two-year investigation into McCarrick's career. The report largely faulted Pope John Paul II, who appointed McCarrick as archbishop in 2000 and accepted the churchman's denials of sexual abuse, despite multiple reports. The report also found that Pope Benedict XVI placed informal restrictions on McCarrick, but these were never enforced, and Benedict did not investigate or formally sanction McCarrick even after he disregarded those restrictions. The report concluded that Francis, before 2017, "had heard only that there had been allegations and rumors related to immoral conduct with adults occurring prior to McCarrick's appointment to Washington" and continued the approach of his predecessors John Paul and Benedict.

Francis convened a summit on sexual abuse in February 2019, organized by Hans Zollner; some abuse survivors expressed disappointment that the summit did not result in concrete rules on abuse prevention, responses to abuse, and Church cooperation with law enforcement authorities. In December 2019, Francis abolished the "pontifical secrecy" privilege in sexual abuse cases, clarifying that bishops do not need authorization from the Vatican to turn over materials from canonical trials upon request of civil law enforcement authorities. The lifting of the confidentiality rule was praised by victim advocates, but did not require the Church to affirmatively turn over canonical documents to civil authorities.

In November 2021, Francis thanked journalists for their work in uncovering child sexual abuse scandals in the church. He also thanked journalists for "helping us not to sweep it under the carpet, and for the voice you have given to the abuse victims".

In November 2022, French Cardinal Jean-Pierre Ricard admitted to having sexually abused a 14-year-old girl in the 1980s in Marseille. French authorities opened an investigation into the case while Francis commented that now that "everything is clearer [...] more cases like this shouldn't surprise [anyone]", and condemned sexual abuse as "against priestly nature, and also against social nature". Francis did not deprive Ricard of his status and privileges as a cardinal.

Francis visited Ireland in 2018, marking the first papal tour of the country since John Paul II's historic trip in 1979. He has apologized for sexual abuses by clergy in the United States and Ireland.

The case of Slovenian priest Marko Rupnik, accused of psychological, spiritual, and sexual abuse against multiple women, including nuns, drew significant controversy due to the Vatican's handling of the allegations. Initially, the Dicastery for the Doctrine of the Faith (DDF) declined to prosecute, citing the statute of limitations, despite acknowledging there was a case to answer. Rupnik was expelled from the Society of Jesus in 2023 for disobedience rather than for the abuse allegations and was later incardinated into the Diocese of Koper. Following widespread public outcry, Pope Francis ordered the case to be reopened and re-examined. After his conviction, Rupnik preached in 2020 a Lenten meditation for priests working in the Roman Curia, including Pope Francis and Luis Ladaria Ferrer, and met privately with Pope Francis in January 2022. Criticism intensified after it was revealed that artwork by Rupnik remains in use by the Vatican, including in Pope Francis's personal residence, despite calls from Cardinal Seán Patrick O'Malley, head of the Pontifical Commission for the Protection of Minors, for its removal. The controversy fueled broader scrutiny of the Vatican's response to clergy abuse cases and its commitment to transparency and justice. In January 2025, Cardinal Víctor Manuel Fernández confirmed the DDF was working to establish an independent tribunal to move forward with judicial proceedings.

== Theological emphases and teachings ==
In Evangelii gaudium, Francis revealed what would be the emphases of his pontificate: a missionary impulse among all Catholics, sharing the faith more actively, avoiding worldliness by more visibly living the gospel of God's mercy, and helping the poor and working for social justice.

Since 2016, criticism against Francis by theological conservatives has intensified. (Note: Attributed to multiple sources: One commentator had described the conservative resistance against Francis as "unique in its visibility" in recent church history.) Some have explained the level of disagreement as due to his going beyond theoretical principles to pastoral discernment.

=== Evangelization ===
From his first major letter Evangelii gaudium (Joy to the World), Francis called for "a missionary and pastoral conversion" whereby the laity would fully share in the missionary task of the church. Then, in his letter on the call of all to the same holiness, Gaudete et exsultate, Francis describes holiness as "an impulse to evangelize and to leave a mark in this world".

=== Church governance ===
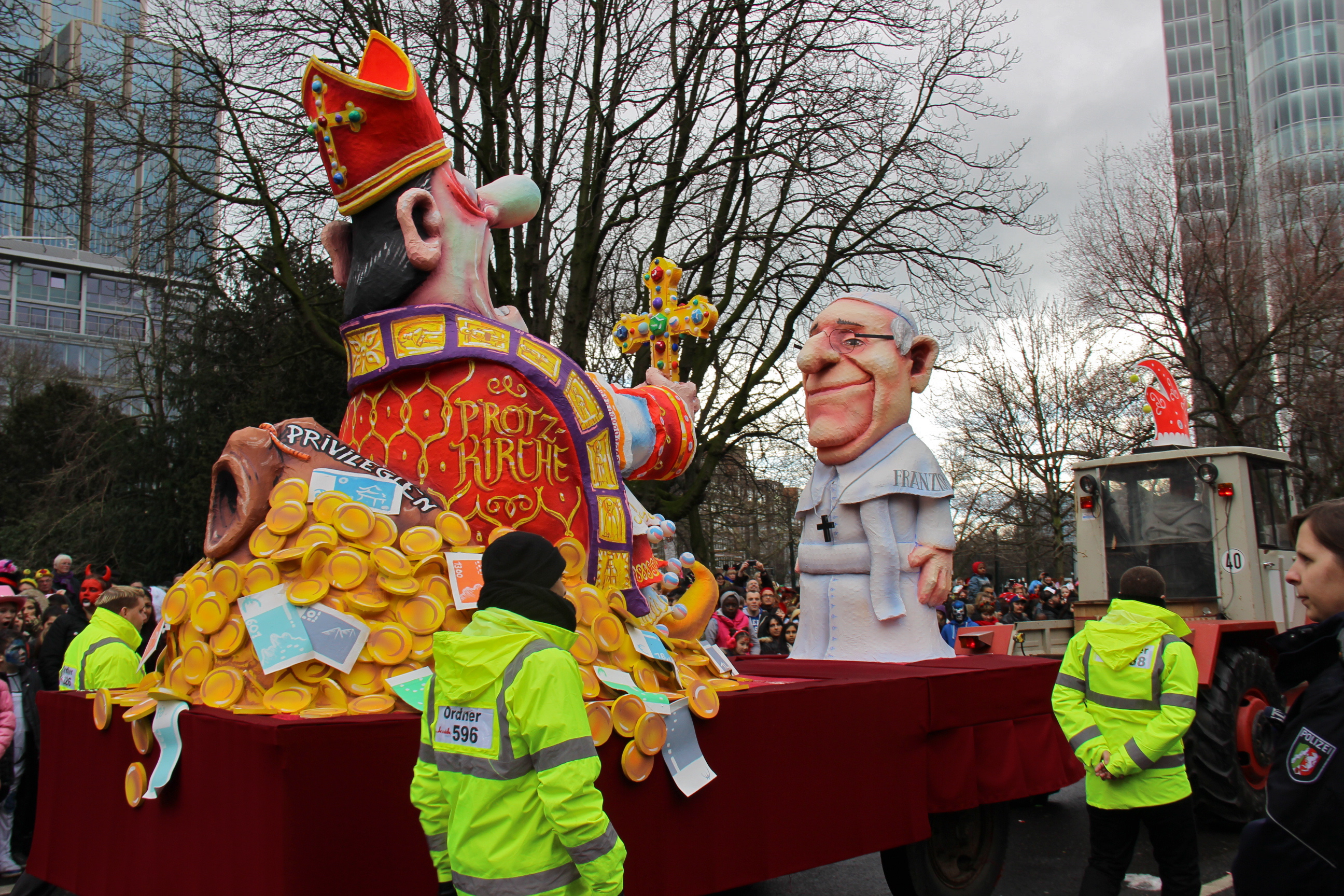
A Carnival float of Francis and Germany's prelate Franz-Peter Tebartz-van Elst, Düsseldorf, 2014

Francis called for decentralization of governance away from Rome and for a synodal manner of decision-making in dialogue with the people. He strongly opposed clericalism and made women full members of the church's dicasteries in Rome.

=== Environment and climate change ===
Francis's naming was an early indication of how he shared Francis of Assisi's care for all of creation. This was followed in May 2015 with his major encyclical on the environment, Laudato si' (Praise be to you). In October 2023, in advance of the 2023 United Nations Climate Change Conference (COP28), Francis issued the apostolic exhortation Laudate Deum (Praise God), in which he called for decisive action to against the climate crisis and condemned climate change denial.

At the 2017 World Food Day ceremony, Francis highlighted the daily impacts of climate change and the solutions provided by scientific knowledge. He pointed out that while the international community had established legal frameworks such as the Paris Agreement, some nations had been withdrawing. He then expressed concern over a renewed indifference to ecosystem balance, the belief in controlling limited resources, and a greed for profit. In 2019, he stated that ecocide was a sin and should be made "a fifth category of crimes against peace".

In May 2024, Francis organized a climate summit that issued a Planetary Protocol for Climate Change Resilience including three pillars: greenhouse gas emissions reduction (while prioritizing nature-based solutions), climate change adaptation, and societal transformation. The next month, Francis issued an apostolic letter titled Fratello sole (Brother sun, referring to Saint Francis' Canticle of the Sun), ordering the Vatican to construct an agrivoltaics facility on its land holdings on the outskirts of Rome, as a gesture of the Church towards the environmental movement.

=== Option for the poor ===
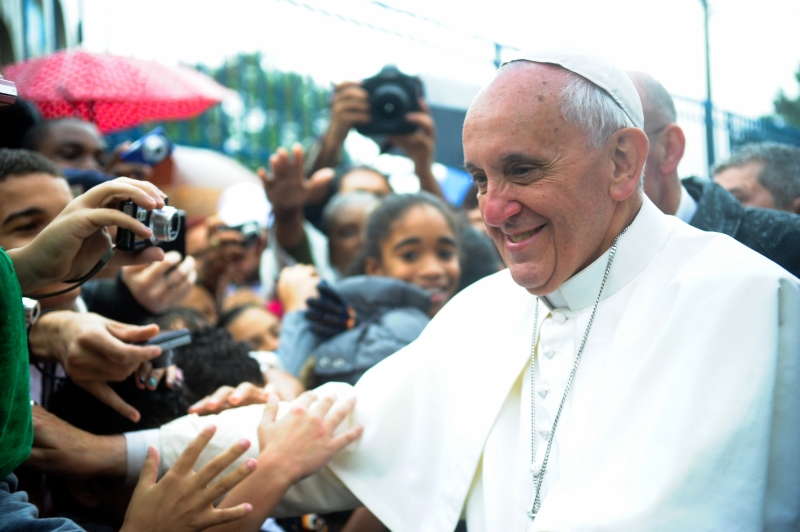
Francis visits a favela in Brazil during World Youth Day 2013

Francis had highly extolled "popular movements" which demonstrate the "strength of us", serve as a remedy to the "culture of the self", and are based on solidarity with the poor and the common good. He had praised liberation theology founder Gustavo Gutierrez. In 2024, he met with representatives of the Dialop group, a discussion group between Christians and Marxists, and encouraged them to cooperate.

In September 2024, Francis renewed calls for a universal basic income, as well as higher taxes on billionaires.

=== Morality ===
Cardinal Walter Kasper had called mercy "the key word of his pontificate". His papal motto Miserando atque eligendo ("by having mercy and by choosing") contains a central theme of his papacy, God's mercy. While maintaining the Catholic Church's traditional teaching against abortion, Francis had referred to the "obsession" of some Catholics with a few issues such as "abortion, gay marriage and the use of contraceptive methods" which "do not show the heart of the message of Jesus Christ".

=== LGBTQ ===
While serving as the archbishop of Buenos Aires, Bergoglio led public opposition to the parliamentary bill on legalizing same-sex marriage in Argentina, which was eventually approved by the Argentine Senate in 2010. A letter he wrote in that campaign was criticized for using "medieval" and "obscurantist" language. A church source quoted in the Argentine newspaper La Nación called the letter a strategic error that contributed to the bill's success.

As Pope, Francis marked a more accommodative tone on some LGBTQ topics than his predecessors. In July 2013, his televised "Who am I to judge?" statement was widely reported in the international press, becoming one of his most famous statements on LGBTQ people. In other public statements, Francis emphasized the need to accept, welcome, and accompany LGBTQ people, including LGBTQ children. Francis reiterated traditional Catholic teaching that marriage is between a man and a woman, but supported civil unions as legal protections for same-sex couples. Under his pontificate, the Dicastery for the Doctrine of the Faith confirmed that transgender people can be baptised. The blessing of individuals in same-sex relationships was allowed by the document Fiducia supplicans. Francis privately met with many LGBTQ people and activists. In 2013, Francis was named Person of the Year by The Advocate, an American LGBTQ magazine.

In September 2015, Francis met with Kim Davis, a county clerk who was jailed for six days for contempt of court for refusing to issue marriage licenses for same-sex couples. In August 2018, Francis was criticized for suggesting that gay children seek psychiatric treatment, but he then rescinded the statement. He described gender theory and children's education on gender-affirming surgery as "ideological colonization". He also criticized "gender ideology", yet said that the 1907 novel Lord of the World depicted what he was intending to criticize. He further wrote:

Gender ideology is something other than homosexual or transsexual people. Gender ideology makes everyone equal without respect for personal history. I understand the concern about that paragraph in Dignitas Infinita, but it refers not to transgender people but to gender ideology, which nullifies differences. Transgender people must be accepted and integrated into society.

In a January 2023 interview with the Associated Press, Francis denounced the criminalization of homosexuality (which he called "unjust"); he also called on the Catholic Church to "distinguish between a sin and crime" and asked bishops supporting such laws to reverse their position. Francis repeated this stance the following month.

=== International policy ===
Francis had regularly been accused by conservatives of having a "soft spot" for leftist populist movements.

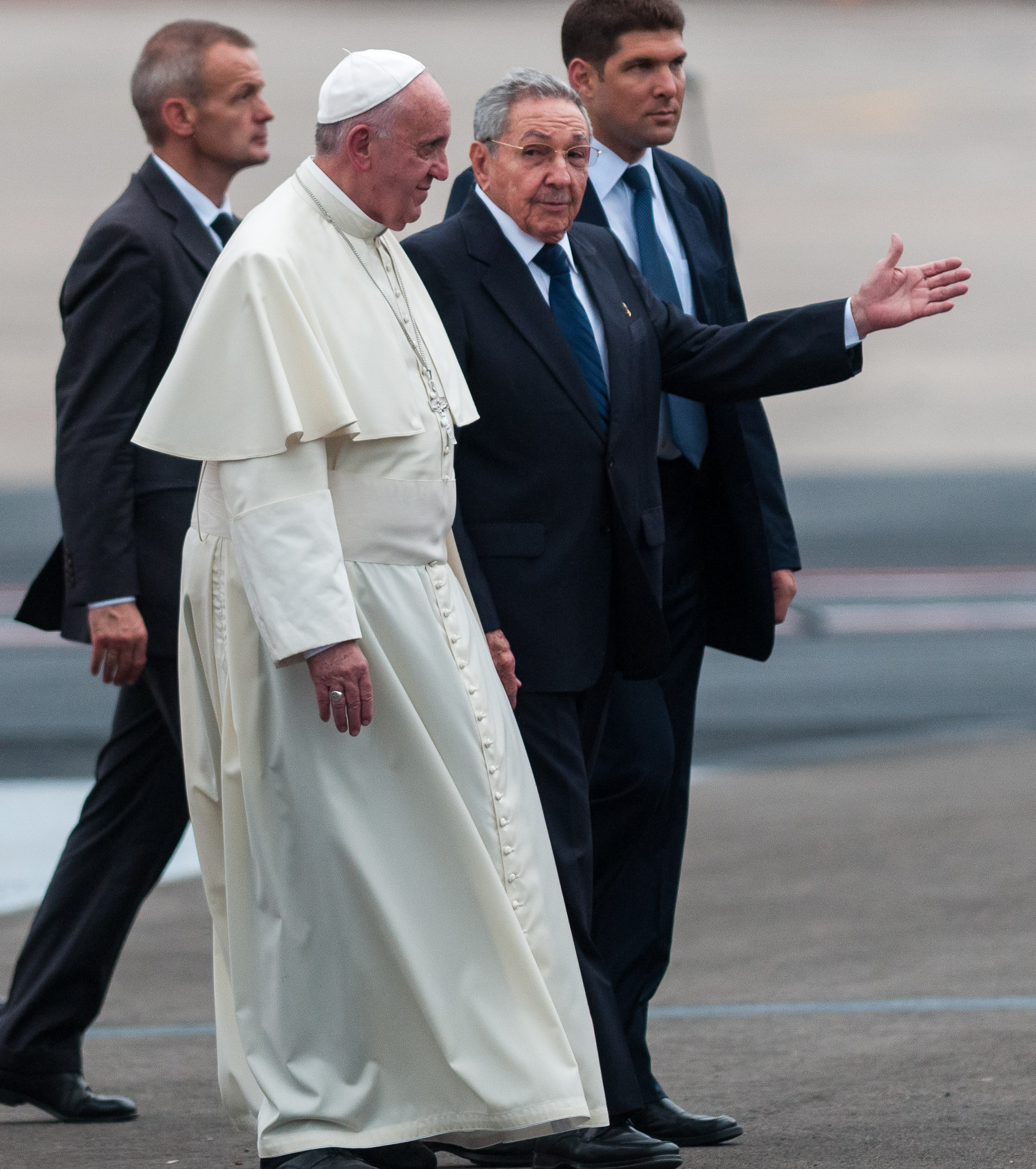
Francis with Raúl Castro, 2015

After Francis's visit to Cuba in 2015, Catholic Yale historian Carlos Eire said Francis had a "preferential option for the oppressors" in Cuba. Francis had expressed criticism towards right-wing populism. Since 2016, Francis had been contrasted with US president Donald Trump, with some conservative critics drawing comparisons between the two. During the 2016 United States presidential election, Francis said of Trump, "A person who only thinks about building walls, wherever they may be, and not building bridges, is not Christian." Trump responded, "For a religious leader to question a person's faith is disgraceful."

In response to criticism from Venezuela's bishops, President Nicolás Maduro said in 2017 that he had the support of Francis. Francis met with the country's bishops in June 2017, and the Venezuelan bishops' conference president stated, "There is no distance between the episcopal conference and the Holy See." In January 2019, 20 former presidents in Latin America wrote a letter to Francis criticizing his Christmas address regarding the ongoing Venezuelan crisis for being too simplistic and for not acknowledging what they believed to be the causes of the suffering of the victims of the crisis. Francis had sought peace in the crisis without picking a side.

==== Position toward China ====
Francis took a more conciliatory approach toward the People's Republic of China than any previous pope. He continued the Vatican's longstanding diplomatic recognition of the Republic of China (Taiwan), rather than the People's Republic of China; Vatican City is one of just 12 countries to formally recognize Taiwan. In 2018, however, Francis approved a provisional Vatican–China agreement intended to normalize the situation of China's Catholics who numbered approximately 10 million as of 2024. Before, the Chinese government claimed the authority to appoint bishops, without papal approval, through the state-controlled Chinese Catholic Patriotic Association, in contravention of longstanding church doctrine. Under the 2018 agreement, the Vatican consults with the Chinese government on the appointment of bishops and pledged not to appoint any bishop in China without Beijing's approval; in return, the Chinese government recognized the pope as the supreme head of the Catholic Church. The agreement was renewed for two years in 2020.

Francis's efforts toward rapprochement with China were highly controversial; a leading critic, Cardinal Joseph Zen, said the 2018 agreement was a step toward the "annihilation" of the Catholic Church in China. Critics said that the 2018 agreement "sold out" Chinese Catholics by accepting infringements on religious freedom, undermining the Vatican's spiritual authority.

The Chinese government repeatedly violated the 2018 deal with the Vatican. Francis had defended the Vatican's dialogue with China on the appointment of new bishops, saying in 2021 that uneasy dialogue was better than no dialogue at all. From the signing of the agreement until 2022, only six Catholic bishops in China were appointed. In November 2022, the Vatican publicly accused China of violating the agreement by installing John Peng Weizhao as an auxiliary bishop without Vatican approval. In April 2023, the Chinese government also installed Joseph Shen Bin as bishop of Shanghai without Vatican approval. Three months later, Francis recognized Shen Bin's appointment; the Vatican secretary of state, Pietro Parolin, said that the pope wanted to "remedy the canonical irregularity created in Shanghai, in view of the greater good of the diocese and the fruitful exercise of the bishop's pastoral ministry." The Vatican and the Chinese government renewed the agreement in 2022 and again in 2024.

In November 2020, Francis named China's Uyghur minority among a list of the world's persecuted peoples. He wrote: "I think often of persecuted peoples: the Rohingya [Muslims in Myanmar], the poor Uighurs, the Yazidi—what ISIS did to them was truly cruel—or Christians in Egypt and Pakistan killed by bombs that went off while they prayed in church." Zhao Lijian, the spokesman of the Foreign Ministry of China, said Francis's remarks had "no factual basis".

In 2019, during the Hong Kong pro-democracy protests, Francis was criticized by Zen and other Catholic clergy in Hong Kong for failing to take a stand against China's repression and instead being quoted as saying, "I would like to go to China. I love China." Francis compared the protests in Hong Kong to those seen in Chile and in France.

=== Theological disagreements ===
==== Amoris laetitia ====
On a theological level, controversy arose after the publication of the apostolic exhortation Amoris laetitia, especially regarding whether the exhortation had changed the Catholic Church's sacramental discipline concerning access to the sacraments of Penance and the Eucharist for divorced couples who have civilly remarried. Francis had written: "It is important that the divorced who have entered a new union should be made to feel part of the Church." He called for "a responsible personal and pastoral discernment of particular cases". He went on to say: "It is true that general rules set forth a good which can never be disregarded or neglected, but in their formulation they cannot provide absolutely for all particular situations."

The exhortation had been implemented in different ways by bishops around the world. In July 2017, a group of conservative clergy, academics, and laymen signed a document labeled as a "Filial Correction" of Francis, which criticized the Pope for promoting what it described as seven heretical propositions through various words, actions, and omissions during his pontificate.

==== Document on Human Fraternity ====
The Document on Human Fraternity for World Peace and Living Together is a joint statement signed by Francis and Ahmed el-Tayeb, Grand Imam of Al-Azhar, on 4 February 2019. This statement is concerned with how different faiths can live peaceably in the same areas; it later inspired the International Day of Human Fraternity, as acknowledged by the UN Secretary-General António Guterres. Criticisms focused particularly on the passage about God's will with regard to the diversity of religions, claiming that the "pluralism and the diversity of religions, colour, sex, race and language are willed by God in His wisdom, through which He created human beings". Catholic theologian Chad Pecknold wrote that this sentence was "puzzling, and potentially problematic". Some Catholic observers tried to understand it as an allusion to the "permissive will" of God, allowing evil on earth. Pecknold wrote that the diversity of religions might also be "evidence of our natural desire to know God". Bishop Athanasius Schneider claims that Pope Francis clarified to him that he was referring to "the permissive will of God".

==== Traditionis custodes and the Tridentine Mass ====
In July 2021, Francis issued motu proprio, the apostolic letter titled Traditionis custodes, which reversed the decision of his predecessor Benedict XVI in Summorum Pontificum and imposed new restrictions on the use of the Traditional Latin Mass. The letter returned to the bishops the power to grant or ban the Latin Mass in their dioceses, and required newly ordained priests to request permission before performing the old rite, among other changes. Traditionis custodes had been criticized by prelates including cardinals Raymond Leo Burke, Gerhard Ludwig Müller, and Joseph Zen, and many lay faithful. Edwin Pentin wrote in National Catholic Register that "The most general criticism is that the restrictions are unnecessary, needlessly harsh, and implemented in an unjustifiably swift fashion."

==== Fiducia supplicans ====
In December 2023, the Dicastery for the Doctrine of the Faith issued a declaration, Fiducia supplicans, approved by Francis. Fiducia supplicans intended to provide clarification and reforms on the Catholic Church's treatment of "irregular relationships", defined as those who establish a monogamous and emotional bond that lasts over time and have not contracted a Catholic marriage. Notably, it allows Catholic priests to perform "spontaneous blessings" of same-sex couples, as well as opposite-sex couples who are not married, and civilly married couples at least one party of which was previously divorced but had not received an annulment.

Fiducia supplicans sparked considerable controversy among Catholics, including from several conservative commentators, clerical congregations, and high-profile cardinals, bishops, priests, and lay people. Cardinal Gerhard Ludwig Müller called it "sacrilegious and blasphemous" and "self-contradictory". Cardinal Robert Sarah described the blessing of couples in irregular situations as "a heresy that seriously undermines the Church". On 11 January 2024, Cardinal Fridolin Ambongo Besungu announced that all episcopal conferences in Africa, represented in SECAM, would reject blessings for same-sex couples, stating that "the extra-liturgical blessings proposed in the declaration...cannot be carried out in Africa without exposing themselves to scandals".

== International diplomatic role ==
Map indicating countries visited by Francis as pope

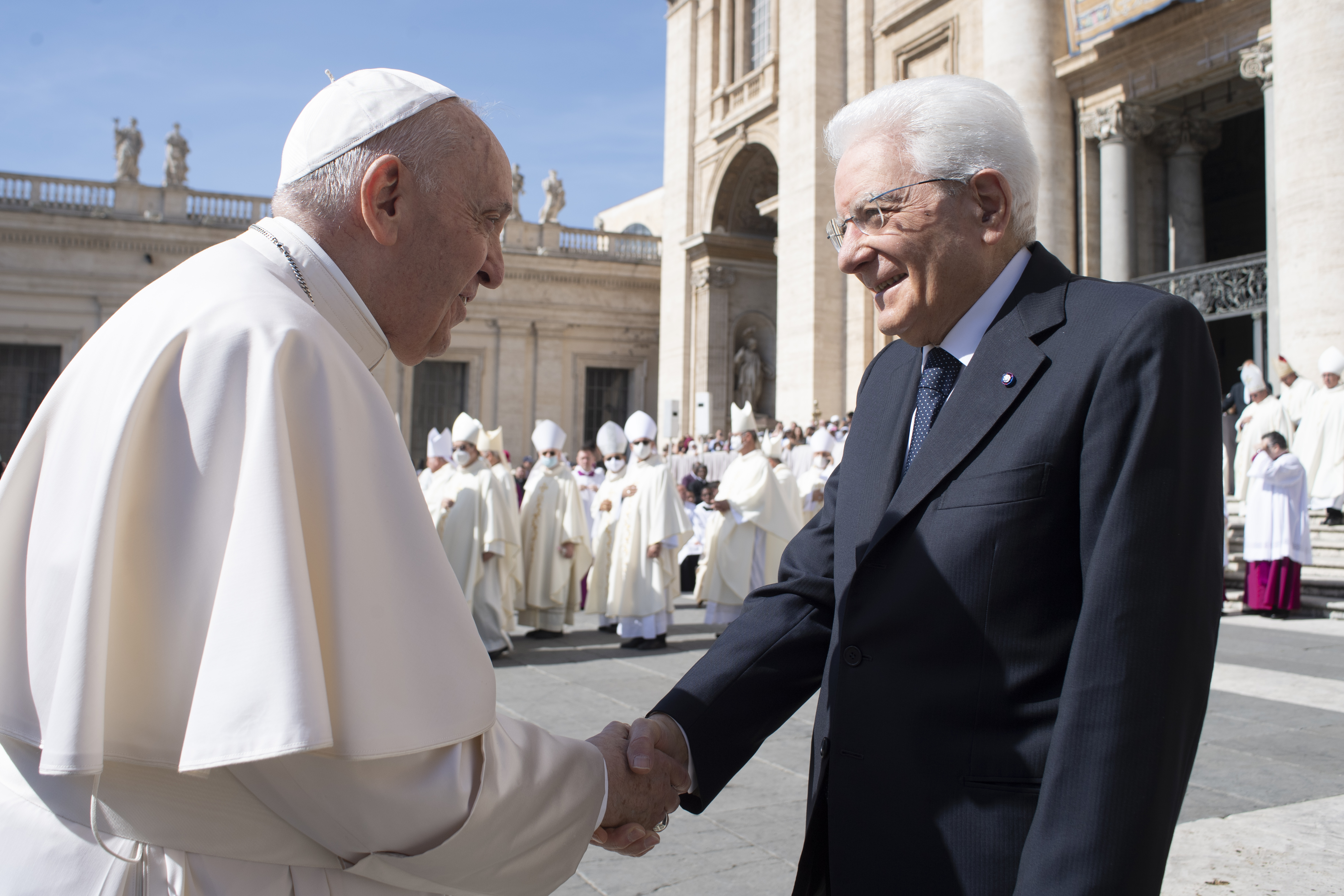
Pope Francis with Italian president Sergio Mattarella in 2022

=== Cuba ===
When Francis was archbishop of Buenos Aires, he authored a text entitled "Dialogues Between John Paul II and Fidel Castro". John Paul was the first pope to visit Cuba. After a meeting between Francis and Cuban leader Raúl Castro in May 2015, Castro said that he was considering returning to the Catholic Church. He said in a televised news conference, "I read all the speeches of the pope, his commentaries, and if the pope continues this way, I will go back to praying and go back to the [Catholic] church."

As pope, Francis played a key role in the talks toward restoring full diplomatic relations between the US and Cuba, announced on 17 December 2014. The Pope, along with the Government of Canada, was a behind-the-scenes broker of the agreement, taking the role following President Obama's request during his visit to the Pope in March 2014. The success of the negotiations was credited to Francis because "as a religious leader with the confidence of both sides, he was able to convince the Obama and Castro administrations that the other side would live up to the deal". En route to the United States for a visit in September 2015, the Pope stopped in Cuba.

=== Israeli–Palestinian conflict ===
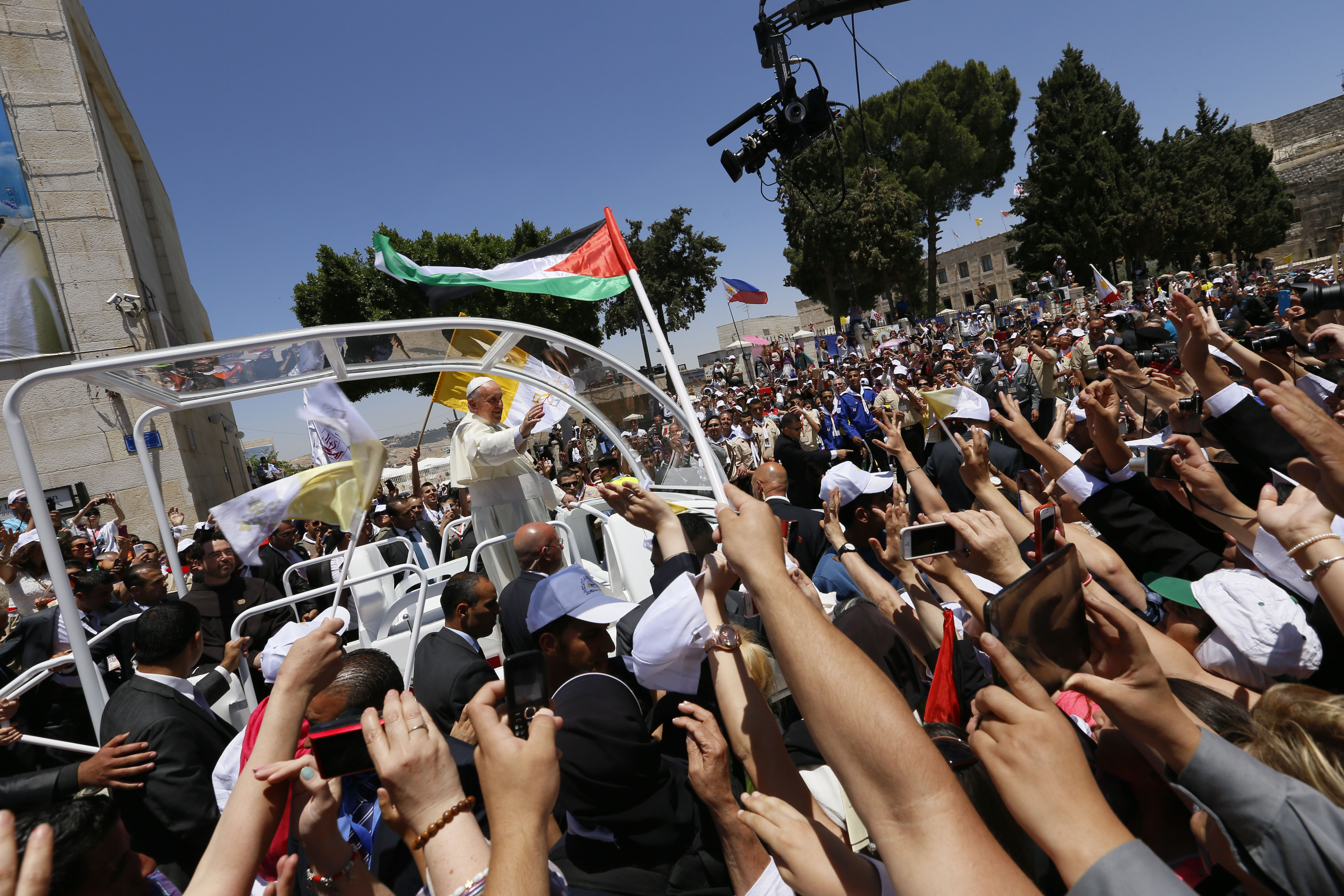
Francis in Bethlehem in May 2014

In May 2014, Francis visited Israel and the Palestinian territories. Francis offered symbolic gestures to both sides in the Israeli–Palestinian conflict. In addition to visiting the Western Wall, Yad Vashem, and the Church of the Holy Sepulchre, he became the first pope to visit the grave of Theodor Herzl, entered the West Bank from Jordan rather than Israel, and invited Palestinian Authority president Mahmoud Abbas and Israeli president Shimon Peres to a prayer summit at the Vatican—both accepted. He also visited Bethlehem, where he gave a speech alongside Abbas, and celebrated Mass at the Church of the Nativity. At the invitation of Israeli Prime Minister Benjamin Netanyahu, he visited the Victims of Acts of Terror Memorial; at the invitation of Palestinian authorities, he prayed at a portion of the Israeli West Bank barrier. In addition to meetings with Peres and Netanyahu, Francis met Grand Mufti of Jerusalem Muhammad Ahmad Hussein, Chief Rabbis Yitzhak Yosef and David Lau, and Rabbi of the Western Wall and the Holy Places Shmuel Rabinowitz.

In May 2015, Francis welcomed Abbas to the Vatican and said that: "The angel of peace destroys the evil spirit of war. I thought about you: may you be an angel of peace." The Vatican signed a treaty recognizing the state of Palestine. The Vatican issued statements concerning the hope that peace talks could resume between Israel and Palestine. Abbas's visit was on the occasion of the canonization of two Palestinian nuns.

On 13 May 2015, Vatican City announced the intention to sign its first treaty with the State of Palestine after formally recognizing it as a state in February 2013.

In May 2021, amid clashes in Jerusalem, Francis reiterated calls for peace between Israel and Palestinians during his Regina caeli address.

Francis condemned the October 7 attacks and also criticized Israel's actions in the Gaza Strip during the subsequent Gaza war, saying that "terror should not justify terror" and describing Israel's airstrikes as "cruelty, this is not war." He condemned the killing of two Palestinian Christian women by an IDF sniper in Gaza, calling it "terrorism". Throughout the war, Francis had called for an immediate ceasefire, the release of all hostages, and the implementation of a two-state solution. In November 2024, Pope Francis suggested that the international community should investigate if Israel's campaign in Gaza is a genocide of the Palestinian people. From October 2023 until the day he died, he spoke with the only Catholic church in the Gaza Strip every night. In his last public appearance he again called for a ceasefire and condemned the "deplorable humanitarian situation" in Gaza.

=== Migrant and refugee issues ===
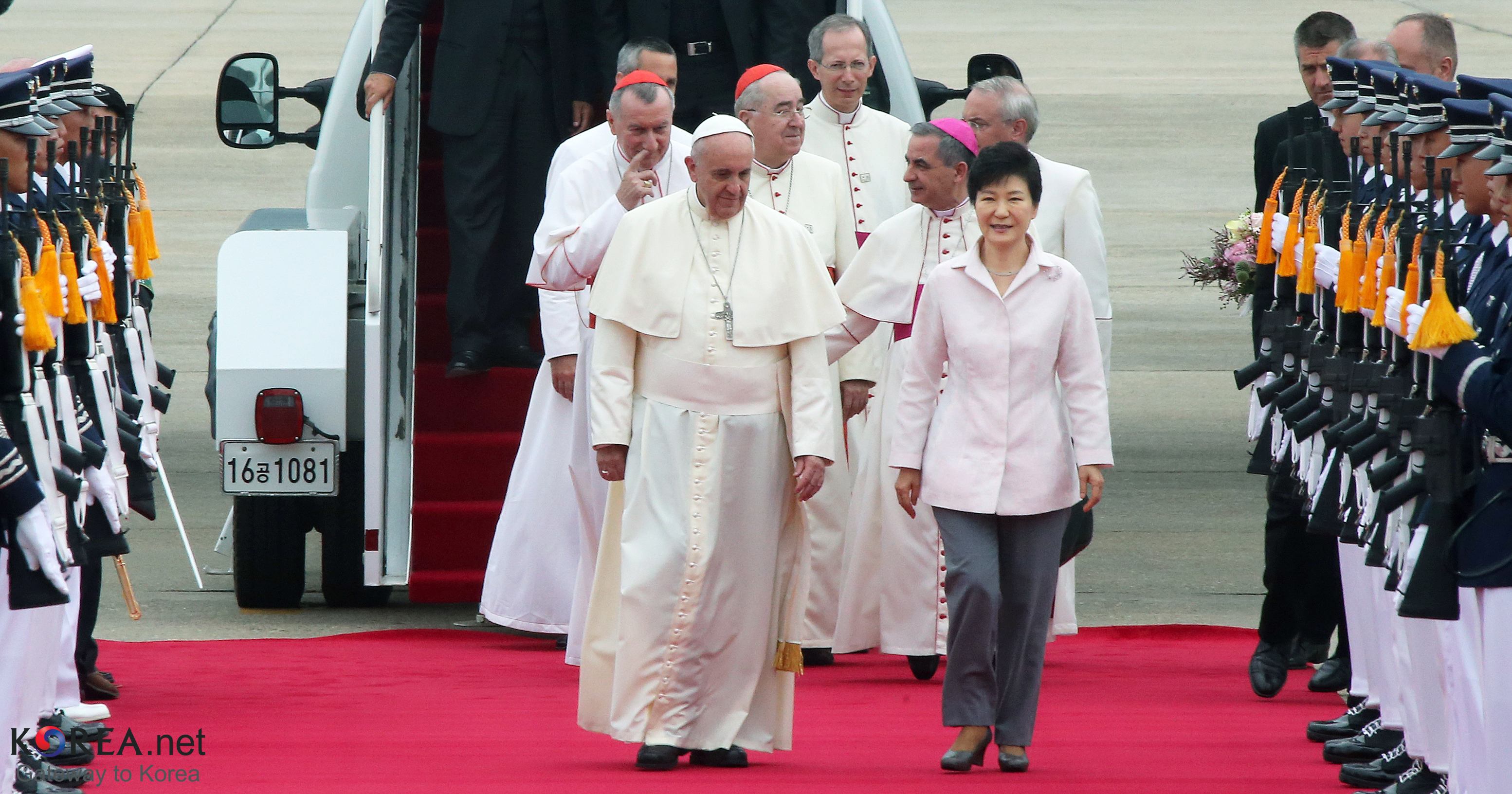
Francis with South Korean president Park Geun-hye, 14 August 2014

Francis made the plight of refugees and migrants "a core component of his pastoral work" and had defended their rights in dialogue both with Europe and with the United States. In 2019, he placed a statue in St. Peter's Square to bring attention to the Christian imperative involved in their situation (Hebrews 13:2). In line with this policy, Francis had criticized neo-nationalists and populists who reject the acceptance of refugees.

In April 2016, Francis, along with Ecumenical Patriarch Bartholomew and Archbishop Ieronimos II of Athens, visited the Moria refugee camp on the Greek island of Lesbos in order to call the attention of the world to the 2015 European migrant crisis. There, the three Christian leaders signed a joint declaration.

In February 2025, following the election to a second term of US president Donald Trump there were mass deportations and swingeing cuts to international aid by the new administration, defended by Vice President JD Vance, a Catholic, by recasting the Catholic idea of ordo amoris (the right ordering of one's love) as a justification for nativism. Francis wrote what had been described as "an extraordinary and excoriating response to US bishops". He cited the parable of the Good Samaritan, described the ordo amoris as the love that "builds a fraternity open to all, without exception" and criticized the focus on solely family, community or national identity as "[introducing] an ideological criterion that distorts social life and imposes the will of the strongest".

=== Sovereign Military Order of Malta ===
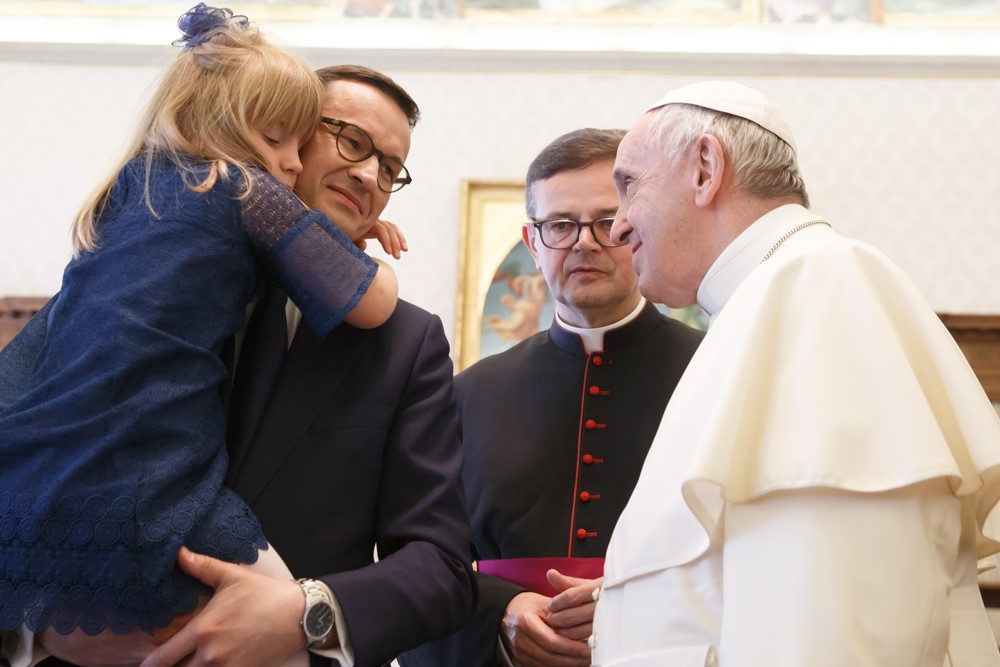
Francis with Polish prime minister Mateusz Morawiecki and his family, Vatican City, June 2018

In January 2017, Francis demanded the resignation of Matthew Festing, the 79th Prince and Grand Master of the Sovereign Military Order of Malta. The Pope's demand was a response to Festing and Cardinal Raymond Leo Burke dismissing Baron Albrecht von Boeselager from his position in the Order of Malta. Fra' Giacomo Dalla Torre del Tempio di Sanguinetto was appointed leader in May 2017.

=== Russia and Ukraine ===
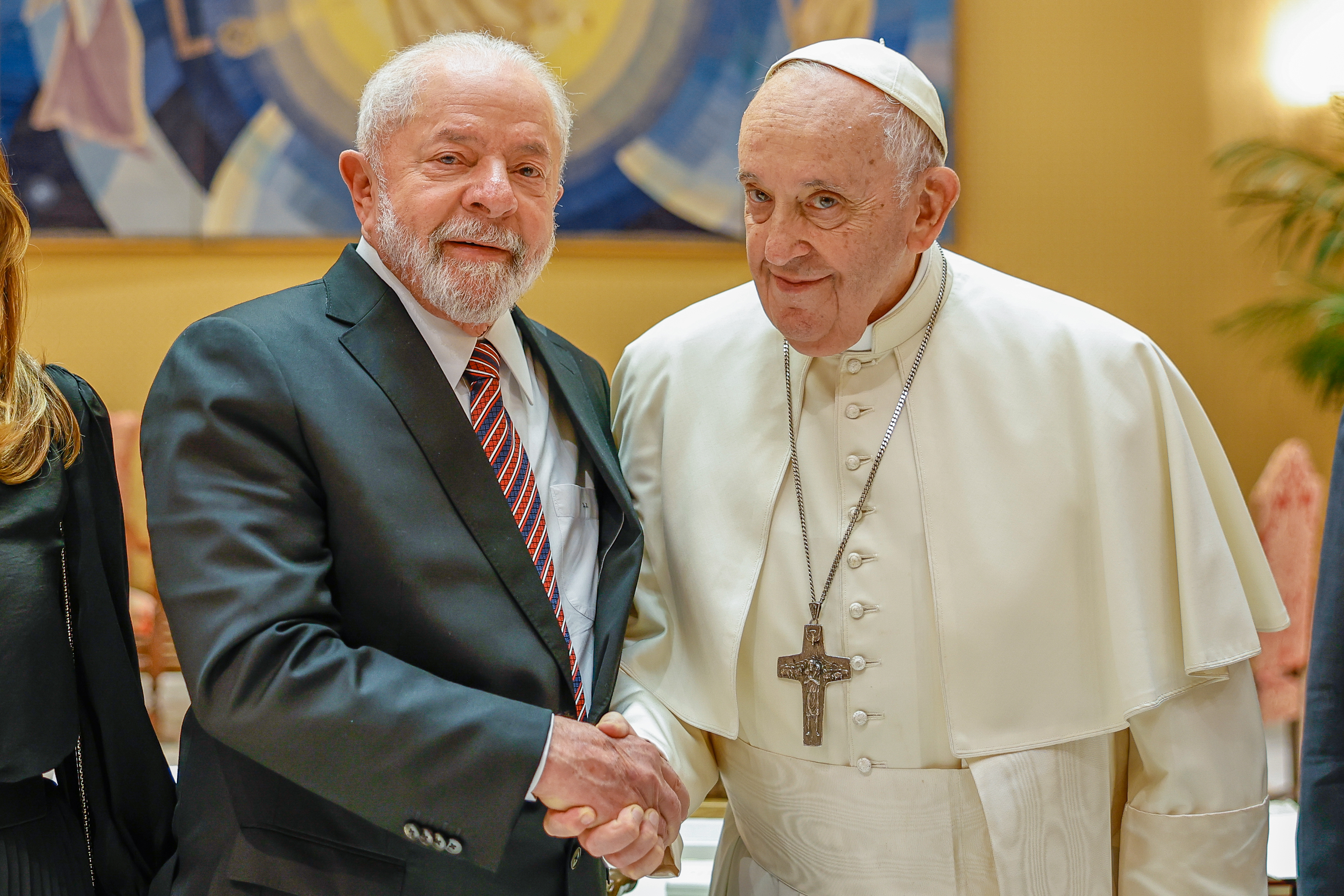
Francis and Brazilian president Luiz Inácio Lula da Silva, in 2023

Following the February 2022 Russian invasion of Ukraine, a major escalation of the Russo-Ukrainian War, Francis visited the Russian embassy in Rome, an unprecedented action. He called Ukrainian president Volodymyr Zelenskyy to express "sorrow" as the Vatican worked to find "room for negotiation" to end the war. The day after the invasion began in February 2022, Francis assured Sviatoslav Shevchuk, the major archbishop of the Ukrainian Greek Catholic Church, that "he would do everything he can to help end the Ukraine conflict". During 27 February 2022 Angelus address, Francis called for peace, saying, "Silence the weapons!" At a September 2022 interfaith event in Kazakhstan, Francis urged Patriarch Kirill not to become an "altar boy" of Putin's.

Throughout the war, Francis had called for an end to armed conflict. Initially, he avoided specific criticism of Russia and President Putin, frustrating many Ukrainians. Later, he described Ukraine as "martyred" and prayed for the victims of Russian aggression but still did not directly criticize Putin or the Russian government. His statements aligned more with countries like Brazil, India, and China rather than the US and Europe—a stance some attribute to his distrust of America. Francis warned against what he called a "simplistic good versus evil perception of the conflict", saying that a world leader who he did not name told him that NATO was "barking at the gates" of Russia, which led him to believe that the conflict was "somehow either provoked or not prevented." These remarks damaged the Vatican's standing as a mediator in the conflict because supporters of Ukraine saw them as echoing Russian narratives about the war.

Francis's blanket denunciations of arms transfers and the weapons industry seemed to condemn Western military aid to Ukraine. In a September 2022 press conference, seven months into the war, Francis said that it was "licit" and justified for Ukraine to defend itself but called for a negotiated settlement (saying that there must be "dialogue with any power that is at war, even if it is with the aggressor" and even when "it stinks"). He also suggested that arms transfers to Ukraine were "a political decision which it can be moral, morally acceptable, if it is done under conditions of morality." He later said that Ukrainians were a "noble" people and recounted Cardinal Konrad Krajewski's reports of the "savage acts, the monstrosity, the tortured bodies" inflicted upon Ukraine.

Francis's stances were rooted in part in his hope that the Vatican could broker a peace deal between Ukraine and Russia, a possibility that analysts viewed as extremely unlikely. He dispatched two high-ranking Vatican officials—Cardinals Krajewski and Michael Czerny—as envoys on several trips to Ukraine in 2022. which was considered a highly unusual move of Vatican diplomacy. In March 2022, Francis consecrated both Russia and Ukraine to the Immaculate Heart of Mary. Francis said in April 2023, during a trip to Budapest, that he was working on a secret "mission" to bring peace and return Ukrainian children abducted by Russia. However, Francis's efforts to position the Vatican as a mediator were unsuccessful.

In early October 2022, Francis for the first time directly appealed to Putin to halt the "spiral of violence and death" in Ukraine. In the same speech, Francis asked Ukrainian president Zelenskyy to be open about "serious peace proposals" while recognizing that Ukraine had suffered an "aggression" and saying that he was "pained about the suffering of the Ukrainian people".

=== Armenia ===
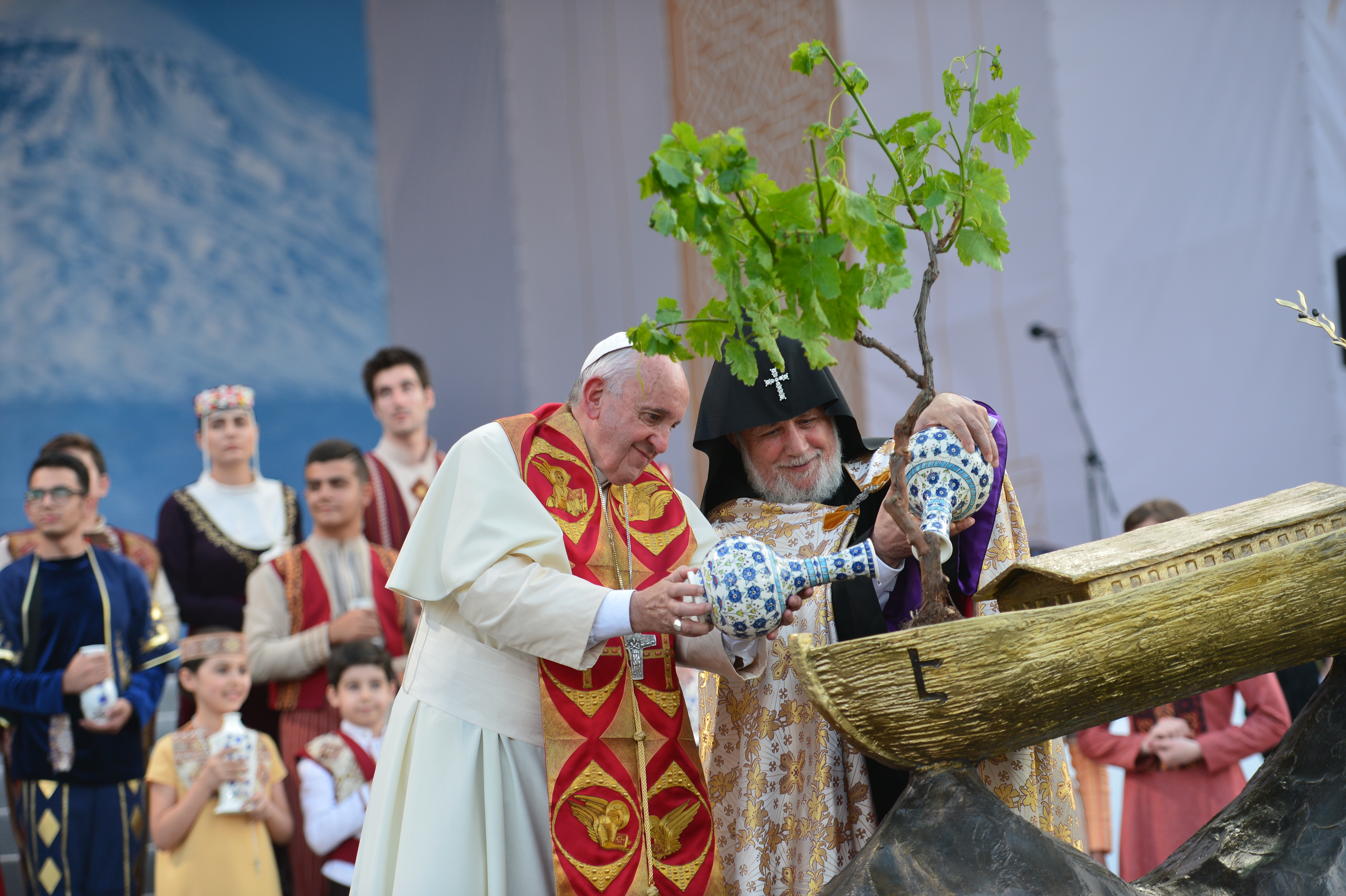
Pope Francis and Catholicos Garegin II at an ecumenic ceremony in the Republic Square, Yerevan, Armenia, June 2016

On the 100th anniversary of the Armenian genocide in April 2015, Francis held a Vatican Mass where he explicitly described the World War I slaughter of Armenians as "the first genocide of the 20th century", inciting diplomatic anger from Turkey.

In June 2016, Francis made a historic three-day visit to Armenia under his "Visit to the First Christian Nation" pilgrimage, where he honored the victims of the Armenian genocide at the Tsitsernakaberd memorial and joined prayers in the Etchmiadzin Cathedral. He again explicitly referred to the 1915 tragedy as "the first genocide of the 20th century". He signed a joint declaration with Catholicos Garegin II of the Armenian Apostolic Church, citing a strengthening of ties between Armenian Apostolic and Catholic churches.

In October 2023, in the midst of the second Nagorno-Karabakh conflict, Francis called for peace in the region following the displacement of over 100,000 ethnic Armenians from Karabakh. The following year, during a meeting with the Armenian bishops in the Vatican, Francis again held prayers for Armenia: "... how can we not turn our thoughts to Armenia (...) in our prayers, particularly for all those fleeing Nagorno-Karabakh and for the many displaced families seeking refuge?"

=== In the Muslim world ===
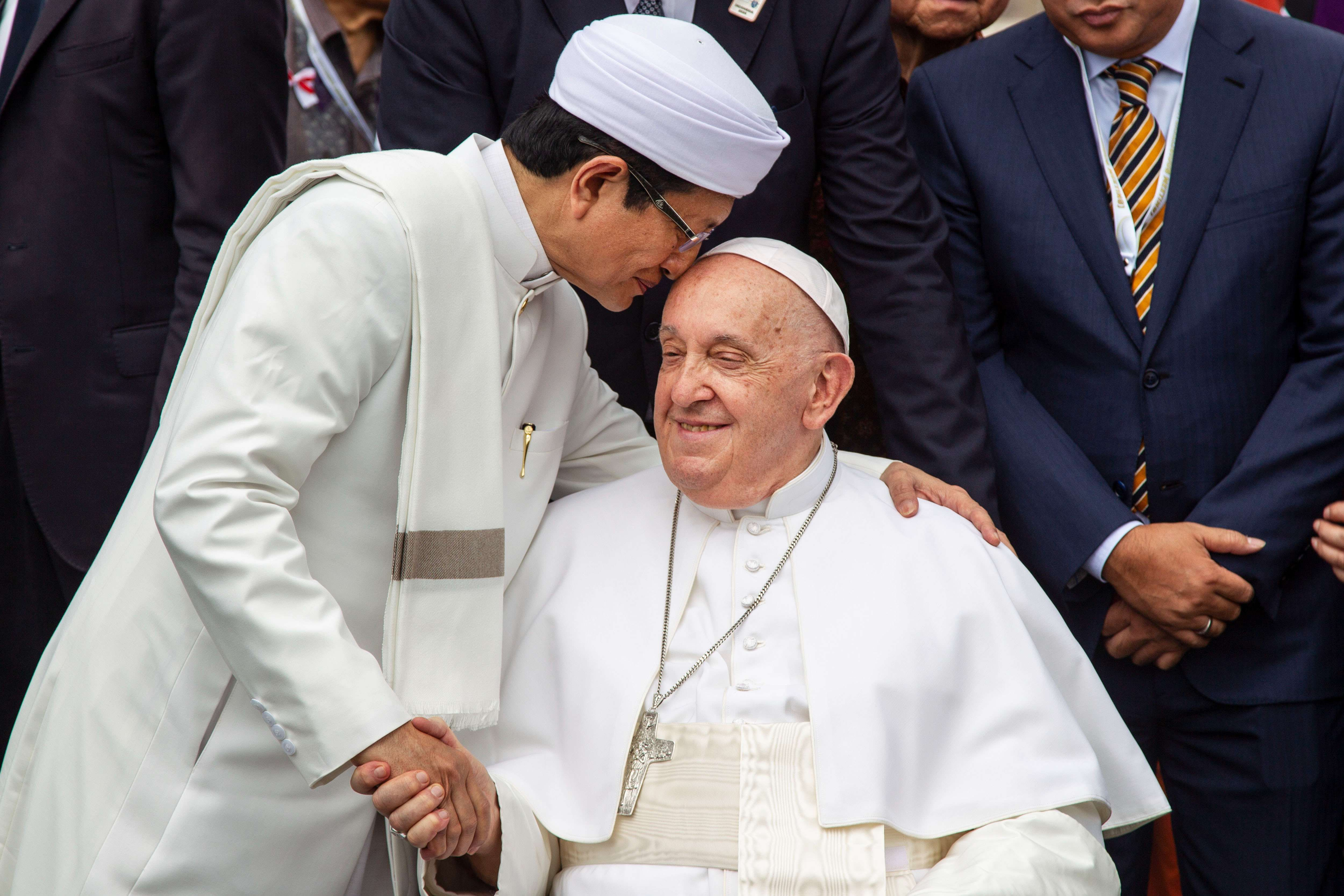
Istiqlal Mosque Grand Imam Nasaruddin Umar kisses the forehead of Francis, September 2024

Francis condemned the persecution of Christians by ISIL and supported the use of force to stop Islamic militants from attacking religious minorities in Iraq. In January 2018, Francis met Yazidi refugees in Europe, expressed his support for their right to religious freedom, and called upon the international community "not to remain a silent and unresponsive spectator" to the Yazidi genocide.

In February 2019, Francis visited Abu Dhabi, United Arab Emirates, on the invitation of Mohammed bin Zayed Al Nahyan. Francis became the first pope to celebrate Mass on the Arabian Peninsula, attended by more than 120,000 attendees at the Zayed Sports City Stadium.

In March 2021, Francis held a historic meeting with Iraq's top Shi'ite cleric, Grand Ayatollah Ali al-Sistani, and visited Ur, a site traditionally identified as the birthplace of the prophet Abraham. He and the Iraqi cleric urged the Muslim and Christian communities to work together for peaceful coexistence.

In September 2024, Francis visited Indonesia, the country with the largest Muslim population, where he attended inter-religious dialogue in Istiqlal Mosque in Jakarta and was welcomed by the Grand Imam Nasaruddin Umar. Francis and the Grand Imam additionally signed the Joint Declaration of Istiqlal 2024, underscoring that the values common to all religious traditions be effectively promoted to "defeat the culture of violence and indifference" and promote reconciliation and peace. The declaration was also read and attended by representatives from other religions, including Protestants, Hindus, Buddhists, Confucians, and Folk religions.

=== G7 ===
The family photo of the 50th G7 summit in Fasano, Italy. Francis was the first pontiff to attend and speak at a G7 Summit.

Pope Francis was the first pontiff to participate in the G7, a meeting of leaders of the largest developed economies in the world. During his speech at the G7 forum in Italy, he stressed that humanity is in great danger due to the wars that are taking place such as the wars in Ukraine and in Gaza. He also stated that the excessive use of artificial intelligence is posing a risk to jobs, and remarked on reproductive practices without specifically mentioning abortion.

=== Elsewhere ===
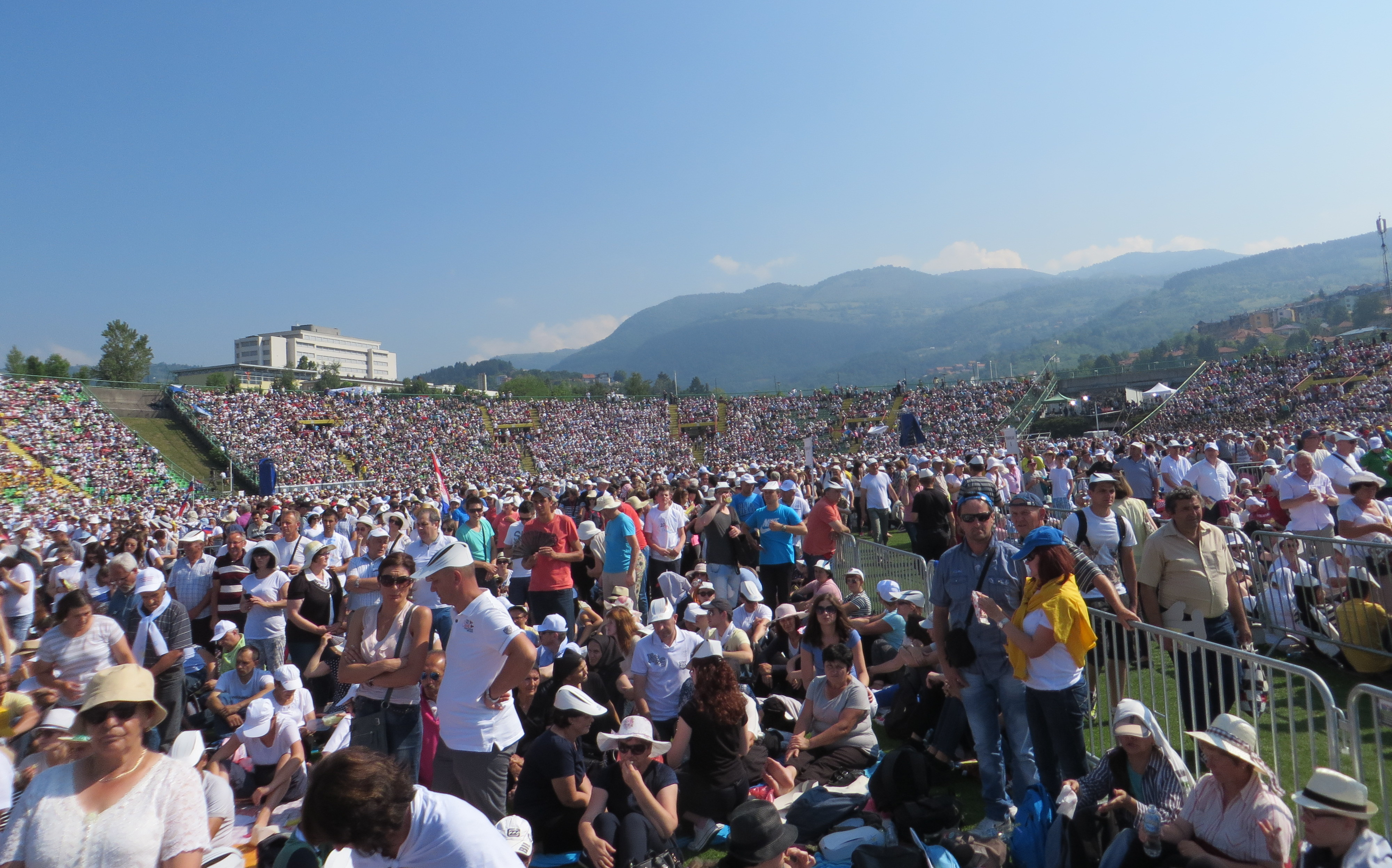
Crowd at the Koševo City Stadium in Sarajevo, celebrating a Mass with Francis, June 2015

In September 2015, Francis visited the United Nations Headquarters in New York City where he addressed the UN General Assembly; following his speech, he visited the National September 11 Memorial and Museum. In June 2023, Francis issued an address to the UN Security Council while recovering from abdominal surgery; the statement was read by Vatican official Paul Gallagher on the Pope's behalf.

After the 2017 Catalan independence referendum that originated the 2017–18 Spanish constitutional crisis on 1 October 2017, Francis communicated to the Spanish ambassador to the Holy See Gerardo Bugallo that the Vatican would not recognize secessionist or self-determination movements that were not the result of decolonization.

== Public image ==
External videos
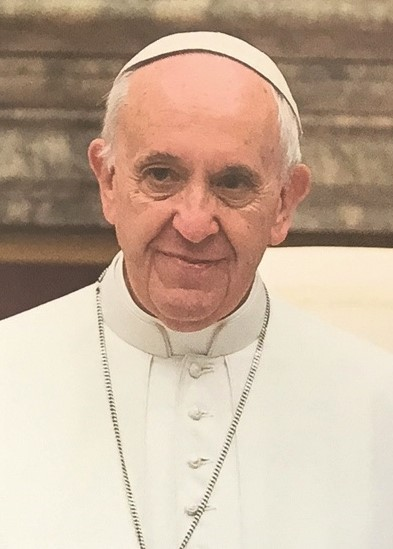
- Why the only future worth building includes everyone, TED talks, April 2017, 17:51, in Italian with subtitles in 22 languages

Francis was frequently described as a progressive. Commentator William Saletan described Francis as liberal and fundamentally anti-conservative in his analysis of Francis's first long interview after becoming pope, highlighting Francis's statements "God is to be encountered in the world of today" and "God manifests himself in historical revelation, in history". Other have contested descriptions of Francis as liberal. In 2014, the Vatican criticized some Italian news agencies, as well as the Agence France-Presse, for reporting that a comment Francis made was suggestive of an opening toward acceptance of same-sex marriage or civil unions; a Vatican spokesperson said the pope's remark was taken out of context.

Important aspects of Francis's public image include "his recognizable humanity" and gestures of humility, as well as his efforts to preserve his autonomy amid Roman Curia bureaucracy. He was a frequent user of landline telephones; he reportedly had never owned a computer or mobile phone. Shortly before his death, Francis donated most of his personal wealth, approximately €200,000, to support a pasta-making project at a youth prison in Rome.

In December 2013, both Time and The Advocate magazines named Francis as their "Person of the Year"; Esquire magazine named him as the "Best-dressed man" for 2013, citing his simpler vestments. Rolling Stone magazine followed in January 2014 by making him their featured front cover. Fortune magazine also ranked Francis as number one in their list of 50 greatest leaders. He was included in Forbes lists of most powerful people in the world in 2014 and 2016.

In March 2013, a new song was dedicated to Francis and released in Brazilian Portuguese, European Portuguese, and Italian, titled Come Puoi (How You Can). A street in La Plata, Argentina, was renamed Papa Francisco in his honor. The Argentine Chamber of Deputies passed legislation to mint a commemorative coin as a tribute to Francis in 2013. As of 2013, sales of papal souvenirs, a sign of popularity, were up.

Francis presided over his first joint public wedding ceremony in a Nuptial Mass for 20 couples from the Archdiocese of Rome on 14 September 2014, a few weeks before the start of 5–19 October Third Extraordinary General Assembly of the Synod of Bishops (the Synod on the Family). (Note: Pope Emeritus Benedict XVI did not do this during his eight-year papacy from 2005 to 2013; his predecessor, Pope John Paul II, married a group of couples from all over the world in 2000, as part of the Jubilee for Families, and before that in 1994 during the church's Year of the Family, as well as presiding over a number of private marriages as pope.)

In 2016, Francis became the first pope to create an Instagram account. He broke records after having gained over one million followers in under 12 hours of the account being up. On 26 November 2020, Francis became the first pope to write an op-ed for The New York Times, addressing issues such as COVID-19 restrictions on public gatherings and the need for global solidarity.

Francis was a longtime supporter of the football club San Lorenzo de Almagro, where his father played in the basketball department. The Argentine club proceeded to visit Francis at the Vatican after winning both the 2013 Torneo Inicial and the 2014 Copa Libertadores, where he was gifted replicas of both trophies and a glove of goalkeeper Sebastian Torrico.

== Health ==
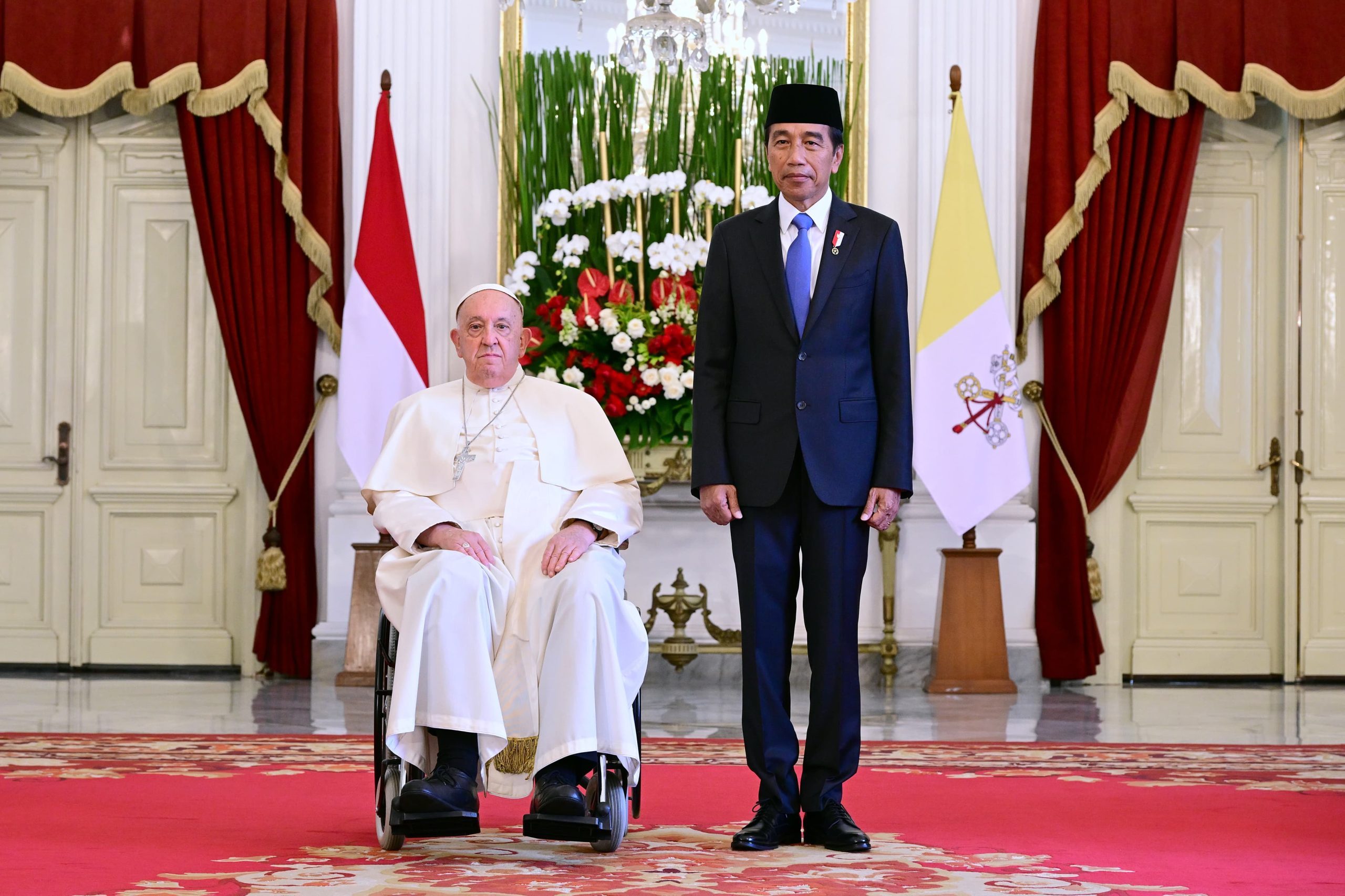
Francis with then-President of Indonesia Joko Widodo in September 2024. Francis had publicly used a wheelchair since 2022.

Elected at the age of 76, Francis was reported to be healthy; his doctors had said the lung tissue removed in his youth did not significantly affect his health. The only concern would be decreased respiratory reserve if he had a respiratory infection. The Pope had suffered from chronic lung damage, due in part to the lung excision he had as a young man. In the last few years of his life, he was prone to bouts of influenza and bronchitis in the winter. Knee problems and sciatica prompted him to frequently use a wheelchair, walker, or cane. In 2021, the Pope's health problems prompted rumors that he might resign, which Francis dismissed. In June 2022, after undergoing treatment to his knee, Francis canceled planned trips to the Democratic Republic of the Congo and South Sudan.

In March 2023, Francis was hospitalized in Rome with a respiratory infection. He returned to celebrate the Easter Vigil Mass on Holy Saturday, in April. In June, Francis underwent abdominal surgery after suffering from a hernia. He acknowledged that his recurring mobility problems had precipitated the beginning of what Reuters termed "a new, slower phase of his papacy", although he was praised by disabled Catholics for making his "disability part of his visible identity".

In February 2025, Francis entered Gemelli Hospital in Rome due to bronchitis. He remained for more than a month after developing a polymicrobial infection of his respiratory tract and bilateral pneumonia. Vatican News described his condition as critical and reported that he was given blood transfusions and high-flow oxygen. Eventually, Francis was put on mechanical ventilation for a number of days, and suffered two episodes of "acute respiratory insufficiency". After the infection improved, he was discharged from the hospital on 23 March, immediately after blessing a crowd from his balcony. He was expected to spend at least two months recuperating at his home in Domus Sanctae Marthae in Vatican City, maintaining a reduced work schedule. He appeared in public for the first time since his hospitalization on 6 April.

== Death ==
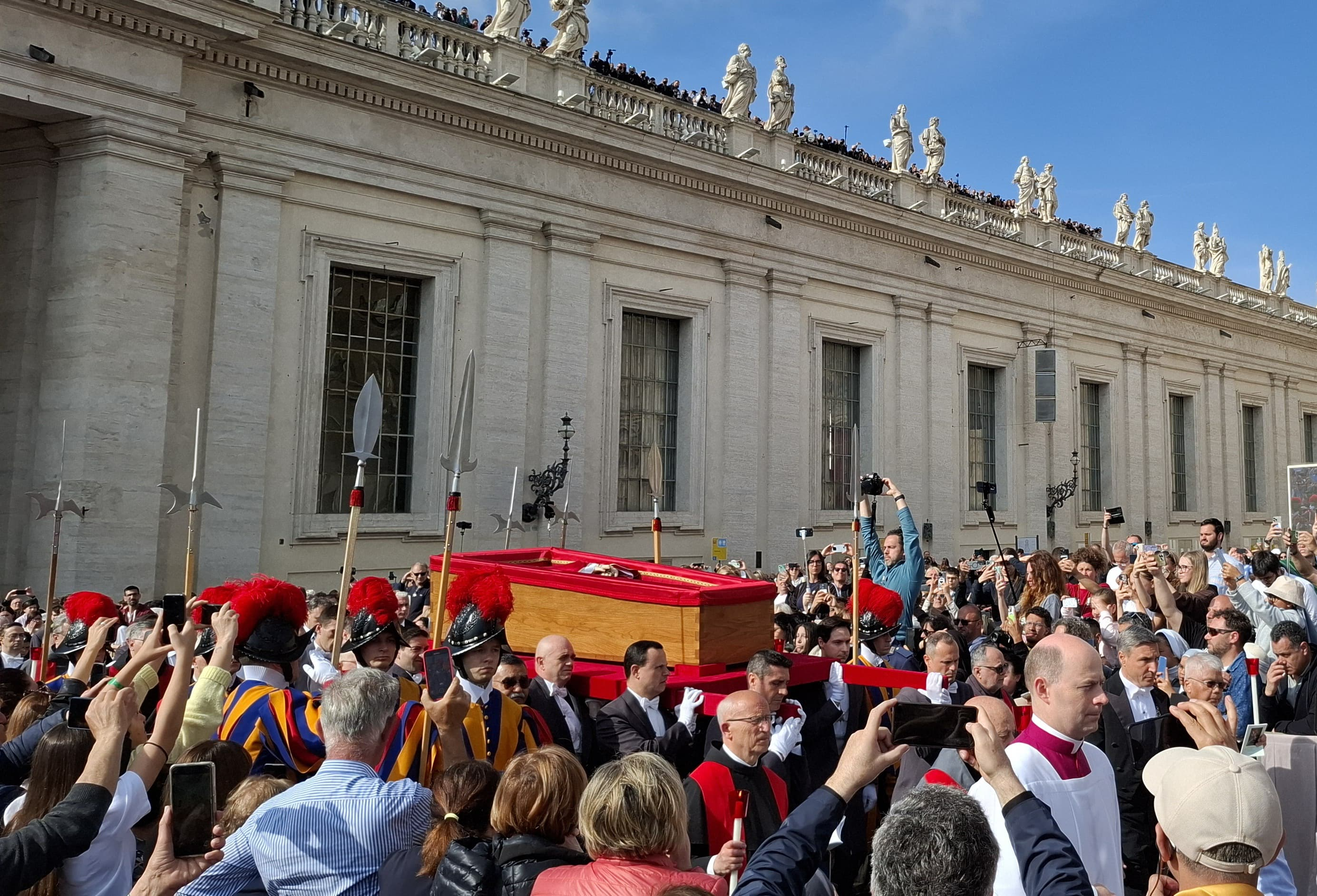
Procession of the body of Pope Francis in the Vatican

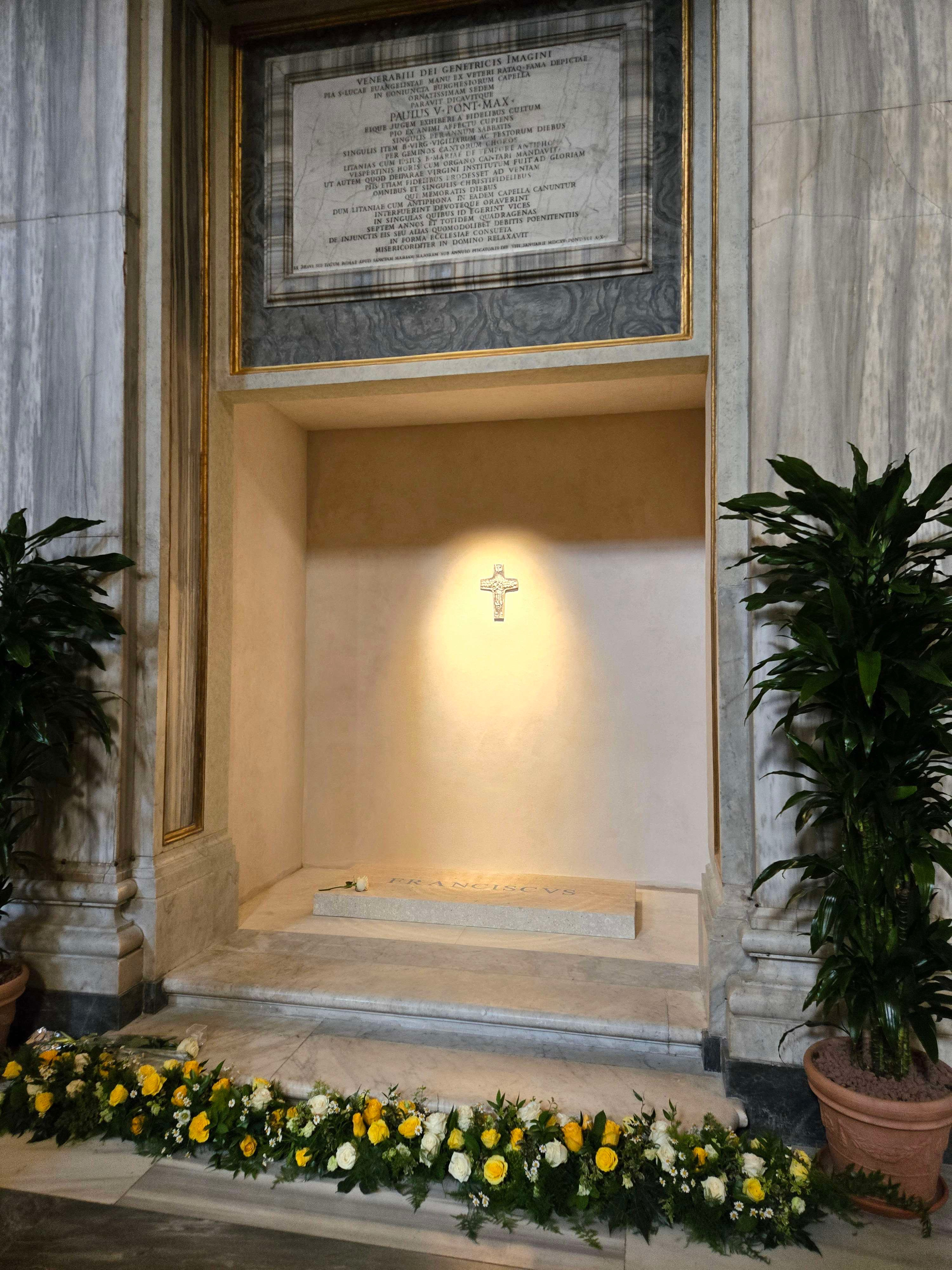
Francis's tomb in Santa Maria Maggiore

Francis's last public appearance was at St. Peter's Square in Vatican City on Easter Sunday, 20 April 2025, where he gave his final Easter address and called for a ceasefire in Gaza. He died at 07:35 local time (UTC+02:00) on Easter Monday, 21 April 2025, aged 88, in his residence in Domus Sanctae Marthae. His death, announced by Cardinal Kevin Farrell on the Vatican's TV channel and in a video statement, was caused by a cerebral stroke, which led to a coma and irreversible cardiac arrest.

The pope's death began a papal interregnum and a nine-day period of mourning known as the novendiales (Latin for 'nine days'). His funeral took place on 26 April 2025. Cardinal electors arrived in Rome to attend the congregation of cardinals and decided that 7 May 2025 would be the start of the conclave set to elect Francis's successor. On 8 May, Robert Francis Prevost, who was made a cardinal by Francis in 2023, was elected as Pope Leo XIV.

Francis's spiritual testament, dated 29 June 2022, repeated his wish to be buried at the Basilica of Santa Maria Maggiore in Rome. Upon his death, he was laid to rest there in accordance with his testament, becoming the first pope to be interred in the Santa Maria Maggiore since Clement IX in 1669. His testament ended:

May the Lord grant a fitting reward to all those who have loved me and who continue to pray for me. The suffering that has marked the final part of my life, I offer to the Lord, for peace in the world and for fraternity among peoples.

== Legacy ==
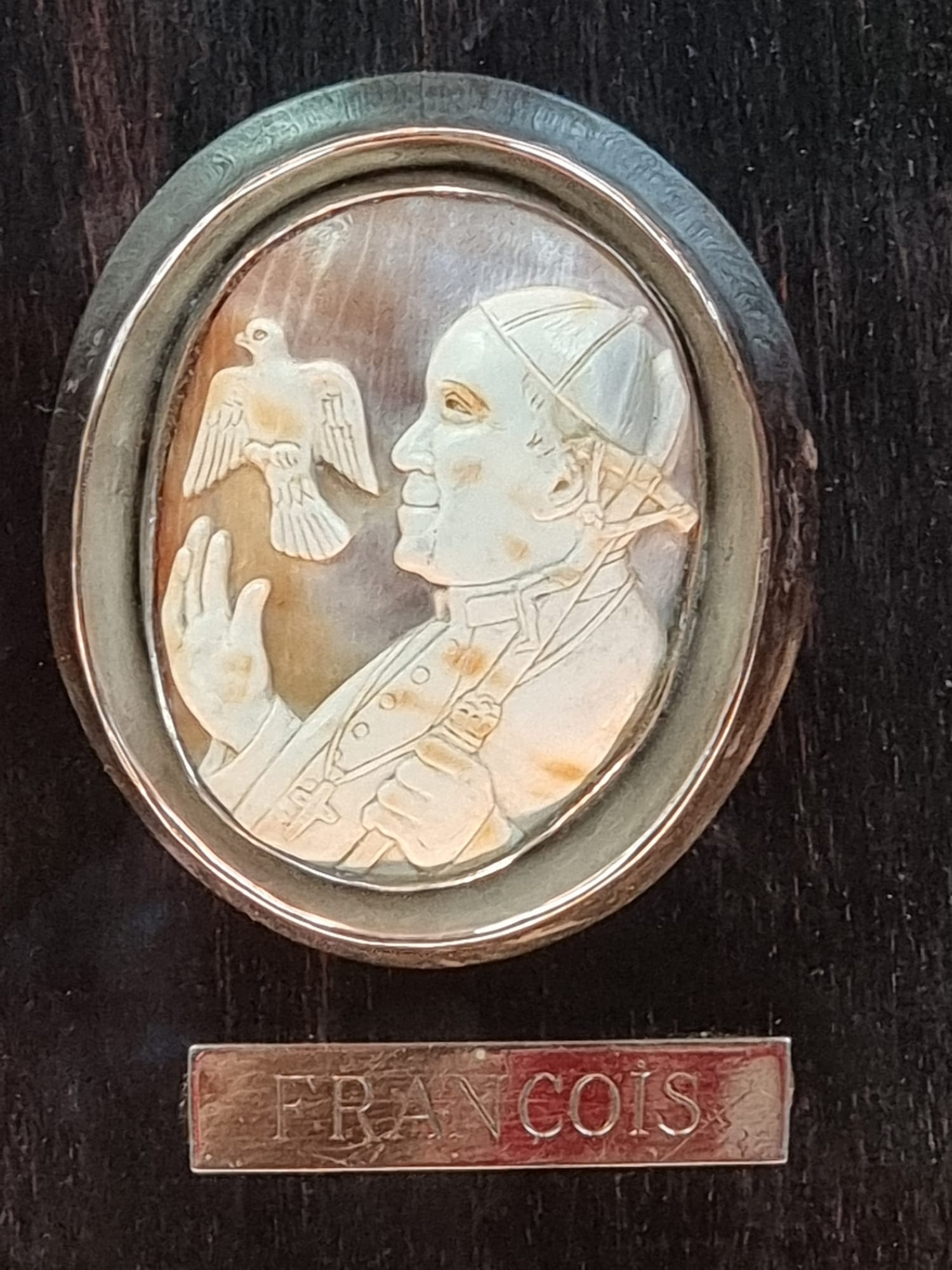
Pope Francis cameo ivory on wood carving at Notre Dame de Paris, France

Francis's papacy coincided with a period of widespread change and reckoning within the global Catholic order and within society at large. Throughout his papacy, he was noted for his support for the plight of refugees, migrants, and the impoverished. Since their beginnings, he had been outspoken in his criticism of the wars in Ukraine, Sudan, Gaza, DR Congo, and Myanmar, notwithstanding numerous other conflicts and acts of suppression against the civilian population globally. He appointed more than 80% of the cardinals that elected his successor, Leo XIV, notably reducing the European share of the College of Cardinals from a majority to a plurality. He was celebrated for his outreach to China and the African continent, his tolerance towards differing faith communities, and his attention to younger Catholic adherents and the changing nature of the faith. Additionally, he formalized the church's policy of opposition to the death penalty in all cases.

Under his papacy, he maintained the prohibition of women being ordained clergy, or being appointed to the College of Bishops and the Cardinals. However, Francis made significant strides towards increasing women's presence in the senior and central administration of the church. He was the first to grant them voting rights within the Synod of Bishops, and increased their presence in functions and institutions of the Church that had previously been restricted to or dominated by men. He had nonetheless been criticized by some as having only produced reform within existing frameworks of gender division within the Catholic Church, doing little to advance serious, radical reform of its institutions to ensure an ideal of inclusion and parity.

He set himself apart from other Popes in upholding the Church's departure from the Tridentine Mass, which had only been loosely enforced by both predecessors whose reign occurred after the institution of the reforms of the Second Vatican Council. Though it was not banned outright during his tenure, he nonetheless greatly increased Vatican oversight over the facilitation of the ritual, and restricted the right of new priests to engage in the practice. These policies were controversial among traditionalist Catholics.

In 2022, he issued the first apology by the Vatican for its role in the cultural erasure and forced assimilation of First Nations peoples in Canada from the late 19th to mid-20th centuries. His endorsement of the blessing of individuals in same-sex relationships earned him praise from many progressive outlets within and outside the Church and criticism from conservative circles. Some groups, though, have been critical of the extent of his tolerance on various LGBTQ issues, particularly the question of his acceptance of transgender identity and his answer to the larger issue of homosexuality, queer identity, and sin. The progressive stances he held drew significant criticism from conservative elements within the college.

== Distinctions ==
=== Titles and styles ===
The official form of address of the Pope in English was His Holiness Pope Francis. Holy Father was among the other honorifics used for popes.

=== Foreign orders ===
- Bolivia: : Grand Collar of the Order of the Condor of the Andes (9 July 2015)
- Bolivia: Order of Merit "Father Luis Espinal Camps" (9 July 2015)
- Poland: : Order of the Smile (26 April 2016)
- United States: : Presidential Medal of Freedom with Distinction (11 January 2025)

=== Awards ===
- Olympic Order (2013)
- Germany: International Charlemagne Prize of Aachen (2016)
- "Person of the Year" by People for the Ethical Treatment of Animals (2015) for his request that all Catholics be kind to animals.
- Francis was made an honorary Harlem Globetrotter on 7 May 2015.
- Francis was granted an honorary black belt by World Taekwondo in 2017.
- Zayed Award for Human Fraternity in October 2020 for significant contributions to the service of humanity from around the world.
- Brazil: Medalha Mérito Legislativo awarded by the Congress of Brazil in November 2021.
- Grand Chief Willie Littlechild gifted Francis with the Indigenous name "Wapikihew" ("White Eagle") on behalf of the Ermineskin Cree Nation and presented him with a traditional Cree War bonnet following the Pope's apology to the Indigenous peoples in Canada at Maskwacis, Alberta, on 25 July 2022.

=== Honorific eponyms and dedications ===
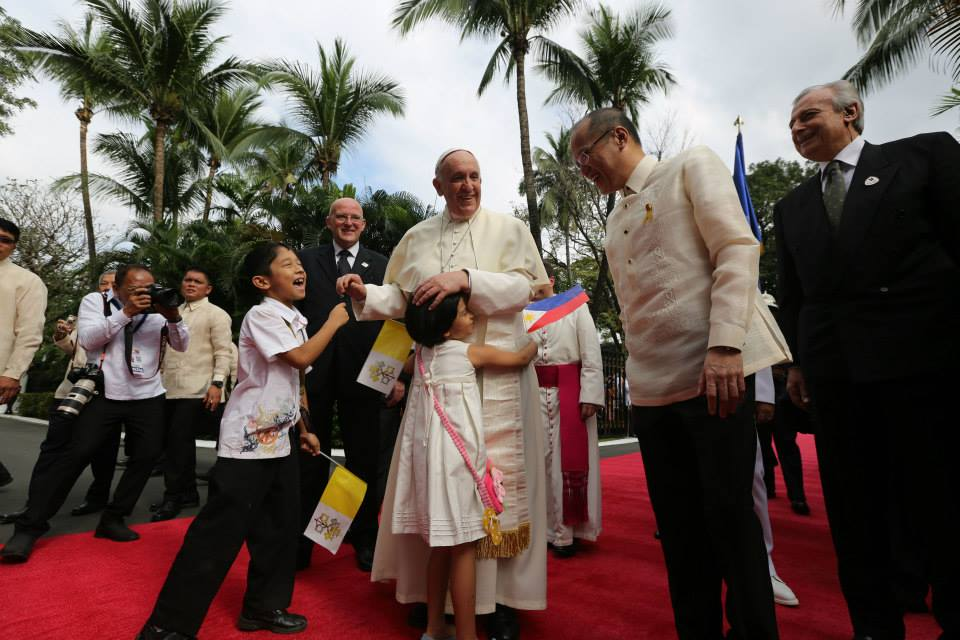
Francis and Philippine president Benigno Aquino III in Manila, 16 January 2015

- Philippines: The Pope Francis Center for the Poor – Palo, Leyte (12 July 2015)
- South Sudan: "H.H. Pope Francis Road" in Juba was inaugurated by President Salva Kiir days before his 2023 visit to the country. The President said, "the road was named after the Holy Father as a gift by South Sudanese to Pope Francis."
- Ennio Morricone composed a Mass setting (Missa Papae Francisci) named after the Pope for the occasion of the 200th anniversary of the restoration of the Jesuit order. The performance aired on Rai 5 and was attended by former Italian president Giorgio Napolitano and other dignitaries.
- The composer Ludger Stühlmeyer dedicated his work Klangrede – Sonnengesang des Franziskus, for choir (SATB) and instruments – to Pope Francis (Suae Sanctitati Papae Francisci dedicat). First performance: Capella Mariana 4 October 2015.
- The rodent species Oecomys franciscorum, discovered in 2016, was named after both Francis and Francisco Maldonado da Silva, a victim of the Peruvian Inquisition.
- In the oratorio Laudato si' by Peter Reulein (music) written on a libretto by Helmut Schlegel OFM, the figure of Francis appears. It was first performed at Limburg Cathedral in 2016.

== Coat of arms ==
Coat of arms of Pope Francis
Notes Pope Francis's initial grant of arms by the Holy See was as Archbishop of Buenos Aires, when he was Cardinal Bergoglio, in which the depiction of the star and spikenard were tinctured argent. Following his election as pope, these are now tinctured or. The first version of Francis's coat of arms released by the Vatican Press Office depicted a five-pointed star from Bergoglio's archiepiscopal version, but his coat of arms upon election as pope assumed an eight-pointed star, with the depiction of the spikenard also being suitably differenced. Adopted 18 March 2013 Helm Bishop's miter Escutcheon Azure on a sun in splendour or the IHS Christogram ensigned with a cross pattée fiché piercing the H gules all above three nails fanwise points to center sable, and in dexter base a mullet of eight points and in sinister base a spikenard flower or. Motto MISERANDO ATQUE ELIGENDO (Latin for 'By giving mercy and by choosing') Other elements Keys of Peter behind the shield and papal mantling Symbolism Jesuit emblem: Emblem of the Society of Jesus, in reference to Francis being a Jesuit. This charge displays a radiating sun within which is the monogram of the Holy Name of Jesus in red, with a red cross surmounting the H and three black nails below the H. Eight-pointed star: A long-standing symbol of the Virgin Mary. Spikenard: The spikenard flower represents Saint Joseph; in Hispanic iconographic tradition Saint Joseph is often depicted holding a branch of spikenard.

== Media ==
By 2015, there were two biographical films about Francis: Call Me Francesco (Italy, 2015), starring Rodrigo de la Serna, and Francis: Pray for me (Argentina, 2015), starring Darío Grandinetti. A music album, Wake Up!, consisting of speeches by Francis accompanied by music was released on 27 November 2015.

Several documentaries have been created about Francis. Pope Francis: A Man of His Word (2018) is a documentary film co-written and directed by Wim Wenders. On 21 October 2020, the documentary Francesco directed by film producer Evgeny Afineevsky premiered. On 4 October 2022, the documentary The Letter: A Message for our Earth premiered on YouTube Originals, directed by Nicolas Brown and produced by Off The Fence in partnership with Laudato Si' Movement.

Francis was played by Jonathan Pryce in the biographical film The Two Popes (2019).

== See also ==
- List of popes

== Notes ==
Catholic Church titles
Preceded by Theodor Hubrich	— TITULAR — Bishop of Auca; 20 May 1992 – 3 June 1997	Succeeded by Mieczysław Cisło
Preceded by Antonio Quarracino	Archbishop of Buenos Aires; 28 February 1998 – 13 March 2013	Succeeded by Mario Aurelio Poli
Preceded by Antonio Quarracino	Ordinary for the Faithful of the Eastern Rites; 6 November 1998 – 13 March 2013	Succeeded by Mario Aurelio Poli
Preceded by Augusto Vargas Alzamora	Cardinal Priest of San Roberto Bellarmino; 21 February 2001 – 13 March 2013	Succeeded by Mario Aurelio Poli
Preceded by Eduardo Vicente Mirás	President of the Argentine Episcopal Conference; 8 November 2005 – 8 November 2011	Succeeded by José María Arancedo
Preceded by Benedict XVI	Pope; 13 March 2013 – 21 April 2025	Succeeded by Leo XIV
