= Extraordinary minister of Holy Communion =

Lay person distributing Holy Communion in the Catholic Church

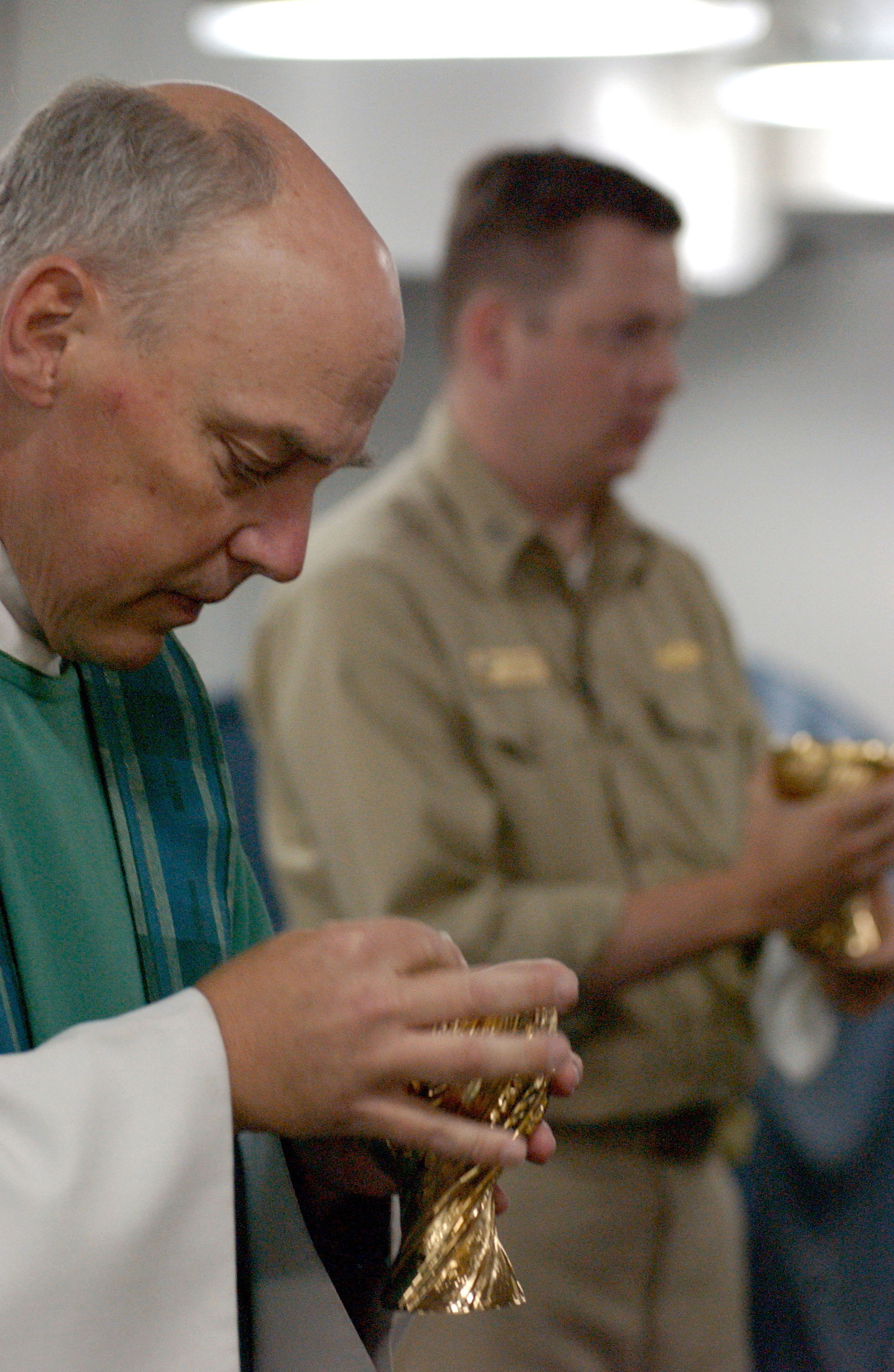
An ordinary minister (priest, foreground) and extraordinary minister (layman, background) distribute Holy Communion.

An extraordinary minister of Holy Communion in the Catholic Church is, under the 1983 Code of Canon Law, "an acolyte, or another of Christ's faithful deputed", in certain circumstances, to distribute Holy Communion. The term "extraordinary" distinguishes such a person from the ordinary minister of Holy Communion, namely a bishop, priest or deacon. Typically only bishops, priests, and deacons may distribute Communion in the Catholic Church.

The 1983 code permits that "[w]here the needs of the Church require and ministers are not available, lay people, even though they are not lectors or acolytes, can supply certain of their functions, that is, exercise the ministry of the word, preside over liturgical prayers, confer baptism and distribute Holy Communion, in accordance with the provisions of the law."

== Function ==
The extraordinary minister's function is to distribute Holy Communion, either within Mass or by taking it to a sick person, when an ordained minister (bishop, priest or deacon) is absent or impeded.

In order to avoid confusion about this function, an extraordinary minister of Holy Communion is not to be called a "special minister of Holy Communion", nor an "extraordinary Minister of the Eucharist", nor a "special minister of the Eucharist".

Ten years before publication of the 1983 Code of Canon Law, some of these expressions were used in the instruction of the Sacred Congregation of the Sacraments Immensae caritatis of 29 January 1973. They are now reprobated.

The only minister of the Eucharist (that is, someone able to confect the Eucharistic species with bread and wine) is a priest or bishop.

== Appointment ==
An instituted acolyte is an extraordinary minister of Holy Communion by virtue of his institution. Such acolytes are, in practice, seminarians or former seminarians, or those in deacon formation, although canon law allows the ministry to be conferred on any lay people, men or women, who have the age and qualifications that the episcopal conference is to lay down. The local bishop, pastor, or priest celebrant may depute other lay Catholics for the temporary function of extraordinary minister of Holy Communion, either for a single occasion or for a specified period of time, if there are reasons of real necessity. The commissioning need not take a liturgical form, but an appropriate blessing, which should in no way resemble ordination, may be imparted. In special cases of an unforeseen nature, the priest celebrating Mass may grant permission for a single occasion.

== Controversy ==
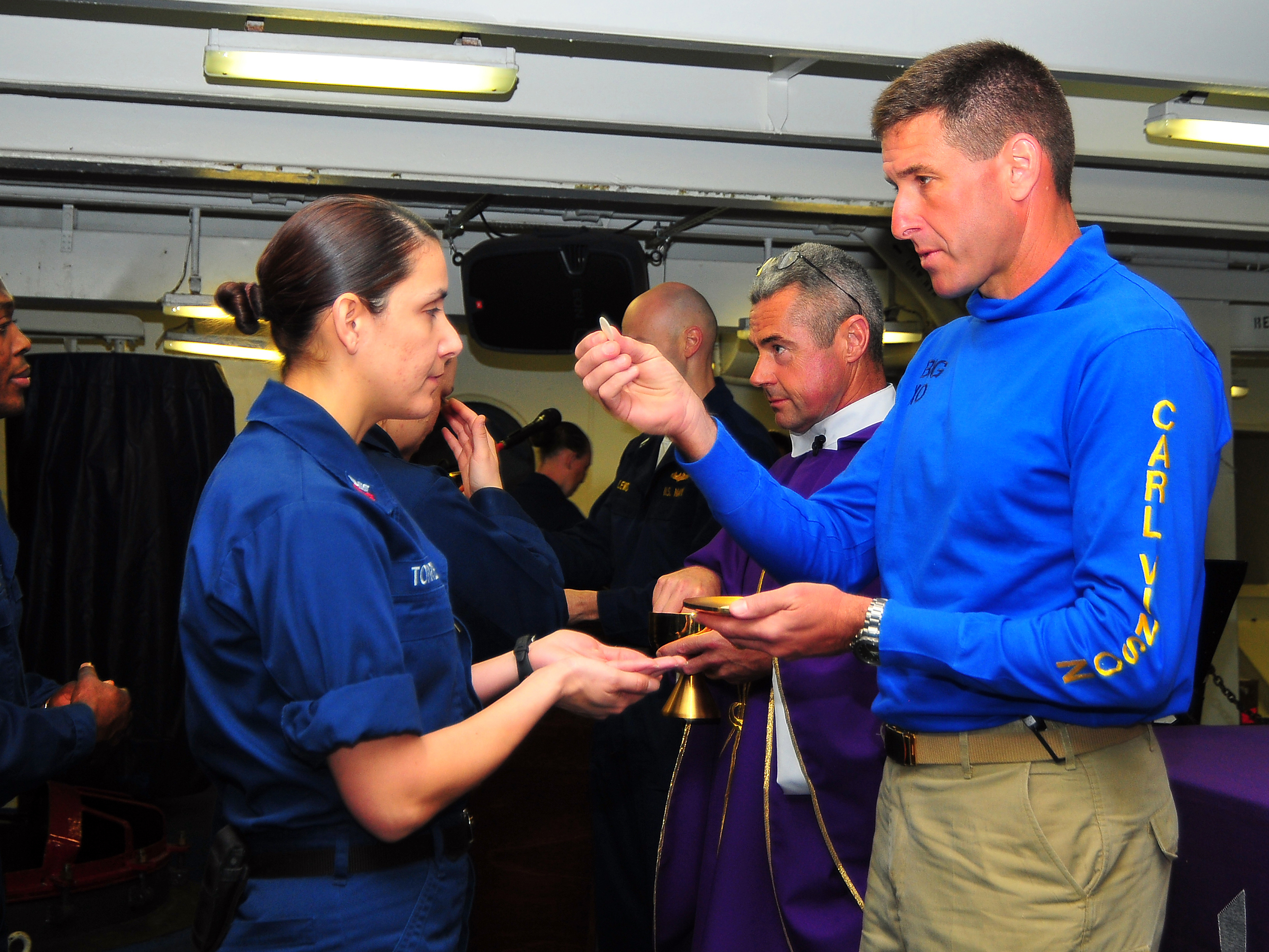
A U.S. naval officer assists a priest in giving Communion.

Redemptionis sacramentum states: "If there is usually present a sufficient number of sacred ministers for the distribution of Holy Communion, extraordinary ministers of Holy Communion may not be appointed. Indeed, in such circumstances, those who may have already been appointed to this ministry should not exercise it. The practice of those priests is reprobated who, even though present at the celebration, abstain from distributing Communion and hand this function over to laypersons." The document adds: "the extraordinary minister of Holy Communion may administer Communion only when the Priest and Deacon are lacking, when the Priest is prevented by weakness or advanced age or some other genuine reason, or when the number of faithful coming to Communion is so great that the very celebration of Mass would be unduly prolonged. [...] [A] brief prolongation, considering the circumstances and culture of the place, is not at all a sufficient reason".

For a time, extraordinary ministers of Holy Communion in the United States were allowed to purify the Communion vessels (such as ciboria and chalices), an action that the 2010 General Instruction of the Roman Missal expressly reserves for priest, deacon and instituted acolyte. The special indult authorizing that practice for three years, beginning in 2002, was not renewed.

Due to large number of attendees, virtually all Masses in the Philippines employ the use of extraordinary ministers of Holy Communion; commissioning of ministers and renewal of their vows is a regular occurrence. In early 2023, claims regarding Freemasons distributing Holy Communion in some parishes prompted the Catholic Bishops' Conference of the Philippines to restate its stance on "the unacceptability of Masonry, given its serious errors".
