= Confirmation in the Catholic Church =

Sacrament in the Catholic Church

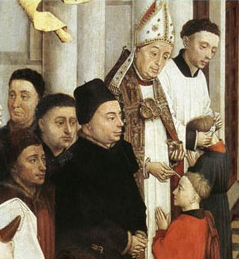
The Seven Sacraments Altarpiece, by Rogier van der Weyden, depicting a Latin Church bishop administering confirmation in the 14th century

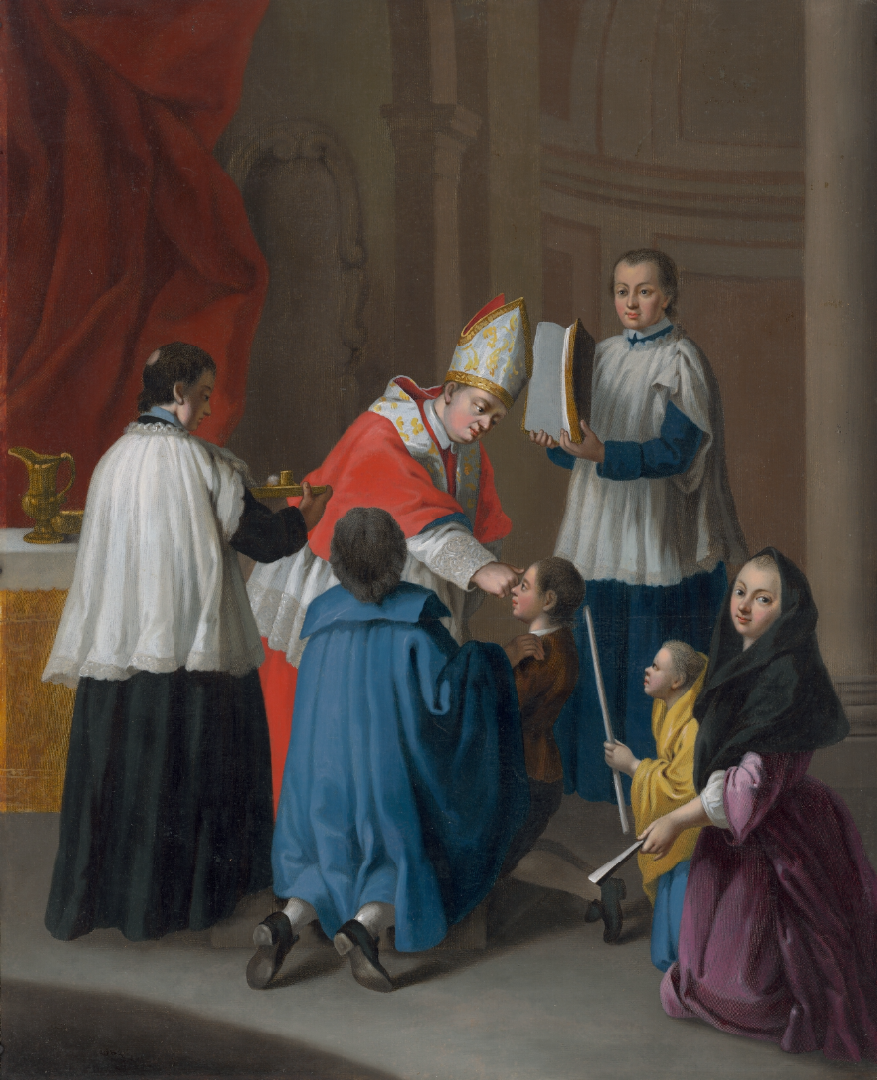
The sacrament of confirmation by Pietro Longhi

Confirmation is one of the seven sacraments, and specifically one of the three sacraments of initiation into the Catholic Church, the other two being baptism and first communion. Some practices in relation to confirmation differ between the Latin Church and the Eastern Catholic Churches.

== Description ==
The Catechism of the Catholic Church states:

It is evident from its celebration that the effect of the sacrament of Confirmation is the special outpouring of the Holy Spirit as once granted to the apostles on the day of Pentecost ... Recall then that you have received the spiritual seal, the spirit of wisdom and understanding, the spirit of right judgment and courage, the spirit of knowledge and reverence, the spirit of holy fear in God's presence. Guard what you have received. God the Father has marked you with his sign; Christ the Lord has confirmed you and has placed his pledge, the Spirit, in your hearts.

The Catechism sees the account in the Acts of the Apostles 8:14–17 as a scriptural basis for confirmation as a sacrament distinct from Baptism:

Now when the apostles, who were in Jerusalem, had heard that Samaria had received the word of God, they sent unto them Peter and John. Who, when they were come down, prayed for them, that they might receive the Holy Spirit. For he was not as yet come upon any of them; but they were only baptized in the name of the Lord Jesus. Then they laid their hands upon them, and they received the Holy Spirit.

== Latin Church ==
In the Latin Church, the sacrament is to be conferred on the faithful above the age of discretion (generally taken to be about 7), unless the Episcopal Conference has decided on a different age, or there is danger of death or, in the judgment of the minister, a grave reason suggests otherwise.

A revision to the service of confirmation was directed by the Second Vatican Council, so that "the intimate connection which this sacrament has with the whole of Christian initiation [could be] more clearly set forth". A Latin edition of the revised Ordo Confirmationis ("Order of Confirmation") was published in 1969. An initial English translation published shortly afterwards and a new version was published for use in England and Wales in January 2016.

The 1983 Code of Canon law states (canon 882): "The ordinary minister of confirmation is a bishop; a presbyter provided with this faculty in virtue of universal law or the special grant of the competent authority also confers this sacrament validly."

=== Age ===
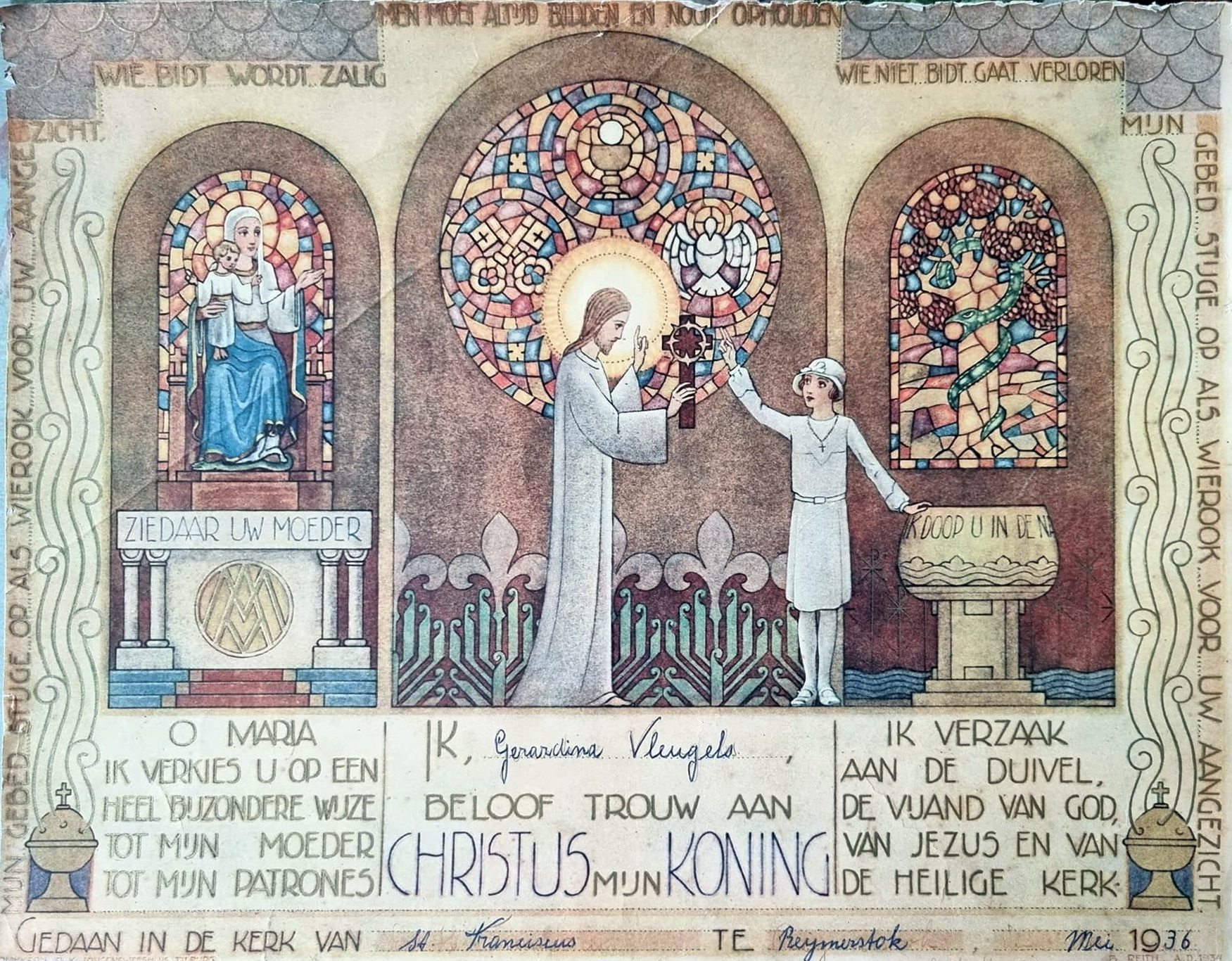
Certificate of confirmation of faith of 12-year old Gerardina Vleugels in Reijmerstok, Netherlands (1936)

Two synods held in England during the thirteenth century differed over whether confirmation had to be administered within one year after birth, or within three years. Confirmation became a much more important rite when concerns about understanding and faith grew, in particular following the Reformation. After the Fourth Lateran Council, Communion, which continued to be given only after confirmation, was to be administered only on reaching the age of reason. Some time after the 13th century, the age of confirmation and Communion began to be delayed further, from seven, to twelve and to fifteen. The 1917 Code of Canon Law, while recommending that confirmation be delayed until about seven years of age, allowed it be given at an earlier age. Only on 30 June 1932 was official permission given to change the traditional order of the three sacraments of Christian initiation: the Sacred Congregation for the Sacraments then allowed, where necessary, that confirmation be administered after first Holy Communion. This novelty, originally seen as exceptional, became more and more the accepted practice. Thus, in the mid-20th century, confirmation began to be seen as an occasion for professing personal commitment to the faith on the part of someone approaching adulthood.

However, the Catechism of the Catholic Church, §1308, warns: "Although Confirmation is sometimes called the 'sacrament of Christian maturity,' we must not confuse adult faith with the adult age of natural growth, nor forget that the baptismal grace is a grace of free, unmerited election and does not need 'ratification' to become effective."

On the canonical age for confirmation in the Latin Church of the Catholic Church, the present (1983) Code of Canon Law, which maintains unaltered the rule in the 1917 Code, specifies that the sacrament is to be conferred on the faithful at about 7-18, unless the episcopal conference has decided on a different age, or there is a danger of death or, in the judgement of the minister, a grave reason suggests otherwise (canon 891 of the Code of Canon Law). The 1983 Code prescribes the age of discretion also for the sacraments of Penance and first Holy Communion.

Since the Second Vatican Council, the setting of a later age, e.g. mid-teens in the United States, early teens in Ireland and Britain, has been abandoned in some places in favour of restoring the traditional order of the three sacraments of Christian initiation. Even in those countries where the episcopal conference has set a later age as normal, a bishop may not refuse to confer the sacrament on younger children who request it, provided they are baptized, have the use of reason, are suitably instructed and are properly disposed and able to renew the baptismal promises.

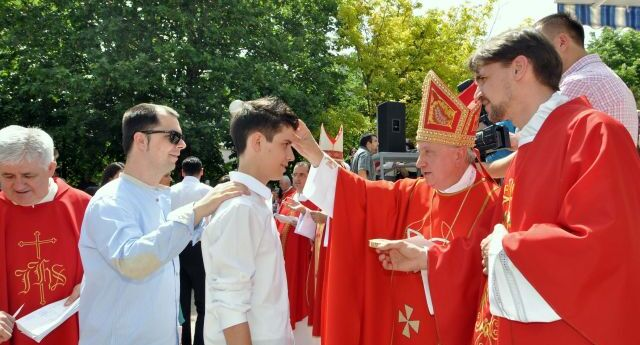
A Bishop anoints a young adult by using oil of chrism

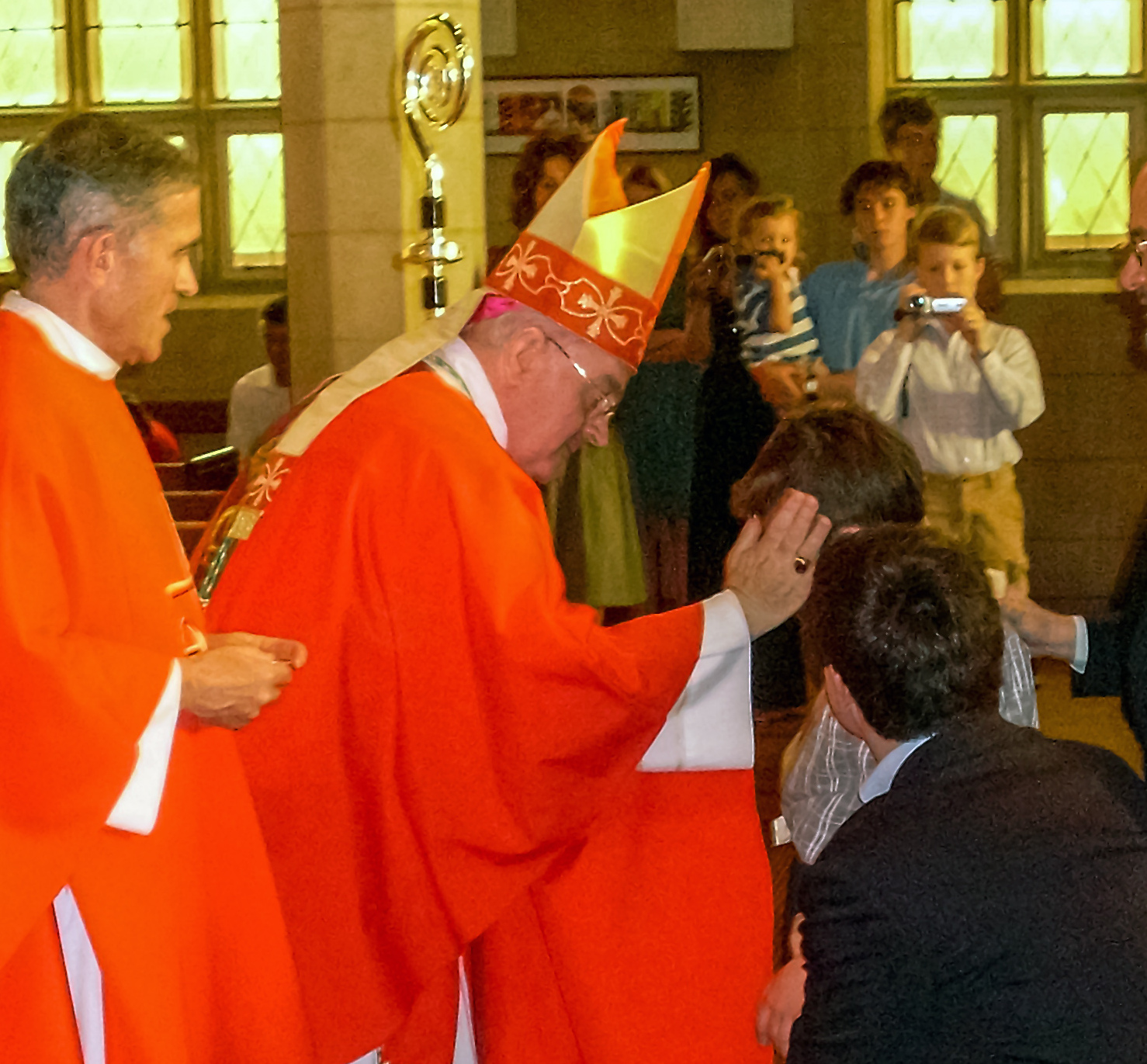
Bishop Elliott of Melbourne anointing a boy during a 2008 confirmation service

== Eastern Churches ==
The Chrismation with holy Myron is what confirmation is called in Eastern Catholic Churches. The canons concerning this practice are the can. 692-697 of the Code of Canons of the Eastern Churches. In Eastern Catholicism, priests are those who normally administer the Chrismation with holy Myron, and this sacrament can be administered conjointly with baptism. The Second Vatican Council confirmed and re-established the ancient practice according to which "priests validly confer this sacrament, using chrism blessed by a patriarch or a bishop". Unlike in the Latin Church, in Eastern Catholicism the sacrament does not require the anointing to be made by the imposition of the hand.

== Imagery ==
The "soldier of Christ" imagery, which remains valid but is downplayed if seen as part of the once common idea of confirmation as a "sacrament of maturity", was used as far back as 350 by Cyril of Jerusalem. In this connection, the touch on the cheek that the bishop gave while saying "Pax tecum" (Peace be with you) to the person he had just confirmed was interpreted in the Roman Pontifical as a slap, a reminder to be brave in spreading and defending the faith: "Deinde leviter eum in maxilla caedit, dicens: Pax tecum" (Then he strikes him lightly on the cheek, saying: Peace be with you) (cf. the knightly custom of the accolade). When, in application of the Second Vatican Council's Constitution on the Sacred Liturgy, the confirmation rite was revised in 1971, mention of this gesture was omitted. However, the French and Italian translations, which indicate that the bishop should accompany the words "Peace be with you" with "a friendly gesture" (French text) or "the sign of peace" (Italian text), explicitly allow a gesture such as the touch on the cheek, to which they restore its original meaning. This is in accord with the Introduction to the Rite of Confirmation, which indicates that an episcopal conference may decide "to introduce a different manner for the minister to give the sign of peace after the anointing, either to each individual or to all the newly confirmed together."

== See also ==
- Seven gifts of the Holy Spirit
- Rite of passage
