= Spiritus Domini =

Spiritus Domini is a Latin expression which literally translates to "the Spirit of the Lord". It can refer to:

- a Latin name of the Holy Spirit in Christianity
- Spiritus Domini, a 1987 ecclesiastical letter of John Paul II about Alphonsus Liguori
- Spiritus Domini, a 2021 motu proprio of Pope Francis allowing women to join the instituted ministries of acolyte and lector
