= Marguerite Ogden Wilkinson =

Canadian-born American poet (1883–1928)

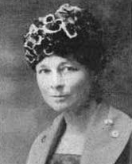
- .
- Born: November 14, 1883; Halifax, Nova Scotia, Canada
- Died: January 12, 1928 (aged 44)
- Education: Northwestern University
- Occupation: Poet
- Writing career
- Genre: Non-fiction

Marguerite Ogden Wilkinson (14 November 1883 – 12 January 1928) was an American poet.

She was born Marguerite Ogden Bigelow in 1883 in Halifax, Nova Scotia, the daughter of Nathan Kellogg Bigelow and Gertrude (Holmes) Bigelow. Her family moved to Evanston, Illinois while she was young, and she attended Northwestern University, where she started writing poetry. Wilkinson was a member of the university's Magazine Board and was editor of the annual issue of The Northwestern published by women of the university.

In 1909, she married James G. Wilkinson and moved with him to New Rochelle, New York, where he was a school principal.

She published several books of poetry, the most important being In Vivid Gardens, a collection of love poems. Other works included By a Western Wayside and The Passing of Mars. She was editor of the poetry page in the Los Angeles Graphic newspaper and the monthly Books and Authors, published in New York.

In 1928, she suffered a nervous breakdown. As part of her recovery, she took up swimming. In the winter of that year, Wilkinson drowned while swimming at Coney Island, New York.

== "For the guest room in a simple house" ==
She wrote "For the guest room in a simple house" which was published in the May 1909 issue of The Craftsman magazine. The words have been prominently posted in inns, namely at the Foyer Unitas in Rome.

Let the guest sojourning here know that in this home our life
is simple. What we cannot afford we do not offer, but what
good cheer we can give, we give gladly. We make no strife
for appearance's sake. We will not swerve from our path for you.
Know also, friend, that we live a life of labor,—that we may not
neglect it. Therefore, if, at times, we separate ourselves from you,
do you occupy yourself according to your heart's desire, being sure
that no slight to your presence is intended.
For, while you are with us, we would have you enjoy the blessings
of a home, health, love and freedom, and we pray that you may find
the final blessing of life,—peace.
We will not defer to you in opinion, or ask you to defer to us.
What you think you shall say, if you wish, without giving offense.
What we think we also say, believing that the crystal, Truth, has
many aspects, and that Love is large enough to encompass them all.
In this house you may meet those not of your own sort. They
may differ from you in nationality, birth, position, possessions,
education or affinity. But we are maintaining here a small part
of the world's great future democracy. We ask of you, therefore,
courtesy and tolerance for all alike.
And, on these stern terms, though you be young or old, proud or
plain, rich or poor, resting here you are a partaker of our love, and
we give you glad welcome.
