= Catholic laity =

Ordinary members of the Catholic Church who are not clergy

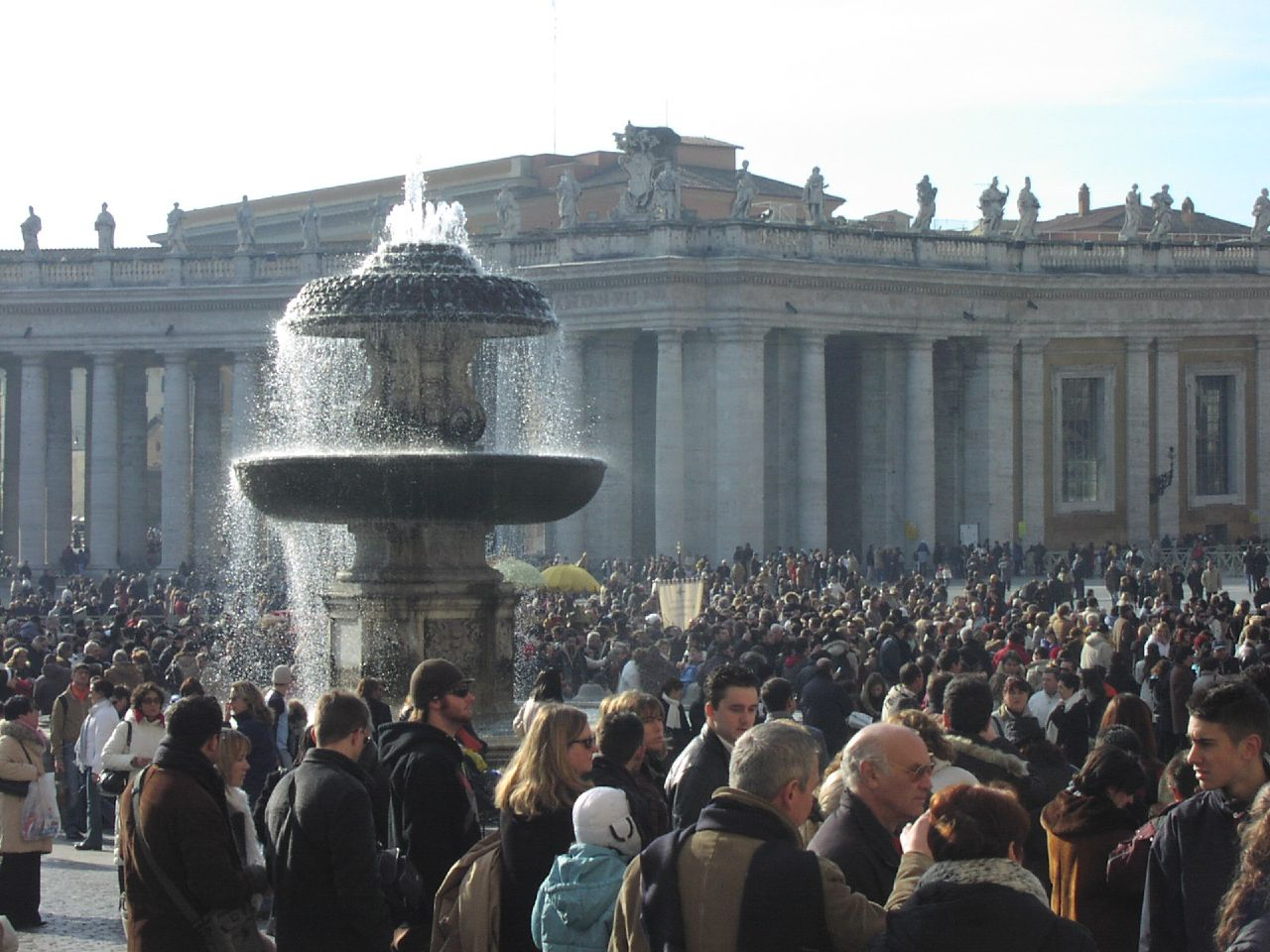
Laity in the St Peter's Square, Vatican City, Rome, Italy

Catholic laity are the ordinary members of the Catholic Church who are neither clergy nor recipients of Holy Orders or vowed to life in a religious order or congregation. Their mission, according to the Second Vatican Council, is to "sanctify the world".

The laity (individual laymen and women) form the vast majority of the estimated over one billion Catholics in the world.

The Catholic Church is served by the universal jurisdiction of the Holy See, headed by the Pope, and administered by the Roman Curia, while locally served by diocesan bishops. The Pope and the bishops in full communion with him are known collectively as the Catholic hierarchy, and are responsible for the supervision, management, and pastoral care of all members the Catholic Church, including clergy, religious, and laity. But since the Second Vatican Council of Bishops (1962–1965) the laity have emerged as a greater source of leadership in various aspects of the church's life; and its teaching on their equal call to holiness has led to greater recognition of their role in the church.

== The Roman Curia and the laity ==
The responsibilities of the Pontifical Council for the Laity, a dicastery of the Roman Curia based in Vatican City, were transferred to the newly established Dicastery for the Laity, Family and Life as of 1 September 2016.

The council "...assists the Pope in all matters concerning the contribution the lay faithful make to the life and mission of the Church, whether as individuals or through the various forms of association that have arisen and constantly arise within the Church".

This dicastery emerged from the Decree on the Lay Apostolate of the Second Vatican Council, Apostolicam Actuositatem. It was officially created by Pope Paul VI on 6 January 1967, with the motu proprio Catholicam Christi Ecclesiam.

== Canonical rights of the laity ==
Within the Catholic Church, the rights of the Catholic laity in regards to the Church are found in the Code of Canon Law. A new Code of Canon Law was promulgated in 1983, to incorporate teachings from the Second Vatican Council. In particular, Canons 224-231 of the 1983 Code outline the general and specific canonical rights of lay persons in the Catholic Church.

== Lay ministries ==
Prior to 1972, no lay liturgical ministries existed, only the minor orders and major orders. The minor orders were, in effect, the lower orders of the clerical state and were reserved for those preparing for the priesthood: Acolyte, Exorcist, Lector or reader, and Ostiarius or porter.

As a result of the reforms of the Second Vatican Council, on 15 August 1972 Pope Paul VI issued the motu proprio Ministeria quaedam which suppressed the minor orders and replaced them with two ministries, those of lector and acolyte. A major difference was: "Ministries may be assigned to lay Christians; hence they are no longer to be considered as reserved to candidates for the sacrament of orders."

The following are requirements for admission to the ministries:

- the presentation of a petition that has been freely made out and signed by the aspirant to the Ordinary (the bishop and, in clerical institutes, the major superior) who has the right to accept the petition;
- a suitable age and special qualities to be determined by the conference of bishops;
- a firm will to give faithful service to God and to the Christian people.

The ministries are conferred by the Ordinary through the liturgical rites De institutione lectoris and De institutione acolythi as revised by the Apostolic See.

An interval, determined by the Holy See or the conferences of bishops, shall be observed between the conferring of the ministries of reader and acolyte whenever more than one ministry is conferred on the same person."

It was originally the case that the instituted ministries of lector and acolyte were reserved to men. In 2021 Pope Francis issued the motu proprio “Spiritus Domini”, which changed canon 230 § 1 of the Code of Canon Law to allow both men and women to be instituted in these ministries.

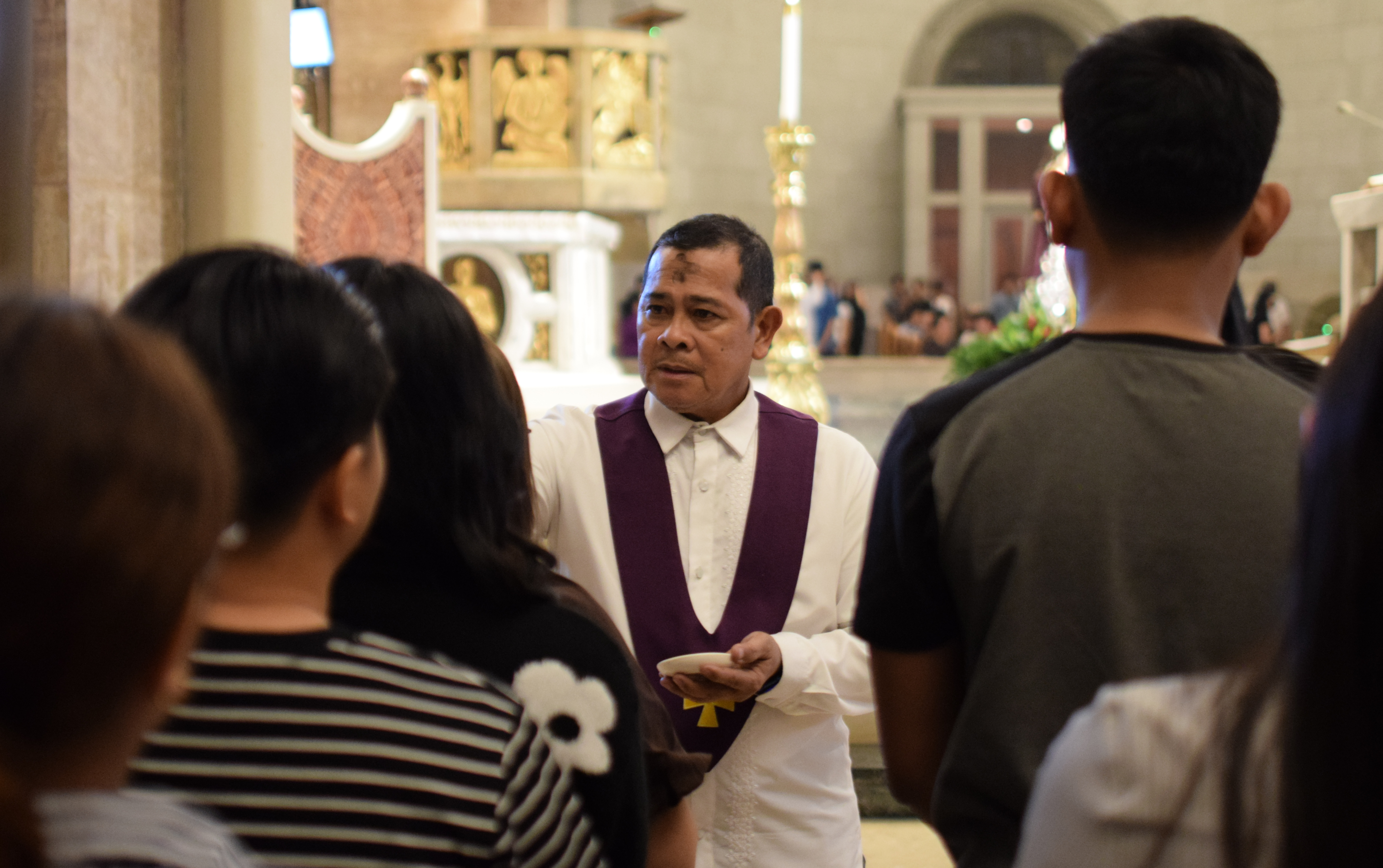
A lay minister in the Philippines draws crosses of ashes on massgoers during Ash Wednesday.

In place of instituted ministries, there is widespread use of commissioned or temporarily designated readers, altar servers and extraordinary ministers of Holy Communion, which can be undertaken by both men and women.

Conditions for the extension of these roles can be found in The General Instruction of the Roman Missal. In relation to readers, Instruction #101 says: "In the absence of an instituted lector, other laypersons may be commissioned to proclaim the readings from Sacred Scripture. They should be truly suited to perform this function and should receive careful preparation, so that the faithful by listening to the readings from the sacred texts may develop in their hearts a warm and living love for Sacred Scripture." As regards altar servers and extraordinary ministers of Holy Communion, Instruction #100 says: "In the absence of an instituted acolyte, lay ministers may be deputed to serve at the altar and assist the priest and the deacon; they may carry the cross, the candles, the thurible, the bread, the wine, and the water, and they may also be deputed to distribute Holy Communion as extraordinary ministers."

An option to institute the other minor orders was retained in this document, in that a Bishops Conference may request permission from the Apostolic See "if they judge the establishment of such offices in their region to be necessary or very useful because of special reasons. To these belong, for example, the ministries of porter, exorcist, catechist, as well as others to be conferred on those who are dedicated to works of charity, where this ministry had not been assigned to deacons."

== Lay councils ==
=== Powers and influence of the laity ===
The 1983 Code of Canon Law does not permit the laity to have any kind of executive or juridical powers in Ecclesiastical affairs. This curtails the extent of influence the laity has over how the Church is governed on a day-to-day basis. However, lay experts and advisors were appointed to participate during the deliberations of the Second Vatican Council. After the Council members of the Laity were routinely appointed to sit on Commissions & Committees established at every level – Curial, Bishops Conference, Diocesan, Deanery, and Parish. Each parish is advised to have a parish council and a finance council of laypersons which are advisory to the pastor.

=== National Council for Lay Associations (England and Wales) ===
The National Council for Lay Associations (NCLA) was the idea of the late Monsignor Derek Worlock, who later became Archbishop of Liverpool, England. It became one of the Consultative Bodies of the Bishops' Conference in England and Wales and was formed from all the large Catholic lay organizations. The NCLA was initially called the National Lay Apostolic Group and was formed after the first World Congress for the Apostolate of the Laity held in Rome in October 1951. In 2003 the NCLA celebrated its 50th birthday with a Golden Jubilee Mass in Salford Cathedral. The NCLA today is a consultative body to the Catholic Bishops Conference of England and Wales.

The following members form the association:

- Catholic Men's Society (CMS),
- Catholic Association Teachers, Schools and Colleges
- St Vincent de Paul (SVP)
- Union of Catholic Mothers (UCM)
- Catholic Women's League (CWC)
- Knights of St Columba (KSC)
- National Board of Catholic Women (NBCW)
- Ascent Movement
- National Justice and Peace
- Newman Association
- CAFOD
- Legion of Mary
- Catholic People's Weeks
- Catholic Medical Association
- Secular Franciscans.

The NCLA is an active member of ELF (European Lay Forum).

=== The National Council of the Laity (Venezuela) ===
The National Council of the Laity (Consejo Nacional de Laicos) in Venezuela routinely issued statements and press releases often criticising the policies of former President Hugo Chávez.

=== Uganda National Catholic Council of Lay Apostolate (UNCCLA) ===
This is a body that brings together the Laity in the Catholic Church in Uganda who are estimated at 34.1 million in the country making it around 39.3% of the total population in 2014.

Under patronage of St. Charles Lwanga, Uganda National Catholic Council of Lay Apostolate (UNCCLA) is a body that brings together in a representative manner Lay Apostolate Associations and Movements, and Councils to foster a better organised and dynamic apostolate in Uganda while serving as a link, avenue and channel for information and communication between Lay Apostolate Associations and Movements, and Councils and between these and other official organs within the Church in Uganda and the Universal Church.

=== The Council of the Catholic Lay Apostolate Organizations of Korea ===
The Council of the Catholic Lay Apostolate Organizations of Korea, formerly The Catholic Lay Apostolate Council of Korea, was renamed during the 2010 Autumn General Assembly of the Catholic Bishops' Conference of Korea. This was ratified at the 44th Ordinary General Meeting of the Council which was held at the Catholic Center in Myeongdong, Seoul, on 19 February 2011.

== Lay Congresses ==
=== 1950s ===
Pope Pius XII addressed an initial "convention of laymen representing all nations on the promotion of the apostolate" in October 1951, and a second, similar, convention was held in October 1957.

=== The National Pastoral Congress (England and Wales) ===
Archbishop Derek Worlock, supported by the late Archbishop of Westminster Cardinal Basil Hume, convened the National Pastoral Congress in Liverpool, England, in 1980. The Congress consisted of some two thousand lay people. The Congress deliberated on issues that the gathering agreed were of particular concern to lay Catholics in England and Wales at that time. The results of these deliberations were drawn together in a document entitled "The Easter People". This document was very publicly rejected by Pope John Paul II when it was presented to him by Cardinal Hume and Archbishop Worlock in Rome, Italy, in 1980. There has not been another National Pastoral Congress since this time in England and Wales.

== Lay organizations ==
There are many thousands of Catholic lay organisations existing at a local, diocesan, national / bishops conference or international level. They cover the whole spectrum of Catholic lay life, from their faith and social action to the professions in which they work.

The majority have sought and been given backing by the appropriate ecclesiastical authority. However, others have invoked the right contained in Canon 215 to form a Catholic Association without ecclesiastical approval. In these circumstances the only prescription on them is that they cannot use the term "Catholic" in their name (Can. 216).

The Pontifical Council for the Laity is the body responsible for approving those Catholic Associations that exist at an international level.

The structure of some Religious Orders allows for lay branches to be associated with them. These are sometimes referred to as Third Orders.

Some of the best known Catholic lay organizations are Knights of Columbus, Knights of Columba, Catenians, and Knights of Malta. There are also many lay Catholic guilds and associations representing a whole range of professions. These include the Catholic Police Guild, Holy Name Society (NYPD), the Association of Catholic Nurses, the Guild of Catholic Doctors, the Catholic Physicians Guild, the Catholic Association of Performing Arts (UK), and the Catholic Actors Guild of America.

In the Archdiocese of Los Angeles, the Queen of Angels Foundation was established in 2011 by Mark Anchor Albert. The Foundation, an association of lay faithful dedicated to fostering devotion to Mary, Mother of Jesus, is a volunteer group of lay men and women who "...strive together in a common endeavor to foster a more perfect life for themselves and their community by promoting reverence for the Blessed Virgin Mary, in whose name, as Our Lady of the Angels, the City and Archdiocese of Los Angeles were founded..." and whom Catholics revere as Queen of Heaven and Empress of the Americas. The Queen of Angels Foundation is the official sponsor of the Archdiocese of Los Angeles' annual celebration of the City of Los Angeles' founding. This Votive Mass & Grand Marian Procession take place in Downtown Los Angeles on the last Saturday of August.

== Personal prelatures ==
Organisations such as Opus Dei and Miles Jesu are ostensibly Catholic lay organisations which are overseen by clergy associated and / or affiliated with them. The structure of these organisations is termed a "personal prelature".

== Lay advocacy groups ==
In recent years many lay advocacy groups have formed, some in response to the clerical sex abuse crisis.

Reforms advocated by these groups would include:

- the binding of the Catholic Hierarchy to a universal and comprehensive system of transparency and accountability relating to their governance of the Church;
- the mandatory empowerment of the laity to a degree of oversight and scrutiny at every level of the Church – local, diocesan, provincial, national / bishops conference, international, dicastery;
- automatic consultative and collaborative rights for the laity at every level of the Church;
- increased lay access to and involvement with ministry within the Church;
- freedom of speech and an end of censorship.

== Lay media ==
=== Web content ===
Lay Catholics have contributed to Catholic media online in such avenues as blogs, online columns, and newspapers. The Vatican hosted a conference of bloggers on 2 May 2011, which was sponsored jointly by the Pontifical Council for Culture and the Pontifical Council for Social Communications. One hundred and fifty bloggers were invited from across the world. Richard Rouse, an English layman who works for the Pontifical Council for Culture, has stated that this meeting was not held in any attempt by the Vatican to control Catholic blogs. He has also stated that there will not be another Vatican Blogmeet, but individual dioceses may hold similar conferences.

=== Lay newspapers ===
There are many Catholic newspapers and periodicals produced around the world by lay Catholics, which are independent of the Church hierarchy. Examples in the United Kingdom are The Catholic Herald and The Tablet. In the United States the Catholic Reporter is entirely a work of the laity and the National Catholic Register, a subsidiary of EWTN, is run by laypersons. Secular newspapers such as The Boston Globe and The Daily Telegraph are also heavy in Catholic content.

=== Lay spokespeople ===
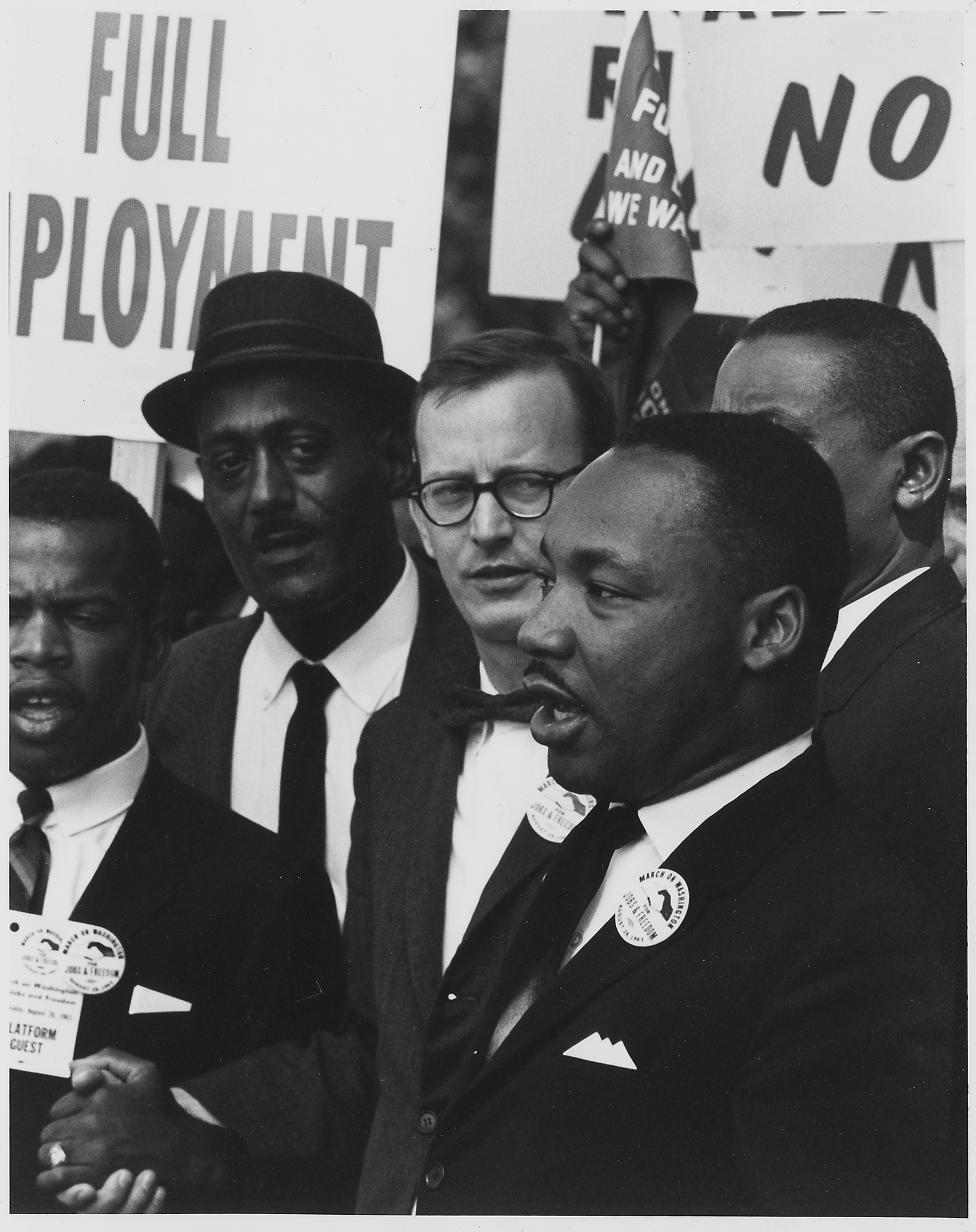
Mathew Ahmann, Catholic layman and speaker during the March on Washington, behind Martin Luther King Jr.

Recently, laypeople have started to act as public spokespersons for the Church in both official and unofficial capacities. One such example was the foundation of Catholic Voices in preparation for the visit of Pope Benedict XVI to the United Kingdom in 2010. The group has since been made a permanent part of their work and expanded to other countries. Primarily focusing on young Catholic professionals, it provides them with training to talk to the media about events happening within the Catholic Church. It has been replicated in Spain and in Germany where it is known as Catholic Faces. Other countries where interest in such an effort has emerged are Chile, Colombia, Ecuador, Mexico, Costa Rica, and the United States.

== Clericalism ==
Clericalism might be described as any attempt to exaggerate the importance of the priesthood as a focus of power and privilege. It was described by a bishop at Vatican II as one of the three main evils that had typified the Church in the previous centuries. Some would say that it accompanies a new wave of traditionalism that grew during the pontificate of John-Paul II. In April 2011, during a conference in Milwaukee, United States, on the clergy child sex abuse scandal, the Archbishop of Dublin Diarmuid Martin said: "There are signs of a new clericalism, which may even at times be ably veiled behind appeals for deeper spirituality or for more orthodox theological positions." Martin added that he planned to require all seminarians to "carry out some part of their formation with lay people so that they can establish mature relationships with men and women and not develop any sense of their priesthood giving them a special social position."

Pope Francis has endeavored in many ways to lift up the laity in the Church, with "continual blasting of clericalism and his references to the “one, holy People of God'." He declared that the "hour of the laity" has arrived and decried clericalism as rife in the Church, saying that it "leads to the functionalization of the laity, From the start of his papacy Francis referred to the laity as "missionary disciples" with an apostolate of their own, submissive to but not requiring the direction of the hierarchy.

Clericalism has been viewed as a barrier to improving lay rights and greater access to positions of supervision, oversight, and administration in the Church, as well as to increased involvement in Church ministry. A classic example of clericalism comes from Monsignor George Talbot in 1867, in his critique of the position of John Henry Newman in his article "On Consulting the Faithful in Matters of Doctrine", which was published in the Rambler in July 1859. Talbot is quoted as saying to Henry Edward Manning, Archbishop of Westminster:

Dr. Newman is the most dangerous man in England, and you will see that he will make use of the laity against Your Grace. You must not be afraid of him. ...What is the province of the laity? To hunt, to shoot, to entertain. These matters they understand, but to meddle with ecclesiastical matters they have no right at all, and this affair of Newman is a matter purely ecclesiastical.

John Henry Newman was a proponent of increased Catholic lay involvement in the life of the Church. After publishing "On Consulting..." Newman was looked upon with grave suspicion and distrust by many of the Catholic hierarchy in England and Wales, and in Rome where Talbot had worked in the Papal Curia. Newman was made a Cardinal by Pope Leo XIII in 1879; Talbot, whose "notorious want of judgment" was noted by the biographer C. Butler, died in an asylum at Passy near Paris in 1886. Talbot had asked Newman "Who are the laity?" to which Newman responded that "the Church would look foolish without them."

== See also ==
- Associations of the faithful
- Catechism of the Catholic Church
- Catholic Catechist
- Index of Vatican City-related articles
- Popular piety
- Lay ecclesial ministry
- List of Ecclesial movements
- Universal call to holiness
- Vocational Discernment in the Catholic Church
- Queen of Angels Foundation
