= Catholic minister (disambiguation) =

Catholic minister refers to a minister of the Catholic Church.

== See also ==
- Anglican minister
- Christian minister
