= Minister (Catholic Church) =

General role in the Catholic Church

In the Catholic Church, the term minister is used with various meanings. Most commonly, the word refers to a person, either lay or ordained, who is commissioned to perform some act on behalf of the Catholic Church. It is not a particular office or rank of clergy, as is the case in some other Christian organisations; rather, minister may be used as a collective term for vocational or professional pastoral leaders including clergy (bishops, deacons, priests) and non-clergy (theologians and lay ecclesial ministers). It is also used in reference to the canonical and liturgical administration of sacraments, as part of some offices, and with reference to the exercise of the lay apostolate.

== Lay ministers ==
The Catholic Church calls people to the responsible stewardship of their time and talent in support of the Catholic Church. This often takes the form of volunteering for a specific lay ministry, most of which are liturgical, catechetical, or involved in pastoral care and social justice.

Liturgical lay ministries include lectors (ministers of the Word) who proclaim scriptural (the Bible) passages during the Liturgy of the Word, altar servers and acolytes who assist the presider at the altar, cantors and music ministers who lead the singing, extraordinary ministers of Holy Communion who serve during Mass or who take Holy Communion to the sick and homebound, and ushers or ministers of hospitality who direct the seating and procession of the assembly.

Catechetical lay ministries include catechists (Sunday school teachers and teachers at Catholic schools), dismissal leaders (ministers who lead RCIA catechumens on Sundays), retreat leaders, youth group leaders, and Scout religious emblems counselors.

== Ecclesial ministers ==
Some persons within the church receive formation, usually including graduate studies in theology or divinity, and then exercising some leadership role in the community. In common usage, when someone refers to a "minister of the church" they are referring to any one of these "professional" ministers.

The Catholic Church identifies five ecclesial vocations, three of which are ordained. Theologians and lay ecclesial ministers are not necessarily ordained, while bishops, presbyters, and deacons are ordained. While only the latter are considered clergy by the Catholic Church, all are considered ministers in the professional and vocational sense.

== Ministers of the sacraments ==
The other kind of minister in Catholic parlance is a person who administers a sacrament, meaning that he or she is a conduit of sacramental grace. This is not an office or position but instead a function that different kinds of people may perform, depending on the sacrament. There are two kinds of ministers in this sense. The ordinary minister of a sacrament, who is the standard or normal minister of that sacrament, has the spiritual power to administer it (i.e., the person's sacrament is valid), but not necessarily the canonical authority to administer it (i.e., a licit sacrament). Thus, a bishop who consecrates another bishop without pontifical mandate exercises illicitly the spiritual power to consecrate him. While bishops, priests and deacons are ordinary ministers of Holy Communion, only someone who has been validly ordained as a priest is a minister of the Eucharist. If a priest is, for some reason, debarred and yet celebrates the Eucharist, he does so illicitly (i.e. against canon law), but the Eucharist is still valid. However, in the case of the sacrament of Reconciliation (the Sacrament of Penance), although the priest is the minister, the only minister, since there are no extraordinary ministers of this sacrament, he must have been granted by the law itself or by a competent authority the faculty to celebrate this sacrament validly for the person to whom he imparts absolution.

An extraordinary minister of a sacrament is someone, other than an ordinary minister, officially authorized to administer a sacrament by the law itself (as an instituted acolyte is an extraordinary minister of Holy Communion) or by being deputed for this purpose.

Below is a table outlining each sacrament, its ordinary ministers, and its extraordinary ministers (if any), with stipulations regarding its exercise by extraordinary ministers in parentheses.

Ministers of Sacraments in the Latin liturgical rites of the Catholic Church
Sacrament	Ordinary ministers	Extraordinary ministers
Baptism	any clergy	in the absence of clergy, a catechist or other person designated by the local ordinary in emergencies, any person with the right intention, even if not baptised (in other circumstances illicit but valid)
Confirmation	bishop	priests who are equivalent in law to a diocesan bishop for their subjects, or who legitimately baptise or receive into the Church an adult, or who are acting in danger of death for the person being confirmed or who have been specifically granted the faculty by the diocesan bishop (invalid if administered by other priests or by persons who are not priests)
Eucharist (consecration)	bishop or priest	none; always invalid if attempted by others
Distribution of Holy Communion	clergy (including deacons)	instituted acolyte (licit when not enough or no clergy are available) other laity deputed for the purpose (licit when not enough or no clergy or instituted acolytes available)
Reconciliation	bishop or priest	none; invalid if done by a layperson or by a priest without faculties (which the law provides for any priest absolving someone who is in danger of death)
Anointing of the Sick	bishop or priest	none; invalid if done by anyone else
Holy Orders (bishop)	bishop	none; licit only by papal mandate and, if there are no co-consecrators, by papal dispensation, but still valid without these authorisations
Holy Orders (priest and deacon)	bishop	none; licit only if the bishop is ordaining his own subjects who are of the same rite or those who have been given dimissorial letters, and only if the bishop is ordaining in his own territory or with the permission of the local bishop
Holy Matrimony	husband and wife	none; invalid if contracted other than before the local ordinary or parish priest or a priest or deacon delegated by them and before two witnesses (some exceptions to this condition are envisaged in canon law)

== Instituted ministries ==
The offices of lector (reader) and acolyte were previously minor orders; with Ministeria quaedam (1972; taking effect on 1 January 1973), Pope Paul VI abolished minor orders and the subdiaconate, creating "instituted ministries" in their stead. Since 2021, in the Latin Church, both men and women can become instituted lectors and acolytes, and catechist has been turned into an instituted ministry and is available for both sexes.

=== Instituted lector and acolyte ===
While the approved English translations of the liturgical books of the Catholic Church's Roman Rite use the terms "instituted acolytes" and "instituted lectors" some translations refer to them as "installed". For example, the translation on the Vatican's website of the 2019 motu proprio Aperuit illis has "Bishops could celebrate the Rite of Installation of Lectors or a similar commissioning of readers".

In 1972, an official part of the Pontificale Romanum containing a liturgical ceremony for the installation of instituted lectors and instituted acolytes, was published.

The 1984 liturgical book Ceremonial of Bishops, says that in ceremonies where are bishop presides it is fitting that instituted acolytes and instituted lectors carry out their functions – rather than by those who have not been instituted. The 2004 Congregation for Bishops guideline Apostolorum Successores, n. 113, says: "The bishop should promote the ministries of lector and acolyte, which may be conferred upon male laypersons".

A role of the instituted lector is to proclaim the readings (except the Gospel) in liturgical celebrations. The instituted lector should do this even if ministers of higher rank are present. Other lay people do these readings at Mass in "the absence of an instituted lector".

In January 2021, with the motu proprio Spiritus Domini, Pope Francis changed the canon law of the Latin Church so that both men and women could become instituted lectors and acolytes. Previously, only men were allowed to be instituted in those ministries.

=== Instituted catechist ===
In May 2021, Pope Francis created the instituted ministry of lay catechist with the motu proprio Antiquum ministerium. In December 2021, the Congregation for Divine Worship and the Discipline of the Sacraments published a liturgical rite for the installation of instituted lay catechists.

On 23 January 2022, Pope Francis installed for the first time women as instituted lectors and catechists. On this day, Pope Francis held a ceremony during which he installed six women as instituted lectors, and three women as instituted catechists, along with some men.

== See also ==
- Christianity in the 1st century#Ministry and eschatological expectations
