= Female altar servers =

Role in Christian ministries

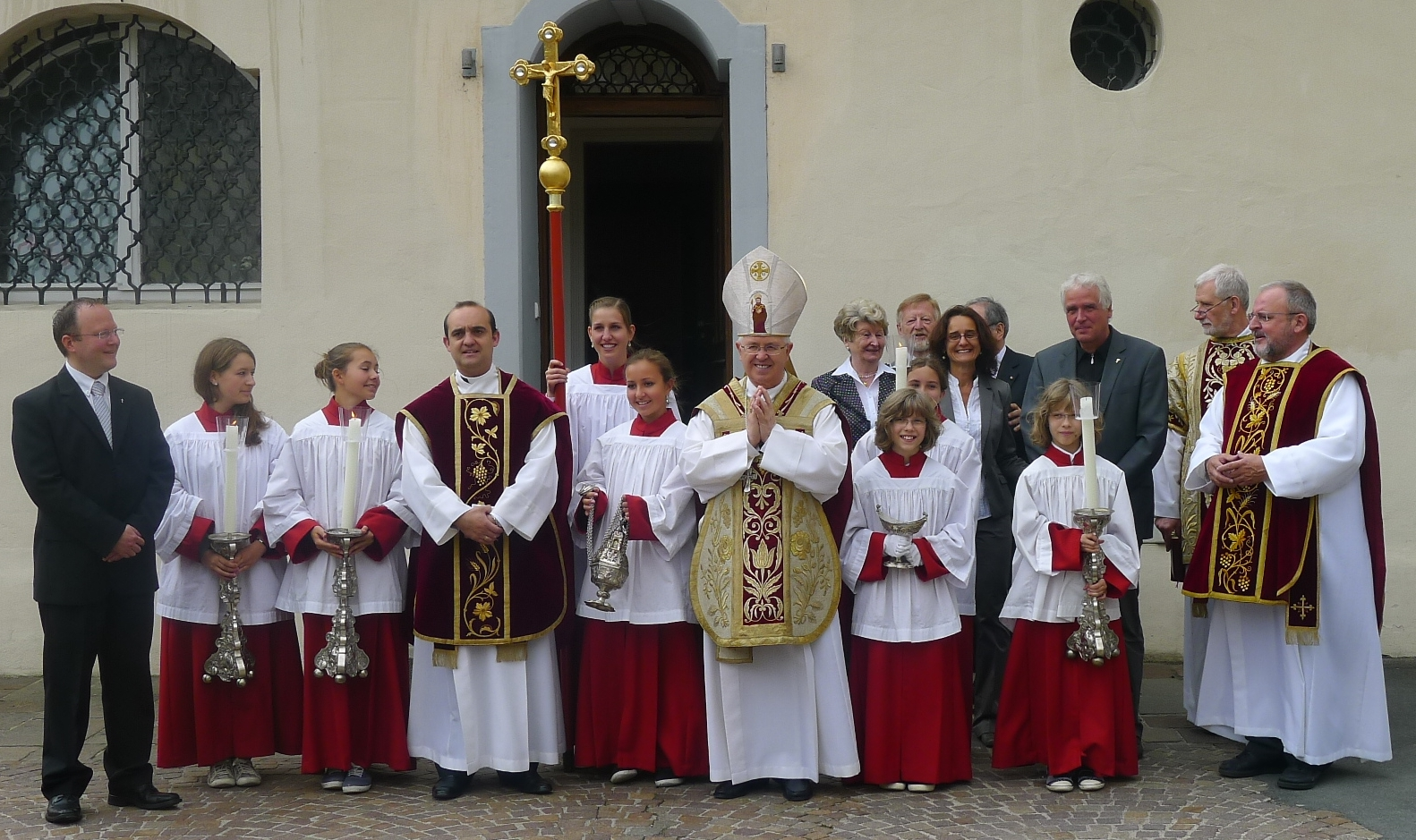
Exclusively female altar servers in the Archdiocese of Santiago de Compostela

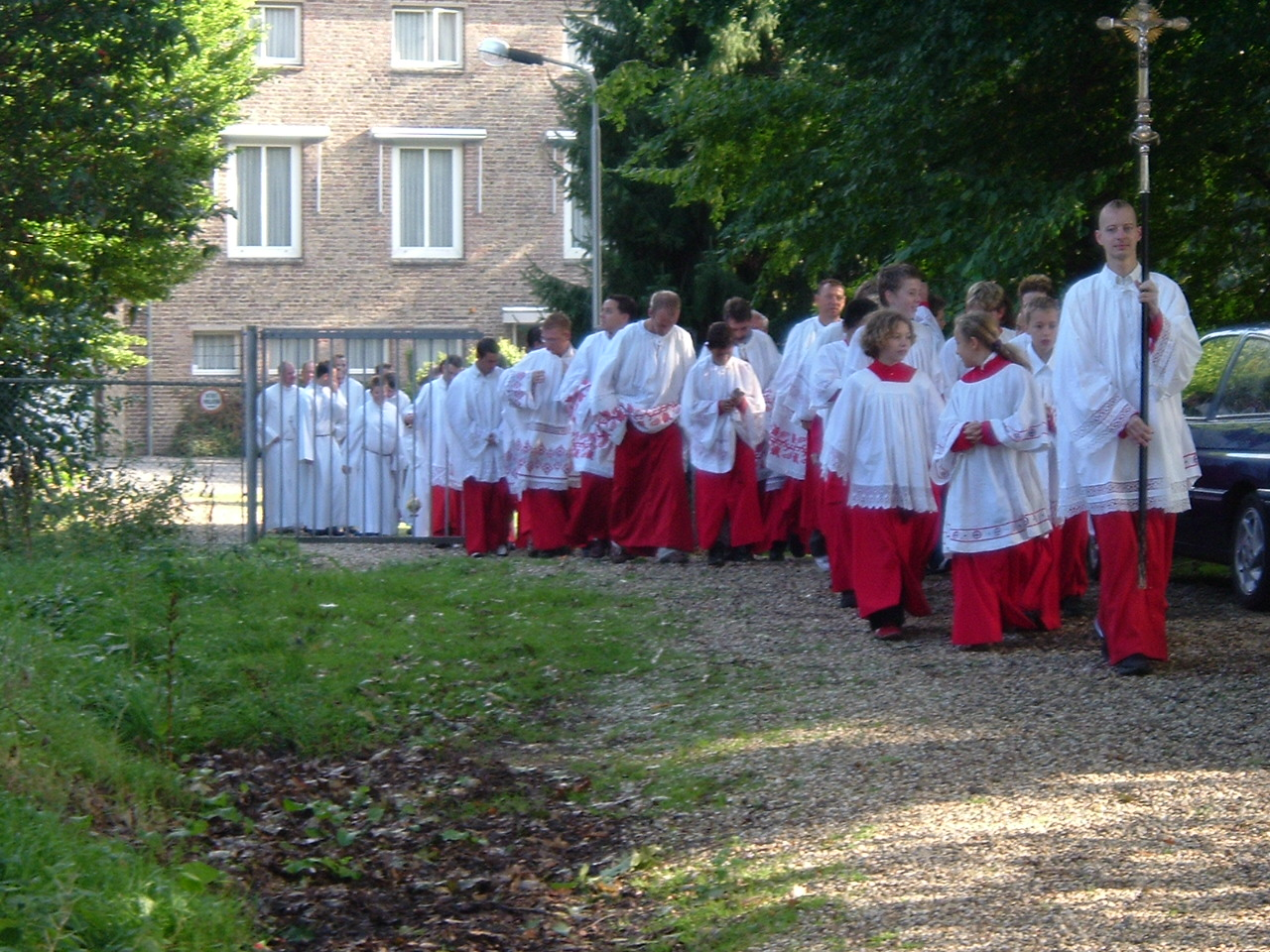
Men and women, boys and girls, vested as altar servers and processing to the Church of the Saviour, Groningen

The development of the ministry of altar server has a long history. By the early Middle Ages, some of these ministries were formalized under the term "minor orders" and (along with the diaconate) used as steps to priestly ordination. One of the minor orders was the office of acolyte. Altar servers are a substitute for an instituted acolyte.

In several though not all Christian Churches, women have traditionally been excluded from approaching the altar (located in the chancel) during the liturgy. Thus The Service Book of the Orthodox Church (English translation by Isabel Florence Hapgood) states that "no woman may enter the Sanctuary at any time". In the Roman Rite of the Catholic Church, the former rule was: "women may not enter [the sanctuary] at all". The normative practice within the Lutheran Churches permits both men and women to serve as altar servers (acolytes).

This did not exclude women, especially in convents of nuns, from entering the altar area at other times, for cleaning.

In Eastern Churches, women are further restricted by not being allowed inside the altar area and in several traditions even within the church building during their monthly periods.

== Practice by Christian denomination ==
=== Catholic Church ===
The decision on to whether to allow altar girls is dependent on the local Bishop of the Diocese in the Catholic Church.

==== Former practice ====
Formerly, it was forbidden to have women serving near the altar or anywhere in the chancel (infra cancellos), that is, they were prohibited from entering the altar area behind the altar rails during the liturgy. Although in some convents, the (female) nuns did in fact serve within the chancel.

The first Pope to denounce the practice of altar girls was Pope Gelasius, in the late 5th century he wrote to the Bishops of Lucania ordering them to stop the practice. More than 800 years later, Pope Innocent IV would likewise forbid the practice. Pope Benedict XIV wrote in the encyclical Allatae sunt, 26 July 1775, "Women should not dare to serve at the altar; they should be altogether refused this ministry", and stating it was an “evil practice”, a reaffirmation of the earlier teaching of Gelasius and Innocent.

With the practice of private Masses (Mass by a priest and one other person, usually offered for a deceased person), scandal was often seen as a reason not to have a woman or girl alone with a priest.

However, it has been customary in convents of women for nuns to perform the ministry of acolyte without being formally ordained to that minor order. This practice was used when the Council of Trent developed the seminary system where men would go to seminary for training to be a priest rather than study under a parish priest.

During the Second Vatican Council. The Church discussed whether lay women could be servers at mass, although the matter would ultimately remain unchanged. Later in 1980 the Catholic Church would reaffirm the 1917 Code of Canon Law which stated: "A woman is not to be the server at Mass except when a man is unavailable and for a just reason and provided that she give the responses from a distance and in no way approach the altar."

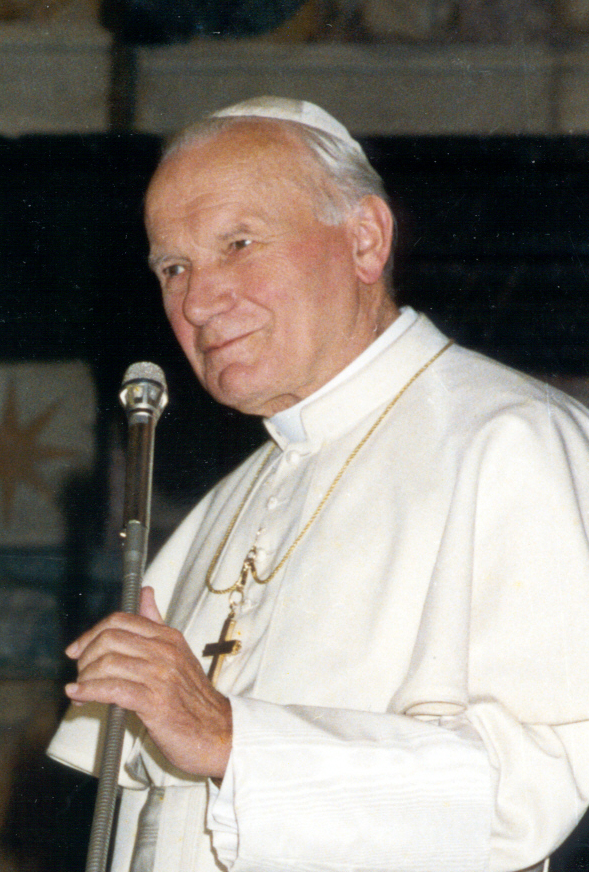
Pope John Paul II. During his pontificate canon law was changed to permit women to serve as altar servers (with the permission of the local Bishop).

In 1994, Pope John Paul II changed canon law, removing the church wide ban on allowing women and girls to serve as altar servers. The decision was devolved to Bishops, who could choose whether to allow or disallow girls to serve as altar servers, but overall removed the Church wide ban.

==== Changes since Vatican II ====
The 1983 Code of Canon Law, without distinguishing between male and female, said that "Lay persons can fulfill the function of lector in liturgical actions by temporary designation. All lay persons can also perform the functions of commentator or cantor, or other functions, according to the norm of law." Although that language did not explicitly authorize women to act as altar servers, many dioceses allowed women to act as altar servers.

The Holy See provided two clarifications in the 1990s. On 30 June 1992, the Pontifical Council for the Interpretation of Legislative Texts issued an authentic interpretation of that canon declaring that service at the altar is one of the "other functions" open to lay persons in general. On 15 March 1994, the Congregation for Divine Worship affirmed that both men and women may serve at the altar, that each bishop has the discretion to determine who may serve, and that "it will always be very appropriate to follow the noble tradition of having boys serve at the altar".

In the year 2021, Pope Francis, modified the Canon Law to state that all baptized persons, male and female, of the Catholic Church were allowed to lector and acolyte. Where women and girls already had the ability to exercise these functions "by temporary designation", he indicated their eligibility for these roles "on a stable basis".

===== Vatican and papal practice =====
Pope Benedict XVI had both male and female altar servers in Papal masses in London (2010), Berlin, and Freiburg (2011).

===== United States =====
In the United States the Diocese of Lincoln, Nebraska was the only diocese that did not allow female altar servers, after the only other diocese that did not, the Diocese of Arlington, ended its prohibition on female altar servers in 2006. However, the cathedral of the Diocese of Phoenix announced in August 2011 that women would not be allowed to serve at the altar.

In 2015, Cardinal Raymond Leo Burke, an American official of the Roman Curia, criticized the introduction of female altar servers as part of what he calls "radical feminism" and an unwelcome sign of the "feminization" of the Church. Burke says that it requires a "certain manly discipline to serve as an altar boy in service at the side of a priest, and most priests have their first deep experiences of the liturgy as altar boys. If we are not training young men as altar boys, giving them an experience of serving God in the liturgy, we should not be surprised that vocations have fallen dramatically."

=== Lutheran Churches ===
At present, the normative practice within the Lutheran Churches permits both men and women to serve as altar servers (acolytes).

The North American Lutheran Church (NALC) has always permitted both male altar servers and female altar servers. Both men and women are eligible for ordination into the pastorate in the North American Lutheran Church.

The Lutheran Church – Missouri Synod (LCMS) in 2004 affirmed that women can hold any congregational office that does not involve pastoral functions, officially permitting the presence of female altar servers. The presence of female altar servers has been criticized by certain clerics, such as Lutheran priests Evan Scamman and Larry Beane, who view the position of the acolyte as a possible prerequisite to holy orders, an office for which women are ineligible in the LCMS.

=== Anglican Churches ===
Within the Anglican tradition, the presence of male acolytes and female acolytes is typically the norm.

== Gallery ==
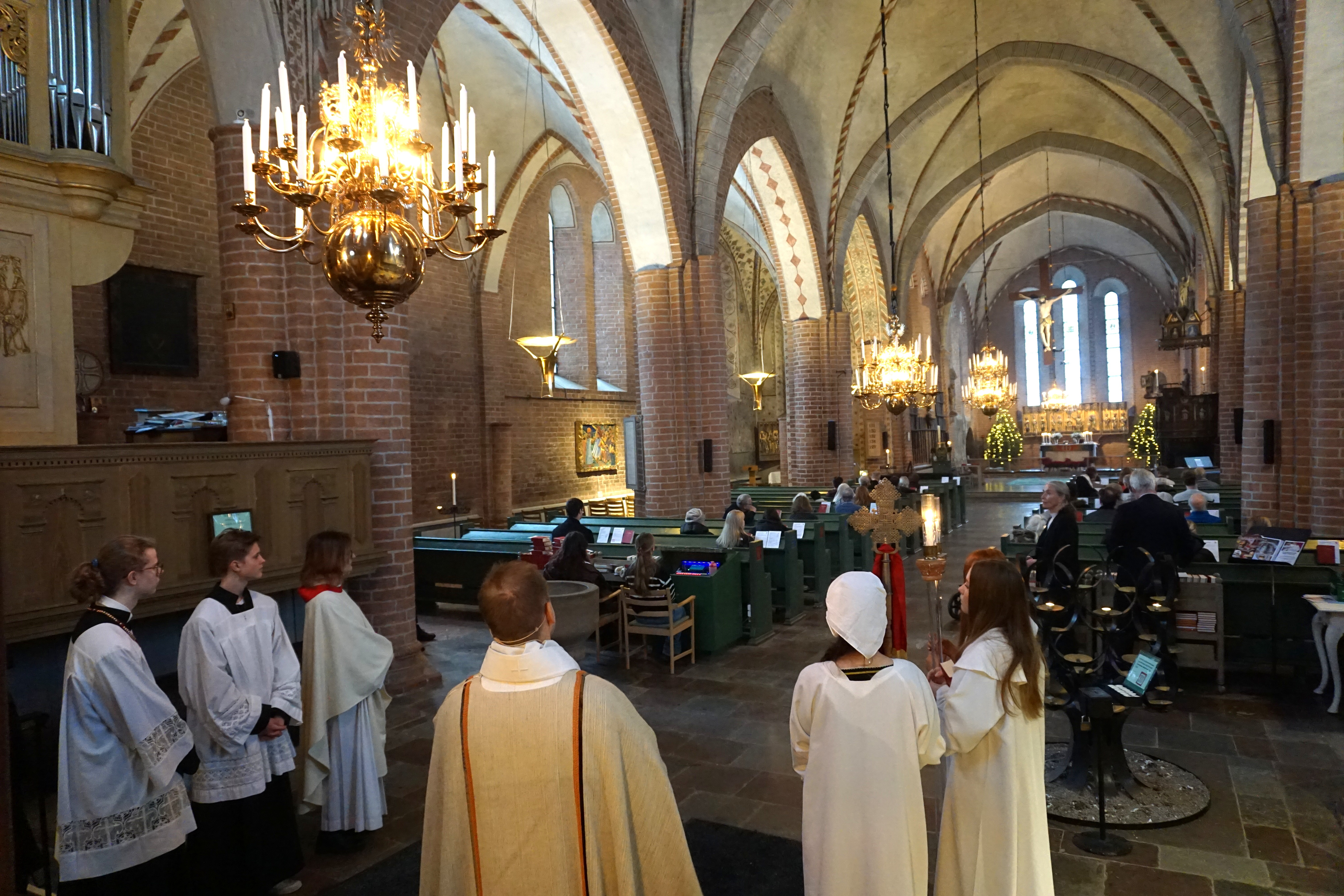
Evangelical-Lutheran altar servers of St. Mary's Church during the end of Epiphany Day Mass

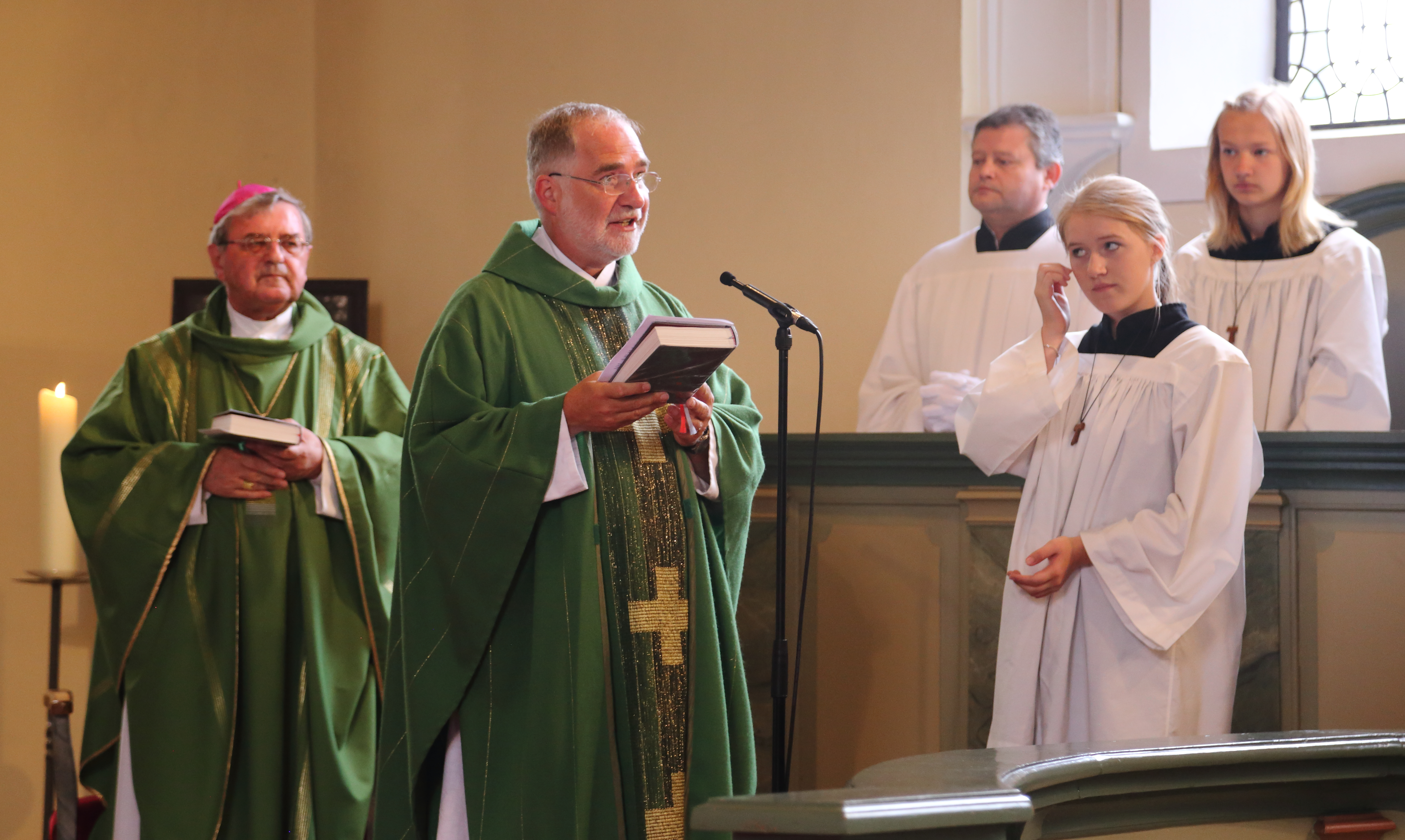
Female servers with bishop and pastor

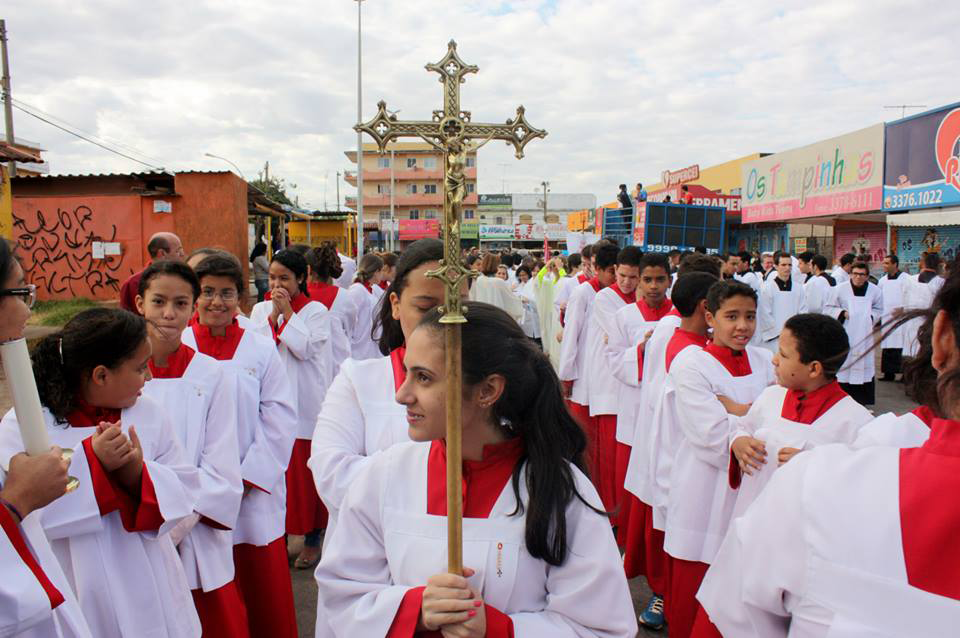
Female servers in a public procession

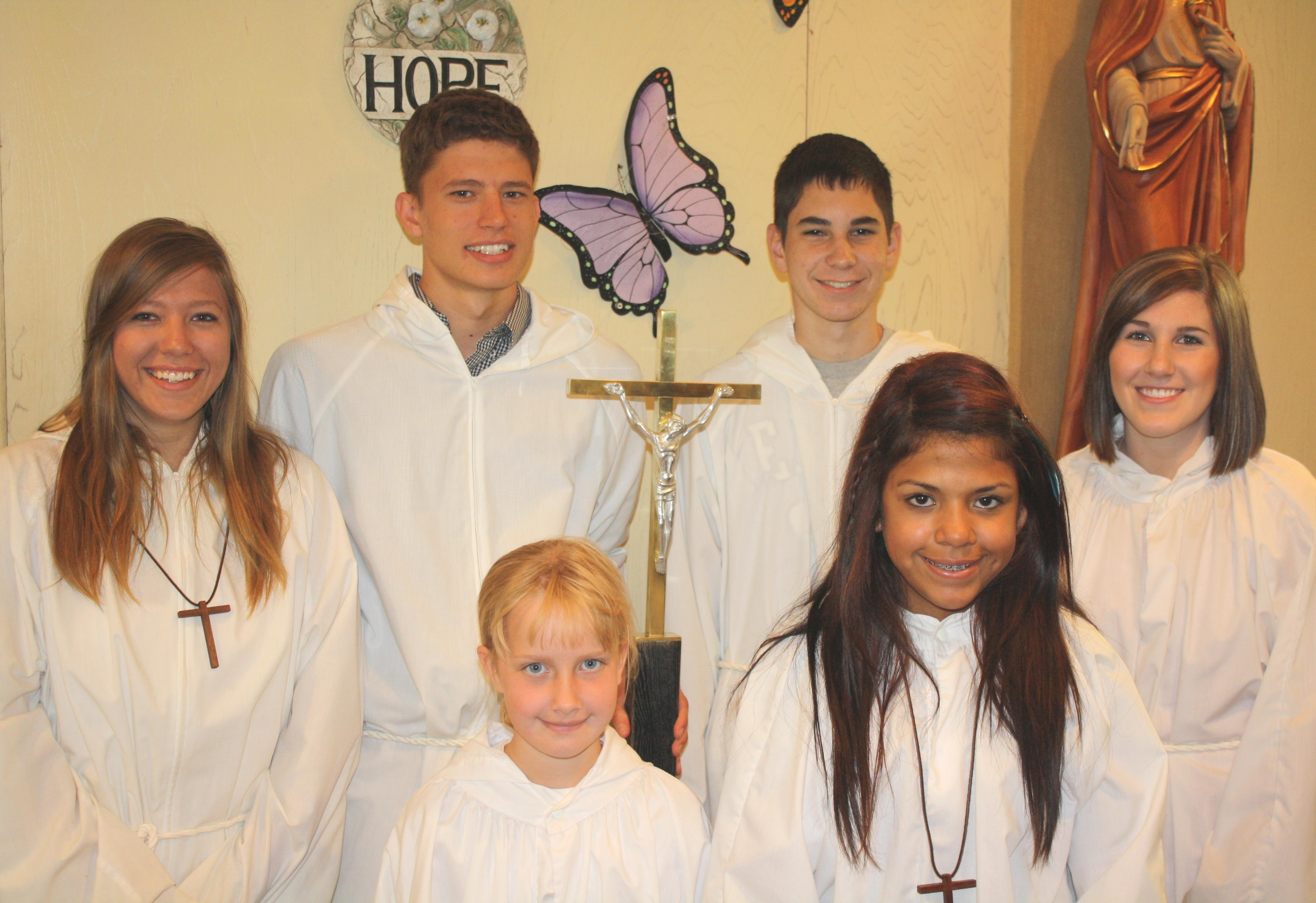
St. Robert Bellarmine Church in Jones suburb of Oklahoma City

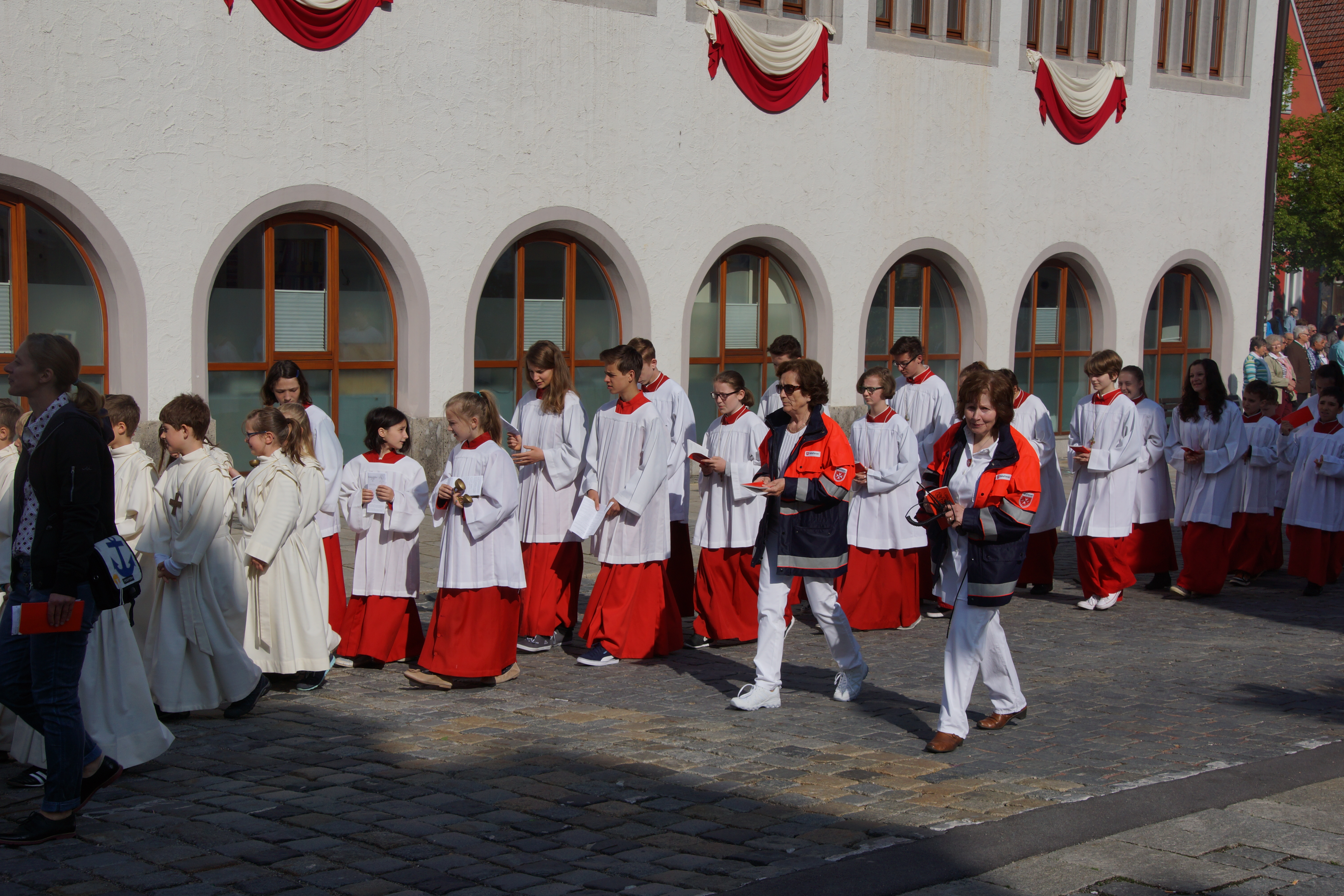
Corpus Christi procession

== Bibliography ==
John, Paul II. (1995-06-29). Letter of Pope John Paul II to Women: The Holy See, Libreria Editrice Vaticana.

- This is word-for-word of St. John Paul II speech that he gave on the 29th of June. It should be a reliable source. It covers equality of women, apologizes for how The Church treated women in the past, and how Jesus had treated women to the highest regard and that they are equal to men.

Catechism of the Catholic Church (2nd ed.). (1997). Libreria Editrice Vaticana.

- This book was published in 1997, the first edition was published in 1992, it is the summary of all of the beliefs of the Catholic faith that anyone can read. It should be a reliable source covering the beginnings of the Catholic Church and how the different laws changed.
