= Spiritus Domini (Pope Francis) =

Apostolic letter by Pope Francis

Spiritus Domini Latin for 'The Spirit of the Lord' Apostolic letter of Pope Francis
- Signature date: 10 January 2021
- Subject: Change to canon 230 §1 of the 1983 Code of Canon Law to allow women to be instituted as acolytes and lectors
- Text: In English
- AAS: 113 (2): 169-170

Spiritus Domini is an apostolic letter in the form of a motu proprio by Pope Francis signed on 10 January 2021 and released the next day. It changed the 1983 Code of Canon Law to allow women to be admitted to the instituted ministries of acolyte and lector (reader), which had until then been exclusively available to men.

== Background ==
Since the Second Vatican Council, the bishops of the Catholic Church have permitted women to serve in many lay ministries. While the offices of lector (reader) and acolyte were previously minor orders, with Ministeria quaedam, Pope Paul VI abolished these and the subdiaconate, creating "instituted ministries" in their stead. Paul VI wrote in Ministeria quaedam that "[i]n accordance with the ancient tradition of the Church, institution to the ministries of reader and acolyte is reserved to men." The two instituted ministries of lector and acolyte were restricted to men, and in many dioceses, reserved to those preparing for the priesthood in seminaries. In other dioceses, they were conferred on lay men who had been serving in these roles.

With the 1983 Code of Canon Law, the situation changed: men and women could take those roles, but women could only take them temporarily (i.e. women could not be instituted). In 1994, the Congregation for Divine Worship and the Discipline of the Sacraments under Pope John Paul II clarified that the §2 of the canon 230 of the 1983 Code of Canon Law said that it was also licit for women and girls to be altar servers just as men and boys already were, but that those women and girls were not to get the benefit of their position being instituted ministries. "In most dioceses around the world — and at the Vatican as well — women and girls have been lectors at Mass and have served at the altar for decades. That service was possible, not as a formally instituted ministry, but under the terms of Canon 230, paragraph 2, which allowed for women or men to carry out the functions 'by temporary designation'".

== Change ==
The motu proprio was signed on 10 January 2021 (the feast of the Baptism of the Lord), and released on 11 January 2021; it changes the 1983 Code of Canon Law (canon 230 §1) to state that the instituted ministries of acolyte and lector are open to "lay persons", i.e. both men and women, instead of previously "lay men". This change, Francis says, acknowledges a "doctrinal development" that has occurred in recent years.

Canon 230 §1 of the Code of Canon Law reads with this change: "Lay persons of suitable age and with the gifts determined by decree of the Episcopal Conference may be permanently assigned, by means of the established liturgical rite, to the ministries of lectors and acolytes". Previously, it read: "Lay men who possess the age and qualifications established by decree of the conference of bishops can be admitted on a stable basis through the prescribed liturgical rite to the ministries of lector and acolyte".

Pope Francis also wrote a letter to cardinal Luis Ladaria, prefect of the Congregation for the Doctrine of the Faith, to explain his decision. In it, Francis says the Amazon synod marked the necessity to think about "new paths for ecclesial ministeriality," not only for the Amazonian Church, but for the whole Catholic Church in variety of situations. He also states concerning John Paul II's affirmation of the inability of the Catholic Church to ordain women: "for non-ordained ministries it is possible, and today appears opportune, to go beyond that reservation."

== Reactions ==
Peter M.J. Stravinskas, a priest and writer of the Catholic World Report, criticized the document, saying that it would spread confusion among the faithful and contradicted prior Catholic teachings of Christifideles laici and the Instruction on Certain Questions Regarding the Collaboration of the Non-Ordained Faithful in the Sacred Ministry of the Priest.

According to Thomas O'Loughlin, the document is "a very interesting small brick in his larger pastoral edifice dedicated to implementing the reforms mandated over half a century ago by the Second Vatican Council"; he adds that this motu proprio has made canon law "catch up to the [current] theology".

== Aftermath ==
On 23 January 2022, Pope Francis installed for the first time women as instituted lectors and catechists. On this day, Pope Francis held a ceremony during which he installed six women as institutional lectors, and three women as institutional catechists, along with some men.

== See also ==
- Antiquum ministerium
- Priesthood of all believers
