= The Easter People =

Ex-official Policy Document of the Roman Catholic Church in England and Wales

The Easter People was an official policy document of the Roman Catholic Church in England and Wales.

== Background ==
The ultimate inspiration for the work which gave rise to the document was the Second Vatican Council. The immediate occasion was a National Pastoral Congress of 2,000 men and women convoked by the Bishops' Conference of England and Wales in Liverpool in 1980 to discuss a variety of potentially difficult issues.

== Work of the Congress ==
Seven reports were prepared by committees and then approved in plenary session, covering issues from the admission of divorced or remarried Catholics to the sacraments, to the admission of non-Catholics to communion, to artificial birth control, to social justice, to the ordination of women. The seven reports were drawn together by a drafting committee chaired by Archbishop Worlock, and the result was published in 1980 under the title “The Easter People”.

== Results ==
Reception of “The Easter People” was overwhelmed by the decision by Pope John Paul II at about the same time to make the first ever papal visit to Britain. Combined with the Pope’s own conservative policies, this ensured that “The Easter People” had only a very muted impact.

== References and sources ==
- Anthony Howard, Basil Hume: the monk cardinal, Headline, London, 2005, pp 124-5.
- McDonnell, Chris (6 November 2021). "What ever happened to the Easter People?". La Croix. A Call To Action (ACTA) Registered Charity Number 1187587.
