= Lay Centre at Foyer Unitas =

Catholic college in Rome, Italy

The Lay Centre at Foyer Unitas
- Latin: Centrum Laicum ad Foyer Unitas
- Established: 1 October 1986
- Affiliations: Catholic Christian
- Academic affiliations: Roman Colleges
- Rector: Professor Donna Orsuto, STD
- Students: 24
- Location: Rome, Lazio, Italy
- Campus: Caelian Hill (Passionist Retreat of Giovanni e Paolo)
- Colors: Blue and yellow
- Website: www.laycentre.org

The Lay Centre at Foyer Unitas is a Catholic educational institution and accommodation centre in Rome which is mainly open to members of the laity. It provides an international community and formation for lay ecclesial ministers and other lay students at the pontifical universities, athenaeums, and institutes in Rome, Italy. It is international in character and composition, and welcomes ecumenical students from other Christian churches and ecclesial communities, as well as those from non-Christian religions.

== Mission ==
The Lay Centre's mission is threefold:

- Create an international community for students attending pontifical institutes in Rome and for visiting scholars who are researching or teaching in Rome.
- Provide an intensive international study programs.
- Offer theological and spiritual programs directed towards the local community.

== History ==
The Lay Centre at Foyer Unitas was founded in 1986 by Prof. Donna Orsuto and Ms. Riekie van Velzen as a community for the lay students at the Pontifical Universities in Rome; both of them had lived in the building as students, when it was run by the Ladies of Bethany, and took over the building when they left.

Orsuto completed her Doctorate in Sacred Theology at the Pontifical University of Saint Thomas Aquinas, Angelicum in 1990 with a dissertation entitled Saint Catherine of Siena: trinitarian experience and mission in the Church. Recognizing a need for a resident college open to lay people who were not members of religious communities, and seeing an opportunity in the closing of the Casa Foyer Unitas, the Lay Centre opened on 1 October 1986.

Orsuto is professor at the Institute of Spirituality of the Pontifical Gregorian University in Rome, Italy, and an adjunct professor of the Faculty of Theology at the Pontifical University of Saint Thomas Aquinas, Angelicum.

=== Foyer Unitas ===
Foyer Unitas, meaning “Hearth of Unity”, had itself started as an information centre for non-Catholic pilgrims and visitors to Rome during the Holy Year of 1950, directed by Charles Boyer, SJ, at the request of Monsignor Giovanni Battista Montini (later Pope Paul VI), who was then responsible for ordinary affairs at the Secretariat of State. Two years later, a Dutch religious institute with a charism for ecumenism and hospitality, the Ladies of Bethany, received an invitation from Pope Pius XII to expand their ministry to Rome and assist Fr. Boyer with the Foyer Unitas. In addition to the general information centre work, the Ladies of Bethany provided specialized tours around Rome and Vatican City, combining catechesis, theology, church history, art and architecture with an awareness of the particular interests of ecumenical pilgrims.

In 1956 they expanded their facilities to accommodate resident students. By 1962 the pending Vatican II Council prompted another relocation and expansion, this time to the Collegio Innocenziano in the complex of the Palazzo Pamphilj, next to the church of Sant'Agnese in Agone on Piazza Navona. While there, Foyer Unitas served as the residence for official ecumenical observers at the council and their families, and was the site of weekly briefing sessions offered by various periti of the council to the ecumenical observers. These briefings, conducted in English and other modern languages (in contrast to the official business of the council, in Latin) proved so popular that soon several of the Council Fathers began attending as well. At least four of the major documents of the council were drafted during these consultations. Among the peritii who presented at the briefings, and who resided at Foyer Unitas for a short time, was Prof. Joseph Ratzinger (later Pope Benedict XVI).

By 1986, however, changes in Italian law which required religious guest houses to meet the same codes as hotels and pensione, combined with the ageing of the original staff, prompted the Ladies of Bethany to close Foyer Unitas. It was at this time that that Orsuto and van Velzen, two of their au pair student staff, proposed to use the space to open a resident community, which they dubbed the Lay Centre at Foyer Unitas.

=== The Lay Centre ===
The Lay Centre community stayed in the site of Foyer Unitas for 15 years, even expanding to include a second location at the Venerable English College nearby. In 2001, to accommodate the growing numbers and bring the residents of the two sites back together, the Lay Centre relocated to a house on the property of the Pontifical Irish College, near San Giovanni in Laterano. In 2009, after two years of negotiations, the Lay Centre leased a section of the Passionist Retreat of Sts. John and Paul, on the Caelian Hill overlooking the Coliseum, allowing more space for the resident community and the other programs. An official inauguration of the new site was celebrated in April 2010, featuring vespers presided by Bishop Brian Farrell of the Pontifical Council for Promoting Christian Unity and a reflection offered by U.S. Ambassador to the Holy See, Miguel Díaz.

Over the years, the programs and scope of formation offered by the Lay Centre has expanded. The resident community remains relatively small, compared to the number of lay students in Rome, but the impact of the centre is extensive.

== Formation ==
The Lay Centre has developed, in collaboration with the Congregation for Catholic Education, a comprehensive program of formation appropriate to the lay person called to an ecclesial vocation, grounded in the baptismal priesthood. The program assists the lay faithful to discern their vocation within the communion and mission of the church. Its program is based on the four pillars of formation outlined by the Catholic Church in various documents: Human, Spiritual, Intellectual and Pastoral.

The Spiritual formation includes the opportunity for daily participation in the Liturgy of the Hours, particularly vespers. Wednesday evenings are community evenings which begin with the liturgy of the Eucharist, with a guest presider, usually a bishop or priest from one of the curial dicasteries or pontifical universities. A chapel, with the Blessed Sacrament reserved, is available to residents twenty-four hours a day, seven days a week.

For students in Rome's Pontifical Universities, the classroom provides only a part of the intellectual formation that all students are expected to receive while enrolled. The rest is to be found in their respective colleges. To that end, part of the weekly community evening is a presentation on a topic of contemporary church life, theology, ecumenism, or spirituality from the guest presider, in an informal setting over dinner. Additionally, residents are able to take advantage of the ongoing formation programs offered by the centre.

Human formation takes the form of a variety of excursions through the city of Rome focusing on church and civil history, art and architecture, and culture. Students engage on a daily basis in the “dialogue of life” with a diverse community which spans the globe. The daily life of the community encourages consideration of others’ different cultural assumptions, and all share housekeeping responsibilities. Volunteer placement in services around the city is available with groups such as the Missionaries of Charity and the Community of Sant’Egidio.

Residents prepare to serve alongside presbyters and deacons, monks and mendicants, lay ecclesial ministers and people involved in lay movements. As students of pontifical faculties, most will serve in an ecclesial vocation, often as an academic theologian or lay ecclesial minister at the national or diocesan level. Part of the pastoral formation is learning to work with the variety of people in a variety of ministries in the exercise of their service for the church.

== Community ==
In addition to this program of formation, The Lay Centre provides students with a room that includes internet and telephone connectivity, and community life considerations: Wednesday formation evenings, three-meals each day (including a self-service breakfast), the space and time for communal prayer, and regularly scheduled cultural and social events. The Lay Centre staff is on hand to ease the transition to Roman life, and to provide the students with practical support. All residents are involved in The Lay Centre's activities, from day-to-day, simple house tasks to helping with our various lecture series at special times during the year.

Hospitality is a key theme of the Lay Centre, and owes much to the charism of the Ladies of Bethany and Foyer Unitas out of which the Lay Centre was born. Part of this is the commitment to welcoming ecumenical and interreligious guests into the community's dialogue of life, while maintaining a Catholic identity. Part of this ministry is in small acts of hospitality, welcoming guests to community meals, and inviting the Roman community into the centre for events throughout the year.

About twenty-five people can reside full-time in the Lay Centre, typically representing a broad international and interreligious diversity. The 2015-2016 community, for example, included residents from eighteen countries and eleven religious traditions: Catholic, Anglican, Lutheran, Reformed, Orthodox, and Oriental Orthodox Christians; Jewish, Muslim, Buddhist, Unitarian Universalist, and T'ienti Teachings are all represented.

== Continuing formation programs ==
=== Vincent Pallotti Institute ===
The Vincent Pallotti Institute was founded as the Rome branch of Education for Parish Service (EPS) of Trinity College in Washington, DC. EPS had been founded in 1978 to “To prepare as many Catholics as possible to live out their baptismal commitment to evangelization.” In 1986, EPS negotiated with Foyer Unitas to coordinate its programming in Rome, assisted by residents of the nascent Lay Centre. EPS closed its doors in 2011, but the Lay Centre continues to offer programming in the name of the Vincent Pallotti Institute. A series of classes are offered on Thursday mornings to the anglophone community of Rome, bringing in lecturers from the pontifical faculties, the Roman curia, and guest lecturers from throughout the Catholic world.

St. Vincent Pallotti was a Roman priest who, early in the 19th century, founded the Union of Catholic Apostolate, a community of clergy and laity.

=== Oasis in the City ===
The Oasis in the City evening events are free lectures and presentations open to the public, offered in both Italian and English. Previous presenters have included Rev. Dr. Olav Fykse Tveit, General Secretary of the World Council of Churches; Rev. Timothy Radcliffe, OP, former Master of the Order; Rabbi Jack Bemporad of the Center for Interreligious Understanding; Archbishop Luis Ladaria, SJ, of the Congregation for the Doctrine of the Faith, and Mary McAleese, president emeritus of Ireland.

== International programs ==
The Lay Centre offers the laity a unique opportunity to explore the history and theology of Rome. A variety of formats include weeklong and weekend study programs designed for parishes, universities, and other organizations. Programs are shaped by the Catholic traditions of liturgical prayer, erudite study, lively dialogue, and pilgrimage to various Christian sites in the Eternal City. Types of programs include a three-week January-term program for university students; week-long thematic programs open to lay ecclesial ministers, teachers, and other lay leaders from around the world; and tailored programs for particular groups, such as the Association of Catholic Colleges and Universities. The most recent was a conference celebrating the 50th anniversary of the opening of Vatican II, co-organized with the National Association of Lay Ministry in the U.S.

== Leadership and organization ==
The Lay Centre at Foyer Unitas is a legally recognized institute in Italy. In the United States it is incorporated as a not-for-profit corporation and is recognized by the Internal Revenue Service as a 501(c)(3) charitable organization. It is governed by an eight-member Board of Directors, which includes a Passionist priest and a former resident. An Honorary Board supports the work of the Lay Centre, and includes expert Vaticanist John Allen Jr; Archbishop Michael L. Fitzgerald, Apostolic Nuncio to Egypt; Ambassador Tony Hall (ret.) and Secretary James Nicholson (ret.).

In 2026, co-founder Professor Donna Orsuto, S.T.D., serves as director of the centre. Ms. Reikie van Velzen, DSS, has served as administrator. Other staff includes a chief operating officer, office manager, cooks, and facilities staff. Resident community members are also responsible for sharing in a number of house jobs and staffing the local education events. A handful of residents have a kind of 'work-study' arrangement of about 20–25 hours a week of additional support of programs in exchange for room and board.

The annual operating budget (as of 2015):

Revenues totaled approximately $765,000, including:

- $215,000 from resident rent and membership fees,
- $200,000 from program fees,
- $350,000 from grants and donations.

Expenses totaled $800,000, including:

- $135,000 in rent,
- $310,000 in payroll and benefits expenses,
- $80,000 in payroll taxes.

=== Papal recognition ===
As part of the 25th anniversary of the Lay Centre, on 1 December 2011, during Eucharist celebrated by Archbishop Joseph Tobin, CSsR, at the Basilica of Giovanni e Paolo, the co-founders of the Lay Centre at Foyer Unitas were honored by Pope Benedict XVI in the form of investiture into papal orders of knighthood: Donna Orsuto was created a Dame of the Order of St. Gregory the Great. Riekie van Velzen was created a Dame of the Order of Pope St. Sylvester.
