= Lay ecclesial ministry =

Lay ecclesial ministry is the term adopted by the United States Conference of Catholic Bishops to identify the relatively new category of pastoral ministers in the Catholic Church who serve the Church but are not ordained. Lay ecclesial ministers are coworkers with the bishop alongside priests and deacons. In other contexts, these may be known as "instituted catechists", "pastoral workers", "pastoral associates", etc.

== Overview ==
Prior to and since the Second Vatican Council, several ministries that had for a time been retained by the presbyterate (priests) were returned to the laity, and several new forms of ministry emerged.

The burgeoning awareness of the vocation of the laity as apostles to the secular world and stewards of the Church's mission as an evangelizer has given rise to the popular term "lay ministry" to refer to the active vocation of all the baptized. This general ministry of the laity has at times also been called the "lay apostolate" and the "lay vocation". Included in this general lay ministry are several specific ministries designed to support the Church community, such as lector/reader, extraordinary minister of Holy Communion, catechist, sponsor/godparent, spouse, parent, etc.

In addition to this general lay ministry, there are a number of non-ordained people who have undertaken roles, that immediately prior to Vatican II belonged entirely to the ordained, including parish pastoral and catechetical staff, hospital and prison chaplains, campus ministers, and many other diocesan leadership roles. Today, even the Roman Curia includes a small number of lay ecclesial ministers.

Lay ecclesial ministry includes a broad category rather than a specific job title. It has been adopted by the United States Conference of Catholic Bishops (USCCB) to "establish a framework to indicate what is common to many roles and responsibilities undertaken by lay persons, for example, Pastoral Coordinator or Moderator of a Parish, Pastoral Associate, Director of Religious Education, Youth Minister, Campus Minister, Hospital Chaplain."

According to the USCCB, this ecclesial ministry includes:

- Authorization of the hierarchy to serve publicly in the local Church
- Leadership in a particular area of ministry
- Close mutual collaboration with the pastoral ministry of bishops, priests, and deacons
- Preparation and formation appropriate to the level of responsibilities that are assigned to them including; human, spiritual, pastoral, and theological dimensions

While many bishops are quick to note that this does not represent a new level of the hierarchy, the Church has observed a clear differentiation between Lay Ecclesial Ministry and the general ministry of the laity. Clearly members of the laity, lay ecclesial ministers serve the Church. An ecclesial ministry is one that is directed ad intra rather than ad extra. The ecclesial vocations serve the Church, while lay vocations are vocations by which the Church serves the world.

Programs for the theological education and pastoral formation of laypersons, for the purpose in engaging in full-time and often lifelong ministry in the Church, have grown exponentially in the last four decades. By 2002 there were 34,000 lay ministers who had graduated from United States Lay Ecclesial Ministry Programs. As of 2008, there are more than ten times as many students preparing in university and diocesan divinity programs for a vocation as a Lay Ecclesial Minister, as there are seminarians preparing for the presbyterate. Since 1986, there has even been a Roman college for future lay ecclesial ministers and theologians studying at Pontifical Universities, the Lay Centre at Foyer Unitas.

In many dioceses, lay ecclesial ministers already account for the majority of the ecclesial and pastoral ministers alongside deacons and presbyters. According to a study by the National Pastoral Life Center, since at least 2007 the number of Lay Ecclesial Ministers employed in full- or part-time parish ministry (29,000) has exceeded the number of presbyters employed in full- or part-time parish ministry (27,000), and the number of Lay Ecclesial Ministers continues to grow while the number of priests in parish ministry continues to contract. The number of Lay Ecclesial Ministers in parish grew in 2009 to 37,929. Many more Lay Ecclesial Ministers serve in other Catholic institutions, schools, hospitals, dioceses, etc.

The reality of lay ecclesial ministry is experienced in a number of regions. In Germany and the Netherlands, the terms "pastoral worker" or "pastoral assistant" are preferred for those engaged in lay ecclesial ministry. In parts of South America, and islands of the South Pacific, lay ecclesial ministers who are religious educators are called "catechists". In the United States, the term catechist more generally refers to volunteer lay Sunday school teachers, but in a broader meaning also includes Catholic school teachers, as well as clergy and lay ecclesial ministers responsible for overseeing faith formation.

== See also ==
- Associations of the faithful
- Catechism of the Catholic Church
- List of Ecclesial movements
- Rite of Christian Initiation of Adults (RCIA)
- Spiritus Domini (Pope Francis)
- Universal call to holiness
- Vocational discernment in the Catholic Church
