= George Talbot (papal chamberlain) =

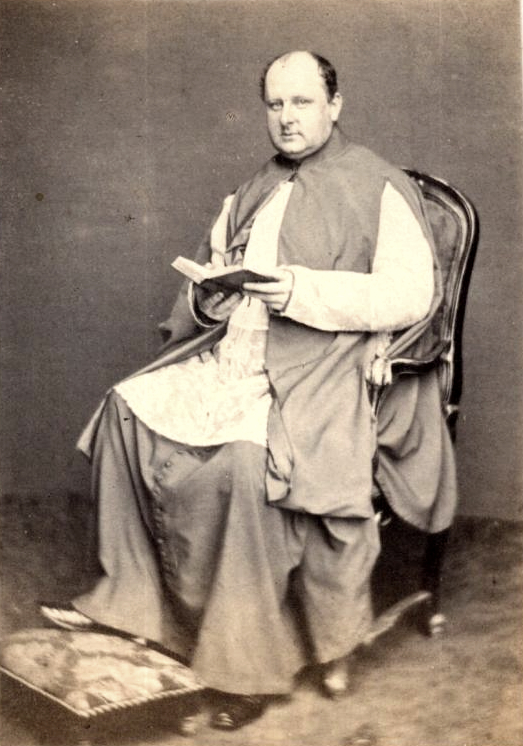
Mgr. George Talbot, 1865 photograph

George Talbot (1816–1886) was an Anglo-Irish cleric of the Church of England, who as a Roman Catholic convert became a papal chamberlain.

== Early life ==
He was a younger son of James Talbot, 3rd Baron Talbot of Malahide, a British intelligence chief of the French Revolutionary Wars period, and his wife Anne Sarah Rodbard, daughter of Samuel Rodbard of Evercreech, Somerset. He was educated at Eton College, where he was a pupil by 1829.

Talbot matriculated at Balliol College, Oxford in 1834. He graduated B.A. at St Mary Hall in 1839, and took up the position of vicar of Evercreech in 1840. He graduated M.A. in 1841.

On 10 July 1843, at St Mary's College, Oscott, Talbot was received into the Catholic Church by Nicholas Wiseman. He trained for the Catholic priesthood at Oscott, with Edward Henry Howard and Edmund Stonor, lifelong friends. He was ordained priest by Wiseman in 1846. He is listed as an early Tractarian (Oxford Movement) convert, as someone familiar with the movement leaders at Oxford, or knowing their works. In 1847 he was rebuffed by John Henry Newman, when he offered to join Newman's proposed English branch of the Congregation of Oratorians. In the period 1848–9 he worked as a priest at St George's, Southwark.

== In Rome ==
Wiseman arranged for Talbot to become a canon of St. Peter's Basilica, Rome, with a position as papal chamberlain. The Pope was Pius IX, and Talbot, a committed Ultramontanist, became an influential figure as one of his advisers. He was an important ally in the Vatican of the Cardinals Nicholas Wiseman and Henry Edward Manning. He arranged two audiences with the Pope for the Prince of Wales, and English Catholic bishops frequently used him as a channel. He briefed John Maguire for his book Rome; its ruler and its institutions (1856), rewarded with the Order of St. Gregory the Great.

In 1852, it was Talbot's initiative to found what is now Beda College. In its early years at the English College, Rome it was known as the Collegio Pio. By the 1860s, he had been given charge of a church in the Piazza del Popolo. On an English visit in 1864, he wished to induce John Henry Newman to preach there. At the Birmingham Oratory, he found he had to make the invitation through Edward Caswall. To an invitation by letter, implying the Pope's support for the idea, Newman, who had a low opinion of Talbot, turned down the offer.

== Last years ==
In 1868, Talbot gave a papal benediction at St John the Evangelist Church, Islington, in a Vespers service to celebrate 25 years since its foundation. Frederick Oakeley, parish priest there, had been at Southwark with Talbot in 1848. From 1869, Talbot was treated by the French alienist Émile Blanche, living in his house in Passy. He died there in 1886, and was buried in the Père Lachaise Cemetery
