= Reader (liturgy) =

Anagnostes who reads aloud from the scriptures

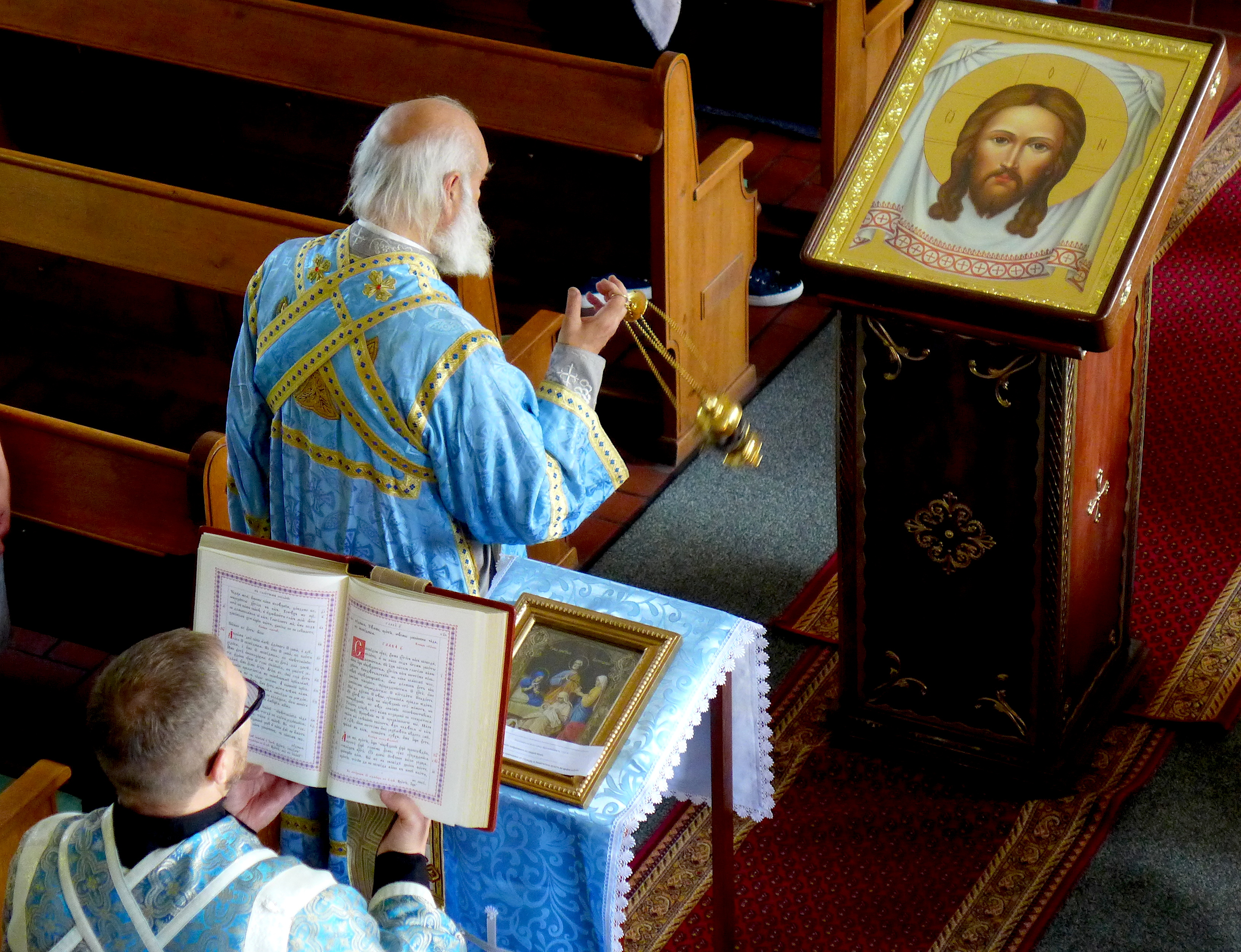
Reader in the Divine Liturgy

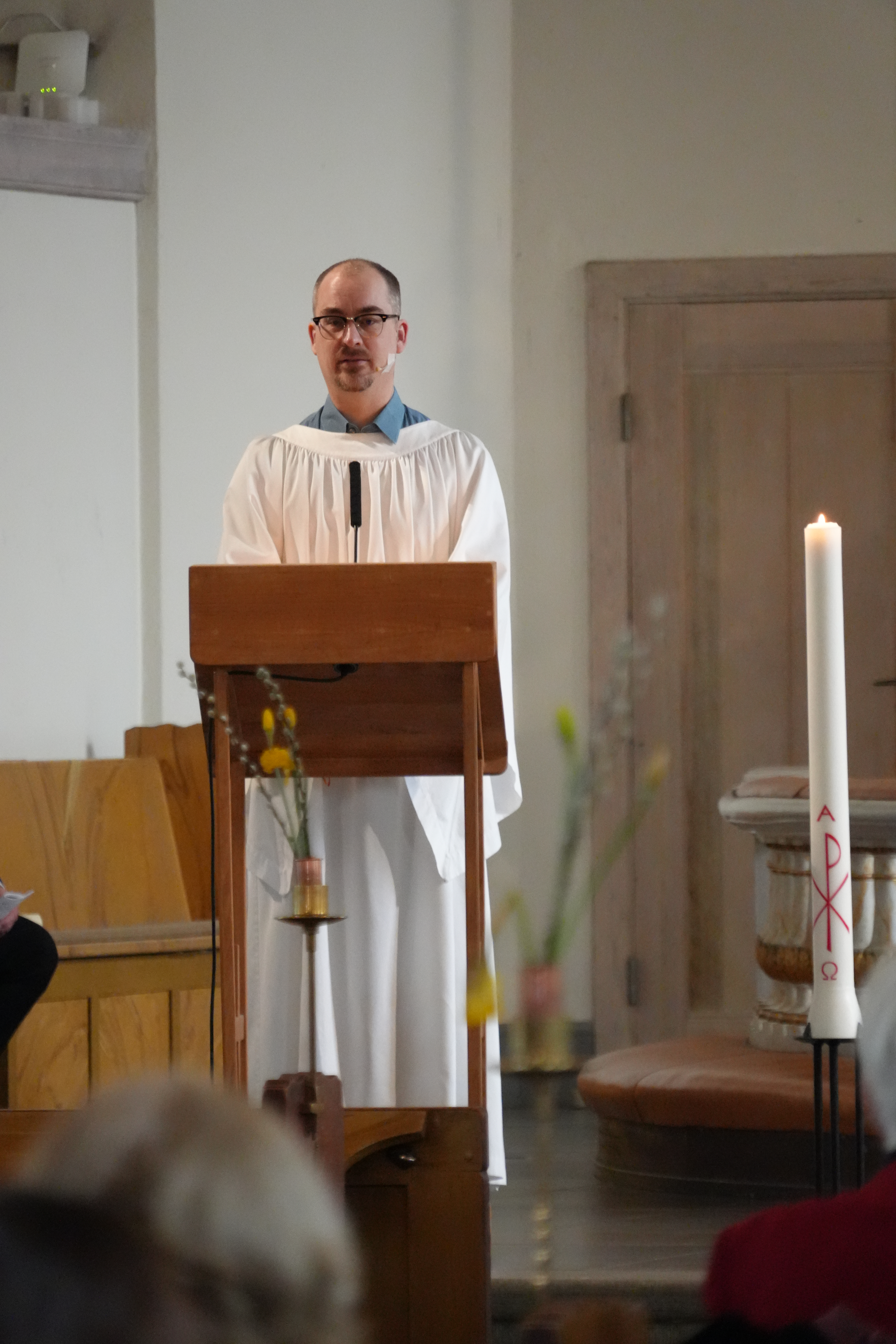
A lector does the first reading during the Mass of Easter Monday at Kungsholm Evangelical-Lutheran Church, part of the Diocese of Stockholm in Sweden (2026).

In some Christian denominations, a reader or lector is the person responsible for reading aloud excerpts of scripture at a liturgy. In early Christian times the reader was of particular value due to the rarity of literacy.

== Western Christianity ==
=== Catholic Church ===
In the Latin liturgical rites of the Catholic Church, the term lector or reader means someone who in a particular liturgy is assigned to read a Biblical text other than the Gospel (singing or reading the Gospel at Mass belongs to the service of the deacon or, in his absence, to the priest). But it also has the more specific meaning of a person who has been "instituted" as a lector or reader, and is such even when not assigned to read in a specific liturgy. The Second Vatican Council's Sacrosanctum Concilium, the Second Vatican Council's Constitution on the Sacred Liturgy, confirmed that lectors belong to those who exercise a "genuine liturgical function" and should therefore "discharge their office with the sincere piety and decorum demanded by so exalted a ministry and rightly expected of them by God's people."

The office was formerly classed as one of the four minor orders in the Latin Church. However, since 1 January 1973, the apostolic letter Ministeria quaedam decreed instead that:

1. What up to now were called minor orders are henceforth to be called ministries.
2. Ministries may be assigned to laypeople; hence they are no longer to be considered as reserved to candidates for the sacrament of orders.
3. Two ministries, adapted to present-day needs, are to be preserved in the whole Latin Church, namely, those of reader and acolyte. The functions heretofore assigned to the subdeacon are entrusted to the reader and the acolyte.
4. The reader is appointed for a function proper to him, that of reading the word of God in the liturgical assembly. Accordingly, he is to proclaim readings from sacred Scripture; he is to recite the responsorial psalm between the readings when there is no psalmist; he may present the intentions for the general intercessions in the absence of a deacon; he is to direct the singing and the participation by the faithful; he is to instruct the faithful for the worthy reception of the sacraments. He may also, insofar as may be necessary, take care of preparing other faithful who are appointed on a temporary basis to read the Scriptures in liturgical celebrations. That he may more fittingly and perfectly fulfill these functions, he is to meditate assiduously on sacred Scripture.

Aware of the office he has undertaken, the reader is to make every effort and employ suitable means to acquire that increasingly warm and living love and knowledge of Scripture that will make him a more perfect disciple of the Lord.

Canon 1035 of the 1983 Code of Canon Law requires candidates for diaconal ordination to have received and have exercised for an appropriate time the ministries of lector and acolyte and prescribes that institution in the second of these ministries must precede by at least six months ordination as a deacon.

Instituted lectors, either men or women (since the 2021 motu proprio Spiritus Domini), are obliged, when proclaiming the readings at Mass, to wear an alb or an "other suitable attire that has been legitimately approved by the Conference of Bishops". such as cassock and surplice. Others who perform the function of lector, "may go to the ambo in ordinary attire, but this should be in keeping with the customs of the different regions."

The General Instruction of the Roman Missal speaks as follows of those who, without being lectors in the specific sense, carry out their functions at Mass: "In the absence of an instituted lector, other lay people may be deputed to proclaim the readings from Sacred Scripture, people who are truly suited to carrying out this function and carefully prepared, so that by their hearing the readings from the sacred texts the faithful may conceive in their hearts a sweet and living affection for Sacred Scripture." In its sections the same document lists the lector's specific duties at Mass.

Traditionalist Catholic organizations such as the Priestly Fraternity of St. Peter, the Institute of Christ the King Sovereign Priest and the Personal Apostolic Administration of Saint John Mary Vianney are authorized to use the pre-1973 rite for their members who receive the office of lector.

=== Evangelical-Lutheran Churches ===
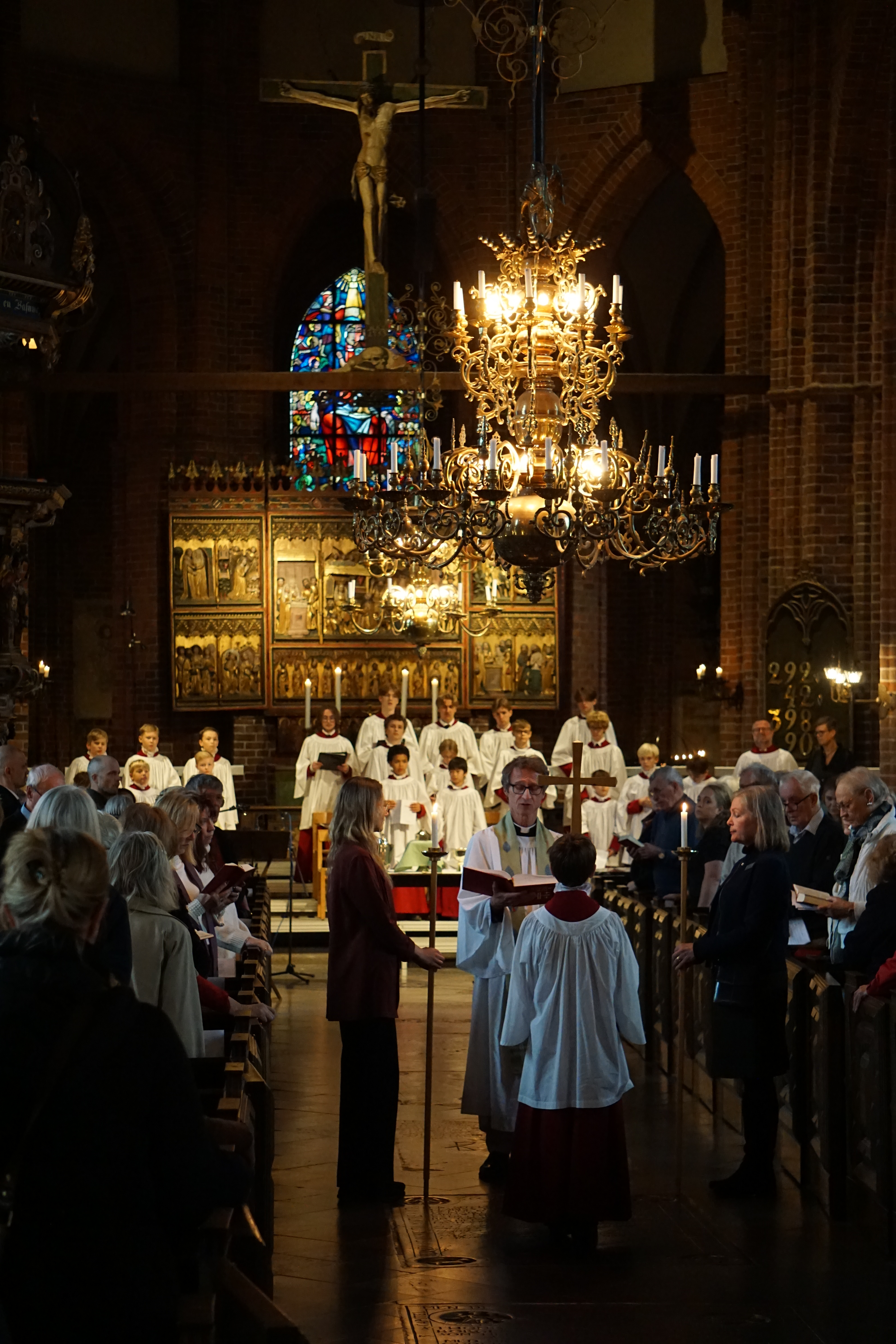
The reading of the Epistle during Mass at Saint Mary's Evangelical-Lutheran Church in Helsingborg, Sweden

During the Mass of the Evangelical-Lutheran Churches, lectors read the lection from the Old Testament, as well as the Psalm (though this is often sung by the cantor). The reading of the Gospel is normatively reserved for the priest (pastor).

=== Anglican Churches ===
Minor orders were discontinued in the reformed Church of England. The modern office of reader was introduced in 1866 and is distinct from the traditional minor order of reader. It is the office of a licensed lay minister and, for this reason, a person holding the office is referred to as a "lay reader" in many parts of the Anglican Communion. After a period of theological training (often, in the case of the Church of England, three years of evening classes), a lay person is licensed to preach and lead public worship. A reader is not a member of the clergy and cannot preside at the Eucharist, officiate at marriages, absolve or bless.

A reader is licensed to lead non-sacramental worship (including, in some cases, funerals), may assist in the leadership of eucharistic worship and may preach. Anglican readers in some countries often wear a blue tippet with choir dress.

=== Methodist Churches ===
In the Global Methodist Church, Free Methodist Church and United Methodist Church in the United States, a certified lay minister is a servant, who is called and equipped to conduct public worship, care for the congregation, assist in program leadership, develop new and existing faith communities, preach the Word, lead small groups, or establish community outreach ministries as part of a ministry team with the supervision and support of an ordained minister.

The role of certified lay minister is intended for missional leadership in churches or other ministry settings as part of a team ministry under the supervision of clergy, and they are assigned to a local church by the district superintendent, unlike clergy who are appointed by a bishop.

== Eastern Christianity ==
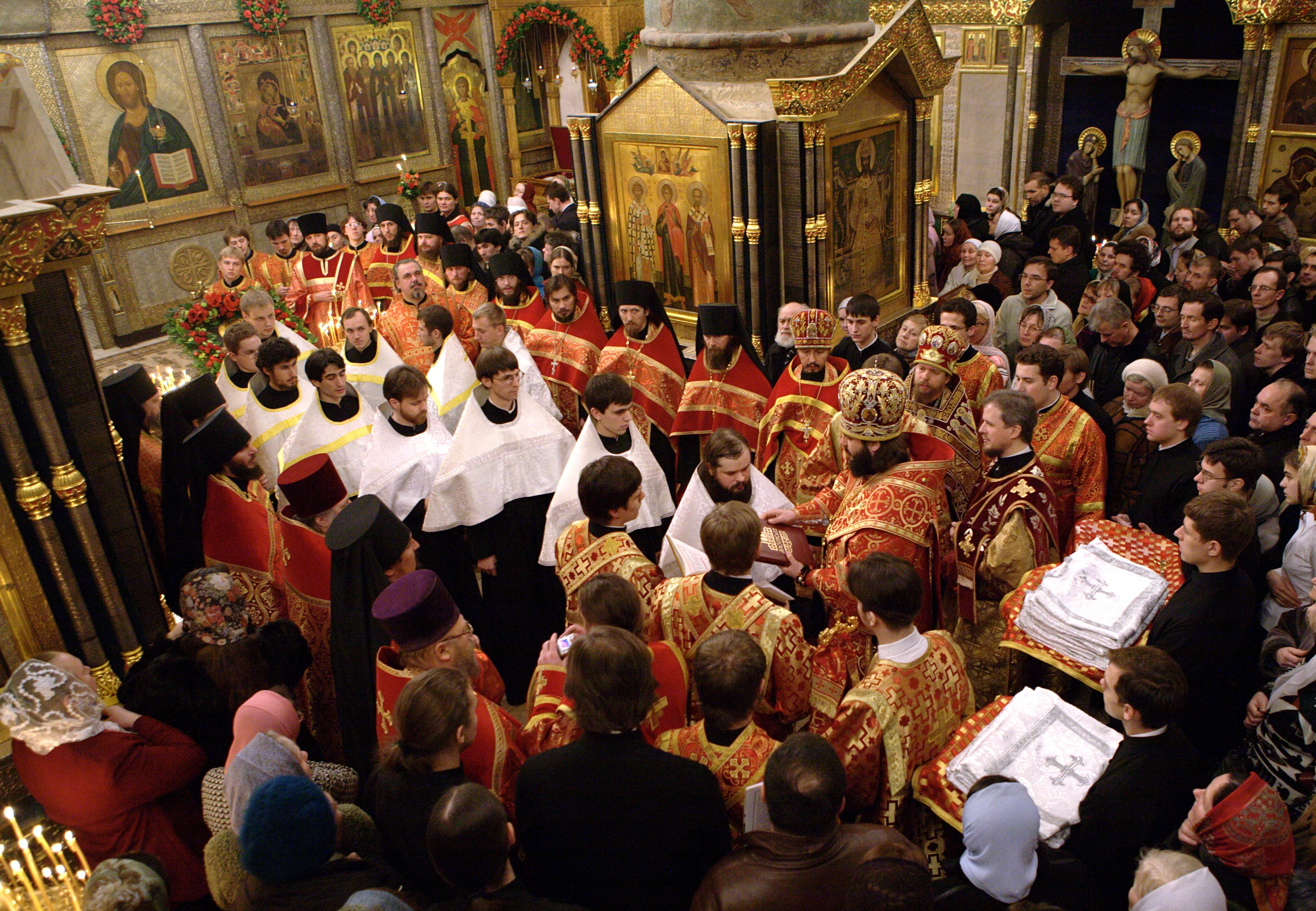
The tonsuring of readers in a seminary by a Russian Orthodox bishop. The readers being ordained are wearing the short phelon (in white).

In the Eastern Orthodox Church, Eastern Lutheran Churches, and in the Eastern Catholic Churches of Byzantine tradition, the reader (in Greek, Ἀναγνώστης Anagnostis; in Church Slavonic, чтец chtets) is the second highest of the minor orders of clergy. This order is higher than the doorkeeper (now largely obsolete) and lower than the subdeacon.

Immediately before ordination as a reader, the candidate is tonsured as a sign of his submission and obedience upon entry into the clerical state. It is a separate act from ordination. The tonsure is performed only once, immediately prior to the actual ordination of a reader, which the ordination rite refers to as "the first degree of priesthood". However, it is not the means whereby a person becomes a reader. Readers, like subdeacons, are ordained by Cheirothesia—literally, "to place hands"—whereas Cheirotonia—"to stretch out the hands"—is practised at the ordination of the higher clergy: bishops, priests and deacons.

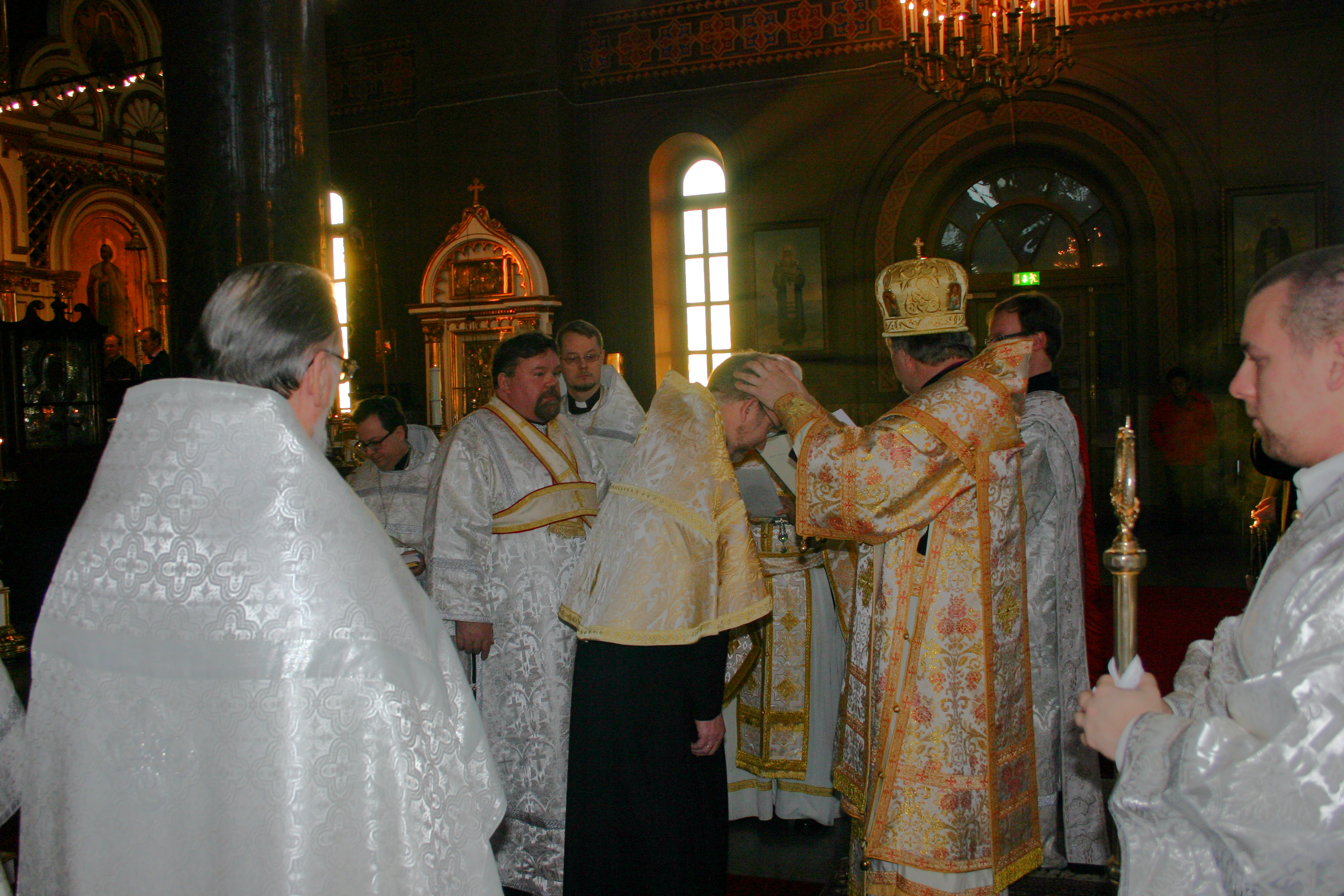
The ordination of a reader in Finland

After being tonsured, the reader is vested in a short phelon, which he wears while reading the Epistle for the first time. This short phelon is then removed (and never worn thereafter) and replaced with a stikhar, which the reader wears thereafter whenever he performs his liturgical duties. This practice is not universal, however, and many bishops and priests will allow a reader to perform his function dressed only in a cassock or (if a monk) a riassa. Sometimes, a bishop will decree what vesting practice he wishes to be followed within his own diocese.

Byzantine icons often show readers and church singers wearing a stikhar-like garment (more loose and flowing than the modern stikhar) and a pointed hat with the brim pulled out to the sides.

In Eastern Thrace, during the Ottoman period and prior to the tragedy of 1922, some laypeople were selected through symbolic tonsure and Cheirothesia to receive the ecclesiastical blessing and rank of ''Anagnostis''.

== See also ==
- Baal keriah
- Cantor
