= Laudato si' (disambiguation) =

Laudato si' is medieval Central Italian for 'Praise be to you'.

- "Laudato si'", a frequent phrase in the Canticle of the Sun by Francis of Assisi
- Laudato si', the second encyclical of Pope Francis
- Laudato si' (oratorio), an oratorio by Helmut Schlegel and Peter Reulein
- Laudato Si' Movement, a Catholic environmental organisation
