= Kostelanetz =

Kostelanetz is a surname. Notable people with the surname include:

- Andre Kostelanetz (1901–1980), Russian-born American popular orchestral music conductor and arranger
- Boris Kostelanetz (1911–2006), tax lawyer
- Richard Kostelanetz (born 1940), American artist, author, and critic
