= Assembling (magazine) =

American annual magazine launched in 1970

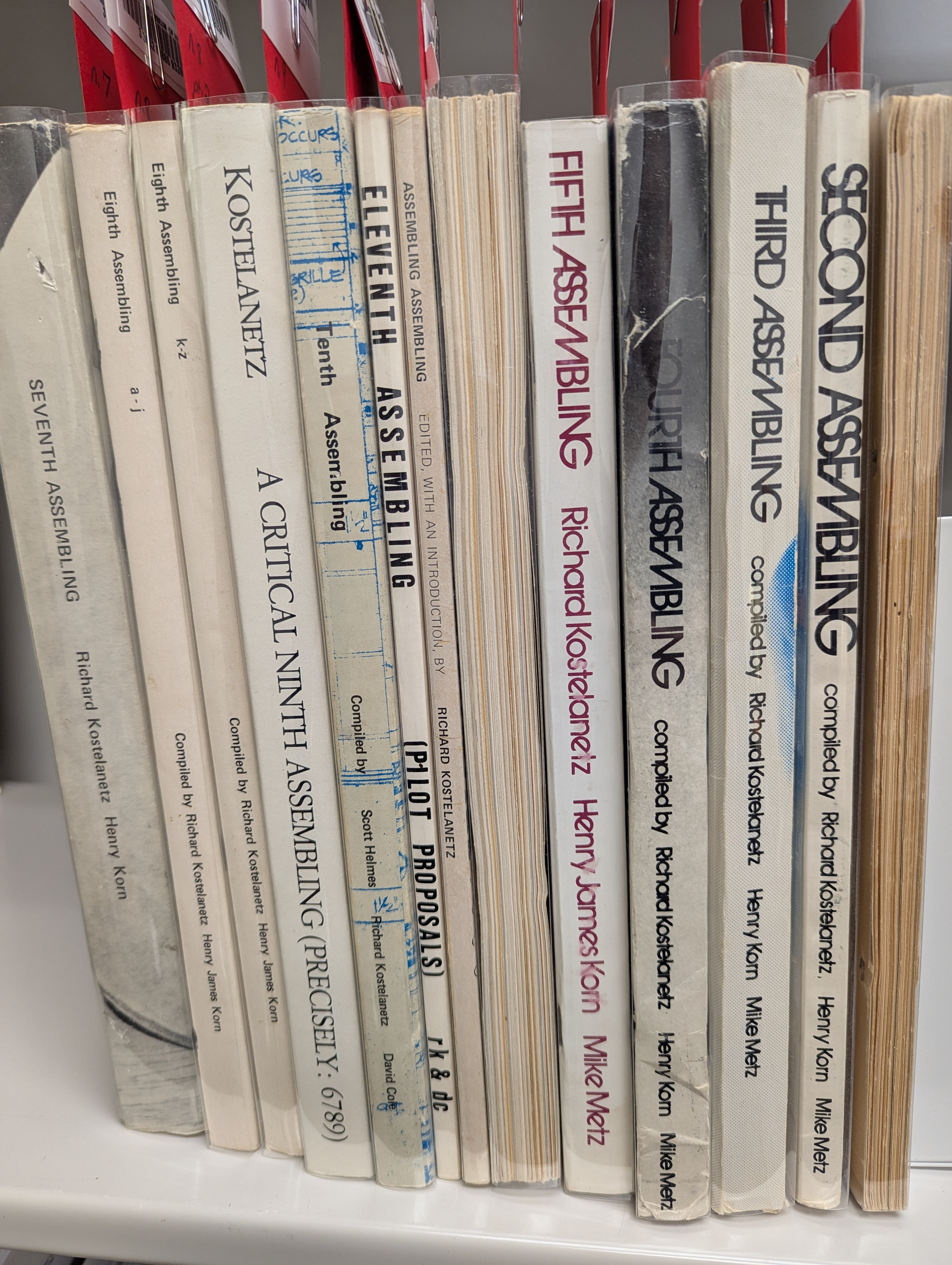
- Spines of full original run of Assembling
- Editor: Richard Kostelanetz
- Categories: Little magazine, Experimental literature
- Frequency: Annually
- Publisher: Assembling Press
- Total circulation: 1,000
- First issue: 1970
- Final issue: 1987
- Country: United States
- Based in: New York City, U.S.
- Language: English
- ISSN: 0161-8318

Assembling is an American magazine launched in 1970 as an annual publication. The full run consisted of 12 issues (issue 8 split into parts 1-3). 1,000 copies of each issue were created, three going to each person that submitted work. The remaining issues were sold to recoup the cost of compilation.

Assembling was billed as "A collection of otherwise unpublishable manuscripts." No contribution was rejected for publication. Contributors were invited to submit their work, which had to be printed at their own expense, in editions of 1,000. Submissions could be anything the contributors wanted, printed on up to four 8 1/2" x 11" pages.

The stated goal of Assembling was to "open the editorial/industrial complex to alternatives and possibilities. The short-range goal is to provide the means for unpublished and otherwise unpublishable work to see print light and to consider what other kindred spirits and spooks are doing."

Richard Kostelanetz stated he was influenced to create the magazine by other publications such as Thomas Niggl's Omnibus News and John Cage's Notations

== Contributors ==
Notable contributors have included:

- David Ignatow
- Arno Karlen
- Robert Lax
- Keith Waldrop
- Hannah Weiner
- Dan Graham
- Bernadette Mayer
- Liam O’Gallagher
- Edward Ruscha
- Alan Sondheim
- Vito Acconci
- Lee Baxandall
- Madeline Gins
- Marvin Cohen
- Russell Edson
- Raymond Federman
- Jochen Gerz
- Davi det thompson
- Ruth Jacoby
- Bern Porter
- Stan Vanderbeek
