= Laudate Deum =

2023 exhortation of Pope Francis

Laudate Deum Latin for 'Praise God' Apostolic exhortation of Pope Francis
- Signature date: 4 October 2023
- Subject: On care for the poor and Earth
- Number: 6 of 7 of the pontificate
- Text: In Latin; In English

Laudate Deum (Praise God) is an apostolic exhortation by Pope Francis, published on October 4, 2023. It was released on the 2023 Feast of St Francis Assisi as a follow-up to his 2015 encyclical Laudato si'. The text is about 8,000 words divided into 73 paragraphs.

In it, Pope Francis called for speedier action against the climate crisis and condemned climate change denial.

The apostolic exhortation, dated 4 October 2023, was officially presented the following day, with a press conference held in the Vatican Gardens.

The Vatican released the document in Italian, Belarusian, German, English, Spanish, French, Polish, Portuguese and Arabic.

It was Pope Francis' sixth apostolic exhortation, after Querida Amazonia, which was released in 2020.

== Origin and title ==
Pope Francis revealed the title of Laudate Deum during a meeting on 21 September 2023 with rectors of Catholic and public universities from throughout Latin America and the Caribbean, held in the Vatican. Laudate Deum (Praise God) is a frequent refrain in several psalms, including Psalm 148, which tells the heavens and angels and the sun and moon to praise God. The new document, as was anticipated by pope Francis at that time, was to be "a look at what has happened" since 2015 and at what still "needs to be done."

The title refers to the words of St. Francis of Assisi and to the encyclical Laudato si', which was published in 2015. "'Praise God for all his creatures,'" Laudate Deum begins. "This was the message that St. Francis of Assisi proclaimed by his life, his canticles and all his actions."

The main goal of Laudate Deum is to call, once again, on all people of goodwill, to care for the poor and for the Earth.

== Content ==
In the exhortation, Francis expresses hope that societies around the world will change their lifestyles and intensify grassroots activities aimed at reducing the negative human impact on the natural environment, to prevent even more damage to the Earth. The dramatic environmental degradation strongly affects not only the indigenous peoples, the poor, and endangered species, but also the future of all young people. He also calls on politicians and the rich to work for the common good, and not for their own profit and particular interests. Finally, the Pope emphasizes that "when human beings claim to take God's place, they become their own worst enemies".

As in Laudato Si', the Pope makes use of several quotations from assemblies of bishops held around the world, affirming, for example, the African bishops' statement that "climate change is a moral outrage. It is a tragic and striking example of structural sin".

The exhortation focuses on the urgency of addressing the climate crisis, offering insights on the current state of the global environment, the inadequacies of current responses, and proposed pathways forward. The document is divided into 6 chapters. The introduction begins by acknowledging the undeniable reality of climate change and its increasingly evident effects on the planet. Pope Francis emphasizes the anthropogenic origin of climate change and the irreversible nature of many associated catastrophes.

=== Environmental crisis ===
Laudate Deum addresses the reality of climate change and its escalating impact on the lives of all peoples. Pope Francis emphasizes the anthropogenic origin of the crisis, highlighting the irreversible nature of many effects, "at least for several hundred years". While acknowledging the limitations in fully correcting the damage, the document stresses the need for measures to prevent further harm.

The document explores resistance to the concept of and confusion surrounding climate change, identifies human causes, and outlines the damages and risks associated with the crisis. It calls for a collective acceptance of responsibility for the impact on future generations, drawing parallels with the interconnectedness revealed during the COVID-19 pandemic.

According to The New York Times, Francis' message amounted to a tacit acknowledgement that his initial appeal in Laudato si' to save the planet has gone largely unheeded.

The pope specifically noted that "emissions per individual in the United States are about two times greater than those of individuals living in China, and about seven times greater than the average of the poorest countries". He also asserted that a "broad change in the irresponsible lifestyle connected with the Western model would have a significant long-term impact".

=== Critique of the role of technology ===
Pope Francis criticizes the prevailing belief that technology and economic power alone can solve environmental problems. The exhortation calls for a reconsideration of the use of power, cautioning against excessive ambition driven by profit-centric logic, hindering genuine concern for earth.

Referencing the bishops of the United States, he states, "Climate change is one of the principal challenges facing society and the global community. The effects of climate change are borne by the most vulnerable people, whether at home or around the world."

=== Global cooperation ===
The document stresses the importance of global cooperation in addressing the climate crisis. Francis advocates for multilateral agreements and effective global organizations with the authority to ensure the global common good. Critiquing past approaches to decision-making, Laudate Deum calls for a reconfiguration of multilateralism to address inadequacies in current political mechanisms.

Pope Francis notes that "Not every increase in power represents progress for humanity", pointing to historical examples where technological progress has led to devastating consequences.

=== International political weakness ===
Section 4 of the document reviews the history of international conferences on climate change, acknowledging shortcomings in implementing agreements. It underscores the necessity of overcoming selfish posturing for the sake of the global common good.

The document asserts that "Over the decades, international conferences have been held to address the climate crisis, but they have often fallen short in implementing agreements due to the lack of effective monitoring and sanctioning mechanisms. It is crucial to overcome the selfish posturing of countries for the sake of the global common good".

Laudate Deum mentions the 2023 Conference of the Parties of the UNFCCC (COP28). Pope Francis was originally scheduled to attend the conference from December 1 to 3 (within the overall event held from November 30 to December 12, 2023), but had to cancel his trip due to health issues. The pontiff wanted to participate in some way in the discussions, according to the Holy See.

=== Spiritual motivations ===
The exhortation concludes by calling on people of all religious confessions to react to the climate crisis. Specifically addressing the catholic faithful, Pope Francis reminds them of their responsibility to care for God's creation. The document emphasizes the importance of communion and working towards reconciliation with the world.

== Reception ==
Nicole Winfield and Seth Borenstein stated that "Pope Francis shamed and challenged world leaders [...] to commit to binding targets to slow climate change before it's too late" and that "using precise scientific data, sharp diplomatic arguments and a sprinkling of theological reasoning, [...] he delivered a moral imperative for the world to transition away from fossil fuels to clean energy with measures that that are "efficient, obligatory and readily monitored."

Father Daniel Horan OFM wrote on the National Catholic Reporter that "While in the buildup to its release some people have been describing this document as a second Laudato Si' or, more colloquially, its "sequel," the pope presents this text as more of an addendum and update to his earlier encyclical." He point out that the document is "both an exhortation in the truest sense — a written or spoken message that emphatically urges someone to do something — and an apologia, a theological and rhetorical defense of truth and faith."

The new exhortation is "timely," said Tomás Insua, co-founder and executive director of the nonprofit Laudato Si' Movement, which works to foster a Catholic approach to the care of the environment. Insua, who is based in Rome, said that the pope's message underscores how "it's a deeply Christian thing to be concerned for God's beloved creation [and] deeply rooted in this very biblical love of creation."

Max Foley-Keene praised the exhortation in an article for Commonweal, calling it "an urgent cry for us to create new structures that will foster and protect these relationships".

Giorgio Parisi, a Nobel prize winning physicist who was one of the speakers at the news conference presenting Laudate Deum, stressed that it is "very important that this Apostolic Exhortation is addressed to all people of good faith" rather than just to members of the Catholic Church, "because, like the Pope has said many times, nobody can be saved alone, and we are all connected."

Writing on the National Review, conservative commentator John C. Pinheiro was critical towards the document, accusing the Pope of "resorting to apocalyptic language", of excessive trust towards institutions such as the United Nations and the World Health Organisation, pointing out that both the UN and the WHO support abortion, and of leniency towards the Chinese regime. He concluded by stating that "Pope Francis could benefit from advisers who understand metrics, numbers, and human action and exchange". In a similar vein, Stephen Moore wrote on The Washington Times that "this declaration is so filled with anti-Christian fallacies that one has to wonder whether we have a pope who is actually Catholic".

Italian traditionalist Catholic commentator Camillo Langone was extremely critical of the Pontiff, accusing him on Il Foglio of "imposing a climatist dogma" and of justifying the violent actions of radical environmentalist groups; he also compared the Pope to Müezzinzade Ali Pasha, commander of the Ottoman fleet during the Battle of Lepanto, and called for his excommunication.

== See also ==
- Laudato Si' Movement
- The Letter: A Message for our Earth (2022)
- Climate change and poverty
- Ecotheology
- Stewardship (theology)
