= Technocratic paradigm =

Technocratic paradigm may refer to:

- One of the three paradigms of computer science
- Society's reliance on technology's ability to resolve all problems, criticised by Pope Francis in his encyclical letter Laudato si'
