= Charles Harbutt =

American photographer (1935–2015)

Charles Henry Harbutt (July 29, 1935 – June 30, 2015) was an American photographer, a former president of Magnum, and full-time Associate Professor of Photography at Parsons School of Design in New York.

== Biography ==
Harbutt was born in Camden, New Jersey, and raised in Teaneck, New Jersey, and learned much of his photography skills from the township's amateur camera club. He attended Regis High School in New York City where he took photographs for the school newspaper. He later graduated from Marquette University.

Harbutt's work is deeply rooted in the modern photojournalist tradition. For the first twenty years of his career he contributed to major magazines in the United States, Europe and Japan. His work was often intrinsically political, exhibiting social and economic contingencies. In 1959, while working as a writer and photographer for the Catholic magazine Jubilee, he was invited by members of the Castro underground to document the Cuban Revolution on the strength of three photographs he had published in Modern Photography.

An editor at Jubilee while Harbutt was working there, Robert Lax, used photographs taken by Harbutt for the front and back cover of his first book of poetry, The Circus of the Sun.

Harbutt joined Magnum Photos and was elected president of the organization twice, first in 1979. He left the group in 1981, citing its increasingly commercial ambitions and the desire to pursue more personal work. He taught photography workshops, exhibited in solo and group shows around the world, and joined the faculty of the Parsons School of Design at New School University as a full-time professor, in addition to serving as guest artist at MIT, The Art Institute of Chicago, and the Rhode Island School of Design. Harbutt was a founding member of Archive Pictures Inc., an international documentary photographers' cooperative, and a member of the American Society of Magazine Photographers.

His work was exhibited at the Museum of Modern Art, the National Museum of American History, the Corcoran Gallery of Art, the U.S. Library of Congress, George Eastman House, the Art Institute of Chicago, the International Center of Photography, the Center for Creative Photography, and at the Bibliothèque Nationale, the Beaubourg, and the Maison européenne de la photographie in Paris.

In 1997, his negatives, master prints, and archives were acquired for the collection of the Center for Creative Photography in Tucson, Arizona.

He mounted a large exhibition of his work at the Centro de la Imagen in Mexico City in December 2000 and received the medal of the City of Perpignan at a retrospective of his work there in 2004. He died in Monteagle, Tennessee, on June 30, 2015, at the age of 79. He had emphysema.

== Books ==
- 1969 – "America In Crisis" Charles Harbutt, Mitchel Levitas, Lee Jones and Magnum Photos, Holt, Rinehart, and Winston, ISBN 9780030810206
- 1974 – "Travelog" Charles Harbutt, The MIT Press, ISBN 9780262580267
- 1986 – "Progreso" Charles Harbutt, Archive Pictures, ISBN 9780961757502
- 2012 – "Departures and Arrivals" Charles Harbutt, Damiani, ISBN 9788862082433
