= The Circus of the Sun =

1959 poem by Robert Lax

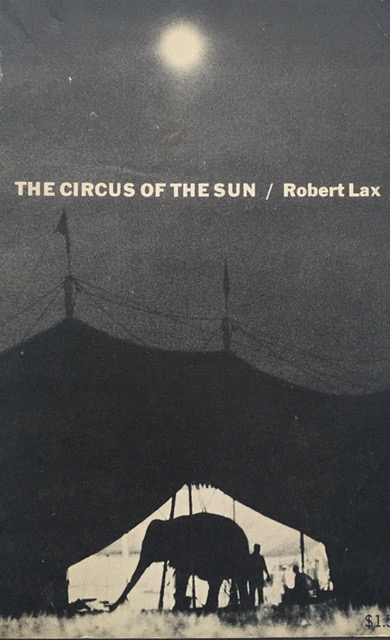
- Cover of 1960 paperback edition
- Author: Robert Lax
- Cover artist: Charles Harbutt
- Language: English
- Genre: American Poetry
- Publisher: Journeyman Press
- Publication date: 1959
- Publication place: United States
- Media type: Print (Paperback)
- Pages: 50 (first edition, paperback)
- OCLC: 801297711

"The Circus of the Sun" is a poem by American poet Robert Lax (1915–2000). First published in 1959 by Journeyman Press, it consists of a cycle of 31 short poems that tell the story of a traveling circus. The poem is included in the collections 33 Poems (1987), Love Had a Compass (1997), and Circus Days and Nights (2000).

The poem follows a day in the life of a circus as they arrive in a new town, set up, rehearse, perform, and take down the circus. It is arranged according to the phases of the day (morning, afternoon, evening, the midway, and night), which deliberately align with the canonical hours, and the title alludes to the song written by Francis of Assisi, "Canticle of the Sun."

Lax used his own experience traveling with the Cristiani Brothers Circus, where he would sometimes perform as a clown, as inspiration for the poem. In writing about the circus, Lax is able to write about theological ideas of creation and about Christian allegory.

Widely considered his best poem, it marks the conclusion of the early, lyrical phase of Lax's career before he started writing experimental, minimalist poetry.

== Background and origin ==
Lax first met the Cristiani family when his friend Leonard Robinson was sent to write a piece about the family of acrobats for the "Talk of the Town" section of The New Yorker. The Cristiani family left a lasting impression on Lax. Several years after meeting them he suggested to The New Yorker that he travel with the Cristiani family and write a "Reporter at Large" story for the magazine. In 1948 Lax was given a $500 advance for the project and spent the next month traveling with the Cristiani family and their circus. Over the next three years he would work on what would become "The Circus of the Sun."

In the summer of 1949 after having left the circus, Lax, along with his childhood friend Ad Reinhardt went to live with artist Robert Gibney and writer/editor Nancy Flagg Gibney in Henley Cay. There, Lax worked on writing his account of traveling with the circus. After Henley Cay, Lax returned to his hometown of Olean, NY and set up in the basement of the library at St Bonaventure University and worked on the poem every day. In 1950 an excerpt of "The Circus of the Sun" was published in New Story and presented as part of a forthcoming novel. When published 7 years later by Journeyman Press, the excerpt published in New Story was included, now as a poem known as "The sunset city..." Another excerpt, this time containing nearly a third of the completed poem and titled "The Circus", was published in New World Writing #13 in 1958.

After completing the poem, Lax struggled to find a publisher. Eventually Emil Antonucci, an artist who had made illustrations for "The Circus of the Sun", offered to use the money he received from a Guggenheim grant to found Journeyman Press and publish the poem. This began a lifelong collaboration between Lax and Antonucci.

== Themes and tone ==
The poem relies on several Biblical allusions to develop what Michael McGregor called an "analogy between circus and Creation." Paul Spaeth identifies the opening of "The Circus of the Sun" as a "reworking of the Genesis account of creation." While James Uebbing sees the same lines as an improvisation "on the prologue of St. John's Gospel" before calling the overall tone of the poem reticent and distinctive. Strengthening the connection between the Bible and the circus, Thomas Merton wrote that the circus was, "symbol and sacrament, cosmos and church."

In her assessment of "The Circus of the Sun" in the Encyclopedia of Catholic Literature Jeannine Mizingou writes that Lax uses the circus as a "microcosm of the universe" that "manifests variety and difference and yet a constant unity and community." McGregor supports this view of the poem when he writes, "the Cristianis remained his vision of how to live in the world as individuals and as a community." The theme of individuals and community is reinforced through the structure of the poem itself, where the poems are individual, various, and different while also unified as a whole. As Denise Levertov wrote in her 1961 review in The Nation the poem is, "not a collection of entirely separate poems but a unified book of variations on a theme." Another central theme identified by Mizingou is grace, writing that in the poem the circus is a place where, "grace enables human beings to relate to others without dominance and without violence." Mizingou's reading builds off of the way Thomas Merton saw the poem demonstrating, "the importance of human love."

== Critical reception ==
Shortly after "The Circus of the Sun" was published, E. E. Cummings, having also written poems about the circus, invited Lax over to his house to drink tea and talk about the circus. Despite the stated admiration of Cummings and many other poets, "The Circus of the Sun" was not widely reviewed, a fact lamented by Thomas McDonnell in a review of the poem published in Commonweal. In the review McDonnell goes on to call the poem a "praise of creation" and sees in it Gabriel Marcel's "concept of man's nuptial bond with being."

When the poem was reviewed, it generally received high praise. Denise Levertov writing for The Nation called the poem "dreamlike and vivid" before drawing favorable comparisons to Gerard Manley Hopkins. In a review for Stars and Stripes, William Claire said the poem evoked "the wonder and beauty of motion and people and ideas and faith...." Thomas Merton called the poem "one very fine book" in a letter to Lax. In a critical assessment of Lax's poetry, critic and poet R.C. Kenedy wrote of "The sunset city..." section: "[it] must be one of the greatest poems in the English language" and called its rhythm "the most blood-curdling... yet devised by poet." In his introduction to the collection Circus Days and Nights, Paul Spaeth quotes another appreciation penned by Kenedy referring to "The Circus of the Sun" as one of "the finest volume of poems published by an English-speaking poet of the generation which comes in the wake of T.S. Eliot." William Packard, writer and editor of New York Quarterly, called the effect of the poem "the same as... the first chapter of Genesis: there is movement and truth because there is order and purpose."

In 1984 a Canadian entertainment company adopted, for its name, a French-language version of the expression "Circus of the Sun": "Cirque du Soleil".
