= Liam O'Gallagher =

American painter (1917–2007)

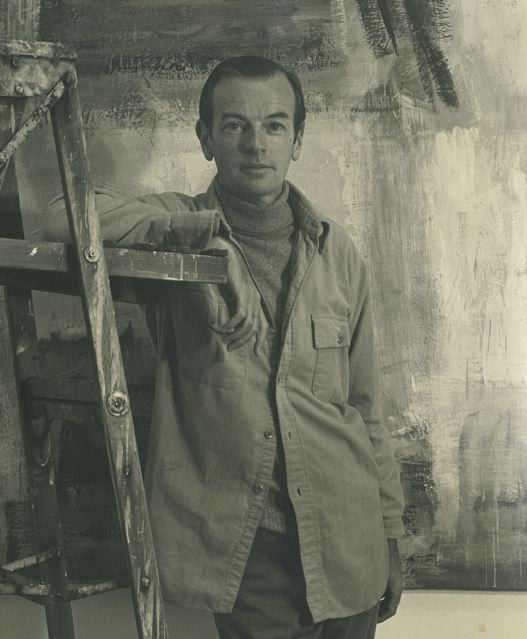
Photograph of Liam O'Gallagher, 1946

Liam O'Gallagher (October 2, 1917 – December 4, 2007) was an avant-garde sound artist, painter and teacher whose San Francisco studio became an early gathering place for Beat writers and poets in the 1950s. He was integral to the creation of foundations and centers for human growth, including Feathered Pipe Ranch, The Ojai Foundation and the Beatrice Wood Center for the Arts.

== Early life ==
Born William Gallagher in Oakland, California, the tenth of eleven children, the artist adopted the more traditional rendering of his name after visiting relatives in Ireland. Author Aldous Huxley had a major impact on O'Gallagher's life, encouraging him to pursue a career in the arts, which led to him studying with Hans Hofmann in Greenwich Village in 1946. Meeting members of the Ojai Players, a theatrical group focusing on the work of Anton Chekhov, he was invited to paint their sets at the High Valley Theatre in Ojai, California. In Ojai, he began a number of lifelong friendships with remarkable individuals including the actress Iris Tree, artist Beatrice Wood and Rosalind Rajagopal, who invited him to teach art at the recently created Happy Valley School (now the Besant Hill School of Happy Valley. Meeting the Indian philosopher J. Krishnamurti had a major impact on O'Gallagher's philosophical views, which became increasingly concerned with mystical experience and creating social change.

== Career ==
Moving to San Francisco, O' Gallagher and his life-partner Robert Rheem maintained a studio, where they created Abstract Expressionist paintings in the area's Chinatown district during the 1950s and 1960s, where they interacted with a number of artists, writers and philosophers including Richard Brautigan, Jess Collins, Robert Duncan, Lawrence Ferlinghetti, Allen Ginsberg, Jack Kerouac, Michael McClure, Jean Varda and Alan Watts. Familiar with the Beat Scene in North Beach, O'Gallagher assisted Dr. Francis J. Rigney in researching his book The Real Bohemia: A Sociological and Psychological Study of The "Beats".

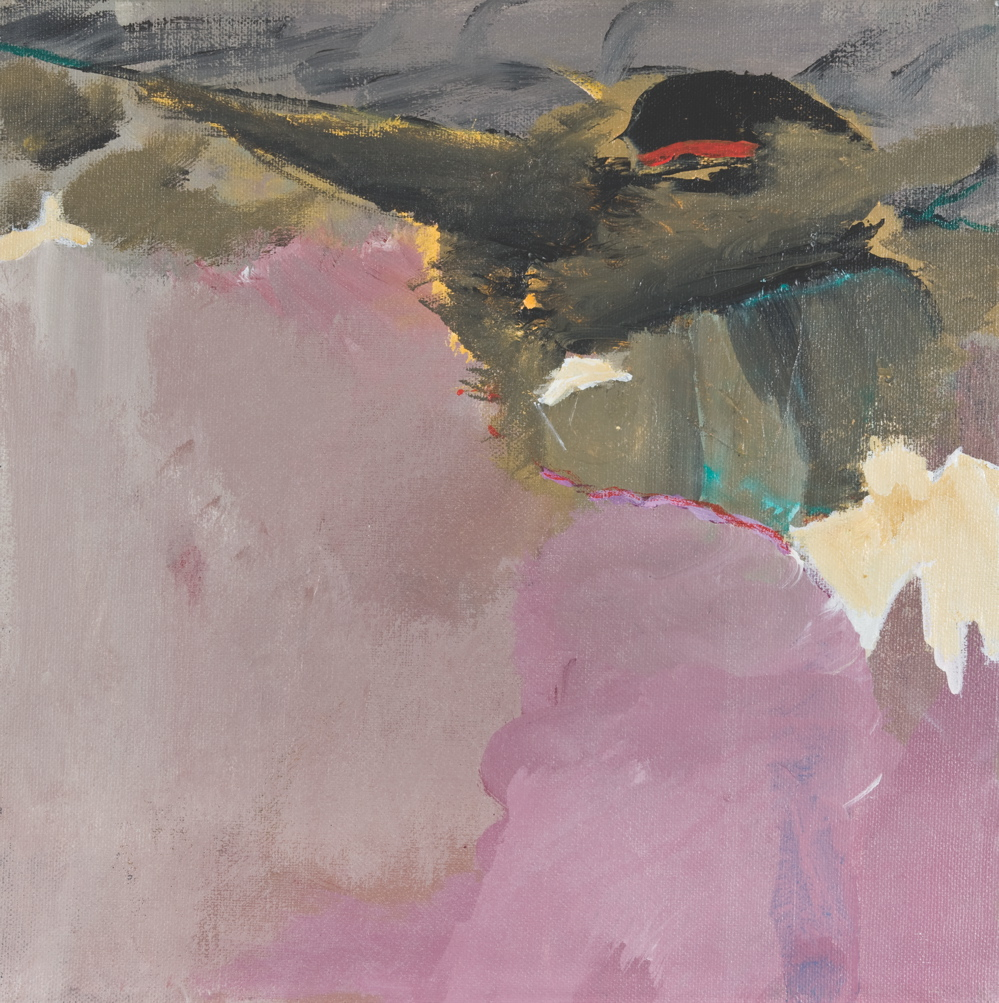
Reproduction of Untitled (Bird), A Painting by Liam O'Gallagher

== Experience with psychedelic drugs ==
Influenced by Aldous Huxley and Gerald Heard, Liam became interested in the potential of LSD and in 1959 he traveled to Mexico with Robert Rheem, Dr. Barbara Brown and Laura Huxley to visit the home of Indra Devi, where he was given a dose of the then legal drug. Having an ecstatic experience on LSD, he returned to San Francisco with an increased interest in mystical experience. In 1962, O'Gallagher tried Psilocybin and the experience was filmed by Michael McClure and later used in a film titled Chinatown Trip, created by Kevin Wallace. Despite his belief that both experiences were positive and expanded his consciousness, O'Gallagher never took any form of recreational drug again and cautioned others about doing so.

== Beyond painting ==
In 1963, O'Gallagher was invited to the Marcel Duchamp retrospective exhibition at the Pasadena Art Museum, as well as the private party that followed, where he met Duchamp along with Andy Warhol, whose first gallery exhibition in Los Angeles coincided with the event. Duchamp would prove a major influence on O'Gallagher's work and the friendship with Warhol continued. In 1966, when Warhol's Exploding Plastic Inevitable travelled to San Francisco, O'Gallagher and Rheem threw a party for the group, attended by Warhol and members of the Velvet Underground. In the late 1960s, O'Gallagher felt that the future of art was concerned with new technologies as opposed to painting. He was also writing a great deal and published Planet Noise, a book of poetry that utilized the "cut-up" method he'd learned from William Burroughs and was published in a number of international magazines. He experimented with alternative printing processes, happenings and sound experiments. In 1969, he collaborated with pioneering choreographer Anna Halprin on Ceremony of Us, which featured African-American dancers from the Watts neighborhood of Los Angeles and dancers from Halprin's San Francisco Dancers' Workshop, who were primarily white. Ceremony of Us premiered at the Mark Taper Forum in Los Angeles and resulted in a record by Charles Amirkanian and O'Gallagher, funded by Jim Newman's Dilexi Gallery.

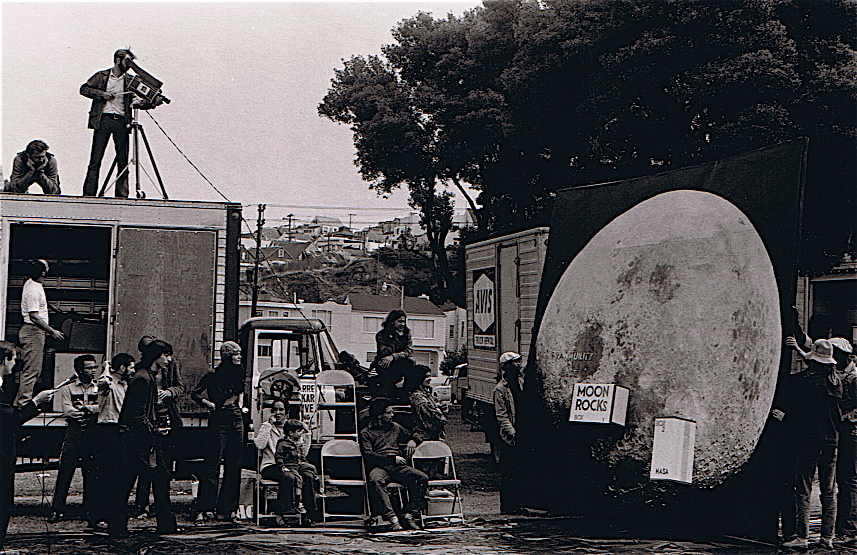
Return Trip event at Precita Park, San Francisco, 1969

In 1972, O'Gallagher's The Blue Planet Notebooks was published, which featured prose, poetry, graphics, collage and experiments with creating art utilizing computers. In the book's introduction, artist, writer and critic Richard Kostelanetz wrote, "Liam O'Gallagher is a genuine polyartist, whose adventurous imagination has already moved through several media and will probably pioneer a few more. It is characteristic that he should be, if only 'in passing' one of the finest visual poets ever seen in America. He takes deep walks in all kinds of space, both inner and outer, artistic and socio-futurological, implicitly instigating jumps in time."

== Centers for human growth ==
In the early 1970s, O'Gallagher turned his attention to creating social change through bringing like-minded people together. He was central in creating Feathered Pipe Ranch, working with Jermaine "Jerry" Duncan and India Supera. Arranging the sale of Bear Creek Lodge, which had belonged to Robert Rheem's parents, he assisted in transforming it into a center for human growth, with Feathered Pipe Ranch evolving into an early yoga center. In 1973, O'Gallagher and Rheem returned to Ojai, transforming the former High Valley Theater into a home and studio and spending time with their friends Rosalind Rajagopal and Beatrice Wood. He convinced Rajagopal to make land available for a new venture, which was originally connected with The Human Dimensions Institute, but evolved into the Ojai Foundation when he brought Joan Halifax from New York City to become its director. Following the death of Beatrice Wood in 1998, O'Gallagher and Rheem were central to the creation of the Beatrice Wood Center for the Arts in the artist's former home.

== Later work ==
In the mid-1980s, O'Gallagher and Rheem settled in Santa Barbara, California, where O'Gallagher began a series of smaller canvases that were highly original, yet still concerned with non-objective painting. He wrote poetry, conceptualized a multi-media work titled The 4th World and a set of cards titled Point of Departure. This work continued until his death, at which time the paintings and his intellectual property were given to the Beatrice Wood Center for the Arts, which has since featured the work in annual presentations.
