= Ali al-Khawas =

9th-century Sufi Muslim poet and mystic

Ali al-Khawas was a 9th-century Muslim Sufi poet and mystic from the ninth century AD. Pope Francis refers to him as a "spiritual writer" in his encyclical letter Laudato si' (2015) on the topic of ecology.

== Teaching ==
In Laudato si', Francis writes that humanity can "discover God in all things": "in a leaf, in a mountain trail, in a dewdrop, in a poor person’s face". In a footnote, he refers to al-Khawas' experience of God and the world, noting how the poet stressed "the need not to put too much distance between the creatures of the world and the interior experience of God". The footnote reads

The spiritual writer Ali al-Khawas stresses from his own experience the need not to put too much distance between the creatures of the world and the interior experience of God. As he puts it: "Prejudice should not have us criticize those who seek ecstasy in music or poetry. There is a subtle mystery in each of the movements and sounds of this world. The initiate will capture what is being said when the wind blows, the trees sway, water flows, flies buzz, doors creak, birds sing, or in the sound of strings or flutes, the sighs of the sick, the groans of the afflicted ..."

Aisha Bhoori has noted that it is "unusual for a pope to cite a Sufi poet".
