= Ruth Jacobsen =

American artist (1932–2019)

- Born: 8 April 1932; Frankenberg, Germany
- Died: 19 February 2019 (aged 86); Southampton, New York
- Known for: Painting, Writing
- Spouse: Christine Epifania

Ruth Jacobsen (8 April 1932 – 19 February 2019) was a German-born lesbian artist and a Hidden Child of the Holocaust. During the Second World War, she fled with her parents to the Netherlands, where she was hidden by the Dutch resistance until she was reunited with her parents towards the end of the war. Traumatized by the war, her parents both committed suicide. In 1953, she emigrated to the United States to stay with distant family and there became a textiles designer. Working as the first female film projectionist in New York, she helped create a training program for women entering that profession. Jacobsen increasingly devoted her time to art using family letters and photographs in order to cope with her childhood traumas. She is remembered in particular for her collage works centred on the Holocaust.

== Biography ==
Born in Frankenberg, Germany, on 8 April 1932, Ruth Jacobsen was the daughter of Walter Jacobsen and his wife Paula. Faced with the persecution of the Jews by the Nazis, the family fled to the Netherlands in 1939, settling in the village of Oud-Zuilen. In 1942, relying on the assistance of the Dutch resistance, they were forced into hiding but two months later Ruth Jacobsen was hidden away from her parents in various Christian families.

She was reunited with her parents at the end of the war but, traumatized by their experiences, both committed suicide. In 1953, Ruth emigrated to the United States where she lived with distant relatives. After first working as textile designer, she became the first woman to be employed as a film projectionist in New York City. She devoted her spare time to developing her artistic talents, concentrating on collage works. These centred on the Holocaust, the 1980s AIDS crisis and indigenous rights. On her retirement she turned to art, creating many art works and collages compiled with items she found in letters and photographs which had been saved by a Christian family living in Germany.

It was reported that thanks to her writing and artwork she was able to reclaim herself. Ursula Hegi, a German-born novelist and Holocaust specialist, commented: "Her legacy is significant, certainly to her life but beyond that to world history, evoking the legacy of another child hidden in Holland — Anne Frank, who gave the world the girl’s perspective of the hidden child... Ruth Jacobsen gives us both the girl's perspective and the woman's perspective." Her book Rescued Images (2001) is based on a series of collages from photographs in an old family album. Her devastating childhood is brought back to life, reviving memories she had long suppressed.

Ruth Jacobsen died in Southampton, New York on 19 February 2019. She had lived there for more than three decades with her wife Christine Epifania who died in 2017.

Jacobsen's papers are in the collection of the Center for Jewish History. A 1992 oral history by Jacobsen is in the U.S. Holocaust Memorial Museum.
