= The Letter: A Message for Our Earth =

2022 documentary film about Laudato Si'

The Letter: A Message for our Earth
- Directed by: Nicolas Brown
- Based on: Laudato si'
- Produced by: Off The Fence Productions
- Starring: Pope Francis; Raniero Cantalamessa; Lorna Gold; Ridhima Pandey; Arouna Kande; Cacique Dadá; Greg Asner; Robin Martin
- Music by: William Goodchild
- Distributed by: YouTube Originals
- Release date: 4 October 2022 (Rome)
- Running time: 80 minutes
- Country: United Kingdom
- Language: English

The Letter: A Message for our Earth is a 2022 documentary film presented by YouTube Originals, telling the story of the Laudato Si' encyclical by Pope Francis.

The film was produced by Oscar-winning Off The Fence Productions and directed by Nicolas Brown, in partnership with the Laudato Si' Movement.

Its global premiere happened in Vatican City on 4 October 2022. High-level speakers such as Hoesung Lee, Director of the Intergovernmental Panel on Climate Change, and Cardinal Michael Czerny, Prefect of the Dicastery for Integral Human Development, spoke in the premiere's press conference.

The film was an instant success amassing over 7 million views in its first two weeks, with the support of celebrities such as Leonardo DiCaprio and Arnold Schwarzenegger who promoted it on their social media accounts.

== Plot ==
Besides starring Pope Francis, the film features environmental champions from around the world, from different faiths and worldviews. Each represents an unheard voice in conversations on the planetary crisis. These are the voices of the Indigenous, the young, the poor, and wildlife.

The film follows their journeys from the Amazon, India, Senegal, and Hawai’i to the Vatican. They meet Pope Francis, who shares his vision in beautifully human interactions. They find new hope for Earth in one another.

== Cast ==
- Pope Francis
- Raniero Cantalamessa
- Lorna Gold
- Ridhima Pandey
- Arouna Kande
- Cacique Dadá
- Greg Asner
- Robin Martin
