= Marvin Cohen (American writer) =

American poet (1931–2025)

- Born: July 6, 1931; Brooklyn, New York, U.S.
- Died: March 15, 2025 (aged 93); Brooklyn, New York, U.S.
- Occupations: Essayist; novelist; playwright; poet; humorist
- Writing career
- Language: English
- Years active: 1960–2025
- Notable works: The Self-Devoted Friend (1967), The Monday Rhetoric of the Love Club and Other Parables (1973), Baseball the Beautiful: Decoding the Diamond (1974), Others, Including Morstive Sternbump (1976)
- Website: marvincohen.net

Marvin Cohen (July 6, 1931 – March 15, 2025) was an American essayist, novelist, playwright, poet, humorist, and surrealist. He was the author of numerous books, two of which were published by New Directions Publishing, and several plays. His shorter writings — stories, parables, allegories, and essays — have appeared in more than 80 publications, including The New Yorker, The New York Times, The Village Voice, The Nation, Harper's Bazaar, Vogue, Fiction, The Hudson Review, Quarterly Review of Literature, Transatlantic Review and New Directions annuals. His 1980 play The Don Juan and the Non-Don Juan was first performed at the New York Shakespeare Festival as part of the Poets at the Public Series. Staged readings of the play have featured actors Richard Dreyfuss, Keith Carradine, Wallace Shawn, Jill Eikenberry, Larry Pine, and Mimi Kennedy.

== Life and career ==
Cohen was born in Brooklyn, New York City. He described himself as one who has "risen from lower-class background to lower-class foreground." He studied art at Cooper Union but left college to focus on writing. He supported himself with a series of odd jobs including as a mink farmer and merchant seaman. Although not typically associated with the Beat Generation, his first published piece appeared in The Beat Scene (Corinth Books, 1960) along with works by Jack Kerouac, Allen Ginsberg, Gregory Corso, and Lawrence Ferlinghetti. Cohen also taught creative writing at The New School, the City College of New York, C.W. Post of Long Island University, and Adelphi University.

Cohen died on March 15, 2025, at the age of 93.

== Works ==
Books

- The Self-Devoted Friend (1967) New Directions Publishing/Rapp & Whiting
- Dialogues (1967) Turret Books
- The Monday Rhetoric of the Love Club and Other Parables (1973) New Directions Publishing/Rapp & Whiting
- Baseball the Beautiful: Decoding the Diamond (1974) Links Books
- Fables at Life's Expense (1975) Serendipity Books
- Others, Including Morstive Sternbump (1976) Bobbs-Merrill Company
- The Inconvenience of Living (1977) Urizen Books
- How the Snake Emerged from the Bamboo Pole but Man Emerged from Both (1978) Oasis Books / Earthgrip Press
- Aesthetics in Life and Art (1982) Gull Books
- How to Outthink a Wall: An Anthology (2016) Verbivoracious Press
- Others, Including Morstive Sternbump: 40th Anniversary Edition (2016) Tough Poets Press
- The Self-Devoted Friend: 50th Anniversary Edition (2017) Tough Poets Press
- Baseball as Metaphysics (2017) Tough Poets Press
- Five Fictions (2018) Tough Poets Press
- Inside the World: As Al Lehman (2018) Sagging Meniscus Press
- Women, and Tom Gervasi (2018) Sagging Meniscus Press
- Run Out of Prose (2018) Sagging Meniscus Press
- Sadness Corrected: New Poems & Dialogues (2019) Sagging Meniscus Press
- Life's Tumultuous Party: Reduced to its Essential Partycycles (2020) Sagging Meniscus Press
- Plays on Words (2020) Tough Poets Press
- Conversations and Versifications (2021) Tough Poets Press
- Questions to Ask Before Proceeding (2021) Tough Poets Press
- The Hard Life of a Stone and Other Thoughts (2021) Sagging Meniscus Press
- Booboo Roi (2021) Sagging Meniscus Press
- How, Upon Reflection, To Be Amorous (2021) Sagging Meniscus Press
- Trying to Fool Death (2023) Tough Poets Press
- Loving Candace (2024) Sagging Meniscus Press
- Pete, the Photographer & Other Impressions (2025) Tough Poets Press

Plays

- The Don Juan and the Non-Don Juan (1980)
- Reasonable Resignation (1981)
- Necessary Ends (1982)
- Anti-Nuclear Love (or Love Unfairly Tested) (1982)
- Phonies (1982)
- Spiritualistically Predestined Judy, Yes, But Which One? (1982)
- Topsy-Turvy (1985)
