= Boris Kostelanetz =

Russian-American tax lawyer (1911–2006)

- Born: June 16, 1911; St. Petersburg, Russia
- Died: January 31, 2006 (aged 94)
- Occupation: Tax lawyer

Boris Kostelanetz (16 June 1911 – 31 January 2006) was a leading tax lawyer.

== Childhood ==
Boris Kostelanetz born in St. Petersburg, Russia on June 16, 1911, to a wealthy Jewish family. Following the Russian Revolution of 1917, Boris and his family moved to New York City in 1920.

== Career ==
He began as an accountant at Price Waterhouse in 1933. Attended St. John's University Law School. After graduation, he got a position at the Attorney General's office, Boris was a special assistant to the Attorney General in 1939. He help expose the link between the mob and the movie industry and lead to the conviction of some criminal figures. Boris Kostelanetz was appointed to chief of the war frauds section in Justice Department shortly afterwards. Kostelanetz was also a trustee for New York University and also president of the New York County Lawyer's Association and chairman of the character and fitness committee of the Appellate Division. Boris Kostelanetz died on January 31, 2006.

== Family ==
- Brother of orchestral conductor Andre Kostelanetz
- Richard Kostelanetz, his son, is a well-known artist, author and critic
