= Richard Kostelanetz =

American artist, author, and critic (born 1940)

Richard Cory Kostelanetz (born May 14, 1940) is an American artist, author, and critic.

== Birth and education ==
Kostelanetz was born to Boris Kostelanetz and Ethel Cory and is the nephew of the conductor Andre Kostelanetz. He has a B.A. (1962) from Brown University and an M.A. (1966) in American History from Columbia University under Woodrow Wilson, NYS Regents, and International Fellowships; he also studied at King's College London as a Fulbright Scholar during 1964-1965.

He is the recipient of grants from the Guggenheim Foundation (1967), Pulitzer Foundation (1965), the DAAD Berliner Kunstlerprogramm (1981–1983), Vogelstein Foundation (1980), Fund for Investigative Journalism (1981), Pollock-Krasner Foundation (2001), CCLM (1981), ASCAP (1983 annually to the present), American Public Radio Program Fund (1984), and the National Endowment for the Arts with ten individual awards (1976, 1978, 1979, 1981, 1982, 1983, 1985, 1986, 1990, 1991). He also assumed production residencies at the Electronic Music Studio of Stockholm, Experimental TV Center (Owego, NY), Mishkenot Sha'ananim (Jerusalem), and the MIT Media Lab.

== Works ==
Kostelanetz came onto the literary scene with essays in quarterlies such as Partisan Review and The Hudson Review, then profiles of older artists, musicians and writers for The New York Times Magazine; these profiles were collected in Master Minds (1969).

His book The End of Intelligent Writing: Literary Politics in America (1974) caused considerable controversy. SoHo: The Rise and Fall of an Artists' Colony (2003) chronicles cultural life in New York City in the late 20th century. In 1967, he signed the "Writers and Editors War Tax Protest", vowing to refuse to pay taxes raised to fund the Vietnam War.

Books of his radically alternative fiction include In the Beginning (1971) (the alphabet arranged in single and double letter combinations), Short Fictions (1974), More Short Fictions (1980, and Furtherest Fictions (2007)); of his mostly visual poetry, Visual Language (1970), I Articulations (1974), Wordworks (1993), and More Wordworks (2006).

Among the anthologies he has edited are On Contemporary Literature (1964, 1969), Beyond Left & Right (1968), John Cage (1970, 1991), Moholy-Nagy (1970), Breakthrough Fictioneers (1973), Scenarios (1980), and The Literature of SoHo (1981).

A political anarchist-libertarian, he authored Political Essays (1999) and Toward Secession: More Political Essays (2008) and has since 1987 been a contributing editor for Liberty. In 1973 he was one of the signers of the Humanist Manifesto II.

Kostelanetz was the creator and editor of Assembling magazine. A Little Magazine composed of creator submitted "unpublishable manuscripts" in editions of 1,000. The magazine ran annually from 1970 to 1987 (the final issue had different editors).

== Media ==
Among his literary contemporaries, Richard Kostelanetz has also produced literature in audio, video, holography, prints, book-art, computer-based installations, among other new media. Though he coined the term "polyartist" to characterize people who excel at two or more nonadjacent arts, he considers that, since nearly all his creative work incorporates language or literary forms, it represents Writing reflecting polyartistry. "Wordsand" (1978–1981) was a traveling early retrospective of his work in several media.

== Bibliography ==
- "A Critical Look at the Critics", Twentieth Century ( essay, Spring 1966)
- The Theatre of Mixed Means (1968)
- Master Minds (1969)
- Visual Language (1970)
- In the Beginning (1971, novel)
- Recyclings, Volume One (1974)
- The End of Intelligent Writing: Literary Politics in America (1974, criticism)
- I Articulations/Short Fictions (1974)
- Openings & Closings (1975)
- Portraits from Memory (1975)
- Constructs (1975)
- Illuminations (1977)
- One Night Stood (1977)
- Wordsand (1978)
- Constructs Two (1978)
- And So Forth (1979)
- Exhaustive Parallel Intervals (1979)
- "The End" Appendix/"The End" Essentials (1979)
- Twenties in the Sixties (1979)
- Metamorphosis in the Arts (1980)
- More Short Fictions (1980)
- Reincarnations (1981)
- The Old Poetries and the New (1981)
- Autobiographies (1981)
- Invocations (Folkways Records, 1983)
- American Imaginations (1983)
- Epiphanies (1983)
- Recyclings: A Literary Autobiography (1984)
- Autobiographien New York Berlin (1986)
- Prose Pieces/Aftertexts (1987)
- The Old Fictions and the New (1987)
- Conversing with Cage (1988) (second ed., 2003), a collage of interviews with John Cage.
- On Innovative Music(ian)s (1989)
- Unfinished Business: An Intellectual Nonhistory, 1963–89 (1990)
- The New Poetries and Some Olds (1991)
- Politics in the African-American Novel (1991, criticism)
- Solos, Duets, Trios & Choruses (1991)
- Published Encomia 1967–91 (1991)
- On Innovative Art(ist)s (1992)
- Wordworks: Poems New & Selected (1993)
- A Dictionary of the Avant-Gardes (1993)
- On Innovative Performance(s) (1994)
- Minimal Fictions (1994)
- An ABC of Contemporary Reading (1995)
- Fillmore East: Recollections of Rock Theater (1995)
- One Million Words of Booknotes, 1959–93 (1995)
- Radio Writing (1995)
- Crimes of Culture (1995)
- John Cage Ex(plain)ed (1996)
- Thirty-Five Years of Critical Engagements with John Cage (1996)
- Ecce Kosti (1996)
- Vocal Shorts: Collected Performance Texts (1998)
- 3-Element Stories (1998)
- Political Essays (1999)
- SoHo: The Rise and Fall of an Artists' Colony (2003)
- Autobiographies at 60 (2004)
- Thirty-Five Years of Visible Writing (2004)
- Film & Video: Alternative Views (2005)
- Ghosts (2005)
- More Wordworks (2006)
- Autobiographies at 50 (2006)
- Home & Away: Travel Essays (2006)
- Book-Art, Anthologies, & Alternative Publishing (2006)
- On Sports & Sportsmen (2006)
- The Maturity of American Thought (2006)
- Furtherest Fictions (2007)
- Vertical Single-Sentence Stories (2007)
- Toward Secession (2007)
- The Art of Radio in North America (2008)
- Skeptical Critiques (2009)
- Innumerable chapbooks and editions of poetry, fiction, and innovative prose.

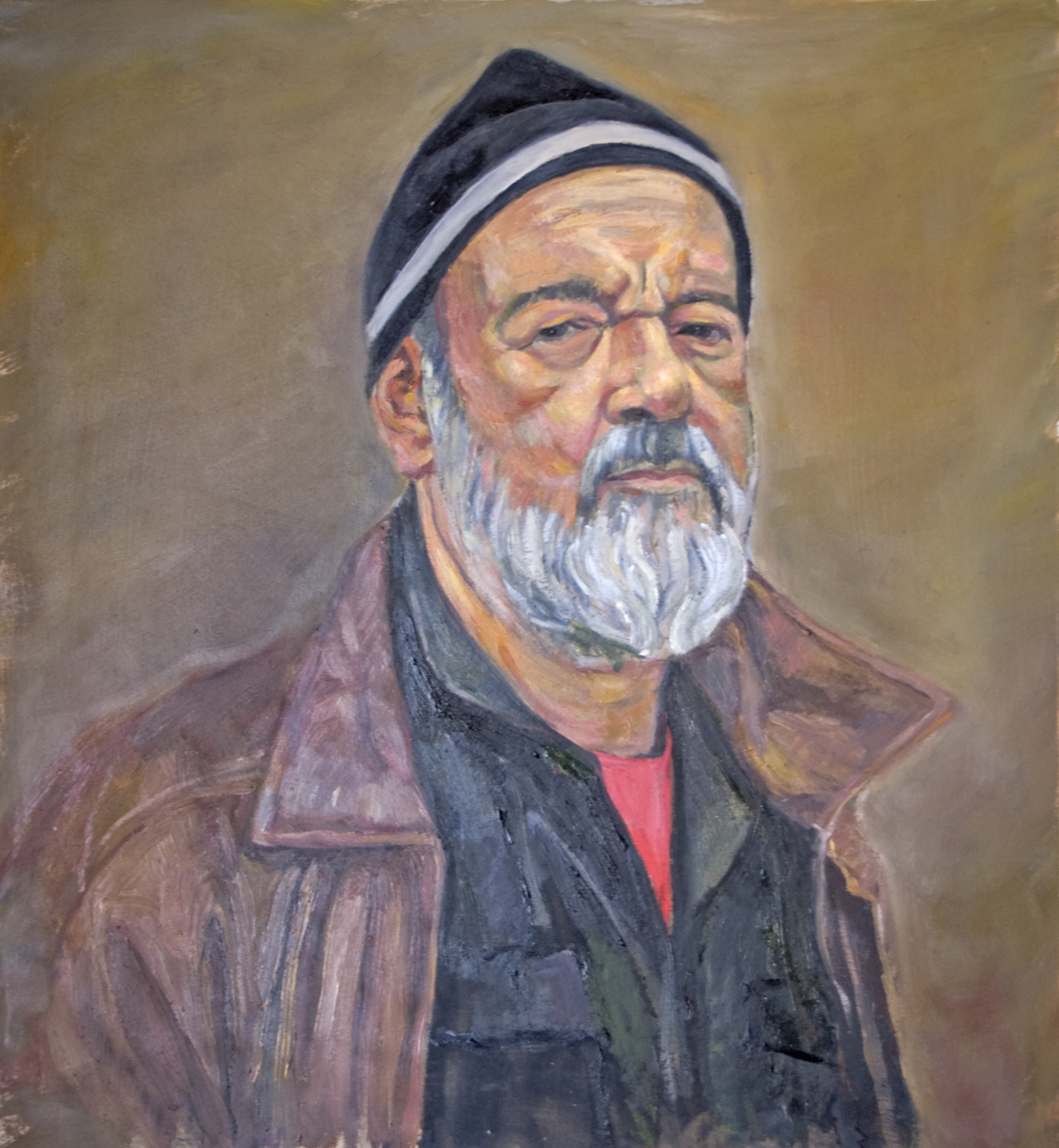
Richard Kostelanetz. Portrait by Leonid Drozner.2009
