= Canticle of the Sun =

Religious song

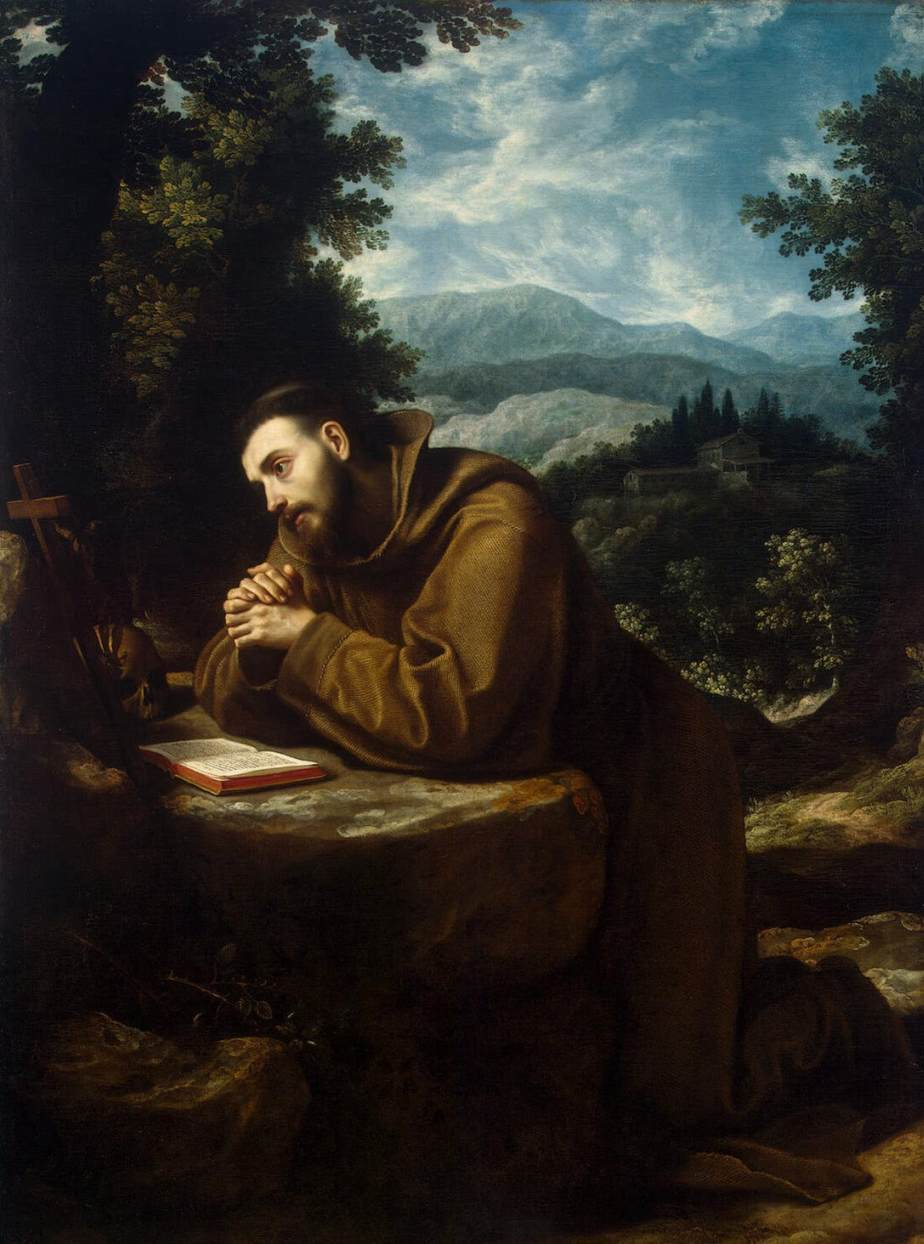
Saint Francis of Assisi, Cigoli, c. 1600

The Canticle of the Sun, also known as the Canticle of the Creatures and, in Latin, as Laudes Creaturarum (Praise of the Creatures), is a religious song composed by Saint Francis of Assisi in San Damiano, Assisi, and (for the last two stanzas) in the Vescovado.

It was written in an Umbrian dialect of Italian but has since been translated into many languages. It is believed to be the first work of literature written in the Italian language with a known author.

== Overview ==
The Canticle of the Sun in its praise of God thanks Him for such creations as "Brother Fire" and "Sister Water". It is an affirmation of Francis' personal theology as he often referred to animals as brothers and sisters to Mankind, rejected material accumulation and sensual comforts in favor of "Lady Poverty".

Saint Francis is said to have composed most of the canticle in late 1224 while recovering from an illness at San Damiano, in a small cottage that had been built for him by Saint Clare and other women of her Order of Poor Ladies. According to tradition, the first time it was sung in its entirety was by Francis and Brothers Angelo and Leo, two of his original companions, on Francis' deathbed, the final verse praising "Sister Death" having been added only a few minutes before.

A legend which emphasizes the topos of "brightness" says he did not physically write the Canticle, because of his blindness from an eye disease; but he dictated it and he did it looking at Nature through the eye of the mind. Father Eric Doyle wrote: "Though physically blind, he was able to see more clearly than ever with the inner eye of his mind. With unparalleled clarity he perceived the basic unity of all creation and his own place as a friar in the midst of God's creatures. His unqualified love of all creatures, great and small, had grown into unity in his own heart. He was so open to reality that it found a place to be at home in his heart and he was at home everywhere and anywhere. He was a centre of communion with all creatures".

The Canticle of the Sun is first mentioned in the Vita Prima of Thomas of Celano in 1228.

== Text and translation ==
Original text in Umbrian dialect:

Altissimu, omnipotente bon Signore,
Tue so le laude, la gloria e l'honore et onne benedictione.

Ad Te solo, Altissimo, se konfano,
et nullu homo ène dignu te mentouare.

Laudato sie, mi Signore cum tucte le Tue creature,
spetialmente messor lo frate Sole,
lo qual è iorno, et allumini noi per lui.
Et ellu è bellu e radiante cum grande splendore:
de Te, Altissimo, porta significatione.

Laudato si, mi Signore, per sora Luna e le stelle:
in celu l'ài formate clarite et pretiose et belle.

Laudato si, mi Signore, per frate Uento
et per aere et nubilo et sereno et onne tempo,
per lo quale, a le Tue creature dài sustentamento.

Laudato si, mi Signore, per sor'Acqua,
la quale è multo utile et humile et pretiosa et casta.

Laudato si, mi Signore, per frate Focu,
per lo quale ennallumini la nocte:
ed ello è bello et iucundo et robustoso et forte.

Laudato si, mi Signore, per sora nostra matre Terra,
la quale ne sustenta et gouerna,
et produce diuersi fructi con coloriti fior et herba.

Laudato si, mi Signore, per quelli ke perdonano per lo Tuo amore
et sostengono infirmitate et tribulatione.

Beati quelli ke 'l sosterranno in pace,
ka da Te, Altissimo, sirano incoronati.

Laudato si mi Signore, per sora nostra Morte corporale,
da la quale nullu homo uiuente pò skappare:
guai a quelli ke morrano ne le peccata mortali;
beati quelli ke trouarà ne le Tue sanctissime uoluntati,
ka la morte secunda no 'l farrà male.

Laudate et benedicete mi Signore et rengratiate
e seruiteli cum grande humilitate.

Notes: so=sono, si=sii (be!), mi=mio, ka=perché, u and v are both written as u, sirano=saranno

English Translation:

The Highest, all powerful, good Lord,
Yours are the praises, the glory, the honour, and all blessing.

To You alone, The Highest, do they belong,
and no man is worthy to mention Your name.

Be praised, my Lord, through all your creatures,
especially Sir Brother Sun,
who brings the day; and you give light through him.
And he is beautiful and radiant in all his splendour!
Of you, The Highest, he bears the likeness.

Praised be You, my Lord, through Sister Moon and the stars,
in heaven you formed them clear and precious and beautiful.

Praised be You, my Lord, through Brother Wind,
and through the air, cloudy and serene,
and every kind of weather through which you give sustenance to Your creatures.

Praised be You, my Lord, through Sister Water,
which is very useful and humble and precious and chaste.

Praised be You, my Lord, through Brother Fire,
through whom you light the night and he is beautiful
and playful and robust and strong.

Praised be You, my Lord, through Sister Mother Earth,
who sustains us and governs us and who produces
varied fruits with coloured flowers and herbs.

Praised be You, my Lord, through those who give pardon for Your love,
and bear infirmity and tribulation.

Blessed are those who endure in peace
for by You, The Highest, they shall be crowned.

Praised be You, my Lord, through our Sister Bodily Death,
from whom no living man can escape.
Woe to those who die in mortal sin.
Blessed are those who will find Your most holy will,
for the second death shall do them no harm.

Praise and bless my Lord, and give Him thanks and serve Him with great humility.

== Influence and alternative versions ==
Reproduction of the Codice 338, f.f. 33r - 34r, sec. XIII - Biblioteca del Sacro Convento

- Franz Liszt (1811–1886) composed several pieces titled "Cantico del sol di Francesco d'Assisi", with versions for solo piano, organ, and orchestra, composed or arranged between 1862 and 1882.
- The hymn "All Creatures of Our God and King" contains a paraphrase of Saint Francis' song by William H. Draper (1855–1933). Draper set the words to the 17th-century German hymn tune "Lasst uns erfreuen", for use at a children's choir festival sometime between 1899 and 1919.
- Catalan visual artist Joan Miró, working on Mallorca, produced a series of abstract pictures, each inspired by, and quoting, a verse from the Canticle of the Sun by Francis of Assisi.
- American poet Robert Lax titled his 1959 poem "The Circus of the Sun" in tribute to The Canticle.
- San Francisco organist-composer Richard Purvis, who presided at Grace Cathedral, wrote a St. Francis Suite in 1964 which featured Canticle of the Sun as its concluding movement.
- British composer Howard Blake composed a setting (as "The Song of St Francis") in 1977.
- Polish composer Maciej Prochaska in 2025 composed an oratorio entitled Canticle of the Sun (to celebrate its 800th anniversary), which was first performed in October 2025 in the Franciscan Church of St. Anthony of Padua in Poznań, Poland.

== See also ==
- Benedicite
- The Circus of the Sun
- Cirque du Soleil
- Great Hymn to the Aten
- Laudato Si'
