= Laudato Si' Movement =

Global Catholic climate and justice network

Laudato Si' Movement (LSM) is a global network of over 900 Catholic organizations and over 10,000 trained grassroots leaders known as Laudato Si' Animators. Inspired by the Laudato si' encyclical of Pope Francis, LSM's stated mission is to "inspire and mobilize the Catholic community to care for our common home and achieve climate and ecological justice".

== History ==
Sponsored by Cardinal Luis Antonio Tagle, the movement was founded in the Philippines in January 2015, when Pope Francis arrived in Manila. Its original name, Global Catholic Climate Movement, was changed to the Laudato Si' Movement in 2021 to better reflect its mission.

LSM has played a key role in supporting the church to receive and implement the Laudato si' encyclical. In partnership with the Vatican's Dicastery for Promoting Integral Human Development, the Laudato Si' Movement convenes various global initiatives to raise awareness and spark Catholic environmental action, such as:

- the annual Laudato Si' Week celebration, held most recently in May 2022.
- the Season of Creation ecumenical celebration, held during the period from 1 September to 4 October each year, (Note: The Season of Creation was established by Ecumenical Patriarch Dimitrios I in 1989. 1 September was initially declared to be an Orthodox Day of Prayer for Creation. The World Council of Churches subsequently extended the celebration to 4 October, the feast day of St. Francis of Assisi, patron saint of the environment.) and
- the documentary film The Letter: A Message for our Earth, freely available online.

LSM has also spearheaded other initiatives such as the Laudato Si' Animators training, and record-breaking participation of Catholic institutions in the Fossil fuel divestment campaign.

In the Jubilee Year 2025, LSM started to celebrate the 10th anniversary of the encyclical Laudato si' and the 800th anniversary of St. Francis of Assisi's song Canticle of the Sun, from which the pope's encyclical draws its name. In January, the Scottish climate activist Lorna Gold – a founding member of LSM – was named its new executive director. The Movement then consisted of more than 900 member organizations in 192 countries, over 70 chapters, and about 20,000 LS animators. Earlier, she also featured in the film "The Letter", which led to a vast expansion of the network.

== Assisi ==
LSM has a center in Assisi, coordinating the project "Assisi: Terra Laudato Si'", which connects various Franciscan sites to tell the story of the Canticle of the Sun (also known as the Canticle of the Creatures) and Laudato si'. The project was announced by Bishop Domenico Sorrentino and blessed by the Vatican's Cardinal Czerny in a Pentecost ceremony in May 2023.

== Regional and local activities ==
=== Poland ===
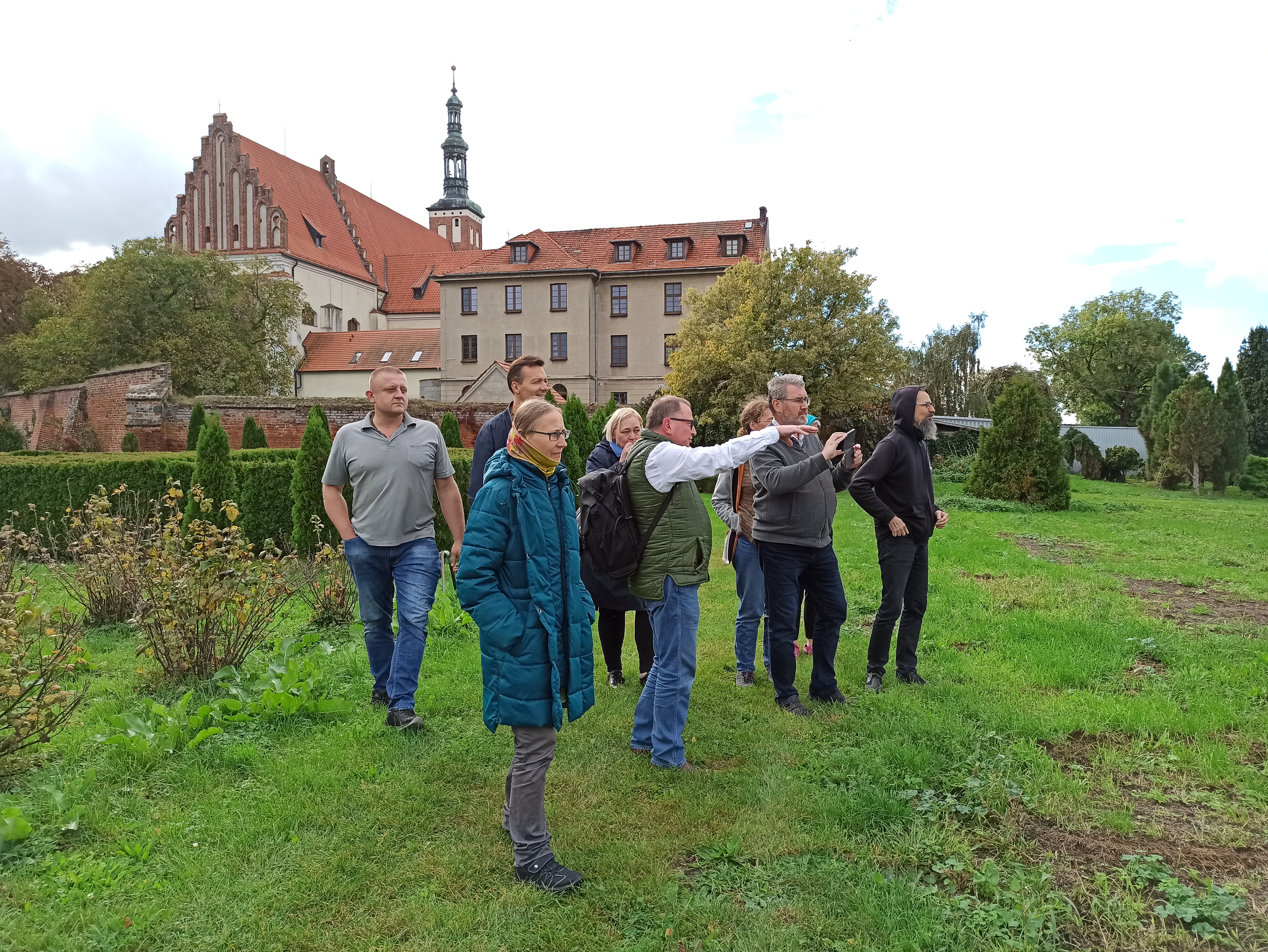
Meeting of Polish Laudato Si' Animators in Lubiń about a new programme: "Warm Home – Warm Church”

The Polish branch of the Laudato Si Movement (Światowy Ruch Katolików na rzecz Środowiska) was registered as a foundation in 2019. Apart from the regular Laudato Si Animators training, the foundation organizes conferences, other meetings, and has initiated various projects:

- Green Parishes,
- Conferences "Creatio Continua" (international), organized in cooperation with the Pontifical University of John Paul II in Kraków,
- PielGREEN – illustrated Green Pilgrimage Principles (available also in English as PilGREEN), which promote spiritual ecotourism on foot,
- Programme "Warm Home – Warm Church".
