= Laudato si' =

2015 encyclical of Pope Francis

Laudato si' Italian for 'Praise Be to You' Encyclical of Pope Francis
- Signature date: 24 May 2015
- Subject: On care for our common home
- Pages: 184
- Number: 2 of 4 of the pontificate
- Text: In Latin; In English
- AAS: 107 (9): 847-945

Laudato si' ('Praise Be to You') is the second encyclical of Pope Francis, subtitled "on care for our common home." In it, the Pope criticizes consumerism and irresponsible economic development, laments environmental degradation and global warming, and calls all people of the world to take "swift and unified global action."

The encyclical, dated 24 May 2015, was officially published at noon on 18 June 2015, accompanied by a news conference. The Vatican released the document in Italian, German, English, Spanish, French, Polish, Portuguese, and Arabic, alongside the original Latin. The original work has been set to music, and used in film.

The encyclical is the second published by Pope Francis, after Lumen fidei (The Light of Faith), which was released in 2013. Since Lumen fidei was largely the work of Francis's predecessor Benedict XVI, Laudato si' is generally viewed as the first encyclical that is entirely the work of Francis. Religious commentators often highlight similarities with subsequent works like the 2023 Laudate Deum.

The encyclical has been widely referenced by faith and environmental leaders both inside and outside the catholic church. In particular scientists and environmental activists praised the moral clarity of Francis for connecting religion with the practical scientific issues like the climate crises.

== Structure ==
The document is organised as follows:

- Introduction: (sections 1-16)
- Chapter 1: What is happening to our common home? (sections 17–61)
- Chapter 2: The Gospel of Creation (sections 62–100). While this chapter deals with "the convictions of believers," the Pope notes his awareness that some people reject, or merely tolerate, this perspective.
- Chapter 3: The human roots of the ecological crisis (sections 101–136)
- Chapter 4: Integral ecology (sections 137–162)
- Chapter 5: Lines of approach and action (sections 163–201)
- Chapter 6: Ecological education and spirituality (sections 202–246)
- The text is followed by two prayers (pages 178–180).

The six substantive chapters each have their "own subject and specific approach," but build cumulatively on the preceding chapters.

== Content ==
John Zizioulas, Eastern Orthodox metropolitan of Pergamon, presents the encyclical Laudato si' at the press conference in Rome.

The title of the social encyclical is a Central Italian phrase from Francis of Assisi's 13th-century "Canticle of the Sun" (also called the Canticle of the Creatures), a poem and prayer in which God is praised for the creation of the different creatures and aspects of the Earth.

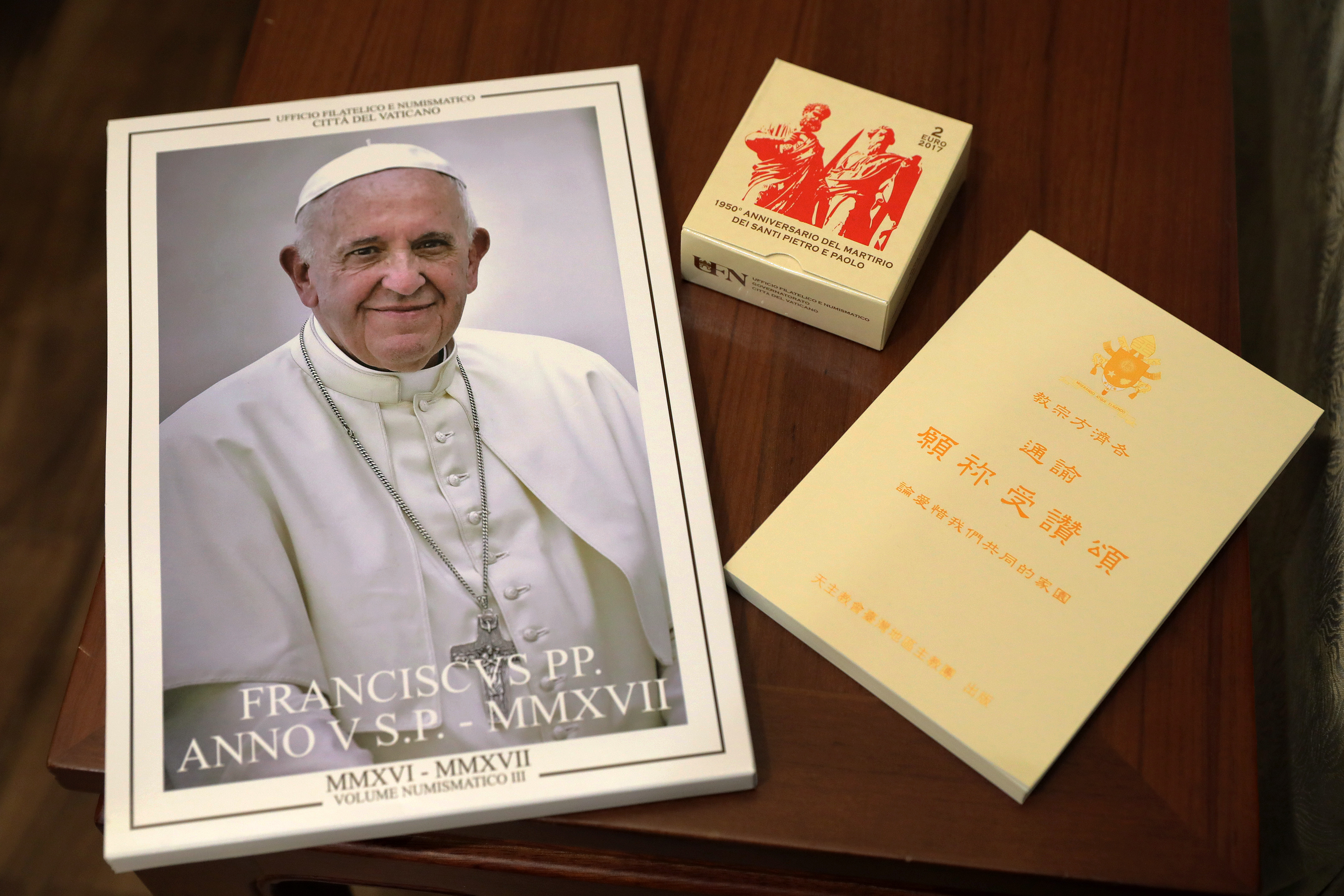
Laudato si' (Traditional Chinese version)

The tone of the Pope's phrasing has been described as "cautious and undogmatic, and he specifically calls for discussion and dialogue." For example, he states in the encyclical (#188):

There are certain environmental issues where it is not easy to achieve a broad consensus. Here I would state once more that the Church does not presume to settle scientific questions or to replace politics. But I am concerned to encourage an honest and open debate so that particular interests or ideologies will not prejudice the common good.

He adds that "Although the post-industrial period may well be remembered as one of the most irresponsible in history, nonetheless there is reason to hope that humanity at the dawn of the twenty-first century will be remembered for having generously shouldered its grave responsibilities." Francis does state that concern for the natural world is no longer "'optional' but is an integral part of the Church teaching on social justice."

Francis reportedly has said that the encyclical was not really an environmental document at all. The warming of the planet is a symptom of a greater problem: the developed world's indifference to the destruction of the planet as nations pursue short-term economic gains. This has resulted in a "throwaway culture" in which unwanted items and unwanted people, such as the unborn, the elderly, and the poor, are discarded as waste. This subtext makes the document "more profoundly subversive" than it appears on the surface.

The real problem, according to Francis, lies in the fact that humans no longer see God as the Creator. Thus we see "other living beings as mere objects subjected to arbitrary human domination" and do not realize that "the ultimate purpose of other creatures is not found in us." Francis says that instead of viewing humanity as having "dominion" over the earth, we must see that everything is interconnected and that all of creation is a "kind of universal family." Nature cannot be seen as something apart from humanity, or merely the place where we live. He says that our social and environmental crises are thus one complex crisis that must be solved holistically.

=== Environmentalism ===
The Catholic Church, even after the Second Vatican Council, had put some distance between itself and the modern environmentalist movement. This was due primarily to concerns about Malthusian-derived concepts about population control and how that related to Catholic moral teachings on aspects such as artificial contraception and abortion, as emphasised in Pope Paul VI's encyclical Humanae Vitae. Martin Palmer, an Anglican who was previously the Secretary General of the Alliance of Religions and Conservation (an NGO created by Prince Philip, Duke of Edinburgh, in 1995 to change the views of religions on environmentalism and global warming) claims that Francis' encyclical "really helped, but now unfortunately, people in the Vatican still fear they will be attacked or compromised over this."

Francis "pulls no punches" when lamenting pollution, climate change, a lack of clean water, loss of biodiversity, and an overall decline in human life and a breakdown of society. "Never have we so hurt and mistreated our common home as we have in the last two hundred years," he states.

He "describe[s] a relentless exploitation and destruction of the environment, for which he blamed apathy, the reckless pursuit of profits, excessive faith in technology and political shortsightedness." Laudato si' "unambiguously accepts the scientific consensus that changes in the climate are largely man-made" and states that "climate change is a global problem with grave implications: environmental, social, economic, political and for the distribution of goods. It represents one of the principal challenges facing humanity in our day" and warns of "unprecedented destruction of ecosystems, with serious consequence for all of us" if prompt climate change mitigation efforts are not undertaken.

The encyclical highlights the role of fossil fuels in causing climate change. "We know that technology based on the use of highly polluting fossil fuels – especially coal, but also oil and, to a lesser degree, gas – needs to be progressively replaced without delay," Francis says. "Until greater progress is made in developing widely accessible sources of renewable energy, it is legitimate to choose the less harmful alternative or to find short-term solutions." The encyclical's comments on climate change are consistent with the scientific consensus on climate change.

=== Poverty ===
Concern for the environment is partnered with concern for people: "We are faced not with two separate crises, one environmental and the other social, but rather with one complex crisis which is both social and environmental." The encyclical "points out that we continue to tolerate inequality, in which some consider themselves more worthy than others, going on to assert that developed nations are morally obligated to assist developing nations in combating the climate-change crisis. Poor nations, the pontiff says, are ill-prepared to adapt to the effects of climate change and will bear the brunt of its effects. He suggests that the priorities of the poorest countries in the world should be:

- to eliminate extreme poverty and to promote the social development of their people
- to acknowledge the scandalous level of consumption in some privileged sectors of their population and to combat corruption more effectively, and
- to develop less polluting forms of energy production, but [with] the help of countries which have experienced great growth at the cost of the ongoing pollution of the planet.

Linking the issues of poverty, which was a major issue in his papacy, and the environment, he insists that the world must "hear both the cry of the earth and the cry of the poor."

He does not believe, according to the editor of First Things, R. R. Reno, that "for all our flaws, Western societies are more democratic, more egalitarian, and more inclusive than any in history." Citing the New Zealand Bishops' Conference Statement on Environmental Issues, Francis asks "what the commandment 'Thou shall not kill' means when 'twenty percent of the world's population consumes resources at a rate that robs the poor nations and future generations of what they need to survive.'"

=== Science and modernism ===
"Science and religion, with their distinctive approaches to understanding reality, can enter into an intense dialogue fruitful for both," according to the pontiff. Religions, including Christianity, can make "rich contributions ... towards an integral ecology and the full development of humanity," however, "the scientific and experimental method" itself can be part of the problem when it decouples creation from the Creator.

Reno criticizes the encyclical, writing Laudato si' makes "many fierce denunciations of the current global order." This global order "destroys environment, oppresses the multitudes, and makes us blind to the beauty of creation." According to Reno, the critiques of the scientific and technocratic present contained in the encyclical make this "perhaps the most anti-modern encyclical since the Syllabus of Errors, Pius IX's haughty 1864 dismissal of the conceits of the modern era." He adds that the encyclical's tone lacks elements commonly found in the works of John Paul II and Benedict XVI that, in the tradition of Gaudium et spes, would have affirmed the modern world while correcting its errors.

=== Technology ===
Modern technology, the "dominant technocratic paradigm," is seen as a key contributor to the environmental crisis and human suffering. In the technocratic paradigm, Pope Francis points out, technology is viewed as the "principal key to the meaning of existence" and asks the world to "resist" the "assault" of the technocratic paradigm.

"The technocratic paradigm has become so dominant that it would be difficult to do without its resources and even more difficult to utilize them without being dominated by their internal logic. It has become countercultural to choose a lifestyle whose goals are even partly independent of technology... Technology tends to absorb everything into its ironclad logic, and those who are surrounded with technology 'know full well that it moves forward in the final analysis neither for profit nor for the well-being of the human race.'"

B. P. Green observes that Francis's "continual rejection of the 'technocratic paradigm' in the encyclical" should not confuse the reader into thinking that he rejects technological progress itself.

Technology is not value-neutral and technological developments are directed by the profit motive, according to Pope Francis. This is a form of institutionalized greed, generally with little regard for environmental and social consequences. "The economy accepts every advance in technology with a view to profit, without concern for its potentially negative impact on human beings." The encyclical warns against "blind confidence in technical solutions," particularly since "the specialization which belongs to technology makes it difficult to see the large picture," which "can actually become a form of ignorance." As a result, many technological solutions are nothing more than short-term techno-fixes attempting to remove symptoms rather than addressing the underlying environmental, social, economic, and even moral and spiritual problems: "Technology, which, linked to business interests, is presented as the only way of solving these problems, in fact, proves incapable of seeing the mysterious network of relations between things and so sometimes solves one problem only to create others."

Given these significant shortcomings of technology, "scientific and technological progress cannot be equated with the progress of humanity and history," and we are deluded by the myth of progress to believe that "ecological problems will solve themselves simply with the application of new technology and without need for ethical consideration or deep change." A profound redefinition of progress and "liberation from the dominant technocratic paradigm" are needed, i.e., "we have the freedom needed to limit and direct technology; we can put it at the service of another type of progress, one which is healthier, more human, more social, more integral." More fundamentally, according to the pontiff, we need to recognize that "technology severed from ethics will not easily be able to limit its own power," and that "the most extraordinary scientific advances, the most amazing technical abilities, the most astonishing economic growth, unless they are accompanied by authentic social and moral progress, will definitively turn against man." Pope Francis adds that the environmental crisis can ultimately only be solved if our immense technological developments are accompanied by a "development in human responsibility, values, and conscience."

=== Other topics ===
According to a New York Times summary, the encyclical is "sweeping" in scope and is wide-ranging (80 pages / 45,000 words), including mentions of such topics as urban planning, agricultural economics, biodiversity, and cultural protection. On agricultural economics, the Pope speaks favourably of the "great variety of small-scale food production systems which feed the greater part of the world's peoples," whose benefits include use of only modest amounts of land and the production of less waste. His examples include "small agricultural parcels, in orchards and gardens, hunting and wild harvesting [and] local fishing." Family and subsistence farming in these contexts should be able to survive and flourish alongside agribusiness.

An intensified pace of social evolution in modern times leads to a phenomenon which Francis calls "rapidification" (paragraph 18). The term translates the words rapidación (Spanish) and rapidizzazione (Italian), which appear together in the Italian text of the letter. Celia Hammond, of the University of Notre Dame Australia, considers the term, although new to her, "a perfect description of our 21st century world, particularly in developed countries like Australia."

The encyclical also gives voice to the Pope's opposition to abortion, embryonic stem cell research and population control, saying that respect for creation and human dignity go hand in hand. "Since everything is interrelated," Francis says, "concern for the protection of nature is also incompatible with the justification of abortion." According to the Pope, we cannot "genuinely teach the importance of concern for other vulnerable beings, however troublesome or inconvenient they may be, if we fail to protect a human embryo, even when its presence is uncomfortable and creates difficulties."

Laudato si' supports "valuing one's own body in its femininity or masculinity." In acknowledging differences, the Pope states "we can joyfully accept the specific gifts of another man or woman, the work of God the Creator, and find mutual enrichment."

=== Sources ===
The encyclical has 172 footnoted citations, many to Francis's immediate predecessors, John Paul II and Benedict XVI. The encyclical also "draws prominently from" Bartholomew I of Constantinople, the patriarch of the Eastern Orthodox Church of Constantinople and an ally of the pope. It is highly unusual to quote an Orthodox bishop in a papal document. More than 10 per cent of all the footnotes, 21, cite documents from 16 bishops' conferences around the world, mostly from the global south. This is the first encyclical to cite bishops' conferences. This was an effort, experts believe, to build alliances on a controversial topic. The encyclical also cites Thomas Aquinas, the 9th-century Sufi mystic Ali al-Khawas, Pierre Teilhard de Chardin, and Romano Guardini.

== History ==
=== Early stages ===
Speculation about an "environmental encyclical" to be issued by Pope Francis first began in November 2013. On 24 January 2014, the Vatican confirmed that drafting had begun. Federico Lombardi, the Holy See Press Office director, said that the document was in its very early stages, that no publication date had been set, and that the encyclical would be about ecology (and specifically the "ecology of man").

Cardinal Peter Turkson, the president of the Pontifical Council for Justice and Peace, and his team wrote the first draft of the encyclical. The draft was later reviewed by several theologians as well and sent (about three weeks before the encyclical's release) to the Congregation for the Doctrine of the Faith, the second section of the Secretariat of State, and the theologian of the Papal Household. Edits were made based on their responses.

In drafting the encyclical, the Vatican consulted with leading scientific experts for months. One of the experts consulted was Hans Joachim Schellnhuber, the founder and head of the Potsdam Institute for Climate Impact Research and chair of the German Advisory Council on Global Change. Archbishop Víctor Manuel Fernández was also among those who took part in the redaction of the document.

On 28 April 2015, in advance of the encyclical's release, the Vatican hosted a one-day conference on climate change, featuring Turkson, United Nations Secretary-General Ban Ki-moon (who delivered the keynote address), Ecuadorian president Rafael Correa and American economist Jeffrey Sachs.

The title and subtitle of the encyclical were first reported on in a Twitter message by Spanish-language journalist Mercedes De La Torre on 30 May 2015. The Vatican confirmed that the title would be Laudato si' on 10 June. While some initial reports said the encyclical would be called Laudato Sii, this was incorrect; the pope chose to use the original Umbrian form and spelling of the poem, with a single i.

On 4 June, the Vatican press office announced that the encyclical – which was "already attracting global attention for its expected discourses on Catholic theology on ecology, current environmental destruction, and climate change" – would be released on 18 June.

=== Leak ===
Four days before the encyclical's release, the Italian magazine L'Espresso posted a leaked draft of the document online. The leaked document "almost exactly matched" the final document. The leak angered Vatican officials, who called it a "heinous act" and revoked the press credentials of the longtime L'Espresso Vatican correspondent Sandro Magister. The New York Times and the Italian newspaper La Stampa both noted suggestions that the leak came from conservatives inside the Vatican who wished to embarrass the pope and hinder the rollout of the encyclical.

=== Release ===
The encyclical letter was officially released at an event in the New Synod Hall of the Vatican City. Speaking at the press conference were Turkson, Schellnhuber, and John Zizioulas (the metropolitan of Pergamon, representing the Orthodox Church). On the day of the encyclical's official release, Pope Francis issued two messages about it on his official Twitter account, @Pontifex. It has been suggested that the encyclical's release was timed to influence three summits being held at the United Nations on financial aid, sustainable development and climate change later in 2015.

== Reception ==
After the encyclical was released, the Vatican's website was briefly inaccessible as many people tried to read it. It has been described as "one of the shrewdest documents issued by the Vatican during the past century" and "has revealed Francis as a wily and sophisticated politician of the first order." It contains, according to Paul Vallely, "a raft of defenses against critics who dismiss it as the work of some kind of left-wing maverick."

Pope Leo XIV described the breadth of its impact in a speech celebrating its tenth anniversary:

This encyclical has greatly inspired the Catholic Church and many people of goodwill. It has proven to be a source of dialogue. It has given rise to reflection groups, academic programs in schools and universities, and partnerships and projects of various kinds on every continent. Many dioceses and religious institutes have been moved to take action to care for our common home, helping once more to give priority to the poor and marginalized in the process. Its impact has even extended to international summits, ecumenical and interreligious dialogue, economic and business circles, as well as theological and bioethical studies. The phrase "care for our common home" has also been included in academic, scientific and political addresses and speeches.

=== Within the Roman Catholic Church ===
The Laudato Si' Movement, a global network of over 900 Catholic organizations and over 10,000 trained grassroots leaders known as Laudato Si' Animators, has played a key role in supporting the Church to receive and implement the encyclical. In close partnership with the Vatican Dicastery for Integral Human Development, Laudato Si' Movement has convened various global initiatives to raise awareness and spark action, such as the annual Laudato Si' Week celebration, the Season of Creation ecumenical celebration, and the film The Letter.

The United States Conference of Catholic Bishops, led by its president Joseph Edward Kurtz, the archbishop of Louisville, described the encyclical as "our marching orders for advocacy" and planned briefings on the encyclical with both chambers of Congress and with the White House. Cardinal Sean O'Malley of Boston said that the "constant linkage throughout the encyclical of the dual need to respect and protect 'Our Common Home' and the need to respect and protect the dignity and lives of the poor may be regarded as the distinctive characteristic of this powerful message of Pope Francis."

Filipino Cardinal Luis Antonio Tagle, the Archbishop of Manila, wrote that "In Laudato si' Pope Francis reminds us to replace consumption with a sense of sacrifice, greed with generosity and wastefulness with a spirit of sharing. We must 'give, and not simply give up'. We are called to free ourselves from all that is heavy and negative and wasteful and to enter into dialogue with our global family."

The three bishops of Northern and Central California, Stephen Blaire, Armando Xavier Ochoa, and Jaime Soto, issued a joint statement that highlighted how climate change disproportionately affects the poor. It read in part: "The Catholic perspective is that human and natural ecology go hand in hand. We are called to solidarity with the poor as well as stewardship of the Earth. Our deep regard for the dignity of every person commands us to cultivate a climate of life where each of God's children thrive and join with creation in praising our Creator. This is the 'integral ecology' of which Pope Francis speaks."

Bishop Richard Pates of Des Moines, Iowa, which has the first major presidential primary contest in the United States, called on candidates to show courage and leadership on the issue, saying "With presidential candidates already visiting us regularly, I encourage Catholics across our state, and all people of goodwill, to talk to them and ask not if, but how, they plan to work toward solutions to climate change."

German Archbishop of Hamburg Stefan Heße praised the encyclical, calling it "valuable momentum for a worldwide ecological reorientation." He commented further, saying:

He makes it clear that urgent issues of the future for the whole world and for all human beings have to be solved. Without a radical change of mentality, it will not do. Thus he underlines that the problems that concern all can be solved only by all.

Vaticanologist John L. Allen Jr., said in an analysis, "Laudato si' seems destined to go down as a major turning point, the moment when environmentalism claimed pride of place on a par with the dignity of human life and economic justice as a cornerstone of Catholic social teaching. It also immediately makes the Catholic Church arguably the leading moral voice in the press to combat global warming and the consequences of climate change."

Catholic millennials have written widely giving their opinions of the encyclical.

==== Criticism ====
Samuel Gregg, director of research at the libertarian Acton Institute, has criticised "the sheer overreach that plagues" Laudato si'. RealClearReligion editor Nicholas Hahn has said that "Good Catholics can disagree on how to combat climate change and shouldn't worry about being sent to the confessional if they drive a SUV."

This criticism comes even though Francis took "care to locate his text firmly in the substantial body of teaching set out by previous popes," especially by John Paul II and Benedict XVI.

In July 2015, Cardinal George Pell criticised Laudato si' for associating the church with the need to address climate, stating:

It's got many, many interesting elements. There are parts of it which are beautiful. But the church has no particular expertise in science ... the church has got no mandate from the Lord to pronounce on scientific matters. We believe in the autonomy of science.

=== From other faiths ===
Three days before the encyclical was released, the 14th Dalai Lama issued a Twitter message stating: "Since climate change and the global economy now affect us all, we have to develop a sense of the oneness of humanity."

Two days before the encyclical was released, Archbishop of Canterbury Justin Welby, head of the Anglican Communion, issued a "green declaration" (also signed by the Methodist Conference as well as representatives of the Catholic Church in England and Wales and the British Muslim, Sikh and Jewish communities) urging a transition to a low-carbon economy and fasting and prayer for success at the December 2015 United Nations Climate Change Conference in Paris.

The same day, the Lausanne Movement of global evangelical Christians said it was anticipating the encyclical and was grateful for it. The encyclical was also welcomed by the World Council of Churches and the Christian Reformed Church in North America.

Pope Francis's environmental encyclical Laudato si' has been welcomed by many environmental organisations of different faiths. Video of interfaith march in Rome to call for climate action.

=== From world leaders ===
The Secretary-General of the United Nations, Ban Ki-moon, welcomed the encyclical in a statement on the day it was released. Kofi Annan, the former UN secretary-general and current chair of the Africa Progress Panel, also issued a statement in support of the encyclical, stating "As Pope Francis reaffirms, climate change is an all-encompassing threat. ... I applaud the Pope for his strong moral and ethical leadership. We need more of such inspired leadership. Will we see it at the climate summit in Paris?"

Christiana Figueres, the executive secretary of the United Nations Framework Convention on Climate Change, said: "Pope Francis is personally committed to this issue like no other pope before him. I do think the encyclical is going to have a major impact. It will speak to the moral imperative of addressing climate change in a timely fashion in order to protect the most vulnerable."

On the same day, Jim Yong Kim, the president of the World Bank Group, also praised the encyclical.

=== From the scientific community ===
Science historian Naomi Oreskes observes that Laudato si' "insists we embrace the moral dimensions of problems that have heretofore been viewed primarily as scientific, technological, and economic."

The encyclical gave a boost to the fossil fuel divestment movement. Hans Joachim Schellnhuber, the founding director of the Potsdam Institute for Climate Impact Research (PIK) and chair of the German Advisory Council on Global Change, who advised the Vatican on the drafting of the encyclical, said that "the science of Laudato si' is watertight" and gave the pontiff an "A" for command of the subject.

An editorial in Nature praised the encyclical for its statements about sustainability and global poverty and the transition from fossil fuels to renewable energy sources: "The papal calls to end poverty and share the world's ecological space in a fair way are objectives that mirror the United Nations' Sustainable Development Goals, to be released in September. The Pope's letter adds an important facet to the discussion: it is not merely conceivable to secure a sound future for human civilization without relying on coal, oil and gas – it is a prerequisite." However, it criticised Francis for ignoring important issues like family planning and birth control. "Alas, he remained silent on issues of contraception. With a world population heading towards a possible 10 billion, the importance of family planning is clear. The Vatican has been brave on climate change. If it is serious about the fate of the planet and the welfare of its inhabitants, then it must be braver still on the issue of contraception."

A review by nine climate scientists under the Climate Feedback project concluded the encyclical "rather accurately depicts the current reality of climate change" and "fairly represents the present concerns raised by the scientific community."

Nicholas Stern, chair of the Grantham Research Institute on Climate Change and the Environment and author of an influential report on climate change, stated that "The publication of the Pope's encyclical is of enormous significance. He has shown great wisdom and leadership. Pope Francis is surely absolutely right that climate change raises vital moral and ethical issues. ... Moral leadership on climate change from the Pope is particularly important because of the failure of many heads of state and government around the world to show political leadership."

Leading ecological economist and steady-state theorist Herman Daly praised the Pope's encyclical on the grounds that it "unifies the main divisions of Christianity on at least the fundamental recognition that we have a shamefully neglected duty to care for the Earth out of which we evolved, and to share the Earth's life support more equitably with each other, with the future, and with other creatures." Daly even believes that the Pope "skates fairly close to the idea of steady-state economics," although the important issues of population stabilization, responsible family planning and contraception were "conspicuously near-absent" in the encyclical.

=== Impact on the United States political system ===
Stephen F. Schneck, the director of Institute for Policy Research & Catholic Studies at The Catholic University of America, has said that "Something's going to come out of this and it's definitely going to have an impact on public policy in the US." However, Kathy Saile, the former long time director of the US bishops' office for domestic social justice, does not believe that "it will spark a climate change bill, but someday when negotiations are happening on a bill or a treaty, these kinds of moral teachings could have an influence." Nonetheless, she added, "Pope Francis's tone, his honesty, how he talks about mercy and care for the poor, and his genuine desire to be a bridge," could influence political culture in Washington. "If he could change the tone of the debate, that would be an amazing gift."

Miami Archbishop Thomas Wenski, chairman of the US bishops' committee on domestic peace and justice, wrote a letter to Congress letting them know that "[the] U.S. bishops stand united with the Holy Father [Pope] in his call to protect creation." He also asked them to "resist any effort to impair the development of a national carbon standard and instead to support our nation's ability to address this urgent global challenge confronting the human family." Schneck opined that "This is different than the normal letters that the USCCB sends over all the time on a variety of issues. It really transcends the fault lines of both US politics and politics around the world."

Cornell anthropologists Annelise Riles and Vincent Ialenti told NPR.org: "We find Laudato si' important because it defies the United States' political imagination at every turn. In some moments, the pope reads like an archconservative, in other moments an archliberal. Sometimes he defers to scientists, other times he quotes scripture and, still other times, he criticizes the very foundations of economics. Mixing together ideas many see as incompatible, he forces us to think."

The New York Times reported that the encyclical put pressure on Catholics seeking the Republican Party nomination for president of the United States in 2016, including Jeb Bush, Marco Rubio, and Rick Santorum, who "have questioned or denied the established science of human-caused climate change, and have harshly criticized policies designed to tax or regulate the burning of fossil fuels." Jeb Bush said: "I hope I'm not going to get castigated for saying this by my priest back home, but I don't get economic policy from my bishops or my cardinal or my pope."

==== Neoconservative critique and counterarguments ====
Neoconservative circles in the United States have criticised the encyclical right from its publication in Rome, sometimes in very harsh terms. Writing in the Weekly Standard, Irwin M. Stelzer has argued that:

Pope Francis is unambiguously opposed to the American system of "savage capitalism." He has famously quoted a fourth century Doctor of the Church, St. Basil of Caesarea, who called money "the devil's dung," has railed against the "anonymous influences of mammon" and a "new colonialism" that includes "free trade treaties... [and] imposition of austerity," and stated a preference for "cooperatives." Throw in Francis' views that we are witnessing "a disturbing warming of the climatic system... due to the great concentration of greenhouse gasses," and that "there is an urgent need of a true world political authority," and you have positions that it will take more than a spoonful of the Pontiff's charm to make go down the throats of many Americans.

=== From industry ===
A lobbyist of Arch Coal sent an email to Republican lawmakers stating the pope "does not appear to address the tragedy of global energy poverty." The lobbyist argued the church should promote fossil fuels instead if he really cared about the poor. The email suggested "talking points" to the legislators for defending the coal industry and rejecting the arguments of the pope. The lobbyist wrote: "Billions of people around the globe are living without electrification and suffering through untold poverty and disease as a result." In contrast to these arguments the encyclical argues that fossil fuels in general and coal in particular threaten the poor: Fossil fuels are a threat to prosperity for the poor. They would suffer even more in particular from sea level rise, droughts, warming and extreme weather caused by burning fossil fuels.

In June 2019, in a meeting at the Vatican which climatologist Hans Joachim Schellnhuber described as one of the most significant of his 30-year career, Francis "convinced big oil CEOs to alter their message on climate change." These included CEOs of ExxonMobil, BP, Royal Dutch Shell, and Chevron who pledged to avert what Francis called "a climate emergency" that risks "perpetrating a brutal act of injustice towards the poor and future generations." Francis "stressed the need for a radical energy transition to save our common home." They pledged to "advance the energy transition [...] while minimizing the costs to vulnerable communities."

=== From other groups ===
Bill McKibben reviewed the encyclical in The New York Review of Books, and later called it "the most important document yet of this millennium."

The LGBT-interest magazine The Advocate noted that the encyclical contains passages which reinforce the church's position against the transsexuality movement, calling for "the acceptance of our bodies as God's gift."

Pankaj Mishra wrote that the encyclical was "arguably the most important piece of intellectual criticism in our time."

In 2019, the journal Biological Conservation published research by Malcolm McCallum showing evidence of widespread, sustained growth in interest in the environment in many countries around the world.

== Laudato Si' Movement ==
With the encyclical's publication in 2015, the Laudato Si' Movement was founded to bring together Catholics interested in promoting its message. In 2022 the Laudato Si' Movement consisted of 967 member organizations, 11539 Laudato Si' Animators, 204 Laudato Si' Circles and 58 National Chapters around the globe.

On 4 October 2021, the Vatican Dicastery for Integral Development launched the Laudato Si Action Platform, in collaboration with the Laudato Si' Movement and many other Catholic institutions.

== In film ==
The 2022 documentary film The Letter: A Message for our Earth, presented by YouTube Originals, tells the story of the Laudato Si' encyclical. The film was produced by Oscar-winning Off The Fence Productions and directed by Nicolas Brown, in partnership with the Laudato Si' Movement.

Following its global premiere in Vatican City on 4 October 2022, the film amassed over 7 million views in its first two weeks, with the support of celebrities such as Leonardo DiCaprio and Arnold Schwarzenegger.

== In music ==
On behalf of the Diocese of Limburg, Peter Reulein wrote the music for the oratorio Laudato si' – a Franciscan Magnificat to the libretto by Helmut Schlegel. This work is based on the Latin version of the Magnificat, corresponds to the Extraordinary Jubilee of Mercy, and includes texts from the apostolic exhortation Evangelii gaudium and from Laudato si'. The premiere of the oratorio took place in the Limburg Cathedral on 6 November 2016.

Another major musical work inspired by Laudato si is the Missa Laudato Si’ by Korean-American composer Dongryul Lee. Commissioned by the EcoVoice Project, the hour-long choral-orchestral work was premiered on 15 March 2025 at Loyola University Chicago by a combined ensemble including the New Earth Ensemble, with Kirsten Hedegaard conducting. It is structured in four movements: "Kyrie Eleison–The IUCN Red List of Threatened Species," "Gloria–Canticle of the Creatures," "Agnus Dei–Refugee," and "Ite, Missa Est–One Person's Truth." The piece integrates Latin liturgical text with contemporary poetry, including a poem by Syrian refugee child Abdullah Kasem Al Yatim (UNHCR) and an original poem by Korean poet Ryu Shiva (translated by the composer). The composition employs microtonality, spectral techniques, and multilingual text settings to explore themes of environmental justice, spirituality, and activism in response to Pope Francis’s encyclical.

== Laudato Si' and Pope Francis' other writings ==
The apostolic exhortation Laudate Deum, considered a text in continuity with Laudato Si', was published on 4 October 2023. Francis states that:

Eight years have passed since I published the Encyclical Letter Laudato Si', when I wanted to share with all of you, my brothers and sisters of our suffering planet, my heartfelt concerns about the care of our common home. Yet, with the passage of time, I have realized that our responses have not been adequate, while the world in which we live is collapsing and may be nearing the breaking point.

The Pope develops his thinking on the "technocratic paradigm," and aims to clarify and bring to completion his ideas on integral ecology, while at the same time sounding an alarm, and a call for co-responsibility, in the face of the climate emergency. Journalists Jason Horowitz and Elisabetta Povoledo stated that "eight years after his landmark letter on humanity's obligation to protect the environment, Francis warns that there is still a lot to be done, and quickly."

In particular, the Exhortation mentions the 2023 United Nations Climate Change Conference, being held in Dubai at the end of November and beginning of December in 2023. He urged governments to make the conference a turning point in the urgent fight against the climate crisis.

Although Laudato si' "had a transversal and very profound impact within and outside the Catholic Church," according to Paolo Conversi, the coordinator of the Laudato Si' Observatory, an interdisciplinary group at the Pontifical Gregorian University in Rome, Laudate Deum serves as proof that Francis feels his message has not been enough heard. "What is being asked of us is nothing other than a certain responsibility for the legacy we will leave behind," Francis states, "once we pass from this world."

In his 2024 encyclical letter Dilexit nos, Francis observes that

The teaching of the social encyclicals Laudato si' and Fratelli tutti is not unrelated to our encounter with the love of Jesus Christ. For it is by drinking of that same love that we become capable of forging bonds of fraternity, of recognizing the dignity of each human being, and of working together to care for our common home.

== See also ==
- The Letter: A Message for our Earth (2022)
- Climate change and poverty
- Ecotheology
- Synod of Bishops for the Pan-Amazon region
- Stewardship (theology)
- Laudate Deum (2023)
