= Andre Kostelanetz =

Russian-American conductor (1901–1980)

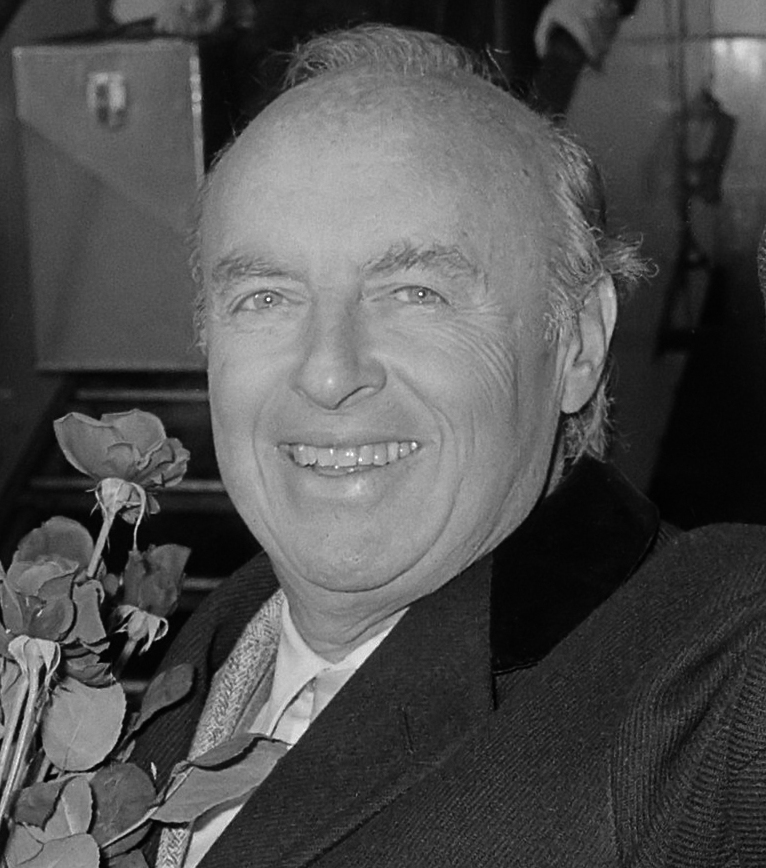
- Kostelanetz in 1963

Background information
- Born: December 22, 1901; Saint Petersburg, Russia
- Died: January 13, 1980 (aged 78) Port-au-Prince, Haiti
- Occupations: Conductor; arranger
- Years active: 1920–1979
- Spouse: Lily Pons (m. 1938–1958) Sara Gene Orcutt (m. 1960)

Andre Kostelanetz (Russian: Абрам Наумович Костелянец; December 22, 1901 – January 13, 1980) was a Russian-American popular orchestral music conductor and arranger who was one of the major exponents of popular orchestra music.

== Biography ==
Abram Naumovich Kostelyanetz was born in Saint Petersburg, Russia to a prominent Jewish family. He was a cousin of physicist Lew Kowarski.

His father, Nachman Yokhelevich (Naum Ignatyevich) Kostelyanetz, was active on the St. Petersburg stock exchange; his maternal grandfather, Aizik Yevelevich Dymshitz, was a wealthy merchant and industrialist, engaged in timber production. Kostelanetz began playing the piano at four and a half years old. He studied composition and orchestration at the Petrograd Conservatory of Music. When he was 19, the Grand Petrograd Opera Company held a competition to select a chorusmaster and assistant conductor, in which he was selected despite being the youngest applicant. Kostelanetz continued there until leaving Russia in March 1922 after the Russian Revolution, when he stayed in Paris for a time before moving on to the United States.

He arrived in the United States that year, and in the 1920s, conducted concerts for radio. In the 1930s, he began his own weekly show on CBS, Andre Kostelanetz Presents. Kostelanetz was known for arranging and recording light classical music pieces for mass audiences, as well as orchestral versions of songs and Broadway show tunes. He made numerous recordings over the course of his career, which had sales of over 50 million. For many years, he conducted the New York Philharmonic in pops concerts and recordings, in which they were billed as Andre Kostelanetz and His Orchestra.

Kostelanetz may be best known to modern audiences for a series of easy listening instrumental albums on Columbia Records from the 1940s until 1980. Kostelanetz actually started making this music before there was a genre called "easy listening". He continued until after some of his contemporaries, including Mantovani, had stopped recording. Outside the United States, one of his best known works was an orchestral arrangement of the tune "With a Song in my Heart", which was the signature tune of a long-running BBC radio program, at first called Forces Favourites, then Family Favourites, and finally Two Way Family Favourites.

He commissioned many works, including Aaron Copland's Lincoln Portrait, Jerome Kern's Portrait of Mark Twain, William Schuman's New England Triptych, Paul Creston's Frontiers, Ferde Grofé's Hudson River Suite, Virgil Thomson's musical portraits of Fiorello La Guardia and Dorothy Thompson, Alan Hovhaness's Floating World, and Ezra Laderman's Magic Prison. William Walton dedicated his Capriccio burlesco to Kostelanetz, who conducted the first performance and made the first recording, both with the New York Philharmonic.

His last concert was A Night in Old Vienna with the San Francisco Symphony Orchestra at that city's War Memorial Opera House on December 31, 1979.

== Personal life ==
His first wife was soprano Lily Pons from 1938 to 1958, when they divorced. They owned a home in Palm Springs, California which was built in 1955. In 1960 he married Sara Gene Orcutt; the marriage lasted several years. Both unions were childless.

His brother, Boris Kostelanetz (1911–2006), was a prominent tax defense lawyer.

== Death ==
After the December 31, 1979 concert with the San Francisco Symphony Orchestra, Kostelanetz left for a vacation in Haiti. While in Haiti, Kostelanetz contracted pneumonia and died on January 13, 1980, aged 78.

== Discography (partial) ==
Many of the early LP releases were actually re-releases of albums released earlier on 78 rpm records. Musical Comedy Favorites, for example, was released as Volume 1 (album M-430) in late 1940 for songs 1 through 8, and Volume 2 (M-502) in 1941 for the remaining 8 songs on the second side of the LP.

Four of Kostelanetz's albums made the Billboard Hot 200, no match for his Columbia easy listening rivals Ray Conniff and Percy Faith but typical of many of popular instrumental easy listening artists of the day whose audience did not buy their albums immediately upon release but bought them over the years.

- Andre Kostelanetz & His Orchestra: "Carmen" LP #693cl735 Columbia 1950 U.S.A.
- Music of Sigmund Romberg,1946, Columbia Masterworks MM635
- The Music of Victor Herbert, Columbia Masterworks M-415
- Tchaikovsky: Nutcracker Suite, Op. 71a, 1956, Columbia Long Playing CL 730
- Music of Irving Berlin, 1950, Columbia Masterworks MM/ML-4314
- The Music of Stephen Foster, 1941, 3 LP Set, Columbia Masterworks M-442 78's
- Mississippi Suite, 1947, Columbia Masterworks MX-284 12" album
- The Music of Chopin, 1949, Columbia Masterworks MM-840
- Waltzes of Johann Strauss, 1948, Columbia Masterworks ML-2011 10" album
- Music of Cole Porter, 1948, Columbia Masterworks ML-2014
- Music of George Gershwin, 1948, Columbia Masterworks 2026
- Mississippi Suite, 1948, Columbia Masterworks ML-2046 10" album
- Invitation to the Waltz, 1948, Columbia Masterworks ML-2069 10" album
- Swan Lake, Columbia Masterworks ML-4308 1950
- An American in Paris, Columbia Masterworks ML-4455 1951
- Black Magic, 1955, Columbia CL 712
- Grofé: Grand Canyon Suite, 1955, Columbia CL 716
- Prokofiev, Peter and the Wolf & Saint-Saens, Carnival of the Animals, 1955, Columbia CL 720
- Music of Vincent Youmans, 1955, Columbia CL 734
- Verdi: Aida, 1955, Columbia CL 755
- Bravo!, 1955, Columbia CL 758
- Vienna Nights, 1955, Columbia CL 769
- Music of Fritz Kreisler, Music of Sigmund Romberg, 1955, Columbia CL 771
- You and the Night and the Music, 1955, Columbia CL 772
- Musical Comedy Favorites, 1955, Columbia CL 775
- Music of Jerome Kern, 1955, Columbia CL 776
- The Lure of the Tropics, 1955, Columbia CL 780
- Stardust, 1955, Columbia CL 781
- Kostelanetz Conducts..., 1955, Columbia CL 786
- An American In Paris/Rhapsody In Blue, 1955, Columbia CL 795
- La Boheme for Orchestra, 1955, Columbia CL 797
- Clair de Lune and Popular Favorites, 1955, Columbia CL 798
- La Traviata, 1955 Columbia CL 799
- The Sleeping Beauty, 1956, Columbia CL 804
- Strauss Waltzes, 1956, Columbia CL 805
- Calendar Girl, 1956, Columbia CL 811
- Bolero!, 1956, Columbia CL 833
- The Very Thought of You, 1956, Columbia CL 843
- Music of Chopin, 1956, Columbia CL 862
- Cafe Continental, 1956, Columbia CL 863
- Beautiful Dreamer: Music of Stephen Foster, 1956, Columbia CL 864
- Broadway Spectacular, 1956, Columbia CL 865
- Madame Butterfly, 1956, Columbia CL 869
- Tender Is the Night, 1956, Columbia CL 886
- The Lure of Spain, 1957, Columbia CL 943
- Rigoletto, 1957, Columbia CL 970
- The Romantic Music of Rachmaninoff, 1957, Columbia CL 1001
- The Lure of France, 1958, Columbia CL 1054/CS 8111
- The Columbia Album of Richard Rodgers, Vol. 1, 1958, Columbia CL 1068
- The Columbia Album of Richard Rodgers, Vol. 2, 1958, Columbia CL 1069
- Blues Opera, 1958, Columbia CL 1099
- Encore!, 1958, Columbia CL 1135/CS 8008
- Theatre Party, 1958, Columbia CL 1199/CS 8026
- The Romantic Music of Tchaikovsky, Vol. 1, 1958, Columbia CL 1208
- The Romantic Music of Tchaikovsky, Vol. 2, 1958, Columbia CL 1209
- Romantic Arias for Orchestra, 1959, Columbia CL 1263
- Flower Drum Song, 1959, Columbia CL 1280/CS 8095
- Great Waltzes, 1959, Columbia CL 1321
- The Lure of Paradise, 1959, Columbia CL 1335/CS 8144
- Strauss Waltzes, 1959, Columbia CL 1354/CS 8162
- Gypsy Passion, 1960, Columbia CL 1431/CS 8228
- Joy to the World, 1960, Columbia CL 1528/CS 8328
- The Unsinkable Molly Brown, 1960, Columbia CL 1576/CS 8376
- Kostelanetz Favorites Columbia ML 4065
- The Nutcracker Suite, 1961, Columbia Masterworks 6264
- The New Wonderland of Sound, 1961, Columbia CL 1657/CS 8457
- Star Spangled Marches, 1962, Columbia CL 1718/CS 8518
- Broadway's Greatest Hits, 1962, Columbia CL 1827/CS 8627
- Fire and Jealousy, Columbia CL 1898/CS 8698
- Music from "Mr. President", 1962, Columbia CL 1921/CS 8721
- World Favorite Romantic Concertos for Piano & Orchestra, 1963, Columbia Masterworks ML 5876/MS 6476
- Wonderland of Sound, 1963, Columbia-CL-1938
- Wonderland of Golden Hits, 1963, Columbia CL 2039/CS 8839
- Wonderland of Christmas, 1963, Columbia CL 2068/CS 8868
- Kostelanetz in Wonderland: Golden Encores, 1963, Columbia CL 2078/CS 8878
- New York Wonderland, 1964, Columbia CL 2138/CS 8938 - #68 Billboard Albums
- I Wish You Love, 1964, Columbia CL 2185/CS 8985
- New Orleans Wonderland, 1964, Columbia CL 2250/CS 9050
- The Romantic Strings of Andre Kostelanetz, 1965, Columbia Masterworks ML 6119/MS 6711
- Wishing You a Merry Christmas, 1965, Columbia Masterworks ML 6179/MS 6779
- Romantic Waltzes by Tchaikovsky, 1965, Columbia Masterworks MS 6824
- Warsaw Concerto, 1966, Columbia Masterworks ML 6226/MS 6826 (reissue of 1963 ML 5876/MS 6476)
- Today's Golden Hits, 1966, Columbia CS 9334
- The Shadow of Your Smile, 1966, Columbia CS 13285
- Grand Canyon suite 1966 Harmony HS 11195
- Season's Greetings from Barbra Streisand and Friends,1967, Columbia Special Products, CSS 1075
- Exotic Nights, 1967, Columbia CS 9381
- The Kostelanetz Sound of Today, 1967, Columbia CS 9409
- Today's Greatest Movie Hits, 1967, Columbia CS 9556
- Scarborough Fair, 1968, Columbia CS 9623
- For the Young at Heart, 1968, Columbia CS 9691
- Sounds of Love, 1968, Columbia - #194 Billboard Albums
- Traces, 1969, Columbia CS 9823 - #200 Billboard Albums
- Magic of Music 1968 Harmony HS 11281
- Andre Kostelanetz Conducts Puccini's "La Boheme" for Orchestra, 1969, Columbia Masterworks MS 7219
- Greatest Hits of the '60s, 1970, Columbia CS 9973
- I'll Never Fall in Love Again, 1970, Columbia CS 9998
- Everything Is Beautiful, 1970, Columbia 30037
- Sunset, 1970, Columbia Masterworks 30075
- Be My love, 1970 Harmony H30014
- And God Created Great Whales (Hovhaness), 1971, Columbia 30390
- Love Story, 1971, Columbia 30501 - #183 Billboard Albums
- For All We Know, 1971, Columbia 30672
- Plays Chicago, 1971, Columbia 31002
- Plays Cole Porter, 1972, Columbia 31491
- Love Theme from "The Godfather", 1972, Harmony 31500
- Plays the greatest hits of Broadway & Hollywood, 1972 Harmony 31414
- Plays the Worlds Greatest Love Songs, 1973, Columbia 32002
- Last Tango in Paris, 1973, Columbia 32187
- Moon River, 1973, Columbia 32243
- Plays Great Hits of Today, 1973, Columbia 32415
- The Way We Were, 1974, Columbia 32578
- Plays Michel Legrand's Greatest Hits, 1974, Columbia 32580
- Plays Music of Villa-Lobos, 1974, Columbia 32821
- Plays Gershwin, 1974, Columbia 32825
- Musical Reflections of Broadway and Hollywood, 1974, Columbia 33061
- Plays "Murder on the Orient Express" and Other Great Themes, 1975, Columbia 33437
- Never Can Say Goodbye, 1975, Columbia 33550
- I'm Easy, 1976, Columbia 34157
- Dance With Me, 1976, Columbia 34352
- Plays the Music of Charlie Chaplin and Duke Ellington, 1977, Columbia 34660
- Plays Broadway's Greatest Hits, 1977, Columbia 34864
- You Light Up My Life, 1978, Columbia 35328
- Theme from "Superman", 1979, Columbia 35781
- Various Themes, 1980, Columbia 36382
- The Complete Christmas Album, 2018 - #20 Billboard Classical Albums

== Bibliography ==
- James H. North (2011). Andre Kostelanetz on Records and on the Air: A Discography and Radio Log. Lanham, Toronto, Plymouth, UK: The Scarecrow Press, Inc. ISBN 978-0-8108-7732-0.
- Andre Kostelanetz in collaboration with Gloria Hammond (1981). Echoes: Memoirs of Andre Kostelanetz. New York: Harcourt Brace Jovanovich. ISBN 0-15-127392-8.
- So You Want to Be... Cbs Radio And Young America News Weekly. April 12, 1939.
