= Robert Lax =

American poet

- Born: November 30, 1915; Olean, New York, U.S.
- Died: September 26, 2000 (aged 84); Olean, New York, U.S.
- Education: Columbia University (BA)
- Occupations: writer; editor; professor

Robert Lax (November 30, 1915 – September 26, 2000) was an American poet, known in particular for his association with Trappist monk and writer Thomas Merton. Another friend of his youth was the painter Ad Reinhardt.

After a long period of drifting from job to job about the world, Lax settled on the island of Patmos during the latter part of his life. Considered by some to be a self-exiled hermit, he nonetheless welcomed visitors to his home, but did nothing to court publicity or expand his literary career or reputation.

== Life ==
Lax was born in Olean, New York, to Sigmund and Rebecca Lax. His father had immigrated to the United States from Austria at the age of sixteen. When Robert was in eighth grade, the family moved to Elmhurst, Queens, New York. He first met the future painter Ad Reinhardt at Elmhurst's Newtown High School.

Lax attended Columbia University, where he studied with the poet and critic Mark Van Doren. As a student there in the late 1930s, he worked on the college humor magazine Jester with a classmate who became a close lifetime friend, Thomas Merton. Others on the Jester staff were Ed Rice, founder and editor of Jubilee magazine (to which all three men contributed in the 1950s and '60s) and Ad Reinhardt. At Columbia, Lax also contributed to the Boar's Head Society anthology, and was a member of the Philolexian Society.

In his biography, The Seven Storey Mountain, Merton describes Lax at a meeting with other Jester staff: "Taller than them all, and more serious, with a long face, like a horse, and a great mane of black hair on top of it, Bob Lax meditated on some incomprehensible woe." Mark Van Doren has commented that "The woe, I now believe, was that Lax could not state his bliss; his love of the world and all things, all persons in it".

After graduating in 1938, Lax joined the staff of The New Yorker, working his way up from assistant poetry editor; he was also poetry editor of Time magazine, wrote screenplays in Hollywood, and taught at both the University of North Carolina and Connecticut College for Women. Around 1941, he and Merton volunteered for a couple of weeks at Catherine Doherty's Friendship House in Harlem. Lax converted from Judaism to Catholicism in 1943, five years after Thomas Merton, and Rice was godfather to both men. But Lax desired a simple life, so he wandered, working in circuses in Canada as a clown and expert juggler. It was travelling with the Cristiani Brothers circus in 1949 that enabled him to generate material for his collection The Circus of the Sun, although that was not published until 1959.

Meanwhile, Lax had helped Rice start Jubilee, a lay Catholic magazine, in 1952 and became its roving editor. In 1953, he was in Paris, writing for a small literary magazine, New Story. By 1962, he found his way to the Greek islands, initially settling in Kalymnos, then moving on to Patmos, where he spent his last years. Seeking relative solitude, Lax said it was important to "put yourself in a place where Grace can flow." The 1962-67, correspondence of Lax and Merton, written in a kind of comic argot, covered his early years in Greece and was first published as A Catch of Anti-Letters in 1978. Later, their correspondence over the years 1938–68 was published as When Prophecy Still Had a Voice.

In 1969, Lax received the National Council of the Arts Award. In 1990 he received an honorary doctorate from St. Bonaventure University, a Franciscan institution near Olean, and became its first Reginald A. Lenna Visiting Professor of English, spending three weeks giving readings on campus. The university now houses the main Robert Lax archives. Additional collections of his papers are at Columbia and Georgetown University.

During his final years on Patmos, Lax was the subject of Nicolas Humbert's and Werner Penzel's 1999 film, Why Should I Buy a Bed When All That I Want Is Sleep? He moved back to Olean in 2000, leaving Europe by ship from Southampton, accompanied by his niece and her husband, as he would not travel by air. Shortly after, on September 26, 2000, he died at age 84.

== Writing ==
Lax wrote hundreds of poems and dozens of books in his long career, but never reached the level of recognition that some of his peers say he deserves. Jack Kerouac, whom he knew in New York, called Lax "one of the great original voices of our times ...a Pilgrim in search of beautiful innocence". Circus of the Sun, a collection of poems metaphorically comparing the circus to Creation, was one of his most acclaimed works. On its publication in 1959, The New York Times hailed it as "perhaps the greatest English-language poem of this century." An excerpt was later distributed to those attending Lax's funeral at St. Bonaventure University on 29 September 29, 2000.

And in the beginning was love. Love made a sphere:
all things grew within it; the sphere then encompassed
beginnings and endings, beginning and end. Love
had a compass whose whirling dance traced out a
sphere of love in the void: in the center thereof
rose a fountain.

Over the years following the composition of Circus of the Sun, Lax's poetry became more and more stripped down to essentials, concentrating on simplicity and making the most out of the fewest components, a technique common to artistic minimalism. Sometimes these pieces consisted of single words, even single syllables, running page after page. As a consequence his work was perceived as sharing the characteristics of Concrete poetry and was included in Stephen Bann's defining Poetry: An International Anthology (1967) and mentioned in Mary Ellen Solt's study, Concrete Poetry: A World View (1968). Lax certainly shared an interest in artistic procedures with his friend Ad Reinhardt and reflected that artist's series of black paintings in his own "Homage to Reinhardt":

black/black/black//
blue/blue/blue//
black/black/black/black//
blue/blue/blue

Specialist presses supported such gestures and brought out limited editions, such as the series of hand-written color poems that appeared as silkscreens from Edizioni Francesco Conz. Even words were dispensed with in some of the 1971 publications from Journeyman Press. Mostly Blue consists of graph paper filled in with colored squares, while Another Red Red Blue Poem is composed of thin bars of those colors. In an interview with Nicholas Zurbrugg, Lax later commented on his adoption of minimalist abstraction that "conversations with Reinhardt, and his directions in painting, certainly had an influence on my writing. Sometimes not specifically, but the general direction that he was working in certainly did—towards reducing the number of colours, reducing the form, and repeating the theme."

On another occasion he explained the creation of thin vertical columns of a few numbers or a single capital letter as arising from the wish to adopt the methods of abstract painters, "trying to find what the essence for me of a traditional poem is, and getting it down to that. . . . I wanted to see what it would be. I wanted to do it with the simplest elements." In other instances, Lax used repetition of a few words either as a device for instilling a sense of serenity or to create a sense of surprise in the reader when a change in the pattern occurs. Despite the limited vocabulary of his poems, some create narratives, while others seem more like examples for use in meditative practice or even spiritual discipline. This can be experienced in the tape made of a 1974 performance of Lax's poems given by himself and Robert Wolf in 1974, resembling an uninflected incantation. When Mark Van Doren expressed his doubt about Lax's change in direction, the poet suggested that he might appreciate them more by reading them aloud in this way.

Karen Alexander comments on Lax's 1985 "Dark Earth Bright Sky", in which just those four words are repeated in different permutations: "We could not be more familiar with the simple contrasting elements in this poem, but we often allow the clutter of our lives to obscure our awareness of them. Lax meditates upon them and presents them anew… This is truly essential poetry, poetry with its roots deep in the universal foundation of the human consciousness". And Ryo Yamaguchi, in drawing a parallel between Lax's poetry and the minimalist procedures in the art of Donald Judd and in the music of Philip Glass and Steve Reich, also acknowledges the overlap into spirituality characteristic of the latter two.

== Spirituality ==
In the blurb for 33 Poems, William Maxwell, who had worked on The New Yorker with the poet, is quoted as commenting on Lax, "To the best of my knowledge, a saint is simply all the things that he is. If you placed him among the Old Testament figures above the south portal of Chartres, he wouldn't look odd." But although his output embodies a spiritual outlook, Lax was not a doctrinaire writer. He owed as much to eastern as to western systems of spirituality.

For several years, Lax practiced the method of meditation developed by Eknath Easwaran, and near the end of his life, Lax's only reading each day was from Easwaran.

== Interpretations ==
Lax composed a 35-minute Black/White Oratorio using only nine colour-words and 'and'. This, as it was later arranged by John Beer, was to be performed by a chorus of nine to fifteen people. Since 2014 there have been performances by the Los Angeles-based Readers Chorus.

Between 2011 and 2015 there have also been four visual interpretations of Lax poems by German animator Susanne Wiegner, three of them based on readings by Lax and another interpreting the printed text.

In 2018 Kile Smith composed The Arc in the Sky on nine texts of Robert Lax, described as a 65-minute pilgrimage for unaccompanied choir. The following year it was released commercially by Navona Records.

== Principal poetical works ==
- The Circus of the Sun (1959)
- New Poems (1962)
- Sea & Sky (1965)
- 33 Poems (1988)
- Rooster (1991)
- Love Had a Compass: Journals and Poetry (1996)
- A Thing That Is (1997)
- Circus Days and Nights (2000)

== Poems online ==
- Circus Days and Nights, The Overlook Press 2000
- Poems (1962–1997), Wave Books 2013
- A web anthology
- "5 Poems" 1962–70, Light & Dust
- "Kalymnos: November 29, 1968", an 11-part poem, Poetry Foundation
- Red Circle Blue Square, Journeyman Press 1971
- The Peacemaker's Handbook #1–4, 2001
- "the port/was longing", Less #2, Edinburgh, Essence Press 2009
- "Alley Violinist" read by Garrison Keillor
- "Aphorisms", Assembling magazine, Assembling Press 1970

== See also ==
- List of American poets
- Hermits
