= Theology of Pope Francis =

Theological effect of Pope Francis

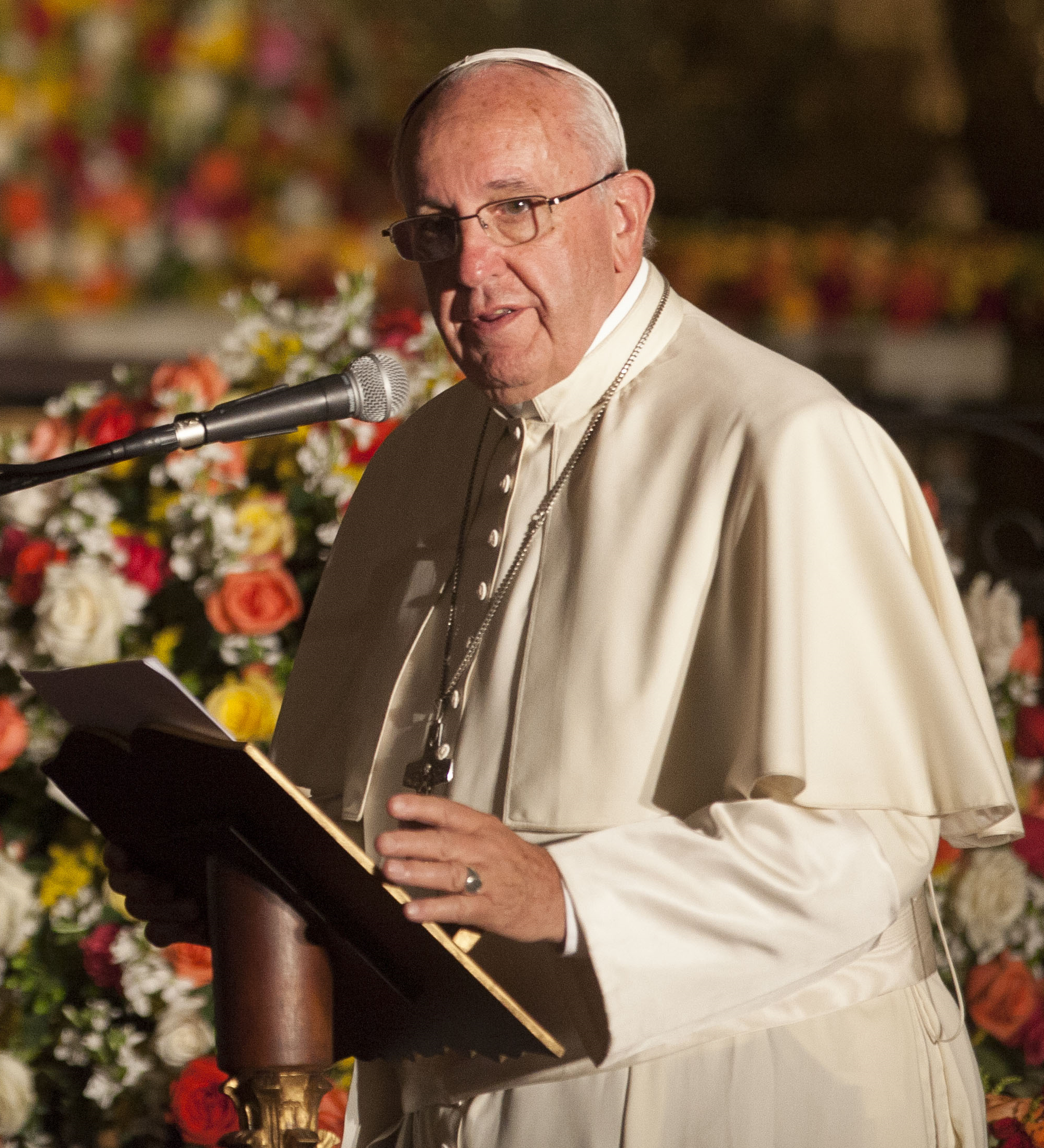
Pope Francis speaking in Quito, Ecuador, in 2015

Elected on 13 March 2013, Francis was the first member of the Society of Jesus to be appointed pope. He was also the first non-European to hold the office since Gregory III (r. 731–741). Francis described his papal name as pointing to what he wants to emulate in Saint Francis of Assisi: to have a poor church for the poor, to always go out to the margins, and to show concern for the natural environment.

Francis' papal motto, Miserando atque eligendo ("by having mercy and by choosing"), contained a central theme of his papacy, God's mercy, which led to conflict with some Catholics on issues such as the reception of Communion by remarried Catholics. In addressing real-life situations, Francis often appealed directly to his experience, in continuity with his synodal way, which shows a renewed emphasis on listening and dialogue. He also placed greater emphasis on church synods and on widespread consultation and dialogue, thus uplifting the roles of laypersons and of women in the Catholic church and criticizing clericalism.

Francis' concern for the poor was noted in his critiques of capitalism, his quite visible support of refugees and migrants, and his outreach to liberationist, anarchist, communist, socialist, and liberal movements in Latin America that were under a cloud during the papacy of John Paul II. Regarding his interpretation of the Doctrine of the Catholic Church, Francis stated that he considers himself to be conservative. (Note: In a 2019 interview, when asked about colleagues describing the pontiff as conservative in doctrine, Francis responded "Soy conservador" ("I am conservative").)

His apostolic exhortation, Evangelii gaudium (Joy of the Gospel), released eight months after his election, were described as programmatic and "a core document of this pontificate", which in his own words purports to point out "new paths for the Church's journey for years to come". He was also known for his "sharp and unscripted remarks".

== Vatican II revisited ==
Francis was described as being in close continuity with the Second Vatican Council of Catholic bishops (1962–1965) that strove to read the "signs of the times" and address new questions that had challenged the Catholic Church in the mid-twentieth century, such as its appeal to non-Western cultures. It has been suggested that the pontificate of Pope Francis will be looked upon as the "decisive moment in the history of the church in which the full force of the Second Vatican Council's reformist vision was finally realized". Specifically, Francis returned to the Vatican II theme of ressourcement, looking back beyond the Catholic philosophical tradition that had originated with Thomas Aquinas seven centuries before and looking toward original sources in the New Testament.

In contrast to Pope John Paul II (1978–2005) who emphasized continuity with the past in Vatican II's teachings, Francis' words and actions have been noted for their emphasis on Jesus himself and on mercy: a "church that is poor and for the poor", "disposal of the baroque trappings" in liturgical celebrations, and revision of the institutional aspects of the church.

From his first gesture since elected Pope, calling himself simply Bishop of Rome, Francis connected with the thrust of the council away from "legalism, triumphalism, and clericalism". Not only did he appoint more cardinals from the southern hemisphere, but he also made greater use of church synods and instituted a more collegial manner of governance by constituting a Council of Cardinal Advisers from throughout the world to assist him. A church historian called it the "most important step in the history of the church for the past 10 centuries". Fortune magazine, in March 2014, singled out this move in ranking Francis first among "the world's 50 greatest leaders". This might be seen as part of his implementation of Vatican II's call for a more collegial style of leadership and for reform of the Roman Curia.

Francis' refocusing the Church on "a moral theology that rests on scripture and Jesus' command to love" is also seen as coming from the council, as is his uplifting of the laity for mission and calling for the presence of women in theologates. He has also softened the "forbidding" image of the Church by applying Vatican II's views on respect for conscience to issues like atheism, homosexuality, and the sacraments. However, this has led to a struggle between "anti-Vatican II diehards and those clerics who prefer John XXIII's (and Francis') generosity of spirit". On the issue of liturgy, Francis has tried to advance the renewal initiated by Vatican II that would elicit more conscious, active participation by the people. While Francis' predecessors took a dim view of liberation theology, Francis' more positive view is seen as flowing from a discernment of "the signs of the times" called for by Gaudium et spes.

Additionally, Francis has said that "realities are more important than ideas". Through much of Francis' thought, there is an insistence on striking a new course, as well as creating tension between different aspects of Catholic teaching which he stated "must constantly be re-rooted in pastoral realities." He has been popular with people across religious lines from the start of his papacy.

Brendan Leahy, Bishop of Limerick, sees Francis' priorities as: formation of the clergy and laity to be capable of warming peoples' hearts, walking with them, dialoguing, and mending their brokenness; solidarity and collegiality; being in a permanent state of mission, with a maternal heart; and speaking up on social justice issues for the improvement of society.

According to the editors of a collection of essays on Francis, "the essence of Francis' theology is formed by a commitment to the poor and the marginalized, and unwillingness to pass moral judgment on others, a dislike of legalism and decrees from on high, and a distrust of monolithic institutions." Francis is very much at home with Dostoyevsky's phrase, "Beauty will save the world." "He's encouraging the Church to live joyfully in the power of Christ's presence, open to the wisdom of the Spirit."

== The Church's mission ==
Pope Francis, from the start of his papacy, has called for "a missionary impulse capable of transforming everything, so that the Church's customs... and structures can be suitably channeled for the evangelization of today's world rather than for her self-preservation". For Francis, "missionary outreach is paradigmatic for all the Church's activity", and it is "the entire People of God which evangelizes", called upon by their baptism to be missionary disciples. In his view, they should be troubled in conscience that so many live without the sense of purpose and consolation that comes from knowing Jesus Christ and without a faith community for support, with a church "too distant from their needs... a prisoner of its own rigid formulas". His emphasis on joy (Joy of the Gospel, Rejoice and be glad) "is an antidote to the disenchantment and melancholy of the world today", the joy of "doing good with the aim of reviving the spirit of the church". In Dilexit nos he reaffirms that "the greatest danger in mission is that, amid all the things we say and do, we fail to bring about a joyful encounter with the love of Christ who embraces us and saves us".

Francis was schooled in the Spiritual Exercises of the Jesuit founder Ignatius of Loyola, which immerse their reader in the life of Jesus to gain "an intimate knowledge of our Lord... that I may love Him more and follow Him more closely".

With regard to "tensions and conflicts in the church" under Francis, it has been suggested that "the reason for the uneasiness is the pope's emphasis on mission. There is a profound difference between a church that is a nest or a niche, in which one can find peace, tranquility and seeming stability, and a church that sees itself as missionary through and through – always going out, reaching out to the margins."

With regard to the Catholic's approach to those of other faiths, Francis said that "the worst thing of all is religious proselytism, which paralyzes: 'I am talking with you in order to persuade you.'" He has called for dialogue that allows for mutual growth by attraction. He also quotes Vatican II on the Church's continual need for reform. He speaks of the Church as "a mother with an open heart", constantly in need of communicating better, becoming "weak with the weak... everything for everyone" (1 Cor 9:22), never retreating into its own security or opting for "rigidity and defensiveness". To him, the Church "always does what good it can even if in the process its shoes get soiled by the mud of the street." He repeats what he told the Church in Buenos Aires, namely that he prefers a Church that is "bruised, hurting and dirty because it has been out on the streets, rather than a Church which is unhealthy from being confined and from clinging to its own security... caught up in a web of obsessions and procedures." Additionally, Francis decried an administrative approach that prevails over a pastoral approach, saying: "When the church does not emerge from itself to evangelize, it becomes self-referential and therefore becomes sick...The evils that, over time, occur in ecclesiastical institutions have their root in self-referentiality, a kind of theological narcissism."

In March 2016, three years into his papacy, Francis' overall rating in a WIN/GIA poll was higher than that of any secular leader. In October 2018, Kathryn Jean Lopez, editor at large of National Review, responded to conservative criticism of Francis by observing: "Pope Francis didn't start the fires that divide the Catholic Church. Under Francis, they are out in the open more, at the highest levels. There is certainly sunlight that is being shone on things that have been previously in the dark... He may just trust the Holy Spirit more than the rest of us to sort it out." Cardinal Michael Czerny has explained the attacks against Pope Francis by a minority in the church and society, stating that it means "he's on target".

== Church governance ==
Just two months into Francis' papacy, the theologian Hans Küng wrote the following piece on him that was carried in both progressive and secular media:

It is astonishing how, from the first minute of his election, Pope Francis chose a new style: unlike his predecessor, no miter with gold and jewels, no ermine-trimmed cape, no made-to-measure red shoes and headwear, no magnificent throne. Astonishing, too, that the new pope deliberately abstains from solemn gestures and high-flown rhetoric and speaks in the language of the people. And finally it is astonishing how the new pope emphasizes his humanity: He asked for the prayers of the people before he gave them his blessing; settled his own hotel bill like anybody else; showed his friendliness to the cardinals in the coach, in their shared residence, at the official goodbye; washed the feet of young prisoners, including those of a young Muslim woman. A pope who demonstrates that he is a man with his feet on the ground.

The washing of the feet angered many Catholic traditionalists. Pope Francis had performed the Lenten washing of the feet, traditionally at Archbasilica of Saint John Lateran, at a juvenile detention home and included two girls and two Muslims. He stated that he wanted to bring the church closer to the poor and marginalized so as to be in service of one another.

Many such choices of Francis have drawn notice in the press: his choice of living in the Vatican guesthouse rather than in the Apostolic Palace; his standing, rather than sitting in the papal throne, while receiving the accustomed congratulations from his fellow cardinals; no pontifical gold pectoral cross but the one he used in Argentina; providing a simple "good evening" before his first papal Urbi et Orbi message ("to the city and world"); riding home to Casa Santa Marta not in the papal limousine but with his fellow bishops and cardinals in the last minibus; and emphasizing that his fundamental role is to be Bishop of Rome.

The Economist commented that previous popes had avoided the name "Francis" so as not to be connected with Francis of Assisi who had given up family, wealth and career, and splendid clothing to follow Christ in utter poverty. Francis explained to journalists that he chose the name because Francis was a "poor man, a simple man, as we would like a poor church, for the poor," adding: "Right away, with regard to the poor, I thought of St. Francis of Assisi, then I thought of war... Francis loved peace and that is how the name came to me." He also said he admired Francis of Assisi's concern for the natural environment.

=== Decentralization and synodal governance ===
Decentralizing the Church away from the Vatican, thus giving more control to local bishops' conferences, continued through 2017 "in line with the Pope's vision laid out in his 2013 apostolic exhortation Evangelii Gaudium (The Joy of the Gospel)". Noted examples were the provision in Amoris Laetitia (2016), which argued that local conferences should oversee the issue of civilly remarried divorcees receiving Communion, as well as his recent letter on liturgical translations, Magnum principium (2017), which reduced Vatican oversight over translations into local languages. Seeing the Holy See as "at the service of the local Churches" has been a part of Francis' effort to create a "mentality of service" in the Church. Four years into his papacy, however, Francis experienced outspoken criticism from a few high-ranking conservatives in the Church over letting local bishops make decisions on Communion for divorced and remarried Catholics.

Francis has spoken of consensus-building through more open dialogue in synods of bishops. Some analysts said that "transforming the meetings from an austere formality into a platform for energetic debate may go on to be seen as Francis' greatest achievement." In his apostolic constitution Episcopalis communio, Francis introduced a more direct process whereby a final synodal document became a part of the Church's magisterium simply by receiving papal approval. The new constitution also provided for the laity to send their contributions directly to the synod's secretary general. Additionally, Francis called for attention to the sensus fidei, or "instinct of faith", especially of the poor, whereby the Catholic faithful discern what is of God through a conaturality or intuitive wisdom.

Francis has decried the imbalance that can occur "when we speak more about law than about grace, more about the Church than about Christ, more about the Pope than about God's word." Francis' efforts toward a "healthy decentralisation" of the Church have polarized opinion within the Roman Curia and in the church in general. Some fear this can dilute the universal message, sow confusion, and further divide the church. The struggle that began early in Francis' papacy, between "anti-Vatican II diehards and those clerics who prefer John XXIII's (and Francis') generosity of spirit", had become "unique in its visibility" by 2018, with bookstores carrying titles like Lost Shepherd, The Dictator Pope, and The Political Pope: How Pope Francis is Delighting the Left and Abandoning Conservatives.

=== Clericalism ===
Henri de Lubac, a fellow Jesuit, "played a key role in shaping the Council's take on ecclesiology," with a primary concern for understanding the Church as "a community of the whole People of God, rather than just the clergy – a concept which can still be heard in Francis' continual blasting of clericalism and his references to the 'one, holy People of God.'" Francis has emphasized that the "hour of the laity" has arrived and decried clericalism as rife in the Church, stating that it "leads to the functionalization of the laity, treating them as 'messengers'." Through clericalism, he stated, a priest "can become seduced by the prospect of a career... turning him into a functionary, a cleric worried more about himself, about organizations and structures, than about the true good of the People of God". He has spoken of the "eighth sacrament" that some priests would create—the "pastoral customs office" that would close doors on people instead of facilitating their reception of the sacraments. Addressing apostolic nuncios, who recommend to the pope good candidates for episcopal appointment, Francis said:

In the delicate task of carrying out inquiries for episcopal appointments be careful that the candidates are pastors close to the people, fathers and brothers, that they are gentle, patient and merciful; animated by inner poverty, the freedom of the Lord and also by outward simplicity and austerity of life, that they do not have the psychology of "Princes".

Francis wants "a church based not on fancy vestments and infallible pronouncements, but on love of God and love of others". He has been critical of a church that is preoccupied with small-minded rules and is a museum for the saintly few rather than, with missionary zeal, being a place of welcome for the many. For the church's clergy, Francis sees "the need to hold both action and contemplation in creative tension," to be leaders who are led by God's grace, contemplatives in action. He has castigated and taken action against clerics whom he sees as living a princely life. Francis said clergy should be shepherds looking after the people, but knows they can be tempted and corrupted by power. When they take from the people instead of giving, simony and other corruption can follow. Love between the clergy and the people is destroyed.

Francis fears that some clerics "become wolves and not shepherds... careerism and the search for a promotion [to the hierarchy] come under the category of spiritual worldliness," deceitfully trying to appear holy. Francis is known for his "snarky" remarks. He said of clerical vanity: "Look at the peacock; it's beautiful if you look at it from the front. But if you look at it from behind, you discover the truth... Whoever gives in to such self-absorbed vanity has huge misery hiding inside them." In 2014, he admonished 138 newly appointed bishops not to surround themselves with "courtiers, climbers, and yes-men" but to bring people the Gospel that makes people free.

In his efforts to undercut clericalism and careerism in the Catholic Church, Francis stopped bestowing the title of "Monsignor" on secular priests under the age of 65. He always preferred that people call him "Father" rather than "My Lord", "Your Grace", or "Your Eminence", as "Father" best reflects the priestly mission. Of this preference, a bishop with experience working in the Vatican noted the general feeling that, while formerly being treated like branch managers, "We're treated now as brothers".

Speaking to 120 superiors of religious orders, Francis kept up his campaign against clericalism, saying that seminary formation must be "a work of art, not a police action" where seminarians "grit their teeth, try not to make mistakes, follow the rules smiling a lot, just waiting for the day when they are told 'Good, you have finished formation.'" He further stated that "This is hypocrisy that is the result of clericalism, which is one of the worst evils" and that priestly formation "must form their hearts. Otherwise we are creating little monsters. And then these little monsters mold the people of God. This really gives me goose bumps."

Picking up on Bishop de Smedt's much-quoted remark, at the Second Vatican Council, that the Catholic church was suffering from triumphalism, clericalism, and legalism, Francis described the Church's "temptation to triumphalism... a Church that is content with what it is or has – well sorted, well organized, with all its offices, everything in order, everything perfect, efficient". But this, he said, is "a Church that denies its martyrs, because it does not know that martyrs are needed". A healthy Church, on the other hand, recognizes "triumph through failure – human failure – the failure of the Cross."

=== Theology ===
Austen Ivereigh, in writing a biography of Francis, described him as having the rare combination of "the political genius of a charismatic leader and the prophetic holiness of a desert saint", the later being a characteristic of his theology. Ivereigh also stated those who think that Francis "speaks to the emotions and not to the intelligence... don't know Bergoglio, who has had an impressive formation in many fields." For his dissertation work, Francis studied Romano Guardini's idea of holding conflicting notions in tension in a multicultural world, to respect "polar tensions" without negating any of them or reducing them to a higher synthesis, and to respond to each in the light of the gospel.

Francis also said that "theological freedom" is necessary to experience new paths and to "develop different facets of the inexhaustible riches of the Gospel". To some, he has softened the image of an institution that had seemed forbidding during the time of his predecessor, Benedict, and shown that a pope can hold thoroughly modern views on atheism ("The issue for those who do not believe in God is to obey their conscience"), homosexuality ("If a person is gay and seeks God and has goodwill, who am I to judge?"), and single mothers (he has accused priests who refuse to baptise their children of having a "sick mentality").

Francis has also given encouragement to theologians who, at times, found themselves in an adversarial relationship during John Paul's papacy, a time when, according to Jason Horowitz of The New York Times, the conservative wing of the church dominated and when there was a revival of the importance given to scholastic philosophy. One extended coverage of Francis' differences with the previous papacies summarized, succinctly, that Francis "revealed his own obsessions to be more in line with the boss' son" by opting to live in a two-room apartment; by saying that ecclesiastics should not be obsessed with issues like homosexuality, birth control and abortion; and by scathingly criticizing unchecked free-market capitalism. Francis spoke of the "decadent scholasticism" of his time and has called for openness to "differing currents of thought in philosophy, theology, and pastoral practice", stating that being "in dialogue with other sciences and human experiences is most important for our discernment on how best to bring the Gospel message to different cultural contexts and groups." Francis has also expressed a want for a more "welcoming church" and "has decried a church that is inward-looking and self-referential... (It) must be prepared to go out to the peripheries, to encounter others in dialogue," and "in solidarity with the 'castaways of history'."

Francis' meeting with the Russian Orthodox patriarch was the first such for a pope since the 11th Century East–West Schism. Additionally, a meeting with Sheikh Ahmed el-Tayeb, the highest authority in Sunni Islam, could not have come about without Francis' numerous conciliatory gestures toward the Muslim world, including his visiting migrants on the island of Lesbos and bringing three Syrian Muslim families back to the Vatican City. Francis' visit to the Arabian Peninsula, the home of Islam, also marked a historic first for a pope, of immense significance, thus bringing hope for "a new era of religious tolerance in the Gulf". Francis has additionally reached out to the Pentecostal churches, which some have called "a new and heretofore scarcely imaginable step forward". Francis was also the first Pope to meet with the leader of the Church of Jesus Christ of Latter-day Saints.

Francis has not continued the attacks on secularism that were common during Pope Benedict XVI's papacy (2005–2013). Francis said:

The complaints of today about how "barbaric" the world is, these complaints sometimes end up giving birth within the church to desires to establish order in the sense of pure conservation, as a defense. No: God is to be encountered in the world of today... God manifests himself in time and is present in the processes of history.

To find God in today's world, Francis frequently calls for "discernment", an important notion from the Jesuit founder's Spiritual Exercises. Francis said that by discernment, one could "avoid a kind of legalism" and help people conform to the image of Christ. Francis has also noted that a "parliamentary approach" leaves one "entrenched in 'his truth,'... Thus, walking together becomes impossible". In the synodal approach, according to Francis, one must "learn to listen, in community, to what the Spirit says to the Church". Francis also said that "ultimately people have responsibility for their own lives and salvation," that "he does not have all the answers," and "that he can live with doubt. He often points to the importance of discernment... He is critical of 'those who today always look for the disciplinarian solutions, those who long for an exaggerated doctrinal 'security'... He is steering Catholics away from the dogmatism and legalism of the past and the old-time religion and proposing a more nuanced approach to morality." He is seen as following a more inductive (beginning with the person) rather than deductive (from past teachings) approach to situations arising, following the "See-Judge-Act" method in applying Catholic social teaching.

Time magazine selected Francis "Person of the Year" in the first year of his papacy, writing:

What makes this Pope so important is the speed with which he has captured the imaginations of millions who had given up on hoping for the church at all. People weary of the endless parsing of sexual ethics, the buck-passing infighting over lines of authority when all the while (to borrow from Milton), "the hungry Sheep look up, and are not fed". In a matter of months, Francis has elevated the healing mission of the church – the church as servant and comforter of hurting people in an often harsh world – above the doctrinal police work so important to his recent predecessors.

=== Roles for women ===
Francis does not see women being ordained to the ministerial priesthood. However, he said: "Our great dignity derives from Baptism... When we speak of sacramental power 'we are in the realm of function, not that of dignity or holiness'," and he added:

Many women share pastoral responsibilities with priests, helping to guide people, families, and groups and offering new contributions to theological reflection. But we need to create still broader opportunities for a more incisive female presence in the Church ... in the various other settings where important decisions are made.

Looking ahead, he said that many women are well prepared to contribute to religious and theological discussions at the highest levels alongside their male counterparts. It is more necessary than ever that they do so, according to Francis, "because women look at reality with a different, a greater richness." In the first six years of Francis' papacy, "the profile of women, especially women religious, at Vatican events has risen sharply." Francis also asked universities to accept laypeople and particularly women alongside seminarians, since "the contribution that women are giving and can give to theology is indispensable" and must be supported.

Additionally, Francis set up a commission to study the history of women as deaconesses in the Catholic Church, but after two years, it maintained "sharply different positions" and disbanded. The issue was whether the blessing deaconesses received in the early church amounted to ordination, as well as whether they performed tasks similar those of male deacons. Francis then acknowledged further need of study. In 2014, Francis appointed the first woman ever as a voting member of a Vatican congregation, the Congregation for the Evangelization of Peoples. Then, in 2019, he appointed seven religious sisters to full membership in the Congregation for Institutes of Consecrated Life and Societies of Apostolic Life and four women as consultors to the secretariat of the Synod of Bishops, which Christopher Lamb of The Tablet described as "crucial" for setting Pope Francis' agenda.

In January 2021, Francis promulgated Spiritus Domini, which modified Canon Law to admit women to the instituted ministries of lector and acolyte. As these had previously been considered minor orders and closed to women, Pope Francis wrote that a doctrinal development had occurred in this regard.

=== Married priests ===
Celibacy has never been regarded as a divine law for priests. Francis expressed his openness to consider having some older married men ordained, especially in mission areas where there was an extreme shortage of priests.

== Pastoral sense ==
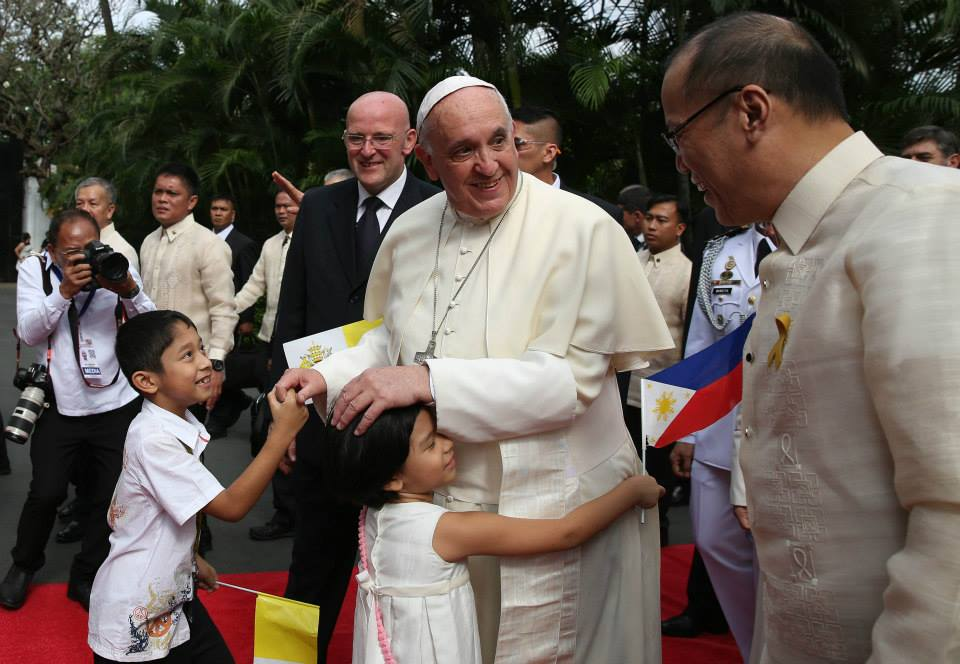
Francis in the Philippines

In his letter Amoris Laetitia ("The Joy of Love"), Francis advocated for flexibility, tolerance, and compassion in the Church. He wrote: "By thinking that everything is black and white, we sometimes close off the way of grace and of growth." The confessional, he said,

... must not be a torture chamber but rather an encounter with the Lord's mercy which spurs us on to do our best. A small step, in the midst of great human limitations, can be more pleasing to God than a life which appears outwardly in order but moves through the day without confronting great difficulties.

He quoted St. Ambrose: the Communion bread "is not a prize for the perfect but a powerful medicine and nourishment for the weak." Such talk led a few cardinals in the church to speak of an impending schism.

On his visit to the United States, Francis decried: "A Christianity which 'does' little in practice, while incessantly 'explaining' its teachings, is dangerously unbalanced", bringing to mind his saying that "a supposed soundness of doctrine or discipline leads instead to a narcissistic and authoritarian elitism whereby, instead of evangelizing, one analyzes and classifies others, and instead of opening the door to grace, one exhausts his or her energies in inspecting and verifying". Francis had earlier warned about hiding behind "the appearance of piety and even love for the church" while seeking "human glory and personal well-being" and emphasizing certain rules of a "particular Catholic style from the past."

Francis has also advised priests that "the Church must be a place of mercy freely given, where everyone can feel welcomed, loved, forgiven and encouraged to live the good life of the Gospel." He has additionally mentioned the "aggressive and warlike" approach of the past toward preserving racial and doctrinal purity. He stated that people best serve the Gospel "not by wielding the doctrine of the church as a club" but by meeting the people "'in the streets', listening to their concerns and attending to their wounds" and knowing "through a pastoral 'connaturality' how the church's doctrine can best be employed to announce God's solidarity with the poor and suffering of this world, and the profligate mercy of God."

Francis said that, in docility to the work of the Spirit, people should proclaim the faith without proselytizing, rather with dialogue with peoples, cultures, and different religious traditions, following "the evangelical criterion of mercy".

Francis stuck to his informal ways while baptizing 32 babies in the Sistine Chapel, inviting the women to breastfeed their children there "if they are hungry." While almost unheard of during Catholic church services in Italy, this has been regarded as another of his efforts "to break down the stiff protocol in the Vatican."

== The Church's liturgy and devotions ==
The editors of Go into the Streets! wrote that "Pope Francis inherited a Church which in many ways had moved away from the vision of the Second Vatican Council." John F. Baldovin described Francis' motu proprio Magnum Principium (3 September 2017) as:

... certainly a significant change in direction with regard to who has responsibility for liturgical translations. The pope has changed Canon 838 in two important ways. The weight of responsibility now falls much more on the shoulders of the various episcopal conferences... Those conferences which have been experiencing tension with the Vatican over revised translations, like the French-speaking and German-speaking, now have much more breathing room in deciding what is best for translating liturgical texts.

This effectively countered the efforts of those who, under pope John Paul II, had required that "the liturgy conform as closely as possible to the original Latin texts." In his motu proprio, Francis said: "The vernacular languages themselves, often only in a progressive manner, would be able to become liturgical languages, standing out in a not dissimilar way to liturgical Latin for their elegance of style and the profundity of their concepts with the aim of nourishing the faith." This was seen, by Jason Horowitz, as the end of the "reform of the reform" movement that sought to overturn the principles of liturgical reform proposed by the Second Vatican Council. As Francis expressed it, "to speak of 'the reform of the reform' is an error!" Earlier, Francis had written: "We cannot demand that peoples of every continent, in expressing their Christian faith, imitate modes of expression which European nations developed at a particular moment of their history."

Francis also broke with Vatican tradition by celebrating a Mass in Chiapas, Mexico, that incorporated indigenous, Mayan elements. Additionally, he encouraged the Mexican bishops to show similar, "singular tenderness in the way you regard indigenous peoples". He distanced himself from the previous popes who gave broad permission for reversion to the Mass in Latin. Also, Francis has spoken against efforts to encourage priests to celebrate Mass ad orientem and has called "the altar, the centre toward which our churches focus attention."

Of the Eucharistic celebration, Francis said: "A sacrament is not 'a magical rite' but rather the instrument God has chosen in order to continue to walk beside man as his traveling companion through life." In a brief address to liturgists on the anniversary of Musicam sacram, Francis mentioned, eight times, the importance of the peoples' active participation in song. In an address to charismatics, he reemphasized this. He said that since he had the upper portion of his right lung removed, he is too short of breath to sing the Mass.

Reflecting on the deep meaning of the Communion bread, he draws on Paul's epistles that point to oneness as Christ's body, where all suffer together and are honored together (1 Cor 12:26). Communion, he says, is not "a private prayer or a beautiful spiritual exercise" but a means of one's transformation, one's taking on the heart of Christ: peaceable, forgiving, reconciling, in solidarity with all.

Francis has explained how sacraments are means or instruments, not ends in themselves. He went on to state that true disciples encounter the Lord in the sacraments and receive the power to follow Jesus' teaching, that one cannot cover up injustice, dishonesty, and uncharitableness against one's neighbor with prayers and devotions. Of his encyclical Gaudete et exsultate, his emphasis on good works as a means to holiness, Alan L. Anderson observed: "I find it curious so little attention is paid in His Holiness's exhortation to the pivotal role played by the sacraments in attaining holiness. Indeed, to attempt holiness without them would be, well, to flirt with neo-Pelagianism." However, Francis has himself emphasized the importance of making the sacraments easily available to all, often amidst difficult circumstances today, and to keep donations anonymous lest sacraments seem to have a price.

=== Privatized devotions ===
Francis has said: "It is sad to encounter a privatized Church, as this form of selfishness indicates a lack of faith." He has criticized people who promote privatized devotion while neglecting the formation of the laity toward the advancement of society. In addressing charismatics, Francis insisted that their efforts must go beyond converting people to Catholicism, toward caring for the needy and working for justice. He has also said that "The Eucharist is not a private prayer" but should transform our life into Jesus' own "dynamism of love", making us "people of peace, people of forgiveness, of reconciliation, of sharing in solidarity." Regarding the relationship between private piety and public life, Francis was the first pontiff to suggest automatic excommunication for the mafia at an outdoor Mass in Calabria: "Those who in their life have gone along the evil ways, as in the case of the mafia, they are not with God, they are excommunicated."

Francis also called out the "foolishness" of those who would increase the titles and devotions offered to Mary, adding that "She never wanted for herself something that was of her son," but was herself a disciple of Jesus.

== Primacy of charity ==
Francis has said: "The Lord has redeemed all of us, all of us... even the atheists. Everyone!... We are created children in the likeness of God... and we all have a duty to do good". He pointed to the Last Judgment scene in the Gospel of Matthew as proof of how God judges: what is done for the poor, the hungry, the indigent, the outcast, those who suffer and are alone, Jesus regards as done to himself (25:37-40). Francis also pointed to the Beatitudes as showing what gives deep happiness, what Catholics should strive to live up to every day: being poor in spirit and meek and humble of heart, merciful and peacemakers, hungering and thirsting for righteousness. He devoted most of a chapter in Gaudete et exsultate to explaining these Beatitudes as the way to holiness for everyone (63–94).

In response to the secularization of society in the "post-Christian West", Francis has proposed a new approach to evangelization different from his predecessors' emphasis on fidelity to doctrine. He has called for greater attention to Catholic social teaching for which people seek a faith response: economic equality, the rights of migrants, and efforts to counteract global warming. But Robert Royal, editor of The Catholic Thing, stated that with regard to these very matters, "the Vatican's misjudgments are all too commonplace" and that "The Vatican currently pursues a steady line of anti-Western criticism, against the alleged xenophobia, rapacious economies, and environmental 'sins' of both Europe and North America".

=== Option for the poor ===
"I would like a Church that is poor and is for the poor," Francis said following his election. The pontiff said he had chosen the name Francis in a direct reference to Francis of Assisi, the founder of the Franciscan Order, who was devoted to the poor. In his first meeting with the media, the new pope explained further: Francis of Assisi was "a man of poverty, a man of peace, a man who loves and safeguards creation... (who) would like a poor church for the poor." Richard L. Clarke, Anglican Primate of All Ireland, said that while Francis' "insistence that the poor of the world are Christ's deepest concern" may not be new, his "simplicity of lifestyle... has undoubtedly conveyed a new impetus and purpose for all Christians." "Attention for the poor has become the trademark of Francis' pontificate," the most visible priority of his papacy. He believes that "poverty for us Christians is... a theological category."

Francis' leadership has reflected his conviction that "good leadership looks like Jesus in action", and he has stated: "Jesus made himself poor to walk along the road with us." For Francis, the church should be "poor and for the poor" with "creative concern and effective cooperation in helping the poor to live with dignity and reaching out to everyone." Without this, according to Francis, all the religious practices and talk of social issues will be just a camouflage.

Francis has expected some to be offended by his words but would help "those who are in thrall to an individualistic, indifferent, and self-centred mentality, to... bring dignity to their presence on this earth." He has also said that "it is a well-known fact that current levels of production are sufficient, yet millions of people are still suffering and dying of starvation. This is truly scandalous." He additionally said: "God always forgives, but the earth does not... It is painful to see the struggle against hunger and malnutrition hindered by market priorities, the primacy of profit, which reduce foodstuffs to a commodity like any other, subject to speculation and financial speculation in particular... We ask for dignity, not for charity."

=== Refugees and migrants ===
Francis has been in the forefront of insisting on the importance of helping refugees. When visiting the United States border with Mexico, he said: "A person who thinks only about building walls – wherever they may be – and not building bridges, is not Christian." His later suggestion "to not raise walls but bridges" was also widely interpreted by the media as addressed to U.S. President Donald Trump. It was later repeated by Francis with regards to Trump's immigration policy. Francis has said that "to speak properly of our own rights, we need to broaden our perspective and to hear the plea of other peoples and other regions than those of our own country". In turning one's back on migrants and refugees, Pope Francis has observed a new "globalization of indifference", his "disembodied Jesus who demands nothing of us with regard to others."

Jesuit John Zupez wrote, "In his programmatic exhortation Evangelii Gaudium, after just three sentences of introduction, Francis launches into a call for a more expansive Christian spirit: 'The great danger in today's world, pervaded as it is by consumerism, is the desolation and anguish born of a complacent yet covetous heart, the feverish pursuit of frivolous pleasures, and a blunted conscience.' Francis further decries seeking comfort in 'a small circle of close friends' or in religious exercises that 'do not encourage encounter with others'". Francis has also remarked that "if investments in banks fall, it is a tragedy and people say 'what are we going to do?' but if people die of hunger, have nothing to eat or suffer from poor health, that's nothing." Francis further added that a church that is poor and for the poor must fight this mentality.

Inspired by Pope Francis' devotion to the poor, the Vatican-owned Santa Maria church offers beds to homeless migrants in the nave of the church under priceless Renaissance frescoes. In September 2019, on the Church's 105th World Day of Migrants and Refugees, a new statue was installed in St. Peter's Square for the first time in 400 years. The 20-foot tall bronze sculpture depicts a group of 140, life-size migrants and refugees from various cultural backgrounds and time periods traveling together on a boat. It has been described as "a testament to Pope Francis' enduring concern for the plight of refugees and migrants."

== Capitalism ==
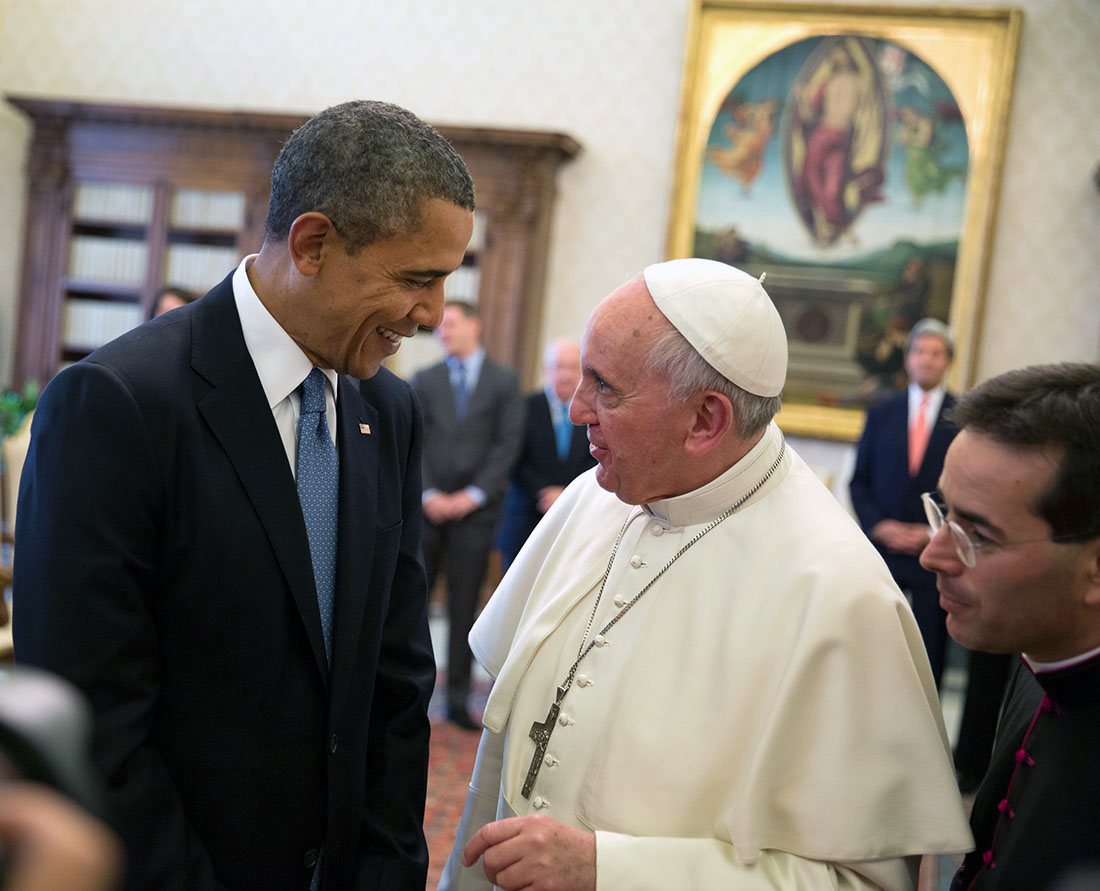
Pope Francis with the US President Barack Obama

Francis' critique of capitalism is consistent with that of Pope John Paul II in Centesimus annus. Francis, from the start of his papacy, has attacked the harm done to the poor by what he calls the sin of market speculation. Back in Buenos Aires, he was known as the "slum bishop" because of his frequent visits to shantytowns. Since becoming pope, Francis has stated that his church should be closer to the poor and has thus been attacking the global economic system based on "a god of money". He also told the United Nations leaders that the organization's future sustainable development goals should stress the "structural causes of poverty and hunger".

Francis' first apostolic exhortation to the Church, Evangelii gaudium, had what was described as "blistering attacks on income inequality" in the status quo "culture of prosperity" that "deadens us" to the misery of the poor who with "lives stunted for lack of opportunity seem a mere spectacle; they fail to move us." One statement that attracted widespread media attention was: "As long as the problems of the poor are not radically resolved by rejecting the absolute autonomy of markets and financial speculation, and by attacking the structural causes of inequality, no solution will be found for the world's problems or, for that matter, to any problems."

An Italian journalist found that Francis' comments on capitalism in Evangelii gaudium "hit the mark", thus provoking a host of prominent spokespersons for capitalism. The journalist added: "Pope Francis is not afraid to proclaim to the world the limits, obvious to everyone after the 2008 financial crisis (in the United States), of an economic model that, left to itself, is likely to overwhelm the world." In other words, Francis was looking for long-term intervention by political entities for the improvement of economic systems, not for the overthrow of these systems; his long-range view has been consistent with church tradition, with recent pontiffs, and with his prioritizing of "time over space".

Francis has "put the poor, the problems of inequality and structural injustice, at the heart of the church's mission, and therefore at the heart of Christian spirituality and living." Addressing foreign ambassadors at the Vatican in 2013, Francis called for more government controls over their economies, describing as a new "golden calf" the worship of money, in an economy that fails to provide for the common good. Francis has also said that wealth from financial and commodities speculation is scandalous and compromised the poor's access to food. He calls inequality "the root of all social ills" and places on economic and government leaders the responsibility to address its structural causes and to assure all citizens access to education, dignified work, and healthcare. He finds this essential to solving any of the world's problems.

Francis has additionally criticized the theory of trickle-down economics, which claims that policies that disproportionality benefit the wealthy will lead to widespread prosperity for all, a theory that has been maintained by the Republican Party in the United States. Francis also said some people "continue to defend trickle-down theories", a belief that "has never been confirmed by the facts." He characterized this as sacralizing the economic system with a "crude and naive trust in the goodness of those wielding economic power."

Author Elisabetta Piqué, a close friend of Francis, wrote: "Francis wants to break down the wall between the North and South of the world... (in) the new 'cold war' that he must win over selfishness." After hosting successful negotiations for a reconciliation between Cuba and the United States, Francis was praised by President Obama for showing "the importance of pursuing the world as it should be, rather than simply settling for the world as it is." President Raúl Castro, a product of Jesuit education, said the teachings of Pope Francis had both persuaded him to take a softer line on religion and to perhaps return to the Catholic Church. He said: "If the Pope continues to speak like this, sooner or later I will start praying again and I will return to the Catholic Church – and I'm not saying this jokingly."

In his third encyclical, Fratelli tutti, Francis strongly condemned neoliberal orthodoxy in the wake of the COVID-19 pandemic. He asserted that "the marketplace, by itself, cannot resolve every problem, however much we are asked to believe this dogma of neoliberal faith" and that the pandemic exposed "a fragmentation that made it more difficult to resolve problems that affect us all". He added that "anyone who thinks that the only lesson to be learned was the need to improve what we were already doing, or to refine existing systems and regulations, is denying reality." Francis continues to dialogue with the umbrella organization Guardians of Inclusive Capitalism, which has represented companies with over $2.1 trillion in market capitalization and 200 million workers.

In January 2024, during a meeting with the Dialop Transversal dialogue project, Francis encouraged Christians and socialists to work together to build a better world and combat the "triple scourge" of corruption, lawlessness, and abuse of power. He also emphasized that "civilization is measured" by the way the vulnerable—the poor, unemployed, homeless, immigrants, and the exploited—are treated.

=== Backlash ===
While Christian ethics has generally taught that the earth's richness is meant for the common good, Francis has been called a Marxist for his demand for more equality. Rush Limbaugh, a conservative commentator in the United States, called the pope's message "pure Marxism". The billionaire Kenneth Langone warned Cardinal Timothy M. Dolan that such remarks could doom the financial support needed to restore St. Patrick's Cathedral in New York.

Responding in general to those who have called him a Marxist, Francis said that "Marxist ideology is wrong. But I have met many Marxists in my life who are good people, so I don't feel offended...There is nothing in the exhortation that cannot be found in the social doctrine of the church." Furthermore, in 2014, Francis said: "The communists have stolen our flag. The flag of the poor is Christian. Poverty is at the center of the Gospel", whereas communism came "twenty centuries later".

Additionally, Francis took the occasion of his address to the U.S. Congress in 2015 to acknowledge the benefits of capitalism and to clarify that he did not advocate for Marxism. Francis instead suggested that Jesus can be found in others' faces, voices, and pleas that constantly call us to live in fraternity.

== Environment ==
Pope Francis, in his encyclical Laudato si' (Praise be to you) of May 2015, used the highest level of papal teaching to draw attention to "our sin" of destroying the natural environment. In it, Francis called for a "broad cultural revolution" among all peoples to confront the environmental crisis.

Tara Isabella Burton of The Atlantic saw as a change of emphasis in church teaching, toward reconciliation with the created world in a way that was "radically and profoundly, pro-life". Columnist James Martin described the encyclical as "revolutionary", "a systematic overview of the crisis from a religious point of view". The New York Times summarized that "Francis reiterated the established science that burning fossil fuels are warming the planet, said the impact threatened the world's poor, and called for government policies to cut fossil fuel use."

As he prepared for the encyclical, Francis had sponsored a Pontifical Academy of Sciences summit meeting in April 2015 that focused on the relationships connecting poverty, economic development, and climate change. The meeting included presentations and discussions by scientists, religious leaders, and economists. The United Nations secretary general, Ban Ki-moon, who urged world leaders to approve a climate-change accord in Paris at the 2015 United Nations Climate Change Conference in December 2015, delivered the keynote address. Then, in June 2019, in a meeting at the Vatican which climatologist Hans Joachim Schellnhuber described as one of the most significant of his 30-year career, Francis "convinced big oil CEOs to alter their message on climate change." This meeting included CEOs of ExxonMobil, BP, Royal Dutch Shell, and Chevron who then pledged to avert what Francis called "a climate emergency" that risked "perpetrating a brutal act of injustice towards the poor and future generations." Francis "stressed the need for a radical energy transition to save our common home." The CEOs then pledged to "advance the energy transition... while minimizing the costs to vulnerable communities."

In 2019, Francis stated that ecocide was a sin and should be made "a fifth category of crimes against peace, which should be recognised as such by the international community."

In 2021, it was revealed that starting in 2022, the Pope would use an electric popemobile modeled after the Fisker Ocean SUV. The environment-friendly popemobile was to be designed and constructed by the California-based EV start-up company Fisker Inc.

At the beginning of the 2021 United Nations Climate Change Conference, in Glasgow, Scotland, which Francis did not attend, he instead sent Cardinal Pietro Parolin. Francis later said of the summit: "May this encounter yield efficient answers offering concrete hope to future generations." He added that Christians should pray for the "cry of the Earth."

In May 2024, at a meeting of the States General on Natality, Francis encouraged young people to go against the trend and have children, saying: "The problem with our world is not children being born. It's selfishness, consumerism, individualism, which render people complacent, alone, and unhappy." He disagreed with the idea of population control to avoid economic, environmental, and health crises, saying human life is not a problem but a gift. The next month, he issued an apostolic letter titled Fratello sole ("Brother sun", referring to Saint Francis' Canticle of the Sun), ordering the Vatican to construct an agrivoltaics facility on its land holdings on the outskirts of Rome, as a gesture of the Church towards the environmental movement.

== Morality as a vehicle of God's mercy ==
Francis has called mercy "the keystone of the life of faith" by which people "give visibility to the Resurrection of Jesus." In opening the Extraordinary Jubilee of Mercy year, Francis spoke of how it "wrongs God when we speak of sins being punished by judgment before we speak of their being forgiven by God's mercy".

Cardinal Walter Kasper has called mercy "the key word of his pontificate... (while) Scholastic theology has neglected this topic and turned it into a mere subordinate theme of justice." Francis has described mercy as "the very substance of the Gospel of Jesus" and asked theologians to reflect this in their work. In his encyclical on holiness for everyone, Gaudete et exsultate, mercy was the focal theme: "What is Pope Francis' overall summary of holiness? It's based on the Beatitudes: 'Seeing and acting with mercy'." "Francis' watchword is mercy, but mercy adheres, first, not in alterations of doctrine but in the new way that Catholics are invited to think of doctrine," in pastoral practice and conformity with what "Jesus wants – a Church attentive to the goodness which the Holy Spirit sows in the midst of human weakness." Francis emphasized this by washing the feet of prisoners which was, for some, people a shocking gesture.

In its spirit of aggiornamento, Vatican II perceived a need for making the manuals of moral theology more relevant toward peoples' real-life situations, and, as Cardinal Montini pointed out, toward "audacious change" that "subordinated law to charity." Francis, in turn, has said that "Christian morality is not a form of stoicism, or self-denial, or merely a practical philosophy, or a catalogue of sins and faults. Before all else, the Gospel invites us to respond to the God of love who saves us, to see God in others, and to go forth from ourselves to seek the good of others."

Saint Thomas Aquinas pointed out that the precepts which Christ and the apostles gave to the people of God "are very few". Citing Saint Augustine, he noted that the precepts subsequently enjoined by the Church should be insisted upon with moderation "so as not to burden the lives of the faithful" and make our religion a form of servitude, whereas "God's mercy has willed that we should be free".

Francis also warned against "codification of the faith in rules and regulations, as the scribes, the Pharisees, the doctors of the law did in the time of Jesus. To us, everything will be clear and set in order, but the faithful and those in search will still hunger and thirst for God." He went on to describe the Church as a field hospital where people should come to know God's warmth and closeness to them, where the shepherds have "the smell of the sheep". The last statement went viral and became the title of the book With the Smell of the Sheep: Pope Francis Speaks to Priests, Bishops, and Other Shepherds in which by "warning against the sins of 'self-referentiality', clericalism, careerism, and worldliness, [Francis] stresses the importance of mercy."

The remark of "the smell of the sheep," however, brought a negative critique from the conservative media which asked: "For the 'field hospital' Church, who are the gatekeepers?... a Roman-style pantheon of national conferences of bishops, or maybe only a schismatic and flat 'congregational theocracy' more like Islam? The 'smell of the sheep' is one thing; the smell of wolves in sheep's clothing would be another."

=== Sexual morality ===
Argentinian Archbishop Víctor Fernández has explained controversies that have arisen over Francis' words: "The problem is that the fanatics end up converting some principles into a lifelong battle and deliberately discuss only those issues... There are other issues that are non-negotiable: love your neighbor, do justice to the oppressed..." The Vatican's communications adviser told the Associated Press: "What [Francis] is saying is 'we've spent a lot of time talking about the boundaries. We've spent a lot of time talking about what is sin and what's not. Now let's move on. Let's talk about mercy. Let's talk about love.'" Dublin Archbishop Diarmuid Martin, who is seen by some as Ireland's most reform-minded Catholic leader, said that Francis' comments would be tough for the church to put into action because there has been a tendency to get "trapped" into the right and wrong, white and black, of Catholic teaching.

The scholastic-philosophical approach to morality, stemming largely from Thomas Aquinas, had been used during the papacy of John Paul II to give attention to the "intrinsic evil" of abortion. Francis "finds in the Bible an alternative tradition, touched on in the Second Vatican Council... which takes as its subject 'sins of strength', including the failure to take personal responsibility for the state of the wider world." M. Cathleen Kaveny wrote in America that she believes it is incorrect to apply the term "intrinsic evil" to determine the gravity of an evil, nor should intrinsic evils be so narrowly delimited. In 2013, Massimo Faggioli wrote: "The Catholicism of movement 'to the margins' announced by Pope Francis also means trying to take leave of the political culture of neoconservative and neoliberal Catholicism... a return to a Catholicism that is in search of 'common ground', such as that of the Cardinal of Chicago Joseph Bernardin." This return has been seen as a departure from the neoconservatism among Catholics in the United States that had reigned since the Reagan era, based on an "anti-abortion stance that was isolated from the 'social question'" of market regulation, or other basic rights.

At the same time, while Francis may be seen as a "radical reformer", he also nonetheless believes that "the task of the papacy is the preservation of the doctrine handed down by Jesus Christ." This means preserving the Church's doctrine, as on abortion and artificial contraception, where he hasn't respond to specific misinterpretations of his words but instead uses later opportunities to clarify his orthodoxy. Additionally, Francis pointed out that "Paul VI himself, in the end, urged confessors to be very merciful and pay attention to concrete situations... digging deep and making sure that pastoral care takes into account situations and what it is possible for persons to do."

Francis has criticized those homilies "which should be kerygmatic but end up speaking about everything that has a connection with sex... whether or not to participate in a demonstration against a draft law in favor of the use of condoms." He added: "We end up forgetting the treasure of Jesus alive, the treasure of the Holy Spirit present in our hearts, the treasure of a project of Christian life that has many implications that go much further than mere sexual questions." In his view, the church should not be "obsessed' with gays, abortion and birth control."

We cannot insist only on issues related to abortion, gay marriage, and the use of contraceptive methods... The dogmatic and moral teachings of the church are not all equivalent. The church's pastoral ministry cannot be obsessed with the transmission of a disjointed multitude of doctrines to be imposed insistently. Proclamation in a missionary style focuses on the essentials, on the necessary things: this is also what fascinates and attracts more, what makes the heart burn, as it did for the disciples at Emmaus. We have to find a new balance; otherwise even the moral edifice of the church is likely to fall like a house of cards, losing the freshness and fragrance of the Gospel. The proposal of the Gospel must be more simple, profound, radiant. It is from this proposition that the moral consequences then flow.

This was contrasted with the priorities of Francis' predecessors, John Paul II and Benedict XVI, who saw doctrine as the paramount guide for clergy. Clergy in the United States had already shown dismay that Francis had not emphasized the Church's teaching on abortion, contraception, and homosexuality. Instead, Francis added: "This Church with which we should be thinking is the home of all, not a small chapel that can hold only a small group of selected people. We must not reduce the bosom of the universal Church to a nest protecting our mediocrity."

In naming Francis its "Person of the Year", The Advocate pointed out his "stark change in rhetoric from his two predecessors". It is a well-known fact that the Church's teaching on artificial contraception, in Humanae vitae, has been very poorly received in the living tradition. Francis has spoken freely to reporters on the plane during his travels, and while defending natural family planning, he commented: "Some people think that in order to be good Catholics we have to breed like rabbits, right?"

In the Extraordinary General Assembly of Bishops in 2014, in preparation for the Synod on the Family of 2015, Francis recommended "true spiritual discernment... to give answers to the many discouragements that surround and suffocate families." The survey Francis called for before the synod revealed that in Germany "huge percentages of the people (as many as 97% on some questions) had been ignoring the church's teachings in these areas (related to sexuality, remarriage, birth control...)."

=== Divorce ===
In the 2015 Synod, the question of Communion for divorced Catholics living in a civil marriage grew heated. Francis' successor to the archiepiscopal office in Argentina wrote, of him: "He recommends that we never stop reading the words of St. Ambrose and St. Cyril of Alexandria... which invite us to not be rigid in administration of the Eucharist." As archbishop, Francis had said Mass among the poor of Buenos Aires and "in a shanty town 90 percent of your congregation are single or divorced. You have to learn to deal with that. Communion for the divorced and remarried is not an issue. Everyone takes Communion." "He is always finding traces of God in everyone... especially those we misguidedly judge to be unworthy of sitting at the table of the Lord." Francis has led people "to make room for the marginalized in the life of the local church... to lead by example and to encourage people who are struggling." This is the pope who had the task of writing Amoris laetitia, a summation of the synods on the family.

Francis followed the line of progressives at the synod and suggested that bishops must move church practice closer to the real-life situations, to accompany people in "discernment" and an examination of conscience, "to make room for the consciences of the faithful, who very often respond as best they can to the Gospel amid their limitations, and are capable of carrying out their own discernment in complex situations." He wrote that beyond that, he left the matter to the local bishops' conferences, in the spirit of collegiality that he had been promoting. The bishops in Germany had been debating this issue for over a decade; Francis sided with the majority, which included Cardinal Walter Kasper, against those who were led by Cardinal Gerhard Ludwig Müller. Francis strengthened the hand of those German bishops who, along with Kasper, wrote that "Catholics who have been remarried under civil law after a divorce are invited to go to church, participate in their lives, and mature as living members of the church," offering "no general rule", not insisting that priests give Communion to divorced people but calling for "differentiated solutions, which are appropriate to the individual case." A similar directive had been given by the bishops' conferences in Argentina and in Malta.

A 25-page letter, accusing Francis of spreading heresy through Amoris laetitia, bore 62 signatures from Catholics such as clergy and religious, but Richard Gaillardetz of Boston College stated that all the signatories were "marginal figures". In May 2019, a coalition of conservative Catholic clergy and academics cited Francis for many counts of heresy, among which was allowing divorced Catholics to receive communion. Cardinal Gerhard Müller, dismissed by Francis as the Vatican's doctrinal chief, came out in February 2019 with what the media described as "a clear manifestation of conservative criticism of Francis' emphasis on mercy and accompaniment versus a focus on repeating Catholic morals and doctrine during the previous two papacies."

Thomas J. Reese has defended Francis' changes as consistent with other cases where the understanding of Catholics preceded change in church teaching, citing the cases of usury, heliocentrism, and religious freedom. In July 2020, Cardinal Angelo Scola, who came in second to Francis in the 2013 papal election, also defended Francis' papacy, saying: "Pope Francis seeks to shake up consciences by calling into question consolidated habits and customs in the church, each time raising the bar, so to speak... I truly consider admirable and moving the extraordinary capacity of Pope Francis to make himself close to everyone, and especially to the excluded."

In a book of his own reflections, Francis has written: "Scholars of the law represent the principle opposition to Jesus; they challenge him in the name of doctrine." The fear of losing "the sheep who are already safely inside the pen... (is) the logic of the scholars of the law... The logic of God... welcomes, embraces, and transfigures evil into good... He teaches us what to do, which logic to follow, when faced with people who suffer physically and spiritually."

Pope Francis simplified the process for declaring matrimonial nullity.

=== Liberation theology ===
Just six months into his papacy, Francis invited Gustavo Gutiérrez to meet with him. They had shared a common teacher in Lucio Gera. Gutiérrez, considered to be one of the most outstanding proponents of liberation theology, had attended a conference in Petrópolis in 1964 that is considered to have given birth to liberation theology. At that conference, Gera spoke on "The Meaning of the Christian Message in the Midst of Poverty and Oppression". Gera had also been a teacher of Bergoglio who, as Archbishop of Buenos Aires, showed his esteem for Gera by allowing him to be buried in the crypt of the cathedral. In addition to Gera, the other great exponent of liberation theology has been the priest Rafael Tello. This theologian, from an original reading of Saint Thomas Aquinas, thought about the originality of Latin American popular Christianity and put the center on the option for the poor. Bergoglio highly valued his proposal as he explicitly stated in 2012 when presenting a book on his thinking.

When Francis later became pope, liberation theology could no longer "remain in the shadows to which it has been relegated for some years, at least in Europe," according to the Vatican's semiofficial newspaper, L'Osservatore Romano. Walter Kasper pointed out that, in line with the paradigm shift of Vatican II, Pope Francis' method "is not deductive but rather inductive in that it proceeds from the concrete human situation... The neighbor is for you the exposition of the concrete will of God." This is in accord with the Jesuit practice of "discernment" whereby one begins with the concrete situation, what Vatican II called discerning the "signs of the times" interpreted in the light of the gospel, rather than beginning with church doctrine. Such also is apparent in the method of "see, judge, and act" characteristic of liberation theology and is reflected in the report of the Latin America bishops' conference at Aparecida where Francis had chaired the editorial committee. Francis' later emphasis on collegiality may have received an impetus from Rome's serious changes in the Aparecida document: "the rejection of the significance and competence of the ecclesial authority representing a whole continent and it seemed to negate the teachings of the Second Vatican Council about collegiality."

The conservative–progressive divide among bishops in Latin America has become apparent in the question of how involved the clergy should be in politics. Óscar Romero was appointed bishop in San Salvador as a conservative but moved toward the progressive perspective just 17 days after his consecration as bishop, at the assassination of Father Rutilio Grande. Francis gave his clear support to the progressive perspective by moving forward the causes for canonization of Grande and Romero which had been on hold under the previous pontiffs. He also chose to promote for canonization along with Romero Pope Paul VI, who was described as similar in his care for the poor and for social justice and "an icon of the church that Francis is seeking to build."

The decline of base communities, small communities within a parish, during the papacy of Pope John Paul II has been attributed to his appointment of hundreds of new bishops, some 300 in Brazil alone, "and almost all of those new bishops have been more conservative than their predecessors." Under Pope Francis, however, base communities had been making a comeback with his encouragement and blessing.

=== Application to specific issues ===
Regarding gay people, Francis has reportedly gone beyond the current Catechism and expressed sympathy to LGBT people, stating: "I believe that the church not only should apologize to the person who is gay whom it has offended, but has to apologize to the poor, to exploited women, to children exploited for labor; it has to ask forgiveness for having blessed many weapons."

Francis has also appealed to consumers to reject low-cost goods produced by forced labor or exploitative means and called low-wage labor a form of slavery.

Speaking about those who cannot satisfy their basic needs for food and health care, Francis has called upon all nations to show "a willingness to share everything and to decide to be Good Samaritans, instead of people who are indifferent to the needs of others."

In calling for the abolition of the death penalty and of life imprisonment, Francis criticized attempts to solve society's problems through public punishment rather than through "implementation of another type of social policy, economic policy, and policy of social inclusion."

Francis reduced a sentence for sexual abuse by a priest from imprisonment to instead a lifetime of prayer, as well as a barring from saying Mass or being near children, along with five years of psychotherapy. He said, of the case, "I was new and I didn't understand these things well, and before two choices I chose the more benevolent one... It was the only time I did it, and never again."

== Official papal letters ==
- Evangelii gaudium (The Joy of the Gospel – 2013): an apostolic exhortation issued eight months into his papacy, a "programmatic" for his pontificate
- Laudato si' (Praise Be to You – 2015): an encyclical letter on the environment, "On care for our common home"
- Amoris laetitia (The Joy of Love – 2016): an apostolic exhortation "On love in the family"
- Gaudete et exsultate (Rejoice and Be Glad – 2018): an apostolic exhortation "On the call to holiness in today's world"
- Christus vivit (Christ is Alive – 2018): an apostolic exhortation "To young people and to the whole people of God"
- Fratelli tutti (Brethren all – 2019): an encyclical letter "On fraternity and social friendship"
