= Extraordinary magisterium =

Extraordinary magisterium may refer to:

- A category of officials in the Roman Republic called Magistratus.
- A form of Magisterium in the Catholic Church

== See also ==
- Ordinary magisterium (disambiguation)
