= Ordinary magisterium =

Ordinary magisterium may refer to:

- A category of officials in the Roman Republic called Magistratus.
- A form of Magisterium in the Catholic Church
- Ordinary (church officer)

== See also ==
- Extraordinary magisterium (disambiguation)
