= Obsequium religiosum =

Duty of the faithful in Catholicism

Obsequium religiosum is a Latin phrase meaning religious submission, religious assent, or religious respect; it is used particularly in the theology of the Catholic Church.

== Second Vatican Council ==
The Latin term is used in the Latin original document Lumen gentium of the Second Vatican Council regarding the duty of the faithful to give obsequium religiosum (Latin for "religious submission") of will and intellect to certain teachings of the Magisterium of the Church. The Magisterium is a reference to the authoritative teaching body of the Roman Catholic Church.

The phrase appears in Lumen gentium 25a in the following context, here translated as both "religious assent" and "religious submission":

Bishops, teaching in communion with the Roman Pontiff, are to be respected by all as witnesses to divine and Catholic truth. In matters of faith and morals, the bishops speak in the name of Christ and the faithful are to accept their teaching and adhere to it with a religious assent. This religious submission of mind and will must be shown in a special way to the authentic magisterium of the Roman Pontiff, even when he is not speaking ex cathedra; that is, it must be shown in such a way that his supreme magisterium is acknowledged with reverence, the judgments made by him are sincerely adhered to, according to his manifest mind and will. His mind and will in the matter may be known either from the character of the documents, from his frequent repetition of the same doctrine, or from his manner of speaking.

The magisterial teachings of the Catholic Church can be graded in two ways, according to the nature of their content, and according to the degree of authority with which they are proposed. The two ways of grading doctrines are connected, but distinct. In the former grading, one talks about a "hierarchy of truths," where the higher truths are those most central to the gospel. In the latter grading, the higher the level of authority with which they are proposed, the greater the assent of the will to that truth must be. The document Donum Veritatis teaches the following concerning this gradation of assent:

When the Magisterium of the Church makes an infallible pronouncement and solemnly declares that a teaching is found in Revelation, the assent called for is that of theological faith. This kind of adherence is to be given even to the teaching of the ordinary and universal Magisterium when it proposes for belief a teaching of faith as divinely revealed.

When the Magisterium proposes "in a definitive way" truths concerning faith and morals, which, even if not divinely revealed, are nevertheless strictly and intimately connected with Revelation, these must be firmly accepted and held.

When the Magisterium, not intending to act "definitively", teaches a doctrine to aid a better understanding of Revelation and make explicit its contents, or to recall how some teaching is in conformity with the truths of faith, or finally to guard against ideas that are incompatible with these truths, the response called for is that of the religious submission of will and intellect. This kind of response cannot be simply exterior or disciplinary but must be understood within the logic of faith and under the impulse of obedience to the faith.

In its next section, Donum Veritatis states that "some judgments of the Magisterium could be justified at the time in which they were made, ... (but) only time has permitted discernment and, after deeper study, the attainment of true doctrinal progress".

The document, ″Doctrinal Commentary on the Concluding Formula of the Professio fidei″ (scroll down to find document), gives a detailed description of these three "categories" of truths and gives examples of each.

== Withholding assent ==
Donum Veritatis also allows that, "When it comes to the question of interventions in the prudential order, it could happen that some Magisterial documents might not be free from all deficiencies." However “it would be contrary to the truth, if, proceeding from some particular cases, one were to conclude that the Church's Magisterium can be habitually mistaken in its prudential judgments.”

It acknowledges that a given theologian, "might have serious difficulties, for reasons which appear to him wellfounded, in accepting a non-irreformable magisterial teaching." In such a case "even if the doctrine of the faith is not in question, the theologian will not present his own opinions or divergent hypotheses as though they were non-arguable conclusions," and is to "refrain from giving untimely public expression to them," and "avoid turning to the mass media," but with a humble and teachable spirit it is his duty "to make known to the Magisterial authorities the problems raised by the teaching in itself, in the arguments proposed to justify it, or even in the manner in which it is presented," with "an intense and patient reflection on his part and a readiness, if need be, to revise his own opinions and examine the objections which his colleagues might offer him", prayerfully trusting "that if the truth really is at stake, it will ultimately prevail."

In so doing it makes a distinction between dissent as in public opposition to the Magisterium of the Church and the situation of conscientious personal difficulties with teaching, and asserts that the Church "has always held that nobody is to be forced to embrace the faith against his will," while the Virgin Mary's "immediate and unhesitating assent of faith to the Word of God" is set forth as the example to follow in submitting to Catholic teaching.

While the theologian, like every believer, must follow his conscience, and Joseph Ratzinger (as a priest-theologian) taught that "over the pope as the expression of the binding claim of ecclesiastical authority there still stands one's own conscience, which must be obeyed before all else," it is not "an autonomous and exclusive authority for deciding the truth of a doctrine," and the Catholic is obliged to form it according to Catholic teaching.

== See also ==
- Orthodoxy
- Roman Catholic dogma
