= Gaudete et exsultate =

2018 apostolic exhortation by Pope Francis

Gaudete et exsultate Latin for 'Rejoice and Be Glad' Apostolic exhortation of Pope Francis
- Signature date: 19 March 2018
- Subject: On the call to holiness in today's world
- Pages: 44
- Number: 3 of 7 of the pontificate
- Text: In Latin; In English

Gaudete et exsultate (Rejoice and Be Glad) is the third apostolic exhortation of Pope Francis, dated 19 March 2018 (the Solemnity of Saint Joseph) and published on 9 April 2018, subtitled "on the call to holiness in today's world". It addresses the universal call to holiness, with a focus "to repropose the call to holiness in a practical way for our own time".

== Background ==
A few weeks before the apostolic exhortation's publication, the Congregation for the Doctrine of the Faith released a letter to Catholic bishops, titled Placuit Deo (It pleased God), "on certain aspects of Christian salvation", which anticipated a central theme of Gaudete et exsultate, describing the modern forms of Pelagianism and of Gnosticism. Francis sees these two ancient heresies in the current notion of holiness based on following certain abstract rules, "an obsession with the law, ... a punctilious concern for the Church’s liturgy", while ignoring the messiness of real life and the suffering of people at the margins. If the Church does not open itself to change, it can become a "museum piece" out of touch with a lively charity which is the foundation of the Christian life: "Once we believe that everything depends on human effort as channeled by ecclesial rules and structures, we unconsciously complicate the Gospel and become enslaved to a blueprint that leaves few openings for the working of grace."

== Publication ==
The document was released by the Holy See Press Office at a press conference on 9 April 2018, the Solemnity of the Annunciation, presented by then-Archbishop Angelo De Donatis, the vicar general for Rome, Gianni Valente, a journalist and Paola Bignardi, of Azione Cattolica (Catholic Action). It was also published in Arabic, in French, in German, in Italian, in Polish, in Portuguese and in Spanish, alongside English.

== Content ==
The document is arranged in five chapters: on the universal call to perfection of charity; on the heresies of Gnosticism and Pelagianism, described as "false forms of holiness"; on the Beatitudes as "worship most acceptable to God"; on five signs of holiness in the modern world (perseverance, patience, meekness, joy and a sense of humor, boldness and passionate commitment), and on life as constant spiritual combat against evil through the discernment of spirits.

Gaudete et exsultate follows Francis's previous apostolic exhortations, Evangelii gaudium and Amoris laetitia. It is shorter, being 44 pages in length, compared to the 256 of Amoris laetitia, and not post-synodal (being related to a meeting of the Synod of Bishops).
