= Sign of the times (Catholic Church) =

Spiritual doctrine

Signs of the times is a phrase strongly associated with the Catholic Church in the era of the Second Vatican Council of the 1960s. It was taken to mean that the church should listen to, and learn from, the world around it. In other words, it should learn to read the 'signs of the times'. This phrase comes from Matthew 16:3, Luke 12:56 and was used by Pope John XXIII [Latin: "signa temporum"] when he convoked the council, in the statement Humanae Salutis (1961) and also in Pacem in Terris (1963). It came to signify a new understanding that the Church needed to attend more closely to the world if it was to remain faithful to its calling, and marked a significant shift in theological method. The phrase "sign of the times" was used four times in the Vatican II documents:

- Unitatis redintegratio §4
- Dignitatis humanae §15
- Presbyterorum ordinis §9 (including invitation to cooperate with laity in recognizing the signs of the times)
- Gaudium et spes §4

The phrase has continued to be used in papal encyclicals and the Catechism of the Catholic Church since then.

== See also ==
- Humanae vitae
