= Evangelii gaudium =

2013 apostolic exhortation by Pope Francis

Evangelii Gaudium Latin for 'The Joy of the Gospel' Apostolic exhortation of Pope Francis
- Signature date: 24 November 2013
- Subject: On the proclamation of the Gospel in today's world
- Pages: 217
- Number: 1 of 7 of the pontificate
- Original language: Italian
- Text: In English
- AAS: 105 (12): 1019-1137

Evangelii Gaudium (The Joy of the Gospel) is a 2013 apostolic exhortation by Pope Francis "On the proclamation of the Gospel in today's world". In its opening paragraph, Pope Francis urged the entire Church "to embark on a new chapter of evangelism". According to the exhortation, the Church must understand itself as a community of missionary disciples, who are "permanently in a state of mission".

Evangelii Gaudium touches on many of the themes of Francis' papacy, including obligations Christians have to the poor and the duty to establish and maintain just economic, political, and legal orders. Refocusing society's priorities, he asks how "it is not a news item when an elderly homeless person dies of exposure, but it is news when the stock market loses two points?" It has been described by Italian theologian Massimo Faggioli as "the manifesto of Francis" and a "Magna Carta for church reform".

Evangelii Gaudium is directed "at overcoming complacency at every level of the church’s hierarchy and in the life of every Christian". Calling for an "ecclesial renewal which cannot be deferred", Francis is critical of the over-centralization of church bureaucracy, unthinking preaching, and excessive emphasis on doctrine. Throughout the exhortation he calls for more pastoral creativity and openness, insisting that the entire Church realize "a missionary impulse capable of transforming everything", and adds that "the path of a pastoral and missionary conversion which cannot leave things as they presently are." In regard to what he perceives is a current negative dependence on over-centralization in the Church's structure as opposed to an open and missionary spirit flowing through every level, he writes, "I too must think about a conversion of the papacy. ... The papacy and the central structures of the universal Church also need to hear the call to pastoral conversion."

In contrast to the writing style of previous popes, Evangelii Gaudium is not written in an academic style but "in language that is both easily understood and captivating". In the 47,560 word document, Francis uses the word "love" 154 times, "joy" 109 times, "the poor" 91 times, "peace" 58 times, "justice" 37 times, and "common good" 15 times.

== Development ==
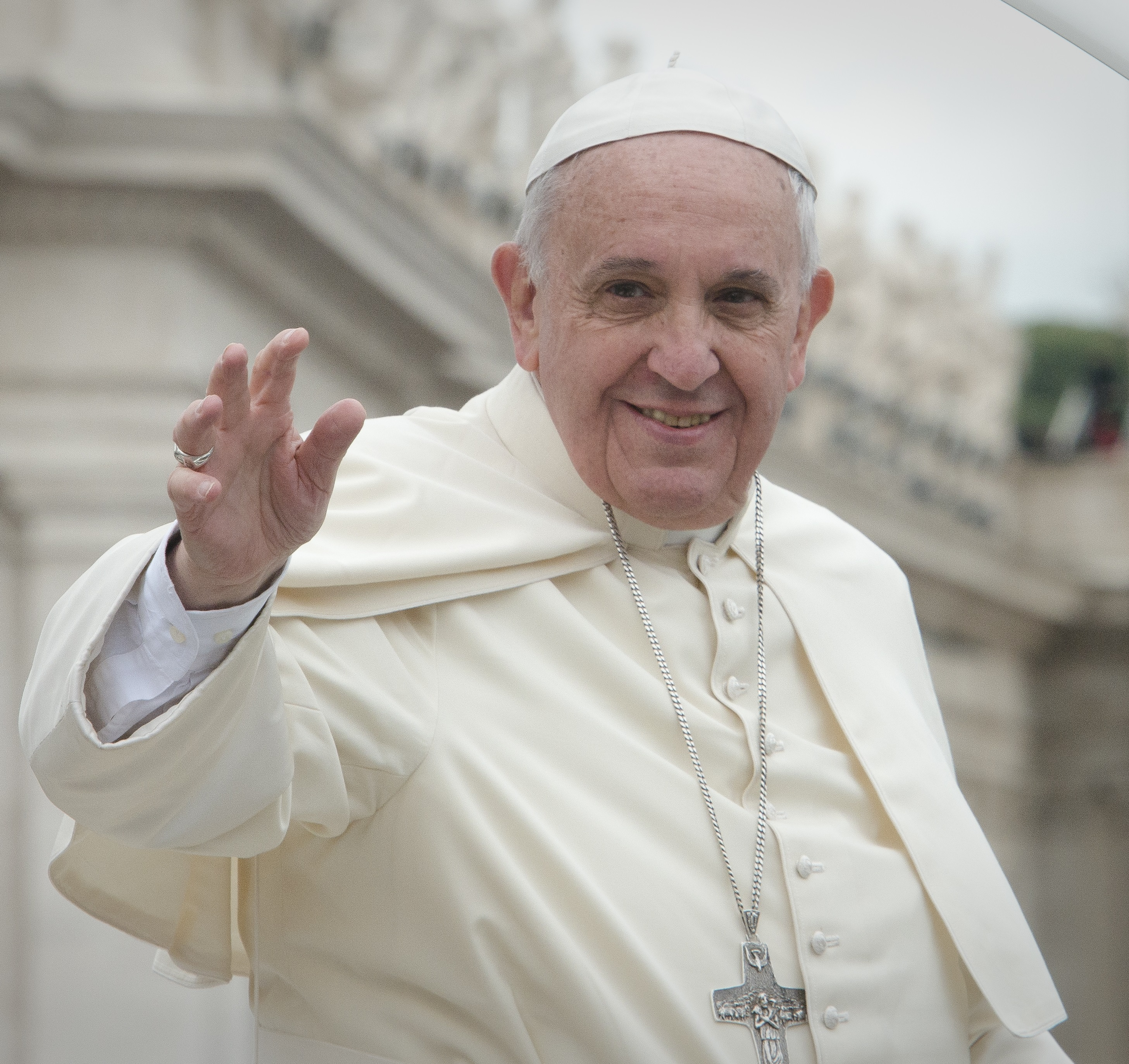
Pope Francis, 2014

Everything mentioned in Evangelii Gaudium was brought up by Pope Francis during the first year of his pontificate, sometimes almost to the letter and other times implicitly. The document follows a Synod of Bishops held during 7–28 October 2012 on the theme of the New Evangelization. Issued on the Feast of Christ the King, it brought to a conclusion the Year of Faith declared by Pope Benedict XVI which commenced on 11 October 2012.

Archbishop Víctor Manuel Fernández helped draft the document. The text is deeply Christological: "An evangelizing community knows that the Lord has taken the initiative, he has loved us first, and therefore we can move forward, boldly take the initiative, go out to others, seek those who have fallen away, stand at the crossroads and welcome the outcast" (EG 24).

=== Influences ===
Most of the exhortation is Francis' own personal insight. His text cites several sources. In May 2007, at the Fifth Episcopal Conference of Latin America in Aparecida, Brazil, Cardinal Jorge Bergoglio, later Pope Francis was elected by his brother bishops to chair the important committee charged with drafting the final document. The Aparecida document includes themes concerning evangelism, care for the poor and more that are also found in Evangelii Gaudium.

The main source is the Propositions of the synodal fathers of the XIII assembly of the Synod of Bishops, cited 27 times. Among Church Fathers, Francis cites Irenaeus of Lyon, Ambrose of Milan and Augustine of Hippo. Among medieval teachers he cites Isaac of Stella, Thomas Kempis, and Saint Thomas Aquinas. Modern authors cited by the Pope include John Henry Newman, Henri de Lubac, Romano Guardini and Georges Bernanos.

== Content ==
=== Introduction ===
In the first chapters the Pope cites several Bible passages that show the relationship between the joy of receiving the Christian faith and the joy of missionary activity. Francis then offers several themes for the exhortation of the reform of the Church in her missionary outreach; the temptations faced by pastoral workers; the Church, understood as the entire People of God which evangelizes; the homily and its preparation; the inclusion of the poor in society; peace and dialogue within society; the spiritual motivations for mission.

=== Chapter I: The Church's Missionary Transformation (19–49) ===
In this chapter Francis underlines the importance of the parish, which "can assume quite different contours depending on the openness and missionary creativity of the pastor and community", and asks oratories, ecclesiastical movements, prelatures, and other communities in the Church to join the activities of the local parish. He shows the responsibility that bishops have for the missionary activities in their own diocese.

More than by fear of going astray, my hope is that we will be moved by the fear of remaining shut up within structures which give us a false sense of security, within rules which make us harsh judges, within habits which make us feel safe, while at our door people are starving and Jesus does not tire of saying to us: "Give them something to eat" (Mk 6:37). (EG #49)

The Pope says, "Since I am called to put into practice what I ask of others, I too must think about a conversion of the papacy".

=== Chapter II: Amid the Crisis of Communal Commitment (50–109) ===
The chapter is divided in two sections: the first one, Some challenges of today’s world, deals with economic matters, poverty, and modern culture. It also mentions the new religious movements and moral relativism. The second section, Temptations faced by pastoral workers, describes two errors commonly faced by Christians: first the "attraction of Gnosticism" that offers "a faith whose only interest is a certain experience or a set of ideas and bits of information"; the second is "the self-absorbed promethean neopelagianism" of those who "feel superior to others because they observe certain rules or remain intransigently faithful to a particular Catholic style from the past" with "a narcissistic and authoritarian elitism". He cautions against "an ostentatious preoccupation for the liturgy".

=== Chapter III: The Proclamation of the Gospel (110–175) ===
Francis describes thoroughly the importance of the homily, which "should be brief and avoid taking on the semblance of a speech or a lecture", and should be prepared with care: "Preparation for preaching is so important a task that a prolonged time of study, prayer, reflection and pastoral creativity should be devoted to it ... A preacher who does not prepare is not 'spiritual'; he is dishonest and irresponsible with the gifts he has received". One of the central themes of the apostolic exhortation is that evangelisation is the duty of the whole people of God, including laity. In this it follows on and complements Pope John Paul II's 1988 apostolic exhortation Christifideles Laici in promoting the vocation and mission of the laity.

=== Chapter IV: The Social Dimension of Evangelization (176–258) ===
The fourth chapter deals with many topics: care for the weakest persons ("the homeless, the addicted, refugees, indigenous peoples, the elderly who are increasingly isolated and abandoned, and many others"), long term politics, human relationships with creation, and social dialogue: the dialogue between faith and reason, ecumenical dialogue, and inter-religious dialogue. The Gospel and a commitment to justice, development and peace are inextricably connected. Francis' observation that "we can feel the desertification of the soil almost as a physical ailment, and the extinction of a species as a painful disfigurement", is reiterated in his later encyclical letter Laudato si'.

In paragraph 247, Francis affirms that "As Christians, we cannot consider Judaism as a foreign religion; nor do we include the Jews among those called to turn from idols and to serve the true God (cf. 1 Thes 1:9). With them, we believe in the one God who acts in history, and with them we accept his revealed word." In paragraph 249 he writes, "While it is true that certain Christian beliefs are unacceptable to Judaism, and that the Church cannot refrain from proclaiming Jesus as Lord and Messiah, there exists as well a rich complementarity which allows us to read the texts of the Hebrew Scriptures together and to help one another to mine the riches of God’s word. We can also share many ethical convictions and a common concern for justice and the development of peoples". In paragraph 254, he teaches that non-Christian rituals of any religion can have a divine origin, that they are "a communitarian experience of journeying towards God" and can be "channels which the Holy Spirit raises up in order to liberate non-Christians from atheistic immanentism or from purely individual religious experiences".

=== Chapter V: Spirit-filled Evangelizers (259–288) ===
The last part of the exhortation deals with the personal relationship with Christ and the imitation of the Virgin Mary as an icon of joy and missionary activity.

== Gift to heads of States ==
On 10 May 2015, Raúl Castro met Pope Francis at the Vatican and was presented a copy. When Donald Trump visited Vatican City on 25 May 2017, Pope Francis presented to him copies of Evangelii Gaudium and Laudato Si.

== Response ==
Adam Rasmussen, an openly "pro-Francis partisan" at Georgetown University, favors Evangelii Gaudium, wherein "Francis already spoke positively of religious pluralism", over the Document on Human Fraternity. He argues: "Despite the commotion this document has made, what it says about religions is actually less noteworthy than what is in Evangelii Gaudium. I don't think many people noticed section 254 when it came out because they were too busy arguing about other sections of EG!"

That Francis "takes up and even advances Vatican II's teachings on other religions", in what was "his first official document", did not fail to be noticed. Pat Perriello, associate professor at Johns Hopkins University, calls the document "truly remarkable", representing "a bold new vision for the church". Francis' call for pastoral dialogue in Evangelii Gaudium, which he "amplified in his 2019 apostolic exhortation on young people, Christus Vivit, inspired the synodal approach of the National Dialogue", which began at the USCCB Convocation of Catholic Leaders in 2017. This lasted from 2018 to 2019, and its final report was released in 2021.

== In music ==
On behalf of the Diocese of Limburg, Peter Reulein wrote the music for the oratorio, fully titled Laudato si': A Franciscan Magnificat, to the libretto by Helmut Schlegel of the Orders of Friars Minor. This work is based on the Latin version of the Magnificat, corresponds to the Extraordinary Jubilee of Mercy, and includes texts from the apostolic exhortation Evangelii Gaudium and the encyclical Laudato si'. The premiere of the oratorio took place in the Limburg Cathedral on 6 November 2016.
