= Richard Gaillardetz =

American theologian (1958–2023)

Richard R. Gaillardetz (1958 – November 7, 2023) was an American theologian specializing in questions relating to ecclesiology and the structures of authority in the Catholic Church.

== Biography ==
Born in a Texas military family, he earned his BA in humanities in 1981 from the University of Texas and an MA in biblical theology at St. Mary's University in San Antonio, Texas in 1984. He also received an MA and a PhD in systematic theology from the University of Notre Dame. For his dissertation he researched ‘the Theology of the Ordinary Universal Magisterium of Bishops’.

From 1991 to 2001, he taught at the University of St. Thomas Graduate School of Theology in Houston, Texas. From 2001 to 2011, Gaillardetz held the Thomas and Margaret Murray and James J. Bacik Chair in Catholic Studies at the University of Toledo. He served on the board of directors of the Catholic Theological Society of America and on the United Methodist-Catholic Dialogue. In 2011, Gaillardetz left the University of Toledo to accept the Joseph Chair of Catholic Systematic Theology at Boston College.

He is the author or editor of fourteen books, the last of which was While I Breathe, I Hope: A Mystagogy of Dying (Liturgical Press, 2024).

Gaillardetz died at home on November 7, 2023, of pancreatic cancer.

== Books ==
- Go Into the Streets! The Welcoming Church of Pope Francis
- An Unfinished Council
- A Church with Open Doors
- The Church in the Making
- Ecclesiology for a Global Church
- A Daring Promise: A Spirituality of Christian Marriage
- By What Authority?
- Readings in Church Authority
- Teaching with Authority
- Transforming Our Days
- Witnesses to the Faith
- Keys to the Council
- When the Magisterium Intervenes
- While I Breathe, I Hope: A Mystagogy of Dying
