= Magisterium =

Doctrinal authority of the Catholic Church

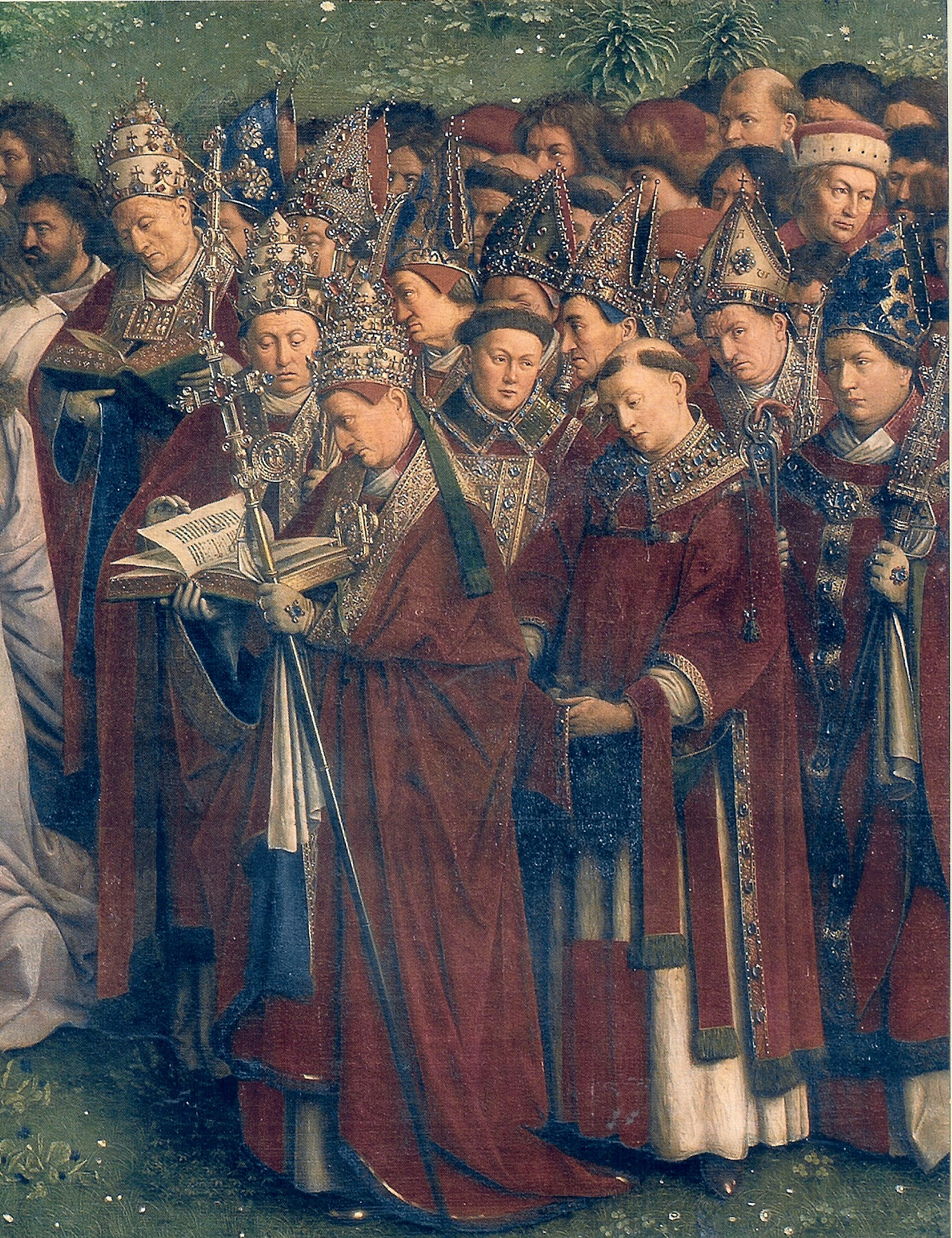
A part of the Ghent Altarpiece showing three popes (Martin V, Gregory VII and Antipope Alexander V) and other bishops

The magisterium of the Catholic Church is the church's authority or office to give authentic interpretation of the word of God, "whether in its written form or in the form of Tradition". According to the 1992 Catechism of the Catholic Church, the task of interpretation is vested uniquely in the Pope and the bishops, though the concept has a complex history of development. Scripture and Tradition "make up a single sacred deposit of the Word of God, which is entrusted to the Church", and the magisterium is not independent of this, since "all that it proposes for belief as being divinely revealed is derived from this single deposit of faith."

== Solemn and ordinary ==
The exercise of the Catholic Church's magisterium is sometimes, but only rarely, expressed in the solemn form of an ex cathedra papal declaration, "when, in the exercise of his office as shepherd and teacher of all Christians, in virtue of his supreme apostolic authority, [the Bishop of Rome] defines a doctrine concerning faith or morals to be held by the whole Church," or of a similar declaration by an ecumenical council. Such solemn declarations of the church's teaching invoke the infallibility of the Church.

Pope Pius IX's definition of the Immaculate Conception of Mary and Pope Pius XII's definition of the Assumption of Mary are examples of such solemn papal pronouncements. Most dogmas have been promulgated at ecumenical councils. Examples of solemn declarations by ecumenical councils are the Council of Trent's decree on justification and the First Vatican Council's definition of papal infallibility.

The Catholic Church's magisterium is exercised without this solemnity in statements by popes and bishops, whether collectively (as by an episcopal conference) or singly, in written documents such as catechisms, encyclicals, and pastoral letters, or orally, as in homilies. These statements are part of the ordinary magisterium of the church.

The First Vatican Council declared that "all those things are to be believed with divine and Catholic faith which are contained in the Word of God, written or handed down, and which the Church, either by a solemn judgment or by her ordinary and universal teaching magisterium, proposes for belief as having been divinely revealed."

The Second Vatican Council declared further that not everything contained in the statements of the ordinary magisterium is infallible, but the Catholic Church holds that the Church's infallibility is invested in the statements of its universal ordinary magisterium: "Although the bishops, taken individually, do not enjoy the privilege of infallibility, they do, however, proclaim infallibly the doctrine of Christ on the following conditions: namely, when, even though dispersed throughout the world but preserving for all that amongst themselves and with Peter's successor the bond of communion, in their authoritative teaching concerning matters of faith or morals, they are in agreement that a particular teaching is to be held definitively and absolutely."

Such teachings of the ordinary and universal magisterium are obviously not given in a single specific document. They are teachings upheld as authoritative, generally for a long time, by the entire body of bishops. Examples given are the teaching on the reservation of ordination to males and on the immorality of procured abortion.

Even public statements by popes or bishops on questions of faith or morals that do not qualify as "ordinary and universal magisterium" have an authority that Catholics are not free to merely dismiss. They are required to give that teaching religious submission:

Bishops, teaching in communion with the Roman Pontiff, are to be respected by all as witnesses to divine and Catholic truth. In matters of faith and morals, the bishops speak in the name of Christ and the faithful are to accept their teaching and adhere to it with a religious assent. This religious submission of mind and will must be shown in a special way to the authentic magisterium of the Roman Pontiff, even when he is not speaking ex cathedra; that is, it must be shown in such a way that his supreme magisterium is acknowledged with reverence, the judgments made by him are sincerely adhered to, according to his manifest mind and will. His mind and will in the matter may be known either from the character of the documents, from his frequent repetition of the same doctrine, or from his manner of speaking.

— Second Vatican Council, Dogmatic Constitution on the Church Lumen gentium, 25

== Etymology ==
The word "magisterium" is derived from Latin magister, which means "teacher" in ecclesiastical Latin. (It originally had a more general meaning, and could designate president, chief, director, superintendent, etc., and was only rarely a tutor or instructor of youth.) The noun magisterium refers to the office of a magister. Thus the relationship between magister and magisterium is the same as the relationship in English between "president" and "presidency".

Since the time of Pope Pius XII, the word "magisterium" has also been used to refer to the persons who hold this office.

== Source and criteria ==
The Catholic Church teaches that Jesus Christ is the source of divine revelation. The Catholic Church bases all of its teachings on sacred tradition and sacred scripture. The Magisterium consists in all the infallible teachings of the Church, "Wherefore, by divine and Catholic faith all those things are to be believed which are contained in the word of God as found in Scripture and tradition, and which are proposed by the Church as matters to be believed as divinely revealed, whether by her solemn judgment or in her ordinary and universal Magisterium." (First Vatican Council, Dei Filius, 8.) However, the criteria for the infallibility of "solemn judgment" and "ordinary and universal Magisterium" are different. The sacred magisterium consists of both the extraordinary and dogmatic decrees of the Pope and ecumenical councils, and the Ordinary and Universal Magisterium consists primarily of Papal documents addressed to all the Catholic faithful, such as Rerum novarum.

The Second Vatican Council states, "For this reason Jesus perfected revelation by fulfilling it through His whole work of making Himself present and manifesting Himself: through His words and deeds, His signs and wonders, but especially through His death and glorious resurrection from the dead and final sending of the Spirit of truth." (Dei verbum, 4). The content of Christ's divine revelation, as faithfully passed on by the Apostles, is called the Deposit of Faith, and consists of both Sacred Scripture and Sacred Tradition.

The infallible teachings of the ecumenical councils consist of the solemn dogmatic, theological or moral definitions as contained in declarations, decrees, doctrines and condemnations (traditionally expressed in conciliar canons and decrees) of councils consisting of the pope and the bishops from all over the world. Reasons for a belief in a particular dogma are not infallible but only the dogma itself.

A teaching of ordinary and universal magisterium is a teaching by the Pope or bishops which is binding on one's intellect and will to whom these are addressed. Ordinary magisterial documents are more binding when they speak about the subjects they intend to and the same document may have many statements that are not authoritative. Such a teaching must also be a part of the sensus fidelium.

== Levels ==
Only the Pope and bishops in communion with him exercise the office of magisterium; theologians and schismatic bishops do not.

Teacher:	Level of magisterium:	Degree of certitude:	Assent required:	Applies to:
1. Pope ex cathedra	Extraordinary and universal teaching of the Church	Infallible on matters of faith and morals	Full assent of faith	Whole Church; all Catholics
2. Ecumenical council (compare 5 below)	Extraordinary and universal teaching of the Church	Infallible on matters of faith and morals	Full assent of faith	Whole Church; all Catholics
3. Bishops, together with the Pope, dispersed but in agreement, proposing definitively (ie, the College of Bishops, its membership collectively)	Ordinary and universal teaching of the Church	Infallible on matters of faith and morals	Full assent of faith	Whole Church; all Catholics
4. Pope, encyclical, apostolic constitution	Ordinary teaching of the Church	Authoritative but not irreformable	Papal magisterium to be treated with special reverence via religious submission of intellect and will	To whom the papal documents are addressed
5. A bishop individually, or a bishop joined up in a conference of bishops (eg, a national, or regionally delimited), or a particular council of bishops	Ordinary teaching of the Church	Authoritative but non-infallible	Religious submission of mind, intellect, and will	Catholics entrusted to the care of (in the Diocese of) the relevant bishop(s)

== Historical development ==
=== Early Church ===
==== Bishops as authority ====
The most basic foundation of the magisterium, the apostolic succession of bishops and their authority as protectors of the faith, was one of the few points that was rarely debated by the Church Fathers. The doctrine was elaborated by Ignatius of Antioch (and others) in the face of Gnosticism, expounded by others such as Irenaeus, Tertullian, Cyprian, Ambrose, and Augustine, and by the end of the 2nd century AD was universally accepted by the bishops.

Some of the first problems began to arise, however, with the increasing worldliness of the clergy. Criticism arose against the bishops, and an attempt was made to have all bishops drawn from the ranks of monastic communities, whose men were seen as the holiest possible leaders. However, there had also developed in the Church a Roman sense of government, which insisted upon order at any cost, and this led to the phenomenon of the "imperial bishops", men who had to be obeyed by virtue of their position, regardless of their personal holiness, and the distinction between "man" and "office".

==== Early disagreements ====
This understanding was not universally accepted. According to Robert B. Eno, Origen was one of the most famous critics of the episcopal corruption. He says that throughout Origen's life, many of his writings were considered to be questionably orthodox, and he seemed to espouse the idea of a teaching authority based on theological expertise alone rather than, or at least along with, apostolic succession.

Another early disagreement in the Church surrounding the issue of authority manifested itself in Montanism, which began as a movement promoting the charism of prophecy. Montanism claimed, among other things, that prophecies like those found in the Old Testament were continuing in the Church, and that new prophecies had the same authority as apostolic teaching. The Church, however, ruled that these new prophecies were not authoritative, and condemned Montanism as a heresy. Other times, private revelations were recognized by the Church, but the Church continues to teach that private revelations are altogether separate from the deposit of faith, and that they are not required to be believed by all Catholics.

=== Era of the ecumenical councils ===
The first seven ecumenical councils, presided over by the emperor with representatives from all important metropolitan sees including Jerusalem, Constantinople, and Rome among others, exercised an important authority to define doctrine seen as essential to most contemporary Christians, including that as to the divinity of Christ and the two natures of Christ. These councils also produced various creeds, including the Nicene Creed. The official language of these councils, including all authoritative texts produced, was Greek. The relation between the councils and patriarchal authority was complex. For example, the sixth council, the Third Council of Constantinople in 680-81, condemned both monoenergism and monothelitism and included those who had supported this heresy, including Pope Honorius I and four previous patriarchs of Constantinople.

=== Medieval period ===
Perceptions of teaching authority in the Middle Ages are hard to characterize because they were so varied. While there arose a keener understanding and acceptance of papal primacy (at least after the Great Schism), there was also an increased emphasis placed on the theologian, and there were numerous dissenters from both views.

==== Era of Charlemagne ====
As part of the flourishing of culture and renewal under his reign, the Emperor Charlemagne commissioned one of the first major church-wide studies of the patristic era. This "golden age" or Carolingian Renaissance greatly influenced the identity of the Church. New texts were being discovered and disseminated at rapid pace in the late 700s and early 800s and patristic authorship became important for establishing a text's authority in Catholic theology. Unfortunately also at this time, a series of power struggles emerged between diocesan bishops and their metropolitans. As part of this struggle, a series of elaborate forgeries were produced, the counterfeiters seeking to take advantage of the cultural renaissance of the time and eagerness to discover 'new texts'. The Pseudo-Isidorian Decretals asserted Roman papal power to depose and appoint bishops for the first time by deriving this power from forgeries of texts purporting to be from the fathers of the early church, interlaced with texts already known to be legitimate. These decretals had an enormous influence on concentrating the teaching authority and power of the pope; but they were not uncovered as forgeries until the 1500s, and nor were they universally acknowledged to be forgeries until the 1800s.

==== Theologians, Masters, Experts ====
Many concepts of teaching authority gained prominence in the Middle Ages, including the concept of the authority of the learned expert, an idea which began with Origen (or even earlier) and still today has proponents. Some allowed for the participation of theologians in the teaching life of the church, but still drew distinctions between the powers of the theologian and bishops; one example of this view is in the writing of St. Thomas Aquinas, who spoke of the "Magisterium cathedrae pastoralis" (of the pastoral chair) and the "Magisterium cathedrae magistralis" (Magisterium of a master's chair). The highest order of the Magisterium cathedrae pastoralis mentioned is the episcopacy itself, and at the top the pope: "Magis est standum sententiae Papae, ad quem pertinet determinare de fide, quam in iudicio profert, quam quorumlibet sapientum hominum in Scripturis opinioni." Others held more extreme views, such as Godefroid of Fontaines, who insisted that the theologian had a right to maintain his own opinions in the face of episcopal and even papal rulings.

Until the formation of the Roman Inquisition in the 16th century, the central authority to discover the norm for Catholic truth—by means of the study and commentary on scripture and tradition—was universally seen as being the role of the theology faculties of universities. The Paris faculty of theology at the Sorbonne rose in prominence to be the most important in the Christian world. A common act of kings, bishops, and popes, in matters of church or state with regard to religion, was to poll the universities (especially the Sorbonne) on theological questions so as to obtain opinions from the masters before making their own judgment. In the Catholic Church today, this custom is still observed (at least pro forma or to some extent) in the retention of an official Theologian of the Pontifical Household, who often advises the pope on matters of controversy.

==== Papal primacy and teaching authority ====
Throughout the Middle Ages, support for the primacy of the pope (spiritually and temporally) and his ability to speak authoritatively on matters of doctrine grew significantly as the Decretals of Isadore became widely accepted. Two popes, Innocent III (1198–1216) and Boniface VIII (1294–1303), were especially influential in advancing the power of the papacy. Innocent asserted that the pope's power was a right bestowed by God, and developed the idea of the pope not only as a teacher and spiritual leader but also a secular ruler. Boniface, in the papal bull Unam Sanctam, asserted that the spiritual world, headed on earth by the pope, has authority over the temporal world, and that all must submit themselves to the authority of the pope to be saved.

==== Papal infallibility ====
In the Decretum of Gratian, a 12th-century canon lawyer, the pope is attributed the legal right to pass judgment in theological disputes, but he was certainly not guaranteed freedom from error. The pope's role was to establish limits within which theologians, who were often better suited for the full expression of truth, could work. Thus, the pope's authority was as a judge, not as an infallible teacher.

The doctrine began to visibly develop during the Reformation, leading to a formal statement of the doctrine by St. Robert Bellarmine in the early 17th century, but it did not come into widespread acceptance until the 19th century and the First Vatican Council.

==== Council of Constance (1414–1418) ====
A significant development in the teaching authority of the Church occurred from 1414 to 1418 with the Council of Constance, which effectively ran the Church during the Great Schism, during which there were three men claiming to be the pope. An early decree of this council, Haec Sancta, challenged the primacy of the pope, saying that councils represent the church, are imbued with their power directly by Christ, and are binding even for the pope in matters of faith. This declaration was later declared void by the Church because the early sessions of the council had not been confirmed by a pope, but it demonstrates that there were still conciliar currents in the church running against the doctrine of papal primacy, likely influenced by the corruption seen in the papacy during this time period.

==== Council of Basle (1439) ====
The theologian continued to play a more prominent role in the teaching life of the church, as "doctors" were called upon more and more to help bishops form doctrinal opinions. Illustrating this, at the Council of Basle in 1439, bishops and other clergy were greatly outnumbered by doctors of theology.

Despite this growth in influence, popes still asserted their power to crack down on those perceived as "rogue" theologians, through councils (for example, in the cases of Peter Abelard and Beranger) and commissions (as with Nicolas of Autrecourt, Ockham, and Eckhart). With the coming of the Reformation in 1517, this assertion of papal power came to a head and the primacy and authority of the papacy over theologians was vigorously re-established. However, the Council of Trent re-introduced the collaboration between theologians and council Fathers, and the next centuries leading up to the First and Second Vatican Councils were generally accepting of a broader role for the learned in the Church, although the popes still kept a close eye on theologians and intervened occasionally.

==== Late medieval period ====
In the late medieval period, statements of this papal power were common in the works of theologians as well. For example, Domingo Bañez attributed to the Pope the "definitive power to declare the truths of the faith," and Thomas Cajetan, in expanding the distinction made by St. Thomas Aquinas, drew a line between personal faith manifested in theologians and the authoritative faith presented as a matter of judgment by the pope.

=== Vatican councils and their Popes ===
==== Pius IX and Vatican I ====
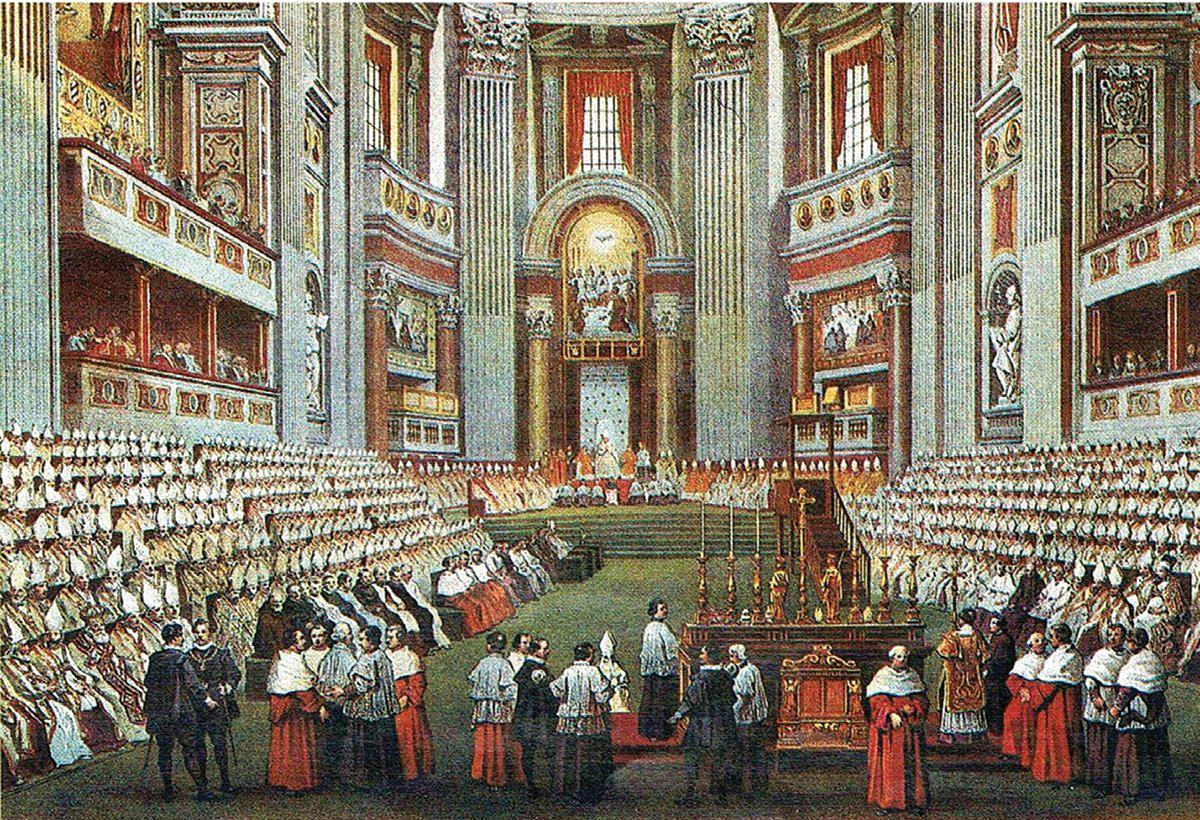
The magisterium presiding over a council. Shown here is the First Vatican Council, c. 1870.

In the late Middle Ages, the concept of papal infallibility came to fruition, but a definitive statement and explanation of these doctrines did not occur until the 19th century, with Pope Pius IX and the First Vatican Council (1869–1870). Pius IX was the first pope to use the term "Magisterium" in the sense that it is understood today, and the concept of the "ordinary and universal Magisterium" was officially established during Vatican I. In addition, this council defined the doctrine of papal infallibility, the ability of the pope to speak without error "when, acting in his capacity as pastor and teacher of all Christians, he commits his supreme authority in the universal Church on a question of faith or morals." This declaration wasn't without some controversy; the bishops of Uniate Churches walked out en masse rather than voting against the declaration in session, and the resulting declaration also had a great deal to do with the finalization of the Old Catholic Church schism that had been festering for some time. John Henry Newman accepted the Council's authority, but questioned whether the Council was truly an "ecumenical" council.

==== Pius XII and Paul VI ====
Later, Pope Pius XII (reigned 1939–1958) authoritatively stated the scope of the Magisterium further, stating that the faithful must be obedient to even the ordinary Magisterium of the Pope, and that "there can no longer be any question of free discussion between theologians" once the Pope has spoken on a given issue.

Pope Paul VI (reigned 1963–1978) agreed with this view. Theology and the magisterium have the same source, revelation, and closely cooperate: the Magisterium does not receive a revelation to resolve disputed questions. The theologian, in obedience to the magisterium, tries to develop answers to new questions. The magisterium in turn needs this work in order to authoritatively give solutions to modern problems in the area of faith and morals. Theology again, accepts these answers and serves as a bridge between the magisterium and the faithful, explaining the reasons behind the teaching of the magisterium.

=== Postconciliar era ===
The debate concerning the Magisterium, papal primacy and infallibility, and the authority to teach in general has not lessened since the official declaration of the doctrines. Instead, the Church has faced contrary arguments; at one end there are those with the tendency to regard even technically non-binding papal encyclicals as infallible statements and, at the other, are those who refuse to accept in any sense controversial encyclicals such as Humanae Vitae. The situation is complicated by changing attitudes toward authority in an increasingly democratic world, the new importance placed on academic freedom, and new means of knowledge and communication. In addition, some theologians have tried to push past the structures laid out by Pius XII to claim authority in theology in their own right. Others simply regard themselves purely as academics not in the service of any institution.

In September 2018, the Synod of Bishops was granted Magisterium over documents which are approved at their Synods.

== See also ==
- Sacred Tradition
- Catechism of the Catholic Church
- Roman Curia

== Sources ==
=== Books ===
- Boyle, John (1995). Church Teaching Authority: Historical and Theological Studies. University of Notre Dame Press. ISBN 0-268-00805-1.
- Curran, Charles E.; McCormick, Richard A., eds. (1982), The Magisterium and Morality, Readings in Moral Theology, Paulist Press, ISBN 0-8091-2407-6
- Gaillardetz, Richard (2012). When the Magisterium Intervenes: The Magisterium and Theologians in Today's Church. ISBN 978-0814680544.
- Gaillardetz, Richard (2003). By What Authority?: A Primer on Scripture, the Magisterium, and the Sense of the Faithful. ISBN 0-8146-2872-9.
- Dulles, Avery, Cardinal (2010). Magisterium: Teacher and Guardian of the Faith. Introductions to Catholic Doctrine. Sapientia Press. ISBN 978-1-9325-8938-2.
- Gaillardetz, Richard (1997). Teaching With Authority: A Theology of the Magisterium in the Church. Theology and Life Series, vol. 41. Liturgical Press. ISBN 0-8146-5529-7.
- Gaillardetz, Richard (1992). Witnesses to the Faith: Community, Infallibility, and the Ordinary Magisterium of Bishops. Paulist Press. ISBN 0-8091-3350-4.
- Mannion, Gerard; Gaillardetz, Richard; Kerkhofs, Jan; Wilson, Kenneth (2003). Readings in Church Authority - Gifts and Challenges for Contemporary Catholicism. Ashgate Press. ISBN 978-0-7546-0530-0.
- Sullivan, Francis (2003). Creative Fidelity: Weighing and Interpreting Documents of the Magisterium. Wipf & Stock Publishers. ISBN 1-59244-208-0.
- Sullivan, Francis (2002). The Magisterium: Teaching Authority in the Catholic Church. Wipf & Stock. ISBN 978-1-59244-060-3.

=== Articles ===
- Thomas Storck, "What Is the Magisterium" in Catholic Faith magazine, July/August 2001
- Bainvel, Jean (1912). "Tradition and Living Magisterium" . In Herbermann, Charles (ed.). Catholic Encyclopedia. Vol. 15. New York: Robert Appleton Company.
- John Young, "The Magisterium: A Precious Gift" in Homiletic & Pastoral Review (1 November 2008)
- Austin B. Vaughan, "The Role of the Ordinary Magisterium of the Universal Episcopate" in Proceedings of the Twenty-Second Annual Convention of the Catholic Theological Society of America
- Roger Mahony, "The Magisterium and Theological Dissent" in Dissent in the Church (Paulist Press 1988)
- Berington, Joseph (1830). "The Authority of the Church." . The Faith of Catholics: confirmed by Scripture, and attested by the Fathers of the five first centuries of the Church, Volume 1. Jos. Booker.

=== Papal declaration ===
- Pope John Paul II, "The Roman Pontiff Is the Supreme Teacher"
