= Catholic Church and capital punishment =

Stance of the Catholic Church on the death penalty

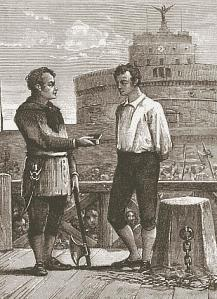
Giovanni Battista Bugatti, official executioner for the Papal States, from 1796 to 1865.

Since 2018, the Catechism of the Catholic Church has stated that the Catholic Church opposes the death penalty. That year, Pope Francis revised the Catechism to read that the death penalty is "inadmissible" and that the Church works "for its abolition worldwide". Prior to this, the 1992 Catechism promulgated by Pope John Paul II had permitted the practice, reading that "the traditional teaching of the Church does not exclude recourse to the death penalty", though he stated that the practice must be limited only to extreme circumstances.

Historically, the Catholic Church has supported the death penalty. Figures including Pope Innocent I, Pope Innocent III, Thomas Aquinas, Francisco de Vitoria, Francisco Suárez, Pope Pius V, Robert Bellarmine, Alphonsus Liguori, Thomas More, John Henry Newman, Pope Pius X, and Pope Pius XII all wrote in support of the practice. Conversely, several theologians and Church Fathers prior to the 5th century including Justin Martyr, Tertullian, Origen, and Cyprian of Carthage have opposed it.

Under the Papal States, the church employed state executioners, notably including Giovanni Battista Bugatti. Under Vatican City, the death penalty was legal between 1929 to 1969, but was never applied.

In the modern era, many Catholic theologians and philosophers argue that the death penalty is intrinsically evil, though this view is disputed by others. Development of church doctrine led to increasing criticism of the practice during the 20th century. Modern Church figures such as Pope John Paul II and the United States Conference of Catholic Bishops actively discouraged the imposition of the death penalty and advocated for its abolition. Others, including Avery Dulles, Charles J. Chaput, and Pope Benedict XVI have personally opposed the death penalty, while defending the rights of Catholics to support the practice.

Pope Francis has strengthened opposition to the practice, including with the 2024 declaration Dignitas Infinita. In September 2025, Leo XIV described supporters of the practice as not being truly "pro-life". Their views have been controversial and led to backlash from some Catholics, including Raymond Leo Burke, Gerhard Ludwig Müller, Athanasius Schneider, Scott Hahn, and Edward Feser, as well as the Society of Saint Pius X.

== Pre–16th century ==
The early church was opposed to the death penalty, with a church order from Rome dating to around 200 AD threatening excommunication to any Christian magistrate that carried out a death sentence. However, attitudes towards the practice began to change in the fifth century.

=== Pope Innocent I (405) ===
Pope Innocent I in his letter Ad Exsuperium, Episcopum Tolosanum (PL 20, 495) defended the death penalty:

It must be remembered that power was granted by God, and to avenge crime the sword was permitted; he who carries out this vengeance is God's minister [Romans 13:1–4]. What motive have we for condemning a practice that all hold to be permitted by God? We uphold, therefore, what has been observed until now, in order not to alter the discipline and so that we may not appear to act contrary to God's authority.

=== Pope Innocent III (1209) ===
Pope Innocent III, in the context of reconciliation of the Waldensians back to the church, said in a letter to Durand of Huesca:

We declare that the secular power can without mortal sin impose a judgment of blood provided the punishment is carried out not in hatred but with good judgment, not inconsiderately but after mature deliberation.

=== Thomas Aquinas (1225–1274) ===
In the Middle Ages, Thomas Aquinas reaffirmed this position. The following is a summary of Summa Contra Gentiles, Book 3, Chapter 146 which was written by Aquinas prior to writing the Summa Theologica. In it, Thomas Aquinas supports the death penalty.

For those who have been appropriately appointed, there is no sin in administering punishment. For those who refuse to obey God's laws, it is correct for society to rebuke them with civil and criminal sanctions. No one sins working for justice, within the law. Actions that are necessary to preserve the good of society are not inherently evil. The common good of the whole society is greater and better than the good of any particular person. "The life of certain pestiferous men is an impediment to the common good which is the concord of human society. Therefore, certain men must be removed by death from the society of men." This is likened to the physician who must amputate a diseased limb, or a cancer, for the good of the whole person. He based this on I Corinthians 5, 6: "You know that a little leaven corrupts the whole lump of dough?" and I Corinthians 5, 13: "Put away the evil one from among yourselves"; Romans 13:4: "[it is said of earthly power that] he bears not the sword in vain: for he is God's minister, an avenger to execute wrath upon him that does evil"; I Peter 2:13–14: "Be subjected therefore to every human creature for God's sake: whether to be on the king as excelling, or to governors as sent by him for the punishment of evildoers and for the praise of good." He believed these passages superseded the text of Exodus 20:13: "Thou shall not kill." This is mentioned again in Matthew 5:21. Also, it is argued that Matthew 13:30: "Suffer both the weeds and the wheat to grow until the harvest." The harvest was interpreted as meaning the end of the world. This is explained by Matthew 13,38–40.

== Reformation period to modern era (1520–1900) ==
=== Exsurge Domine (1520) ===
One of Martin Luther's positions was given by the 1520 papal bull Exsurge Domine as "[t]hat heretics be burned is against the will of the Spirit"; as such, it was one of the statements specifically in the bull which the pope declared as "condemn[ed], disapprove[ed], and entirely reject[ed] as respectively heretical, or scandalous, or false, or offensive to pious ears, or seductive of simple minds, and in opposition to Catholic truth".

=== Roman Catechism (1566) ===
The Roman Catechism or "Catechism of the Council of Trent", in its section on the Fifth Commandment, teaches that civil authority, having power over life and death as "the legitimate avenger of crime", may commit "lawful slaying" as "an act of paramount obedience to this Commandment which prohibits murder" by giving "security to life by repressing outrage and violence". It also states:

Another kind of lawful slaying belongs to the civil authorities, to whom is entrusted power of life and death, by the legal and judicious exercise of which they punish the guilty and protect the innocent. The just use of this power, far from involving the crime of murder, is an act of paramount obedience to this Commandment which prohibits murder. The end of the Commandment is the preservation and security of human life. Now the punishments inflicted by the civil authority, which is the legitimate avenger of crime, naturally tend to this end, since they give security to life by repressing outrage and violence. Hence these words of David: In the morning I put to death all the wicked of the land, that I might cut off all the workers of iniquity from the city of the Lord [Psalm 101:8].

== 1901–2013 ==
=== Pope Pius X (1908) ===
The 1908 Catechism of Pope Pius X teaches that the death penalty is lawful under the commandment thou shalt not kill:

It is lawful to kill when fighting in a just war; when carrying out by order of the Supreme Authority a sentence of death in punishment of a crime; and, finally, in cases of necessary and lawful defense of one's own life against an unjust aggressor.

=== Catholic Encyclopedia (1911) ===
The 1911 edition of the Catholic Encyclopedia suggested that "the infliction of capital punishment is not contrary to the teaching of the Catholic Church, and the power of the State to visit upon culprits the penalty of death derives much authority from revelation and from the writings of theologians", but that the matter of "the advisability of exercising that power is, of course, an affair to be determined upon other and various considerations". The 1911 Catholic Encyclopedia further states that:

Canon law has always forbidden clerics to shed human blood and therefore capital punishment has always been the work of the officials of the State and not of the Church. Even in the case of heresy, of which so much is made by non-Catholic controversialists, the functions of ecclesiastics were restricted invariably to ascertaining the fact of heresy. The punishment, whether capital or other, was both prescribed and inflicted by civil government.

It also states:

As regards the infliction of the death penalty, canonists generally hold that ecclesiastical law forbids inferior church tribunals to decree this punishment directly, but that the pope or a general council has the power, at least indirectly, in as much as they can demand that a Catholic state inflict this punishment when the good of the Church requires it. Finally, they hold that there is no valid argument to prove that the direct exercise of this power does not fall within the competence of the ecclesiastical forum, although it was the custom of the latter to hand over the criminal to the secular arm for the infliction of the death penalty.

=== Pope Pius XII (1952) ===
In an address given on 14 September 1952, Pope Pius XII made clear that the Church did not regard the execution of criminals as a violation by the State of the universal right to life. He argued:

When it is a question of the execution of a condemned man, the State does not dispose of the individual's right to life. In this case it is reserved to the public power to deprive the condemned person of the enjoyment of life in expiation of his crime when, by his crime, he has already disposed himself of his right to live.

=== Pope Paul VI (1969) ===
Pope Paul VI criticized the practice of capital punishment in Francoist Spain and the Soviet Union, and subsequently removed the statute on capital punishment from the "fundamental law" of Vatican City in 1969.

=== Various opinions (1978–2001) ===
Some Catholic writers, such as Cardinal Joseph Bernadin of Chicago, argued against the use of the death penalty in modern times by drawing on a stance labelled the "consistent life ethic". Characteristic of this approach is an emphasis on the sanctity of human life, and the responsibility on both a personal and social level to protect and preserve life from "womb to tomb" (conception to natural death). This position draws on the conviction that God has "boundless love for every person, regardless of human merit or worthiness".

The United States Conference of Catholic Bishops also advocated for the abolition of the death penalty. During the papacy of Pope John Paul II, the conference stated that "our fundamental respect for every human life and for God, who created each person in his image, requires that we choose not to end a human life in response to violent crimes if non-lethal options are available."

In contrast, theologian and cardinal Avery Dulles argued in a 2001 article that historical Church teaching and the then-contemporary Catholic magisterium do not advocate for the abolition of the death penalty and do not deny the right of the state to impose the death penalty in certain extreme cases. Dulles suggests that the commandment "Thou shalt not murder" permits the death penalty by a civil authority as the administrator of justice in a human society in accordance with the natural law. Dulles argues that the Church teaches that punishments, including the death penalty, may be levied for four reasons:

1. Rehabilitation – The sentence of death can and sometimes does move the condemned person to repentance and conversion. The death penalty may be a way of achieving the criminal's reconciliation with God.
2. Defense against the criminal – Capital punishment is an effective way of preventing the wrongdoer from committing future crimes and protecting society from him.
3. Deterrence – Executions may create a sense of horror that would prevent others from being tempted to commit similar crimes.
4. Retribution – Guilt calls for punishment. The graver the offense, the more severe the punishment ought to be. In Holy Scripture death is regarded as the appropriate punishment for serious transgressions. Thomas Aquinas held that sin calls for the deprivation of some good, such as, in serious cases, the good of temporal or even eternal life. The wrongdoer is placed in a position to expiate his evil deeds and escape punishment in the next life.

=== Pope John Paul II ===
==== 1992 Catechism of the Catholic Church ====
The § 2267 of the first edition of the Catechism of the Catholic Church (1992; first published in English in 1994) states:

If bloodless means are sufficient to defend human lives against an aggressor and to protect public order and the safety of persons, public authority should limit itself to such means, because they better correspond to the concrete conditions of the common good and are more in conformity to the dignity of the human person.

==== Evangelium vitae, 1997 Catechism ====
In his 1995 encyclical titled Evangelium vitae (The Gospel of Life), Pope John Paul II suggested that capital punishment should be avoided unless it is the only way to defend society from the offender in question, opining that punishment "ought not go to the extreme of executing the offender except in cases of absolute necessity: in other words, when it would not be possible otherwise to defend society. Today, however, as a result of steady improvements in the organization of the penal system, such cases are very rare, if not practically non-existent. He only accepted this punishment for the defense of other people, and only in very rare situations, rejecting it use for retribution or deterrence. " The § 2267 of the second edition of the Catechism of the Catholic Church (1997) was thus changed to:

The traditional teaching of the Church does not exclude, presupposing full ascertainment of the identity and responsibility of the offender, recourse to the death penalty, when this is the only practicable way to defend the lives of human beings effectively against the aggressor.

If, instead, bloodless means are sufficient to defend against the aggressor and to protect the safety of persons, public authority should limit itself to such means, because they better correspond to the concrete conditions of the common good and are more in conformity to the dignity of the human person.

Today, in fact, given the means at the State's disposal to effectively repress crime by rendering inoffensive the one who has committed it, without depriving him definitively of the possibility of redeeming himself, cases of absolute necessity for suppression of the offender 'today ... are very rare, if not practically non-existent' [Evangelium Vitae].

However, in a memorandum to Cardinal McCarrick made public in 2004, Cardinal Ratzinger (later Pope Benedict XVI) suggested that the 1995 assessment of the contemporary situation advanced by John Paul II was not necessarily binding on the Catholic faithful in regard to capital punishment; he wrote:

if a Catholic were to be at odds with the Holy Father on the application of capital punishment or on the decision to wage war, he would not for that reason be considered unworthy to present himself to receive Holy Communion. While the Church exhorts civil authorities to seek peace, not war, and to exercise discretion and mercy in imposing punishment on criminals, it may still be permissible to take up arms to repel an aggressor or to have recourse to capital punishment. There may be a legitimate diversity of opinion even among Catholics about waging war and applying the death penalty, but not however with regard to abortion and euthanasia.

In January 1999, Pope John Paul II, without changing Catholic teaching, except in the rejection of the retributive and deterrence justifications, appealed for a consensus to end the death penalty on the ground that it was "both cruel and unnecessary". He said that criminal offenders should be offered "an incentive and help to change his or her behaviour and be rehabilitated".

The 1997 update of the Catechism of the Catholic Church would remain in force until August 2018, when the Catechism was revised once again to take an even firmer stance against capital punishment and advocate for its complete abolition.

=== Pope Benedict XVI (2011) ===
In his Post-Synodal Apostolic Exhortation Africae Munus of November 2011, Benedict XVI called for the abolition of the death penalty:

Together with the Synod members, I draw the attention of society's leaders to the need to make every effort to eliminate the death penalty and to reform the penal system in a way that ensures respect for the prisoners' human dignity. Pastoral workers have the task of studying and recommending restorative justice as a means and a process for promoting reconciliation, justice and peace, and the return of victims and offenders to the community.

Later that month, Benedict XVI again proposed abolishing the death penalty:

I express my hope that your deliberations will encourage the political and legislative initiatives being promoted in a growing number of countries to eliminate the death penalty and to continue the substantive progress made in conforming penal law both to the human dignity of prisoners and the effective maintenance of public order.

== Contemporary period (2013–present) ==
=== Pope Francis (2013) ===
Pope Francis stated that he is against the death penalty. In 2013, Pope Francis advocated that "capital sentences be commuted to a lesser punishment that allows for time and incentives for the reform of the offender". In 2015, Pope Francis addressed the International Commission against the Death Penalty, stating that: "Today the death penalty is inadmissible, no matter how serious the crime committed." Francis argued that the death penalty is no longer justifiable by society's need to defend itself, and the death penalty has lost all legitimacy due to the possibility of judicial error. He stated that capital punishment is an offence "against the inviolability of life and the dignity of the human person, which contradicts God's plan for man and society" and "does not render justice to the victims, but rather fosters vengeance".

=== Vatican support for UN campaign against death penalty (2015) ===
The Vatican had also officially given support to a 2015 United Nations campaign against the death penalty. During a U.N. Human Rights Council meeting concerning the abolishment of capital punishment, Archbishop Silvano Tomasi declared that "The Holy See Delegation fully supports the efforts to abolish the use of the death penalty." The Archbishop also stated:

Considering the practical circumstances found in most States [...] it appears evident nowadays that means other than the death penalty 'are sufficient to defend human lives against an aggressor and to protect public order and the safety of persons' [...] We should take into account that no clear positive effect of deterrence results from the application of the death penalty and that the irreversibility of this punishment does not allow for eventual corrections in the case of wrongful convictions.

=== Modification to the Catechism (2018) ===
On 1 August 2018, the Congregation for the Doctrine of the Faith sent a letter to the world's Catholic bishops to warn them about the coming change of the teaching on the death penalty in the Catechism. On 2 August 2018, it was announced that the Catechism of the Catholic Church was revised, through a papal rescript, to state that the Church teaches "in the light of the Gospel" that "the death penalty is inadmissible because it is an attack on the inviolability and dignity of the person". The 1 August letter to the bishops regarding the change stated that it was consistent with the previous teachings of the Catholic Church regarding the dignity of human life, and that it reflected how modern society had better prison systems with a goal of criminal rehabilitation that made the death penalty unnecessary for the protection of innocent people. The decision was seen as being a result of the advocacy of María Asunción Milá.

The new text reads:

Recourse to the death penalty on the part of legitimate authority, following a fair trial, was long considered an appropriate response to the gravity of certain crimes and an acceptable, albeit extreme, means of safeguarding the common good.

Today, however, there is an increasing awareness that the dignity of the person is not lost even after the commission of very serious crimes. In addition, a new understanding has emerged of the significance of penal sanctions imposed by the state. Lastly, more effective systems of detention have been developed, which ensure the due protection of citizens but, at the same time, do not definitively deprive the guilty of the possibility of redemption.

Consequently, the Church teaches, in the light of the Gospel, that "the death penalty is inadmissible because it is an attack on the inviolability and dignity of the person", and she works with determination for its abolition worldwide.

=== Fratelli tutti (2020) ===
In his 2020 encyclical Fratelli tutti, Pope Francis repeats that the death penalty is "inadmissible" and that "there can be no stepping back from this position". He adds that the Catholic Church is committed for the worldwide abolition of death penalty, and explains: "The firm rejection of the death penalty shows to what extent it is possible to recognize the inalienable dignity of every human being and to accept that he or she has a place in this universe".

=== Subsequent remarks ===
On 9 January 2022, Pope Francis stated in his annual speech to Vatican ambassadors: "The death penalty cannot be employed for a purported state justice, since it does not constitute a deterrent nor render justice to victims, but only fuels the thirst for vengeance".

The Dicastery for the Doctrine of the Faith's document Dignitas Infinita, released on 8 April 2024, states that death penalty "violates the inalienable dignity of every person, regardless of the circumstances", and that "the firm rejection of the death penalty shows to what extent it is possible to recognize the inalienable dignity of every human being. [...] If I do not deny that dignity to the worst of criminals, I will not deny it to anyone".

=== Objections to the current stance ===
Two weeks after the Catechism was changed, 45 Catholic scholars and clergy signed an appeal to the cardinals of the Catholic Church, calling on them to advise Pope Francis to retract the 2018 revision made to the Catechism, on the grounds that its appearance of contradicting scripture and traditional teaching is causing scandal.

Thomas Petri, dean of the Pontifical Faculty of the Immaculate Conception, considers that the 2018 change of the Catechism and Fratelli tutti is not a radical and sudden rupture with previous Church doctrine, because the pope did not qualify death penalty as "intrinsically evil". He explains that historically the death penalty from a Catholic point of view is seen first as a means of retribution, and secondly of rehabilitation of the criminal and of protection of society, but that John Paul II in Evangelium vitae declares that the protection of society was the first objective of death penalty, and the logic of this "new understanding of punishment" is continued in Pope Francis' stance.

=== Pope Leo XIV ===
On October 1, 2025, Pope Leo XIV criticized the death penalty, comments that were widely interpreted as an attack on the second Donald Trump administration's treatment of refugees, immigrants, and prisoners on death row. He further stated that individuals who oppose abortion but support the death penalty are not truly "pro-life" and in contradiction to Catholic social teaching.

== Life imprisonment ==
In 2014, Pope Francis also proposed the abolition of life imprisonment, which he felt is just a variation of the death penalty. In 2019, he stated: "Life imprisonment is not the solution to problems, but a problem to be solved. Because if hope is locked up, there is no future for society. Never deprive anyone of the right to start over!". In 2020, in his encyclical Fratelli tutti, Francis called life imprisonment a "secret death penalty".

== See also ==
- Inquisition
- Capital punishment in the Bible
- List of people executed in the Papal States
- Capital punishment in Vatican City
- Helen Prejean
- Sanctity of life
