= List of people executed in the Papal States =

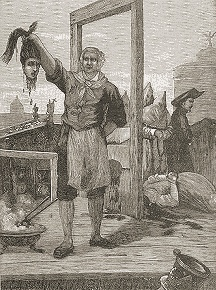
Giovanni Battista Bugatti, executioner of the Papal States between 1796 and 1861, carried out 516 executions.

This is a list of people executed in the Papal States under the government of the Popes or during the 1810–1819 decade of French rule. Although capital punishment in Vatican City was legal from 1929 to 1969, no executions took place in that time. This list does not include people executed by other authorities of the Catholic Church or those executed by Inquisitions other than the Roman Inquisition, or those killed in wars involving the Papal States, or those killed extrajudicially.

Most executions were related to the punishment of civil crimes committed within the Papal States, with the condemned convicted within the civil courts of the Papal States; for example, in 1585, Pope Sixtus V initiated a "zero tolerance" crackdown on crime, which according to legend resulted in more severed heads collected on the Castel Sant'Angelo bridge than melons in the Roman markets. The best records are from the tenure of Giovanni Battista Bugatti, the executioner of the Papal States between March 22, 1796 and August 17, 1861, who recorded the name of the condemned, the crime, and the location of the execution for each of the 516 "justices" he performed for the governments, papal or French. Bugatti's list ends: "So ends the long list of Bugatti. May that of his successor be shorter".

Before 1816, the most common methods of execution were the axe and noose (with burning at the stake used in high profile instances); after 1816, the guillotine (installed by the French during their control of Rome) became the norm. However, after 1816, two other methods—the mazzatello (crushing of the head with a large mallet, followed by a cutting of the throat) and drawing and quartering (sometimes, but not always, after a hanging)—continued to be used for crimes that were considered "especially loathsome".

The execution sites of choice were the Ponte Sant'Angelo, the bridge in front of the Castel Sant'Angelo, the Piazza del Popolo, and Via dei Cerchi near the Piazza della Bocca della Verita. Papal law prescribed a payment of only three cents of the Roman lira per execution for the executioner to "mark the vileness of his work" but did not prohibit the free lodging, tax concessions, and large pension awarded to Bugatti.

== List of people executed by the Holy See ==
=== 12th century ===
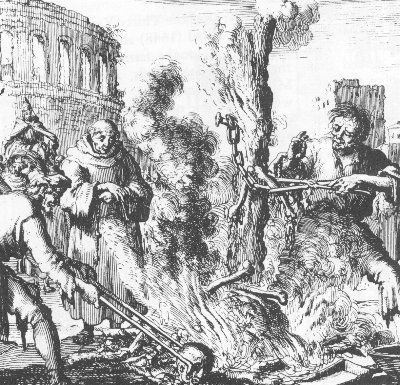
Arnold of Brescia burned by papal guards

- Arnold of Brescia, monk and participant in the Commune of Rome (1155)

=== 13th century ===
- Gerard Segarelli, founder of the Apostolic Brethren (July 18, 1300)

=== 14th century ===
- Fra Dolcino, Italian preacher of the Dulcinian movement (1304)

=== 15th century ===
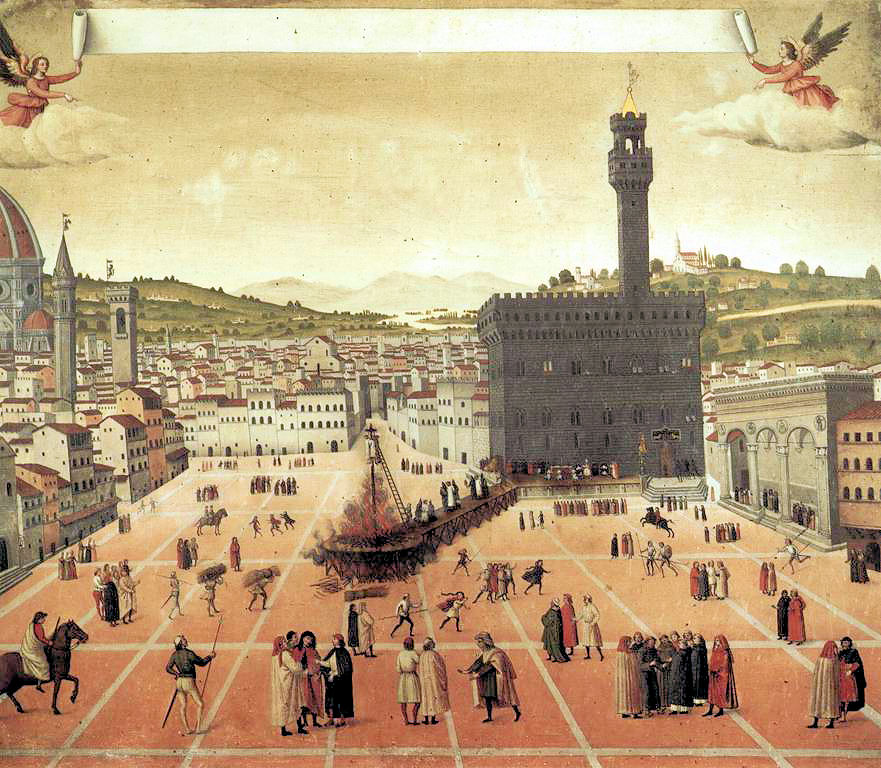
Execution of Girolamo Savonarola in the Piazza della Signoria, Florence

- Astorre I Manfredi, Italian condottiero (November 28, 1405)
- Matteuccia de Francesco, Italian nun and alleged "Witch of Ripabianca" (1428)
- Antongaleazzo Bentivoglio, Italian condottiero (1435)
- Eighteen thieves who robbed and killed Holy Year pilgrims (August 27, 1500)

Note: Girolamo Savonarola, Domenico da Pescia and Fra Silvestro executed in Florence (May 23, 1498) were condemned by a Florentine court. Similarly, Pietro Bernardino, a follower of Savonarola, was condemned and executed at Mirandola (1502).

=== 16th century ===
- Cardinal Alfonso Petrucci, convicted of plotting against Pope Leo X (July 16, 1517)
- Gian Paolo Baglioni, Italian condottiero (June 1520)
- Cardinal Carlo Carafa and Giovanni Carafa, Duke of Paliano, nephews of Paul IV, sentenced to strangulation in prison and beheading, respectively, by Pius IV, as his first public act (March 5, 1561)
- Pomponio Algerio, civil law student at the University of Padua (1566)
- Pietro Carnesecchi, Italian humanist (October 1, 1567)
- Aonio Paleario, Italian Protestant (July 3, 1570)
- Menocchio, Friulian miller, mayor, and philosopher (1599)
- Beatrice Cenci, Italian noblewoman convicted of murder (September 11, 1599)

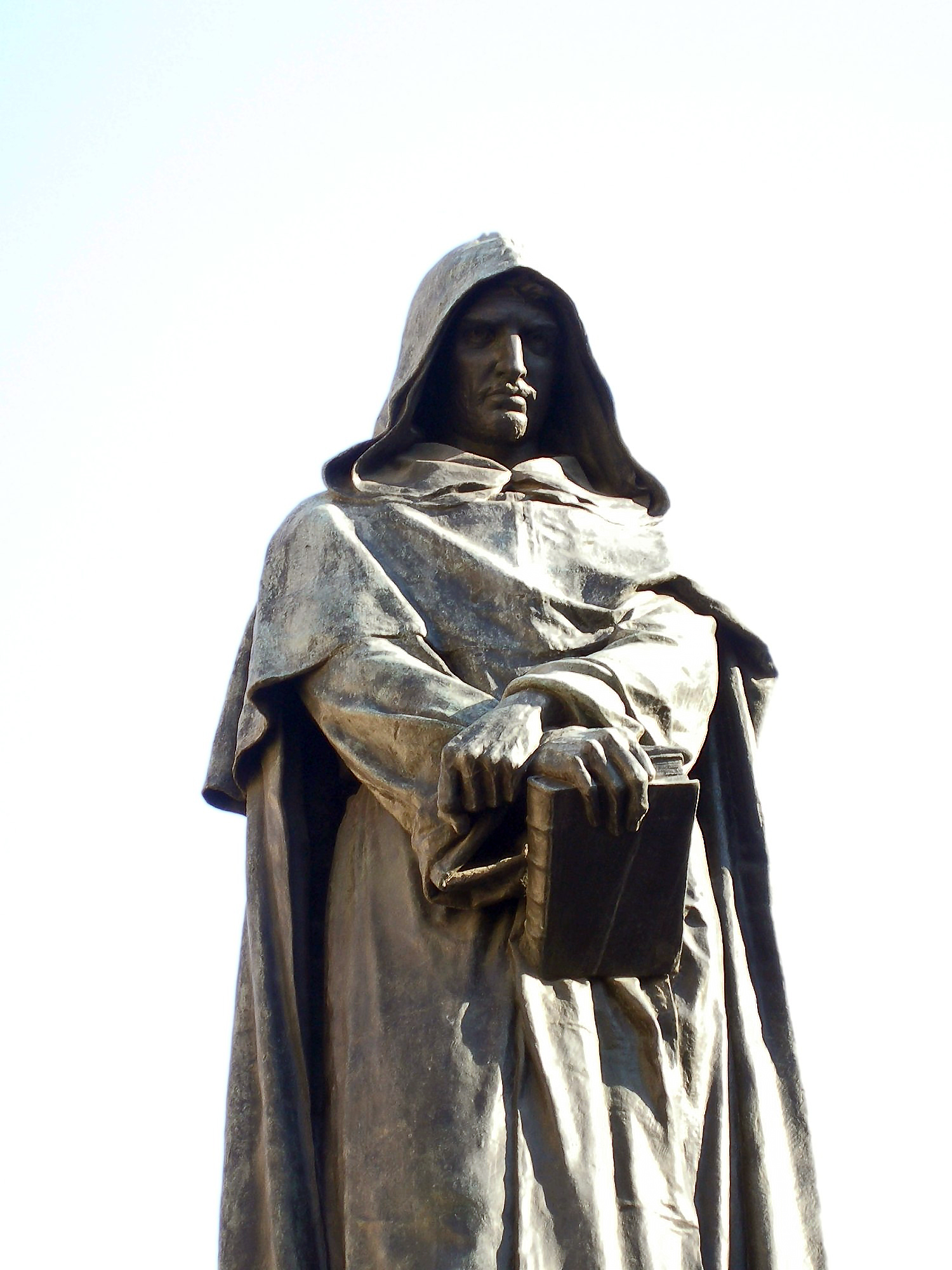
Monument to Giordano Bruno in the place of his execution in the Campo de' Fiori

- Giordano Bruno, Italian priest, philosopher, cosmologist, and occultist (February 17, 1600)

=== 17th century ===
- Ferrante Pallavicino, Italian satirist (March 5, 1644)
- Girolama Spera, daughter and accomplice of Giulia Tofana (5 July 1659)
- Assistants and clients of the poison-maker Giulia Tofana (5 July 1659)

=== 18th century ===
- Enrico Trivelli, decapitated, convicted of the composition of malicious and seditious writings against Pope Clement XII (February 23, 1737).
- Nicola Gentilucci, hanged and quartered in Foligno, convicted of strangling and killing a Priest, a coachman and of robbing two friars (March 22, 1796).
- Sabatino Caramina, hanged in Amelia, convicted of murder (January 14, 1797).
- Marco Rossi, bludgeoned to death and quartered in Valentano, convicted of the murders of his uncle and of his cousin (March 28, 1797).
- Giacomo dell'Ascensione, hanged at Piazza del Popolo, convicted of smashing many shops (sic) (August 7, 1797).
- Pacifico Sentinelli, hanged in Jesi, convicted of the murders of the gaoler and of his wife (October 30, 1797).

=== 19th century ===
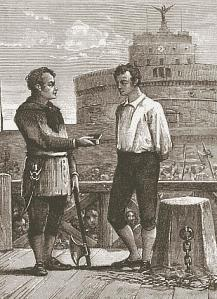
Giovanni Battista Bugatti pictured offering snuff to a condemned prisoner

Note: Executions between 1798 and 1815 (Congress of Vienna), executions in papal Rome were to some degree controlled by the French authorities.

==== 1800–1810 ====
- Gregorio Silvestri, hanged at Piazza del Popolo, self-confessed conspirator (January 18, 1800).
- Antonio Felici, Gio. Antonio Marinucci and Antonio Russo, hanged at the Ponte Sant'Angelo, convicted of robbery (January 20, 1800).
- Pietro Zanelli, hanged at the Ponte Sant'Angelo, convicted of forgery of money (January 22, 1800).
- Francesco Gropaldi, hanged at the Ponte Sant'Angelo, convicted of robbery (afternoon of January 22, 1800).
- Ottavio Cappello, hanged at the Ponte Sant'Angelo, convicted of attempted armed revolution (January 29, 1800).
- Alessandro d'Andrea, hanged at the Ponte Sant'Angelo, convicted of the theft of a watch (February 1, 1800).
- Gio. Batta Genovesi, hanged, quartered and his corpse burnt at the Ponte Sant'Angelo, convicted of stealing two ciboria; his head was, then, taken to the Arch of the Holy Spirit (February 27, 1800).
- Gioacchino Lucarelli, Luigi de Angelis, Lorenzo Robotti, Giovanni Rocchi and Antonio Mauro, convicted of strangling and killing a Priest, were hanged and their heads and arms were cut off and displayed at Porta Angelica, and two were burnt at the Ponte Sant'Angelo (May 6, 1800).
- Bernardino Bernardi, convicted of the same offence, was hanged and had his head and arms cut off which were, then, displayed at Porta S. Sebastiano (..., 1800).
- Giuseppe Zuccherini, Giuseppe Sfreddi and Giacomo d'Andrea, hanged and quartered at Piazza del Popolo, convicted of killing a messenger from Venice (January 19, 1801).
- Luigi Puerio, Ermenegildo Scani, Gaetano Lideri and Leonardo Ferranti, hanged and quartered in Camerino, convicted of killing a Spanish princess (January 27, 1801).
- Teodoro Cacciona, hanged and quartered at Piazza del Popolo, convicted of stealing a pair of boots and L.60 (February 9, 1801).
- Fabio Valeri, bludgeoned to death and quartered in Albano, convicted of robbing an Ariccia shopkeeper (February 14, 1801).
- Francesco Pretolani, hanged and quartered in Viterbo, convicted of robbing and killing an innkeeper and his wife (February 21, 1801).
- Giovanni Fabrini, hanged at Piazza del Popolo, convicted of murder in time of peace (June 6, 1801).
- Domenico Treca, hanged in Subiaco, convicted of killing his wife, a priest and another person (July 4, 1801).
- Benedetto Nobili, bludgeoned to death at Piazza del Popolo, convicted of killing his wife, a midwife and of his house's arson (September 1, 1801).
- Antonio Neri, hanged in Ancona, convicted of stealing two thousand golden and silver scudi from a goldsmith, using a false key (September 26, 1801).
- Domenico de Cesare, hanged at the Ponte Sant'Angelo, convicted of robbing a road-sweeper (February 8, 1802).
- Ascenzo Rocchi and Gio. Batta Limiti hanged and quartered at the Ponte Sant'Angelo, convicted of robbing carters (February 20, 1802).
- Gio. Francesco Pace di Venanzio, bludgeoned to death, his throat was then slit and he was quartered at the Ponte Sant'Angelo, convicted of killing a Jew and of robbery (March 15, 1802).
- Domenico Zeri, bludgeoned to death and his throat was then slit in Fermo, convicted of his father's murder (April 3, 1802).
- Salvatore Bozzi and Giuseppe Flacidi hanged and quartered at the Ponte Sant'Angelo, convicted of robbery (April 28, 1802).
- Agostina Paglialonga, hanged in Orvieto, convicted of three infanticides (May 5, 1802).
- Antonio Nucci, bludgeoned to death and quartered in Perugia, convicted of robbing and killing a friar (May 8, 1802).
- Luigi Fantusati, bludgeoned to death and quartered in Perugia, convicted of robbing and killing his master (May 8, 1802).
- Giovanni Ferri, Fortunato Ferri and Nicola Ferri, German brothers, hanged and quartered in Terracina, convicted of robbing a messenger from Napoli (May 25, 1802).
- Gio. Batta Germani, hanged in Ceccano, convicted of murder (May 29, 1802).
- Cosimo Moronti, hanged in Genazzano, convicted of premeditated murder (June 1, 1802).
- Filippo Cataletti, hanged in Frosinone, convicted of murder (June 18, 1802).
- Felice Rovina, hanged in Collevecchio, convicted of killing a hermit by strangulation (July 7, 1802).
- Bernardino Palamantelli, convicted of murder and robbery; hanged at the Ponte Sant'Angelo (September 13, 1802).
- Stefano Viotti, bludgeoned to death in Subiaco, convicted of his father's murder (September 13, 1802).
- Francesco Angelo Sorelli, hanged in Ronciglione, convicted of a woman's murder (December 15, 1802).
- Giacomo Balletti, bludgeoned to death in Ronciglione, convicted of his father's murder (December 15, 1802).
- Domenico Guidi, hanged in Viterbo, convicted of murder (December 18, 1802).
- Antonio Lavagnini, hanged and quartered in Zagarola, convicted of robbing 27 paoli from a man (February 5, 1803).
- Gio. Domenico Raggi and Giuseppe Cioneo hanged in Viterbo, convicted of robberies and murders (March 5, 1803).
- Antonio Boracocoli, hanged in Ancona, convicted of stabbing a sailor, of throwing his body into the sea, without killing him, and of robbing him 200 scudi (March 15, 1803).
- Francesco Conti, hanged in Città di Castello, convicted of violently deflowering a spinster, in her father's house, with five comrades and of stealing 30 scudi from her (April 26, 1803).
- Angiolo Rossi, hanged in Gubbio, convicted of bestial and senseless murder (sic) (May 2, 1803).
- Giovanni Tranquilli and Vincenzo Pellicciari hanged and quartered at the Ponte Sant'Angelo, convicted of thefts and a robbery (May 21, 1803).
- Nicola Rossi, bludgeoned to death and quartered in Terracina, convicted of the Terracina registrar's murder; his head was then displayed at Cisterna (June 7, 1803).
- Giuseppe delle Broccole, hanged in Frosinone (August 8, 1803), convicted of thefts and a murder.
- Vincenzo Bianchi, bludgeoned to death and quartered in Orvieto, convicted of robberies and a murder (December 10, 1803).
- Giuseppe Ceci, hanged in Frosinone, convicted of robberies and a murder (March 8, 1804).
- Crescenzio, also known as Vincenzo Imondi, hanged in Frosinone, convicted of willful murder (July 12, 1804).
- Mattia Ricci, hanged at Piazza del Popolo, convicted of murder and resistance to the Court (September 22, 1804).
- Angiolo son of Pietro di Agostini, hanged and quartered in Cascia, convicted of murder and robbery (October 10, 1804).
- Gregorio Pinto and Paolo Bimbo hanged and quartered in Jesi, convicted of robbery (October 17, 1805).
- Giuseppe Gatti, Mattia Gatti and Valentino Margheri hanged and quartered at Piazza del Popolo, convicted robbers (February 12, 1805).
- Domenico Civitella, hanged, convicted robber (February 12, 1805).
- Luigi Masi, hanged in Fermo (March 30, 1805), convicted of deflowering a spinster, of her battery and her father's murder.
- Filippo Mazzocchi and Giuseppe Guglia hanged and quartered at the Ponte Sant'Angelo, (June 10, 1805), convicted robbers.
- Sebastiano Spadoni, hanged in Iesi (September 4, 1805), convicted of his brother German's murder and of hiding his corpse in a well.
- Luigi Giovansanti, convict, hanged in Civitavecchia (September 23, 1805), convicted of the murder of another convict.
- Niccola Alicolis, hanged and quartered at Merluzza (October 1, 1805), convicted of murders.
- Santi Moretti, hanged and quartered at the little bridge out of Porta San Paolo by the executioner's helper (1805), convicted of robbery.
- Gioacchino, also known as Bernardino Rinaldi, bludgeoned to death and quartered in Campo de' Fiori (October 9, 1805), convicted of the murders of his wife, who was expecting two babies, and of his apprentice.
- Paolo Salvati, hanged and quartered in Macerata (December 11, 1805), convicted of robbing a papal messenger and a foreigner.
- Bernardo Fortuna, hanged and quartered in Ponte Felice (April 22, 1806), convicted of robbing a French messenger.
- Pasquale Rastelli, hanged and quartered in Amelia (May 20, 1806), convicted of robbery and murder.
- Tommaso Rotiliesi, hanged at the Ponte Sant'Angelo, (June 9, 1806), convicted for slightly wounding a French officer.
- Bernardino Salvati, hanged in Rieti (July 12, 1806), convicted of the murder of one of his companions.
- Giuseppe Pistillo called Fatino, hanged and quartered in Terracina (August 13, 1806), convicted of robberies.
- Giuseppe Agnone, hanged and quartered in Terracina, convicted of robbery (August 13, 1806).
- Giuseppe Chiappa, bludgeoned to death and quartered in Macerata (September 25, 1806), convicted of murder; he was a hired assassin, who had been paid 50 scudi to kill the father of a young man, who was sentenced to life imprisonment.
- Gioacchino Cellini, hanged in Frosinone (January 27, 1807), convicted of murders and robberies.
- Tommaso Grassi, hanged at the Ponte Sant'Angelo, (April 15, 1807), convicted of the murders of his brother-in-law and of another man.
- Luigi Tomeucci, hanged in Frosinone (April 21, 1807), convicted of murders.
- Cesare di Giulio and Bernardino Troiani hanged and quartered in Campo Vaccino (May 2, 1807), convicted of robberies.
- Giuseppe Brunelli and Agostino Paoletti hanged in Gubbio (July 6, 1807), convicted of premeditated murder caused by jealousy.
- Giuseppe Romiti, hanged in Narni (December 12, 1807), convicted of barbaric murder.
- Angiolo Caratelli, his brother Paolo Caratelli, Antonio Scarinei and Rosa Ruggeri hanged in Todi (July 6, 1808), because Rosa had asked the three men to kill her husband.

==== 1810–1819 ====
The following executions were carried out by beheading under French rule.

- Tommaso Tintori, local man convicted of homicide and first to be guillotined (1810).
- Saverio Ricca also known as Principe ("Prince")
- Giuseppe Loi convicted of robbery (March 5, 1810).
- Giuseppe Gieomenico, convicted of murder and robbery (March 12, 1810).
- Anna Morotti widow of Renzi, Vincenzo Gentili and Alessandro Valeri, convicted of murder (April 12, 1810).
- Domenico Dichilo and Antonio Talucci, convicted of murders (April 2, 1810).
- Raffaele Mori, convicted of willful murder (May 8, 1810).
- Giovanni Scipioni, convicted of murder, (May 28, 1810).
- Pasquale Masi, convicted of robbery, (June 27, 1810).
- Andrea Dagiuni, convicted of murder, (July 3, 1810).
- Michele Filippi, convicted of his uncle's attempted murder (July 7, 1810).
- Niccola Quintarelli, convicted of premeditated murder (July 30, 1810).
- Lorenzo Bellucci and Francesco Teatini, convicted of murder and robberies (August 21, 1810).
- Domenico also known as Gaspero Germagnoli, convicted of the murders of his father and of a woman (September 10, 1810).
- Evangelista Bufalieri, convicted of murder (September 14, 1810).
- Severio Iaunardi also known as Sfacona, convicted of premeditated murders (September 25, 1810).
- Giovanni Cusciè, convicted of premeditated murders (November 14, 1810).
- Celio Lanciani, convicted of premeditated murder (November 14, 1810).
- Clemente D'Angelis, convicted of his uncle's premeditated murder (November 19, 1810).
- Camillo Cerini and Caterina Tranquilli, convicted of murder and assassination (November 26, 1810).
- Antonio Grepi, convicted of premeditated murders (February 9, 1811).
- Giovanni Croce, convicted of murder with assassination (sic) (November 2, 1811).
- Gaspero Bacciarelli, convicted of assassination (May 18, 1811).
- Domenico Brucchioni and Gradigliano Patricelli, convicted of assassination (June 25, 1811).
- Bartolomeo econvictedzzi ?, convicted of assassination, (July 4, 1811).
- Gio. Domenico Pensierosi and Nicola Reai, convicted of assassination (July 13, 1811).
- Silverio Patrizi, convicted of murder and assassination (July 22, 1811).
- Prospero Montagna, convicted of premeditated murder (November 6, 1811).
- Luigi Matocci, convicted of premeditated murder (December 31, 1811).
- Francesco son of Pietro Paolo Mattia, convicted of assassination, (February 3, 1812).
- Domenico Cracciani, convicted of premeditated murder (February 22, 1812).
- Lorenzo Tiberi, convicted of his uncle's murder, was executed in Poggio San Lorenzo (March 18, 1812).
- Giuseppe Trombetti, convicted of premeditated murder and
- Pasquale De Sartis, convicted of assassination (March 30, 1812).
- Luigi Lombardi, convicted of assassination (October 2, 1812).
- Maria Antonia Tarducci, convicted of infanticide, (November 10, 1812).
- Emanuel Calvi, convicted of murder and assassination, (November 10, 1812).
- David Troia and Domenica Senese, convicted of conspiracy to commit murder (December 9, 1812).
- Giuseppe Padovani, convicted of assassination with theft (December 12, 1812).
- Benedetto Canale, convicted of assassination, and
- Giuseppe Sprega, convicted of premeditated murder (January 25, 1813).
- Pompeo Greco, convicted of assassination with premeditation of murder (sic) (January 29, 1813).
- Germano Franchi, convicted of attempted premeditated murder; the execution took place in Supino (February 15, 1813).
- Gio. Crisostomo Martini, convicted of assassination (April 2, 1813).
- Angiolo Maria Parisella and Antonio Gasparoni, convicted of premeditated assassination (November 15, 1813).
- Francesco Grossi, convicted of premeditated murder (November 24, 1813).
- Luigi Bellaria, convicted of premeditated murder (December 28, 1813).

Under Restored Pontifical Governance:

- Gio. Antonio Antonelli and Pietro Proietto, hanged and quartered, convicted of robberies, (October 22, 1814).
- Vincenzo Zaghetti, convicted of murder with robbery, hanged, and
- Sebastiano Tirelli, convicted of robbery, hanged and quartered (December 3, 1814).
- Francesco Quagliani, Mariano Bonotti, Gaetano Giordani and Angiolo Pozzi, convicted of robberies, hanged and quartered (March 13, 1815).
- Antonio Cipriani, bludgeoned to death and quartered, convicted of murder and larceny; the execution took place in Norcia (August 14, 1815).
- Francesco Perelli and Carlo Castri, convicted of premeditated murder, hanged and quartered (February 17, 1816).
- Domenico Posati, hanged convicted of premeditated murders; the execution took place in Narni (March 7, 1816).
- Giuseppe Fiacchi, hanged convicted of premeditated murder caused by hatred occasioned by a civil litigation (March 9, 1816).
- Giuseppe Micozzi, convicted of treacherous murder with larceny bludgeoned to death and quartered (April 6, 1816).
- Vincenzo Bellini, Pietro Celestini, Domenico Pascucci, Francesco Formichetti and Michele Galletti, convicted of robberies, hanged and quartered; the executions took place in Rome (May 18, 1816).
- Gioacchino de Simoni, bludgeoned to death and quartered in Collevecchio, convicted of his wife's barbaric murder (May 27, 1816).
- Giuseppe Tomei, hanged at the Ponte Sant'Angelo, convicted of premeditated murder con premeditazione (August 17, 1816).
- Tommaso Borzoni, beheaded at Piazza del Popolo, convicted of premeditated murders and larcenies (October 2, 1816).
- Pietro Spallotta, Benedetto Piccinini and Carlo Antonio Montagna, beheaded and quartered at Piazza del Popolo, convicted of robbery (October 10, 1816).
- Carlo Desideri, Luigi Brugiaferro and Giovanni Mora hanged and quartered in Viterbo convicted of robberies (October 16, 1816).
- Paolo Antonini and Francesco Di Pietro beheaded at Piazza del Popolo, convicted of robberies (December 14, 1816).
- Saverio Gattofoni, beheaded in Macerata, convicted of his wife's murder (January 20, 1817).
- Antonio Guazzini, hanged in Florence, convicted of murder and robbery (February 22, 1817).
- Gio. Francesco Trani, Felice Rocchi and Felice De Simoni, beheaded at Piazza del Popolo, convicted of murders and robberies (May 19, 1817).
- Agostino Del Vescovo, beheaded at Piazza del Popolo, convicted of murder and larceny against a priest (July 19, 1817).
- Antonio Casagrande, beheaded and quartered in Gubbio, and his head was then displayed atop the gate of the town, convicted of the murders of two young boys and a girl, with larceny (August 28, 1817).
- Angiolo Conti, beheaded at Popolo, convicted of his wife's murder (September 9, 1817).
- Alessandro Papini, beheaded at Piazza del Popolo, convicted of larcenies and robbery (September 30, 1817).
- Antonio Antoniani, hanged at the Ponte Sant'Angelo, convicted of premeditated murder (September 7, 1816).
- Domenico son of Giacomo Gigli, Roman, beheaded at Piazza del Popolo, convicted of senseless murder (sic) (December 1, 1817).
- (Jew name) Angelo Camerino, (Christian name) Giuseppe-Angiolo, hanged in Ancona, convicted of murder (January 13, 1818).
- Ambrogio Piscini, beheaded in Loreto, convicted of murder and robbery (January 14, 1818).
- Antonio Galeotti, beheaded in Perugia, convicted of treacherous murder and theft (February 23, 1818).
- Andrea Emili, beheaded at Piazza del Popolo, convicted of his father's murder; his head was then displayed atop the gate of Rocca Priora (April 13, 1818).
- Martino Sabatini
- Andrea Ridolfi hanged and quartered in Viterbo convicted of robberies; their quartered body parts were then displayed (April 22, 1818).
- Antonio Cicolono
- Luigi Renzi, hanged in Rieti, convicted of robbery and murder (November 21, 1818).
- Angiolo Antonio Piccini, hanged in Viterbo, convicted of robberies and other felonies and of the barbaric murder, in Civitella, of Miss Bonfiglioli and the robbing in her house (December 12, 1818).
- Domenico Fontana, beheaded at Piazza del Popolo, convicted of murders (March 10, 1819).
- Andrea son of Giuseppe Dolfi, Roman, beheaded at Piazza del Popolo, convicted of senseless murder, being incarcerated at the Colosseo (August 2, 1819).
- Raffaele Vattani, Roman, beheaded at Piazza del Popolo, convicted of his wife's poisoning (September 15, 1819).
- Pasquale son of Vincenzo Ferrini, convicted of robbery, beheaded at Piazza del Popolo, (December 2, 1819).

==== 1820–1829 ====
- Elia Sauve, convicted of larceny, beheaded at Piazza del Popolo, (September 16, 1820).
- Leonardo Narducci son of the late Bartolommeo, from Ischia, convicted of murders and robberies, hanged and quartered in Viterbo (October 26, 1820).
- Gio. Batta Clementi son of Giuseppe, from Rotella in the Ascoli papal legation, beheaded at Piazza del Popolo, convicted of murder and aggravated injuries (January 27, 1821).
- Carmine son of Pietro Scaccia from Torrici, diocese of Frosinone, aged 23, convicted of robberies, beheaded at Piazza del Popolo (April 7, 1821).
- Giuseppe Moriconi and Benedetto De Carolis beheaded at Piazza del Popolo, convicted of robberies (June 7, 1821).
- Carlo Samuelli and Salvatore Torricelli, from Tivoli beheaded al Piazza del Popolo, convicted of robberies, (June 14, 1821).
- Francesco Monti, Domenico Taschini and Luigi Onelli beheaded at Piazza del Popolo, convicted of robberies, (July 28, 1821).
- Vincenzo Zaccarelli and Vincenzo Moretti beheaded at the Ponte Sant'Angelo, convicted of senseless murders (August 6, 1821).
- Francesco son of Niccola Ferri, shot at the Bocca della Verità; his head was then taken to Collepiccolo, 46 miles away from Rome (March 23, 1822).
- Giuseppe Bartolini, beheaded in Viterbo, convicted of robberies and barbaric murders (April 30, 1822).
- Angiolo Antonio son of the late Giuseppe Monterubianesi
- Pietro Antonio son of the late Giovanni Profeta
- Angiolo son of the late Giorgio Mannelli beheaded at the Ponte Sant'Angelo, convicted of robberies (June 8, 1822).
- Domenico Piciconi from Caprarola, convicted of murder, assassination and other felonies, beheaded in Viterbo (May 24, 1823).
- Giovanni Binzaglia, beheaded in Perugia, convicted of the murder of a sixteen-year-old girl (August 13, 1823).
- Francesco Venturi in Castel Raimondo, convicted of robberies and other felonies (December 18, 1823).
- Antonio Capriotti, beheaded in Fermo, convicted of willful murder and robberies (July 10, 1824).
- Niccola Sebastianelli, beheaded at the Bocca della Verità, convicted of armed robberies (July 15, 1824).
- Domenico Maggi and Girolamo Candelori beheaded at the Bocca della Verità convicted of robberies and larceny (July 24, 1824).
- Pasquale Ciavarra, beheaded in Frascati, convicted of murder and robberies (October 6, 1824).
- Giuseppe Panecascio, beheaded in Frascati, convicted of murder and robberies (October 6, 1824).
- Michele Farelli and Camillo Pistoia hanged in Pisterzo convicted of adhesion to the murderous brigands (sic) (October 26, 1824).
- Tommaso Transerini, hanged in Propeli, convicted of adhesion to the murderous brigands (October 27, 1824).
- Marco Quattrociocchi, hanged at S. Francesco, convicted of adhesion to the murderous brigands (November 17, 1824).
- Giuseppe Sebastianelli, hanged in Vallecorsa, convicted of adhesion to the murderous brigands (November 20, 1824).
- Francesco Cerquozzi, hanged at S. Lorenzo, convicted of adhesion to the murderous brigands (November 22, 1824).
- Giovanni Pietrantoni, Biagio Cloggi and Vincenzo Bovi hanged in Giuliano di Roma, convicted of adhesion to the murderous brigands (December 1, 1824).
- Cesare Menta, hanged in Supino, convicted of adhesion to the murderous brigands (December 2, 1824).
- Giovanni Montini, hanged in Pratica di Mare, convicted of adhesion to the murderous brigands (January 19, 1825).
- Domenico Avoletti, hanged in Frosinone, convicted of premeditated murders (April 14, 1825).
- Lorenzo Maniconi, hanged in Supino, convicted of brigandish assassination (April 18, 1825).
- Giovanni Gasbarroni and Angiolo Gasbarroni hanged in Supino, convicted of adhesion to the murderous brigands (April 18, 1825).
- Casimirro Rainoni, beheaded in Ancona, convicted of senseless murder irragionevole (July 19, 1825).
- Leonida Montanari and Angiolo Targhini beheaded at Piazza del Popolo on 23 November 1825, convicted of lèse-majesté and of dangerous injuries.
- Giuseppe son of Vincenzo Franconi, bludgeoned to death at Piazza del Popolo, convicted of murder and larceny against a prelate (January 24, 1826).
- Luigi Ponetti, beheaded at Piazza del Popolo, convicted of aggravated murder (March 1, 1826).
- Pietro Antonio son of Felice Tanucelli, beheaded at Piazza del Popolo, convicted of senseless murder (March 15, 1826).
- Lorenzo Raspante, beheaded in Viterbo, convicted of barbaric and aggravated murder (May 6, 1826).
- Giuseppe son of Biagio Macchia, butcher, convicted of his wife's murder, beheaded (September 16, 1826).
- Luigi Zanoli, Angiolo Ortolani, Gaetano Montanari and Gaetano Rambelli, convicted of murder, and attempted the attempted murder of Cardinal Rivarola, hanged in Ravenna (May 13, 1828).
- Abramo Isacco Forti, called Marchino – and poisoning. (sic)
- Luigi Borgia son of the late Camillo from Montoro Romano, convicted of aggravated murder and resistance to authority with dangerous injuries beheaded at the Bocca della Verità (January 17, 1829).
- Filippo di Pietro Cavaterra, beheaded in Genzano convicted of his uncle's murder (July 13, 1829).

==== 1830–1839 ====
- Antonio Vichi, beheaded in Ancona, convicted of killing two babies with assassination (January 5, 1830).
- Angiolo Pasquali and Giuliano, Benedictine, diocese of Rieti, convicted of barbaric, premeditated murder caused by hatred occasioned by a civil litigation, beheaded in Rieti (January 30, 1830).
- Domenico Valeri, beheaded in Tolentino, convicted of his wife's murder (February 15, 1830).
- Luigi De Simoni, convicted of robberies and other felonies, beheaded in Albano Laziale (May 22, 1830).
- Vincenzo Bagliega from Chiaravalle, convicted of robberies, beheaded in Ancona (June 12, 1830).
- Giacomo Martucci, convicted of barbaric murder, beheaded in Codescipoli (July 28, 1830).
- Francesco son of Tommaso Battistini, Roman, beheaded at the Ponte Sant'Angelo, convicted of aggravated murder to get indirect revenge (August 18, 1830).
- Felice son of Francesco Teatini from Frascati, beheaded at the Ponte Sant'Angelo, convicted of senseless murder (September 11, 1830).
- Mattia Marinelli and Giovanni Canulli, convicted of robberies, beheaded at the Ponte Sant'Angelo (September 25, 1830).
- Antonio Ascolani, convicted of his uncle's murder beheaded in S. Benedetto, diocese of Fermo (October 23, 1830).
- Massimo Testa del Serrone, convicted of barbaric murder, beheaded in Paliano (July 12, 1831).
- Prospero Ciolli son of Francesco from Olevano, convicted of treason and larceny, beheaded at the Ponte Sant'Angelo (September 22, 1832).
- Francesco Pazzaglia di Colmurano from Tolentino, papal legation of Macerata, beheaded in Via dei Cerchi (February 4, 1833).
- Antonio Majani della Granciolla and Francesco Massarini from Falconara Marittima, beheaded in Falconara Marittima, convicted of night robbery and assassination (March 30, 1833).
- Luigi Gambaccini d'Arcevia, beheaded in Ancona, convicted of robbery with murder (May 7, 1833).
- Giuseppe Balzani della Mendola, papal legation of Rimini, convicted of lèse-majesté.
- Giovanni Antonelli, Roman, carter, convicted of his wife's murder, both beheaded in Via dei Cerchi (May 14, 1833).
- Antonio Urbinati di Paterno, convicted of premeditated murder, beheaded in Ancona (June 19, 1833).
- Benedetto Mazio son of the late Giuseppe, Roman, convicted of hideous premeditated murders, beheaded at the Ponte Sant'Angelo (July 13, 1833).
- Luigi Cesaroni from Monte Giuducci, legation from Urbino and Pesaro, beheaded in Urbino, convicted of Luigi Costantini's aggravated murder (February 22, 1834).
- Filippo Risi from Albano, convicted of murder on account of despicable reason, beheaded in Albano (June 14, 1834).
- Tommaso Centra from Rocca Gorga, convicted of the hospital cook's murder in the Civitavecchia basin (June 18, 1834).
- Mariano Caroli from S. Alberto di Ravenna, and Stefano Montanari from Cesena, both convicted of the first hospital attendant's murder in the Civitavecchia basin.
- Giovanni Amicozzi from Monteleone, convicted of premeditated murder, beheaded in Rieti (June 30, 1834).
- Michele Bianchi from Osimo, convicted of his wife's murder, beheaded in Osimo (August 19, 1834).
- Domenico Egidi, called Nino, from Ancona, convicted of willful murder, beheaded in Ancona (February 11, 1835).
- Francesco Lucarini a.k.a. Botticelli, convicted of barbaric murder, beheaded in S. Stefano, province of Frosinone (March 24, 1835).
- Giovanni Orioli from Lugo, beheaded in Rome, at the Ponte Sant'Angelo (July 11, 1835).
- Francesco Grossi from S. Severino, there beheaded, convicted of parricide (October 17, 1835).
- Antonio Rongelli from Belvedere, convicted of wilful murder, beheaded in Ancona (February 20, 1836).
- Antonio Sordini from Spoleto, convicted of wilful murder, beheaded in Spoleto (March 26, 1836).
- Antonio Pianesi from Monte Casciano, convicted of murders, beheaded in Macerata (October 27, 1836).
- Luigi Galassi from Pofi, convicted of murder and robbery, beheaded in Civitavecchia (December 21, 1837).
- Paolo Ceccarelli from Poggio Nativo, convicted of premeditated murder, beheaded in Rieti (January 3, 1838).
- Geltrude Pellegrini from Monteguidone, convicted of her husband's murder, beheaded in Via dei Cerchi (January 9, 1838).
- Giuseppe Venturini from Albano convicted of premeditated murder, beheaded in Via dei Cerchi (January 25, 1838).
- Giuseppe Conti from Mangiano and Santi Moretti from Castello, convicted of premeditated murder caused by jealousy, beheaded in Perugia (February 10, 1838).
- Domenico Bombardieri from Filettino, convicted of his mother's murder, beheaded in Frosinone (March 8, 1838).
- Ilario Ilari and Pietro Paolo Panci from Corneto, and Domenico Caratelli and Giuseppe Bianchi, from Viterbo, convicted of robberies beheaded in Viterbo (April 17, 1838).
- Antonio Piero from Jesi, convicted of barbaric murder, beheaded in Jesi (April 26, 1838).
- Luigi Martelli and Niccola Guadagnoli, from Manno, beheaded in Manno, convicted of murder and robbery (July 24, 1838).
- Luigi Perugini son of the late Vincenzo, from Montolono, beheaded at Madonna de' Cerchi, convicted of larceny (September 4, 1838).
- Domenico Antonio Bellini from S. Angelo in Capoccia, beheaded in Tivoli, convicted of aggravated barbaric murder (September 27, 1838).
- Dionisio Prudenzi from Camerino, there beheaded, convicted of uxoricide (October 27, 1838).
- Francesco Ferretti from Anagni, convicted of premeditated murder, beheaded in Anagni (July 3, 1839).
- Pietro Pieroni, convicted of murder and larceny, beheaded at the Ponte Sant'Angelo (October 15, 1839).
- Luigi Quattrociocchi, convicted of willful murder, beheaded in Veroli (November 5, 1839).

==== 1840–1849 ====
- Girolamo Mazza son of the late Lorenzo from San Marino, aged 29, convicted of Antonio Celli's hired parricide, beheaded in Via dei Cerchi (February 19, 1840).
- Anna Tomasi-Celli, aged 40, beheaded (February 19, 1840).
- Pietro Bidei, convicted of murder and robbery, beheaded in Civitacastellana (April 1, 1840).
- Mariano Laura, Roman, aged 30, convicted of willful murder, beheaded in Via dei Cerchi (May 13, 1840).
- Luigi Scopigno from Rieti, beheaded at the Ponte Sant'Angelo, convicted of sacrilegious theft of a sacred container with the dispersal of the sacred hosts (July 21, 1840).
- Bernardo Coticone, convicted of Rosano's premeditated murder, in Tivoli (July 28, 1840).
- Tommaso Brunori from S. Giovanni Rietino and Pasquale Priori from Segni, convicted of murders in the penal colony of Spoleto, both beheaded, in the Spoleto fortress (August 6, 1840).
- Angelo Crivelli a.k.a. Epifani from Terni, convicted of the murders of deacon Valentino Bevilacqua, of priest Basilio Luciani and of layman Raimondo Trippa, beheaded, in Terni (August 8, 1840).
- Pacifico Maccioni from Cingoli, aged 26, and Filippo Duranti from Golignano, papal legation of Ancona, aged 25, both convicted of robbery and the murder of a Swiss, outside the Porta San Pancrazio, beheaded at the Ponte Sant'Angelo, (August 22, 1840).
- Baldassarre Fortunati and Vincenzo Stefanini from Torri in Salina, aged 29, both convicted of murder with the intention of stealing, beheaded in Rieti in the Market place (September 21, 1840).
- Angelo De Angelis, Antonio De Angelis, his brother, and Giuseppe De Benedetti, the three of them were beheaded in Tivoli, convicted of murder and robbery (January 13, 1841).
- Vincenzo Morbiducci from Albacina, aged 61, beheaded in Macerata, convicted of premeditated murder (March 1, 1841).
- Pacifico Lezzerini from Cingoli, aged 25, convicted of premeditated murder and robbery, beheaded in Cingoli (March 4, 1841).
- Damiano Marconi, son of Nicola, aged 29, from Capranica and Antonio Demassini, son of the late Pietro, from the Fratta neighbourhood, aged 35 and
- Angelo Casini, son of Eugenio, from Carbognano, aged 25; the three of them were incarcerated in the Civitavecchia gaol; they were beheaded, for killing an hospital attendant in the Civitavecchia basin (March 27, 1841).
- Pasquale Carbone, son of the late Saverio, aged 40, from Cresciano in Abruzzo, Kingdom of Naples, convicted of a fellow convict's murder in the Civitavecchia basin, beheaded – and died unrepentant – (March 27, 1841).
- Lorenzo Jannesi from Arnara, beheaded, convicted of premeditated murder (May 22, 1841).
- Tommaso Olivieri, Roman, aged 24, convicted of premeditated murder, beheaded in Rome in Via dei Cerchi and died unrepentant (June 3, 1841).
- Luigi Lodi, aged 30, convicted of premeditated murder, in the Civitavecchia basin (June 8, 1841).
- Luigi Galletti, aged 28, idem.
- Pietro Firmanti, aged 27, idem.
- Vincenzo Orlei from Collevecchio, aged 47, convicted of murder and other felonies.
- Pietro Antonio Amici, aged approximately 33, and Michele Spoliti, aged 38, both from Colle Giove, convicted of willful murder, both beheaded in Rieti (June 19, 1841).
- Bernardino Carosi son of the late Vincenzo, called Scelletta, aged 48: a married man, peasant and sawyer, from Borbone, province of L'Aquila and
- Michelina Cimini daughter of the late Antonio, wife of Giuseppe Carosi, aged 35, spinner from Cagnano, in the Kingdom of Naples and
- Domenico Recchiuti son of Nicola, called Saponaro, a bachelor from Lama, province of Chieti, woolcarder, the three of them were convicted of larceny and the premeditated murder of Caterina Ichizzi, the six-month pregnant wife of Francesco, the clockmaker in the Vicar's service; beheaded at the Ponte Sant'Angelo, there was extensive popular turmoil and some injured people, because of some thieves and pickpockets, but the three died resignedly (June 28, 1840).
- Pietro Tagliacozzo from Olevano, convicted of his mother's murder, beheaded, in Via dei Cerchi (January 19, 1842).
- Bernardino Mirabelli from the province of L'Aquila, convicted of the parricide of the miller of Decima (sic), both aged 40; beheaded and then displayed in Via dei Cerchi (January 19, 1842).
- Domenico Fiori son of the late Giuseppe, from Sirolo, aged 30, convicted of murder; beheaded (July 11, 1842).
- Pasquale Grespaidi, aged 24 beheaded in Viterbo, convicted of killing a carbineer who had asked his name (July 30, 1842).
- Gaspare Pierini from Città di Castello, aged 23, convicted of murder and robbery, beheaded (October 15, 1842).
- Luigi Serenga, aged 24, from Fermo, convicted of the murder of a priest; beheaded while infirm (October 24, 1842).
- Giuseppe Ricci from Caprarola, aged 24, convicted of willful murder, beheaded in Ronciglione (January 24, 1843).
- Pasquale Boccolini, aged 34, from Loreto, convicted of premeditated murder, beheaded in Macerata (June 1, 1843).
- Gaetano De Angelis and Luigi De Angelis, from Velletri convicted of murder and robbery, beheaded in Velletri (September 12, 1843).
- Domenico Marcelli from Tivoli, aged 21, convicted of larceny, executed on the Piazza Madonna de' Cerchi (September 30, 1843).
- Vincenzo Moresi, Roman, aged 22, larceny, executed (September 30, 1843).
- Giuseppe Salvatori from Saracinesco, province of Tivoli, convicted of treacherous murder, executed (September 30, 1843).
- Domenico Abbo, beheaded in the S. Angelo fortress convicted of strangling and sodomizing his blood nephew in addition to other brutal, horrifying acts (sic) (October 4, 1843).
- Pietro Rossi, Roman, aged 24, fishmonger convicted of night robberies and dangerous injuries, with the complicity of
- Luigi Muzi, Roman, aged 23, cobbler, convicted of the same crimes, executed in Via dei Cerchi (January 9, 1844).
- Angelo Cece, aged 21, and Antonio Tintisona, aged 25, both from Monte Fortino, beheaded in Velletri, convicted of robbery, and dangerous injuries (June 1, 1844).
- Gio. Battista Rossi son of Francesco, from S. Vito, aged 22, a peasant convicted of larceny, sentenced to an exemplary death (August 3, 1844).
- Bartolomeo son of Pietro, aged 28, from Roccantica, and Giovanni Girardi aged 25, convicted of the murder of an Observing Friar Minor in Roccantica; beheaded in Poggio Mirteto (October 16, 1844).
- Angelo Cesarini from Canistro in the Kingdom of Naples, aged 26, convicted of murder and robbery against his cousin; beheaded in Paliano (December 21, 1844).
- Giovanni Vagnarelli son of the late Agostino from Gubbio, aged 26, a married peasant convicted of robbery and the murder of Anna Cotton Bavarese; beheaded in Via dei Cerchi (March 8, 1845).
- Raffaele Gammardella from Ancona, a convict, convicted of willful murder; executed in Spoleto (April 2, 1845).
- Giuseppe Micozzi and Antonio Raffaelli, both from Macerata, both convicted of murder and robbery against a road-sweeper; beheaded in Macerata (April 7, 1845).
- Pietro Bartolini from Ancona, convicted of the willful murder of Berneimer, a Swiss Jew; beheaded (April 10, 1845).
- Luigi Percossi, Roman, a convict who was found guilty of the willful murder of Angelo Bruschi, the gaoler; beheaded in Rome in Via dei Cerchi (April 19, 1845).
- Francesco Antonio Bassani from Monte Compatri, aged 23, convicted of the willful murder of a fellow convict in the Spoleto stronghold and there executed; the murder had taken place while the convicts were being administered the Holy Communion (July 3, 1845).
- Niccola Trombetta from Patrica nel Lazio, aged 69, convicted of a shopkeeper's murder and aggravated theft; executed in Maenza (August 12, 1845).
- Vincenzo Mariani from Macerata, 26-year-old cobbler, convicted of willful murder; beheaded in Via dei Cerchi (August 30, 1845).
- Giuseppe Dragoni from S. Anatolia, papal legation of Macerata, beheaded in Spoleto, convicted of the willful murder of the gaoler of the Spoleto stronghold (October 23, 1845).
- Niccola Ciarrocca from Massignano, aged 27, convicted of willful murder of a spinster he had impregnated before marriage; beheaded in Massignano sud (October 30, 1845).
- Francesco Meloni son of the late Pietro, born in the Scarpa neighbourhood, a 34-year-old goatherd, convicted of his wife's murder by strangulation; sentenced to an exemplary death (January 15, 1846).
- Fedele Moretta and his brother Benedetto Moretta, convicted of robberies, murders and other felonies; beheaded in Frosinone (March 4, 1846).
- Francesco Sciarra son of the late Francesco, from Ienna diocese of Subiaco, aged 24, convicted of robberies and murders; beheaded in Via dei Cerchi (March 21, 1846).
- Michele Pezzana called Mechelone, from Poggio Renatico, convicted of premeditated premeditato, convict in the Spoleto stronghold and there beheaded (November 26, 1846).
- Pecorari Angel, convicted of homicide in Poland, sent to Rome for execution (January 21, 1847).
- Angelo Pecorari, from Poli, aged 29. A peasant convicted of a woman's premeditated murder, sentenced to an exemplary death (January 21, 1847).
- Francesco Pesaresi from Osimo, aged 30, convicted of a fellow convict's murder perpetrated in Ancona penal colony; beheaded (April 24, 1847).
- Giovanni Ciampicolo, Giuseppe Galli, Francesco Pasquali and Mauro Franceschelli, convicts, convicted of three murders committed in the penal colony; sentenced to death, died unrepentant (July 1, 1847).

==== 1850–1859 ====
- Romolo Salvatori from Cisterna, aged 40, convicted of having the Archpriest of Giulianello in Anagni shot by the Garibaldini during the Republican period; beheaded in Giulianello di Anagni (September 10, 1851).
- Gaetano Pettinelli son of the late Giovanni, from Monteleone di Fermo, aged 34, bricklayer, convicted of murders; beheaded in Via dei Cerchi (September 27, 1851).
- Bonaventura Stefanini, Benvenuto Cavalieri and Pietro Ventroni, the three of them were beheaded on the main plaza of Fabriano, convicted of a priest's attempted premeditated murder (November 15, 1851).
- Pietro Giammaiere called Casciotta, from Terni, domiciled in S. Gemini, district of Terni, papal legation of Spoleto, convicted of murder and robbery and beheaded in the main plaza of Spoleto (September 25, 1852).
- Sabbatino Proietti, convicted of theft, highway robbery, and murder in Rieti, beheaded in Bridge Square, Rieti (August 20, 1853).
- Giacomo Biacetti son of the late Carlo, Roman, aged 26;
- Andrea Severi son of Antonio, Roman, a 28-year-old tanner; both convicted of robberies and aggravated thefts and a murder, beheaded at Cerchi (September 10, 1853).
- Vincenzo Iancoli from Ronciglione, convicted of robbery and murder and
- Francesco Valentini from Letera and
- Francesca Levante widow Ferruccini, convicted of murder; the three of them were beheaded in Viterbo (October 8, 1853).
- Francesco Leandri son of Marino, sentenced to death, convicted of murder and premeditated murder (October 12, 1853).
- Gustavo Paolo Epaminonda Rambelli, a 28-year-old from Ravenna, Gustavo Marioni, a 29-year-old from Forlì and Ignazio Mancini, a 30-year-old from Ascoli, all former customs officers; the three of them were convicted of the murders of many friars, under the orders of the extremely cruel (sic) Captain Zambianchì; beheaded at Cerchi, they died unrepentant, scandalizing the onlookers, because they kept on blaspheming until they breathed their last (July 22, 1854).
- Sante Costantini from Fuligno, a 24-year-old bachelor, accomplice in Commendatore Count Pellegrino Rossi's murder; beheaded in Via dei Cerchi (July 22, 1854).
- Pietro Chiappa, aged 22, Landerio Civitella, aged 30, Paolo Dolci, aged 26, and Filippo Dolci, aged 24, all from Velletri and convicted of robberies and murders; beheaded, in St. Carlo plaza in Velletri (August 9, 1854).
- Angelo Racchetti di Gradoli, convicted of premeditated murder, beheaded in the town of Valentano (September 30, 1854).
- Giovanni Sabbatini, from the Marche region, convicted of murder and attempted robbery; beheaded in Frascati (November 15, 1854).
- Giovacchino Leoni, from Caprarola, convicted of murder and the arson of the victim's corpse; beheaded in Ronciglione (November 28, 1854).
- Pietro Muzi, from Trevisano convicted for robbing and murdering his godfather, beheaded in the town of Acqua Pendente; he died unrepentant (January 16, 1855).
- Giuseppe De Cesaris, from Monte Leone di Cascia, convicted of robbery and murder; beheaded in Via dei Cerchi (February 6, 1855).
- Luigi Scipioni from Petescia, aged 28, convicted of premeditated murder and beheaded in Rieti (February 10, 1855).
- Domenico Scappoti from Sismano, aged 46, convicted of premeditated murder, sentenced to the ultimate torment in Terni (March 15, 1855).
- Bernardino Valeriani son of the late Giuseppe from Palombara, a 28-year-old ploughman, convicted of premeditated murder; beheaded in Via dei Cerchi (May 2, 1855).
- Filippo Troncarelli from Ronciglione, aged 29, beheaded in Ronciglione, convicted of his brother's murder (June 23, 1855).
- Crispino Bonifazi from Viterbo, convicted of matricide; sentenced to the ultimate torment (June 25, 1855).
- Francesco Bertarelli from Viterbo, convicted of robbery; sentenced to the ultimate torment (June 25, 1855).
- Antonio Moschini from a hamlet near Viterbo, convicted of robbery; sentenced to the ultimate torment (June 25, 1855).
- Giovanni Cruciani from Rieti, convicted of robbery; beheaded in Viterbo (June 25, 1855).
- Paolo Moretti from Monte Fiascone, beheaded; convicted of the murders of his blood sister and of his opponent (sic) (June 26, 1855).
- Pietro Antonio Barbero from Grotta di Castro, convicted of robbery, sentenced to the ultimate torment (June 27, 1855).
- Arberto Cicoria from Città di Castello, convicted of larceny and murder, sentenced to the ultimate torment (June 26, 1855).
- Giosuè Mattioli from Viterbo, convicted of robberies and sentenced to the ultimate torment in Viterbo.
- Neri Domenico Vetrella, convicted of robbery and sentenced to the ultimate torment (June 30, 1855).
- Benedetto Ferri from Casali di Viterbo, convicted of robbery and sentenced to death in Viterbo (June 30, 1855).
- Salvatore Tarnalli from Casali di Viterbo, convicted of robbery and sentenced to death in Viterbo (June 30, 1855).
- Antonio son of the late Ferdinando De Felici, Roman, a 35-year-old chaplain, convicted of attempt on the life of Cardinal Antonelli, Secretary of State, and sentenced to death Via dei Cerchi (July 11, 1855).
- Pietro Ciprini from Viterbo, aged 19, convicted of robbery and sentenced to death in Monte Rosi (August 7, 1855).
- Giacomo Salvatori from Valle Pietra, diocese of Subiaco, convicted of murder and sentenced to an exemplary death in Subiaco (August 17, 1855).
- Luigi Sarra from S. Angelo, aged 29, and Nicola Arrigoli from Treia, aged 22, beheaded in Civitavecchia (October 13, 1855).
- Alessandro Guenzi from Sinigaglia, aged 31, convicted of murder; executed in Toscanella (October 15, 1855).
- Germano Proietti beheaded in Civita Castellana (October 18, 1855).
- Arcangelo Finestraro from S. Buceto, convicted of his wife's murder, beheaded in Amelia (October 20, 1855).
- Pietro Pace, Giuseppe Partenzi and Martino Rossi, convicted of the murder of a young lady, beheaded in Spoleto (October 23, 1855).
- Maria Rossetti and Serafino Benfatti, convicted of the murder of Serafino's wife, beheaded in Perugia (…, 1855).
- Giovanni son of Giuseppe from Faenza, aged 36, convicted of a police inspector's murder, beheaded (October 29, 1855).
- Raimondo Bregna, Spaniard, convicted of premeditated murder perpetrated in Campagnano; beheaded (November 6, 1855).
- Cesare Barzetto, and Giacomo Mercatelli, both Roman and aged 30, convicted of the murder of the Termini gaoler; beheaded in Roma, they died unrepentant (January 9, 1856).
- Lorenzo Mariani from Terni, convicted of insidious murder, he died in Terni (April 5, 1856).
- Giuseppe Conti from Terni, convicted of insidious murder, he died unrepentant in Terni (April 5, 1856).
- Filippo Lucchetti from La Piaggia, convicted of premeditated murder and executed in Trevi (April 7, 1856).
- Odoardo Baldassarri from Ancona, convicted of Francesco Cinti's unpremeditated murder; executed in Trevi (April 14, 1856).
- Giuseppe Grilli from Albano, aged 26, convicted of murder and robbery; beheaded in Albano (April 26, 1856).
- Antonio de Marzi from Albano, aged 55, convicted of robbery and murder and sentenced to the ultimate torment in Albano (April 26, 1856).
- Pio Capolei from Marino, aged 22, convicted of the Brigadiere Maccaroni's premeditated murder; beheaded in Marino (May 8, 1856).
- Giuseppe Terenziani called Fritella aged 59, from Todi, convicted of his mother's murder; beheaded in Todi (June 18, 1856).
- Antonio Caprara called Ciovettolo, Roman, a 27-year-old carriage-maker, convicted of premeditated murder; beheaded (September 6, 1856).
- Bartolomeo Oli from Lobo in the papal legation of di Macerata, a 36-year-old peasant, convicted of murder and robbery; beheaded in Via dei Cerchi (September 6, 1856).
- Nemesio Pelonzi from Palombara, aged 30, convicted of the Palombara apothecary's premeditated murder; beheaded (December 13, 1856).
- Francesco Roschini from Marcellina, aged 27, convicted of premeditated murder; beheaded in Palombara (December 13, 1856).
- Nicola De Bonis from Marcellina, aged 27, convicted of premeditated murder; beheaded in Palombara (December 13, 1856).
- Antonio De Angelis from Marcellina, aged 27, convicted of premeditated murder; beheaded in Palombara (December 13, 1856).
- Achille Malaccari from Ancona, aged 30, convicted of his father's murder; beheaded in Ancona (January 26, 1857).
- Domenico Carloni from S. Valentino, diocese of Perugia, aged 40, convicted of murder and robbery; beheaded in Perugia (March 17, 1857).
- Anacleto Marchetti from Giulianello aged 35, convicted of the murder of a man and of a woman and of the arson of a granary; beheaded in Montefortino (May 5, 1857).
- Domenico Capolei son of the late Ottavio, from Marino convicted of the murder of Luigi Giuliani, the Marino Governor; beheaded in Marino (May 2, 1857).
- Francesco Elisei, from Velletri, aged 23 convicted of willful murder; beheaded in Civita Castellana (December 22, 1857).
- Serafino Ciucci from Subiaco, aged 34, convicted of murder with the deliberate intent of stealing and committing other felonies; beheaded in Subiaco (January 23, 1858).
- Davidde Foschetti from Bassanello, aged 32, convicted of the murder of a woman and beheaded in Orfe (March 16, 1858).
- Giuseppe Berfarelli from Viterbo, aged 22, convicted of murder and robbery; beheaded in Viterbo (June 23, 1858).
- Carlo Camparini from Viterbo, aged 21, convicted of murder and robbery; he died in Viterbo (June 23, 1858).
- Alpini Giorgio, Sebbastiano Filippo and Rossi Pietro from S. Martino, convicted of robbery, beheaded in Spoleto (August 7, 1858).
- Vincenzo Pagliara from Frosinone, convicted of willful murder; beheaded in Frosinone (October 3, 1858).
- Pietro Masciotti, convicted of murder and robbery; beheaded in Perugia (October 23, 1858).
- Vincenzo Lodovici, aged 33, convicted of willful murder and beheaded in the stronghold of Civita Castellana (January 8, 1859).
- Giovanni Cosinia, aged 26, son of the late Nicola, from Carbognano, convicted of murder and sentenced to an exemplary death (March 2, 1859).
- Gennaro Castellone, aged 28, son of Silvestro, from Cellano, convicted of murder and sentenced to an exemplary death (May 2, 1859).
- Nazareno Caponi, from Monteleone, convicted of fratricide and beheaded in Treia (May 11, 1859).
- Giuseppe Lepri, aged 30, from Civitella di Agliano, a robber who died in Viterbo (September 17, 1859).
- Pietro Pompili, aged 33, from di Civitella di Agliano, a robber who died unrepentant in Viterbo (September 17, 1859).
- Vincenzo Vendetta, Antonio di Giacomo, Luigi Nardini, Valentino Antonio son of Giacomo, and Antonio Vendeta, all from Velletri, convicted of robberies and murders; they died in Velletri (October 29, 1859).

==== 1860–1870 ====
- Luigi Bonci, papal legation of Perugia, sentenced to an exemplary death (January 14, 1860).
- Serafino Volpi from Orvieto, sentenced to an exemplary death in Orvieto (January 18, 1860).
- Antonio Simonetti, convicted of willful murder; beheaded in the Civitavecchia basin and died unrepentant (January 21, 1860).
- Giuseppe Alessandrini, from Jesi, aged 24, convicted of murder and sentenced by a Criminal Court to an exemplary death (March 14, 1859).
- Lugi Finochi from Corneto, aged 30, convicted of uxoricide; beheaded in Corneto (July 21, 1860).
- Adamo Mazzanti, from Jesi, convicted of the murders of his mother, father and son; executed (September 12, 1860).
- Luigi Gagliardi, robber convicted of assassination and murder; beheaded in Civitavecchia (January 12, 1861).
- Nazareno Gercorini, convicted of murder and robbery; beheaded in Civitavecchia (January 12, 1861).
- Gaetano Lucarelli, from Marino, aged 29, convicted of murder to get indirect revenge and died unrepentant in Marino (March 30, 1861).
- Cesare Locatelli, Roman, aged 37, convicted of premeditated murder, died in Via dei Cerchi (September 21, 1861).
- Angelo Lisi di Alatri, convicted of highway robbery and murder in Frosinone (April 30, 1862).
- Angelo Isola from Rocca Secca in the Kingdom of Naples, convicted of robbery, died in Subiaco (June 11, 1864).
- Antonio Olietti and Domenico Antonio Demartini of Rome, beheaded for homicide, these were the last executions by Bugatti (August 17, 1864).
- Saturnino Piscitelli in the Civitavecchia basin (May 20, 1865).
- Salvatore Silvestri in Viterbo (February 17, 1866).
- Antonio Ventura, should have been executed in Bracciano, but his execution was not carried out (May 23, 1866).
- Francesco Ruggeri and Pasquale Beraradi in Rome (July 21, 1866).
- Paolo Caprara in Supino (February 11, 1867).
- Ignazio Bubali in Veroli (March 12, 1867).
- Ascenzo Palifermanti in Zagarolo (October 8, 1867).
- Pasquale Dicori in Palestrina (May 23, 1868).
- Giuseppe Monti and Gaetano Tognetti in Rome (November 24, 1868).
- Francesco Martini in Rocca di Papa (July 14, 1869).
- Agatino Bellomo, last person executed by the Papal States, two months before Rome was captured by Italian army (July 9, 1870).
