= Umiliana de' Cerchi =

Blessed Umiliana de' Cerchi TOSF
- Born: 1219; Florence, Republic of Florence
- Died: 19 May 1246 (aged 27); Florence, Republic of Florence
- Venerated in: Roman Catholic Church
- Beatified: 24 July 1694, Saint Peter's Basilica, Papal States by Pope Innocent XII
- Feast: 19 May

Umiliana de' Cerchi (1219 - 19 May 1246) was an Italian Roman Catholic widow and a member of the Third Order of Saint Francis.

She came from the Cerchi family, prominent merchants, and was married in her mid-adolescence as part of a political alliance that her ambitious father had engineered though her husband later died and she fled to become a Franciscan after her father pressured her into accepting a second marriage.

Her beatification received approval from Pope Innocent XII on 24 July 1694 after the latter formalized her beatification in the recognition of the late Franciscan's local and enduring veneration.

== Life ==
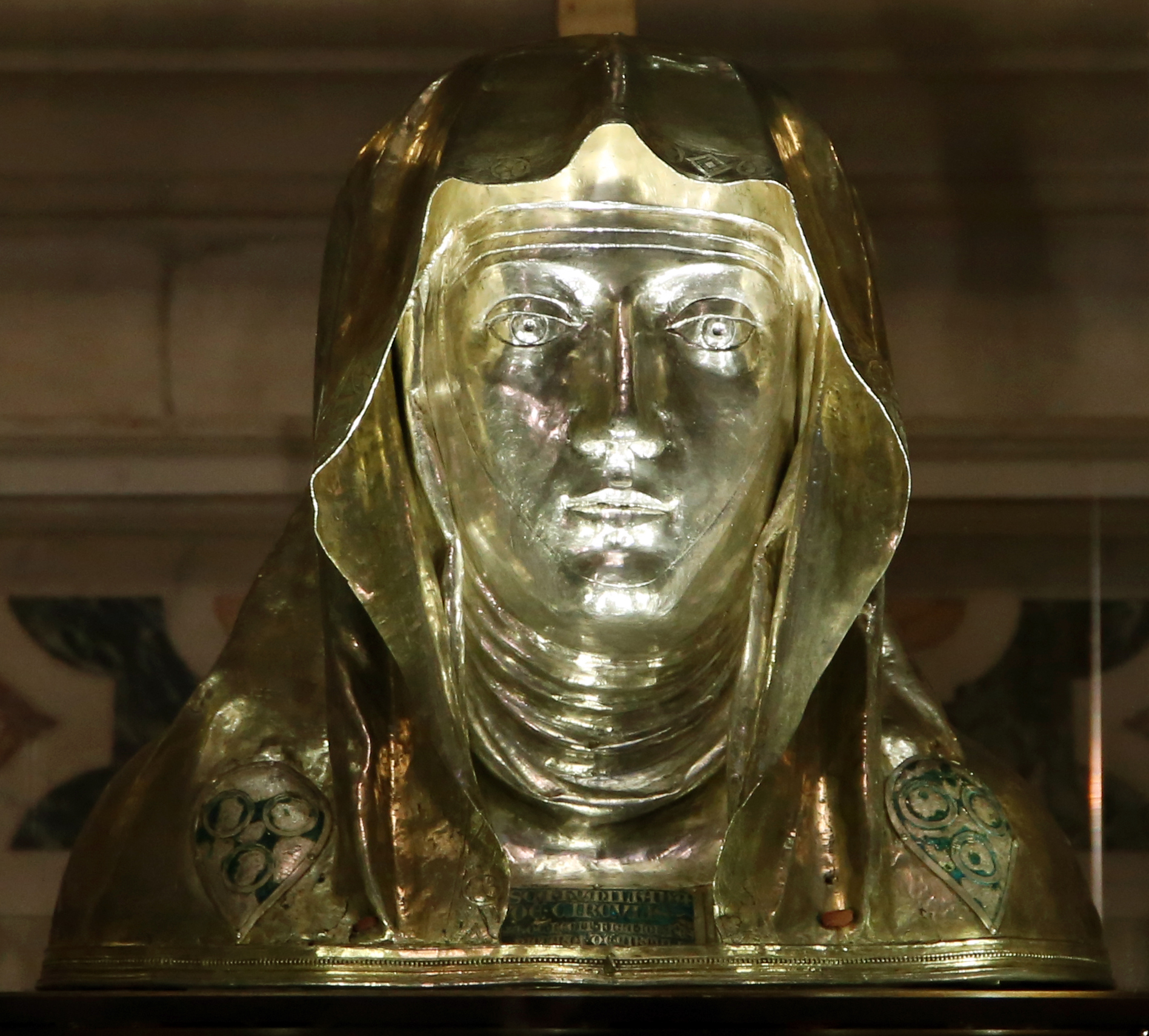
Reliquary of Umiliana de'Cerchi in Florence

Umiliana de' Cerchi was born in Florence in 1219 to a noble house to the prominent merchant Ulivieri de' Cerchi. Her father had six daughters and twelve sons. Her mother died when she was a child. One of her brothers held important public offices. Another brother was Arrigo and a sister was Ravenna.

In her childhood she was prone to undertaking charitable initiatives that sought to benefit the poor and the sick and those that knew her best were firm in their belief that she was being called to the service of God rather than to that of the world. Her ambitious father however aimed for political alliances and the augmentation of the reputation of his name and so promised her in marriage to the nobleman Bonaguisi in 1235. Umiliana submitted to this desire and married him though found he was avaricious and often treated her as a mere servant and she would retaliate with a spirit of meekness and patience. The marriage was more of an economic partnership for her father. In secret she would distribute food and clothes to the poor. She bore two daughters. Her husband fell ill in 1240 and it was she who nursed him before he died at which point she ceded his entire fortune to his relations on the condition that his relatives make restitution for her late husband's injustices. Her two daughters then was received into the home of her late husband's relations for care. Her father was less than impressed with this and later sued her late husband's parents for the return of funds he gave to them at the time of the marriage.

Umiliana retreated to her father's home and she later fled when he made repeated attempts to have her enter into a second marriage. The widow soon became a professed member of the Third Order of Saint Francis (at the convent of San Pietro a Monticelli) and henceforth led an austere life of solitude. She never left this solitude save for attending Mass or going out to visit the poor and the ill. This frustrated and even angered her father who decided to deprive her of whatever she still owned and he succeeded in doing this. Her confessor was the priest Michele Alberti. Umiliana was not ashamed to go out begging though she never used the alms for herself and instead distributed them to the poor. On one occasion she pleaded with the Lord to transfer the severe pain of an ill person to herself and she was later confined to her bed when the Lord appeared and restored her to health with the sign of the Cross. The widow also attended frequent Mass at the church of Saint Martin and she fasted on vital liturgical feasts as well as during Lent and Advent. Her brother Arrigo later became a third order Franciscan following his sister's example.

Umiliana fell ill and she knew her end was close. Her confessor was at her bedside as she died in the dawn of 19 May 1246 on a Saturday. Her feet were bandaged before people filed in to view her mortal remains. Her remains were interred in one location though later moved behind a wall near the stairs of the pulpit. Her brother Arrigo arranged for a chapel to in the basilica to receive her remains. A total of 47 miracles were recorded in the period of 1246 to 1249 and she is perceived to be the first cloistered third order Franciscan in Florence.

The chapel in the transept of the Basilica di Santa Croce is dedicated to her with a silver bust also there. It is also said that she is represented in Taddeo Gaddi's "Tree of Life" also in that same church.

== Beatification ==
The formal ratification of the late Franciscan's local cultus allowed for Pope Innocent XII on 24 July 1694 to issue a decree that recognized this and thus approved her formal beatification.
