= Dignitas Infinita =

2024 Catholic document on dignity

Dignitas Infinita ("Infinite Dignity") is a 2024 declaration on Catholic doctrine that outlines the importance of human dignity, explains its connection to God, and condemns a variety of what it defines as violations of human dignity, including human rights violations, discrimination against women, abortion, and gender theory. The document was released on 8 April 2024 by the Holy See's Dicastery for the Doctrine of the Faith and approved with a signature by Pope Francis. The declaration was generally well-received by Catholic clergy and laypeople, although it received criticism from those who argued against the Church's position on many of the issues covered.

== Background ==
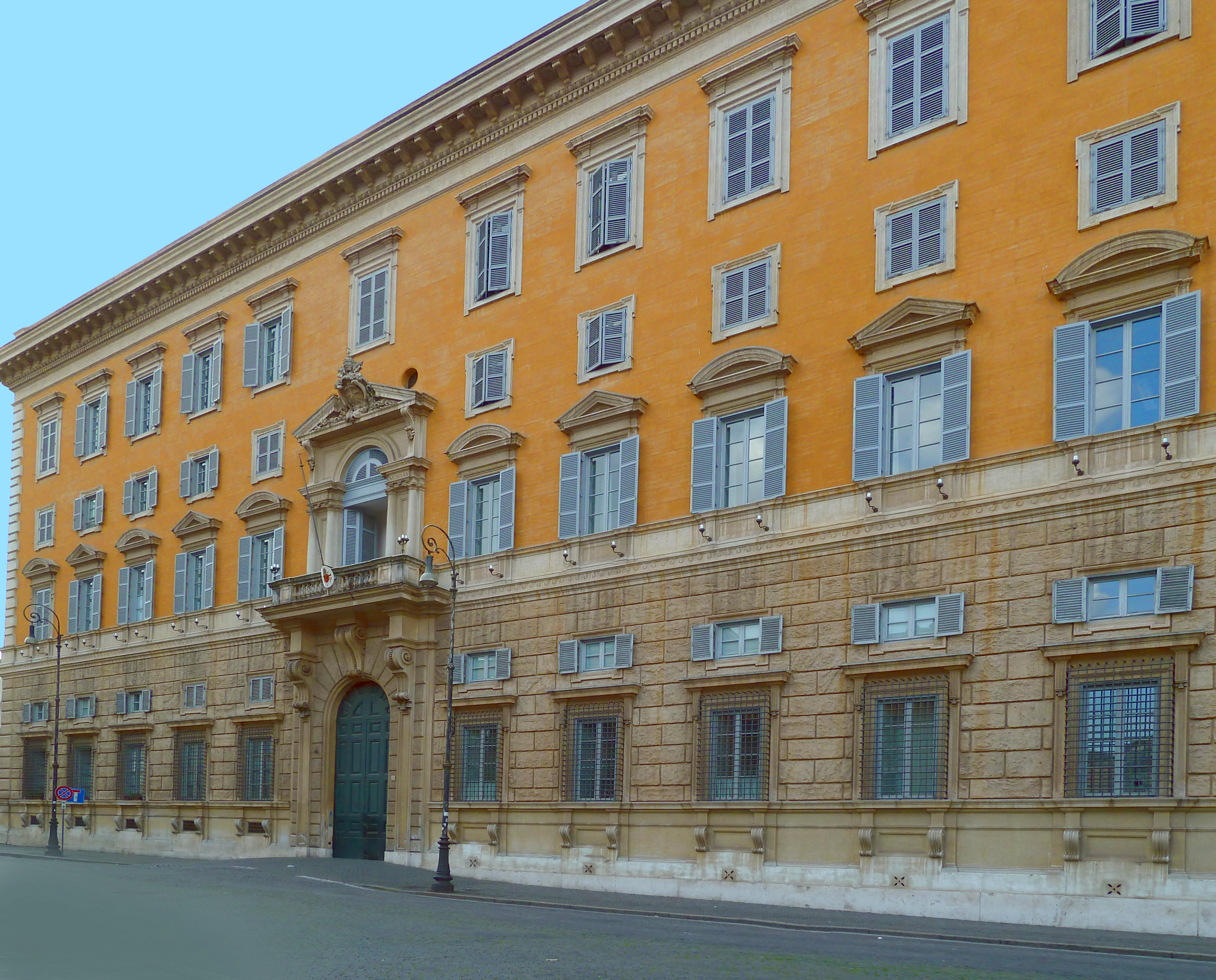
The Palace for the Holy Office in Rome, where the Dicastery for the Doctrine of the Faith is based

Work on Dignitas Infinita began in 2019, when the Congregation for the Doctrine of the Faith (renamed the Dicastery for the Doctrine of the Faith in 2022) decided to commence "the drafting of a text highlighting the indispensable nature of the dignity of the human person" in "social, political, and economic realms". After multiple drafts and years of work, in 2023, a draft of the declaration was sent to the Dicastery for review. The Dicastery accepted this amended version, and the text was brought to Pope Francis for review by Víctor Manuel Cardinal Fernández, the head of the Dicastery. The Pope then instructed Cardinal Fernández to place a further emphasis on current violations of human dignity in the declaration, and to make further connections in it to Fratelli Tutti, a 2020 encyclical by the Pope. By February of 2024, these changes were made, and in a March 2024 audience held with Pope Francis by Cardinal Fernández and Monsignor Matteo, Secretary of the Doctrinal Section, Dignitas Infinita was ordered to be published. The declaration was originally planned to be released with the name Al di là di ogni circostanza' ("Beyond any Circumstance"), but Dignitas Infinita ("Infinite Dignity") was chosen instead.

On 6 April 2024, the Holy See Press Office announced the declaration in a press release. In a press conference held on 8 April, attended by Cardinal Fernández, Monsignor Matteo and Professor Scarcella, the declaration was released.

== Contents ==
=== Summary ===
Dignitas Infinita is split into four main sections, with the first three recalling fundamental principles related to human dignity, and the fourth outlining modern violations of human dignity around the world, alongside an introduction. The introduction states that human dignity can be split into four categories, specifically "ontological dignity", "moral dignity", "social dignity" and "existential dignity".

The first section, titled "A Growing Awareness of the Centrality of Human Dignity", presents the history of the concept of human dignity, from classical antiquity to the modern age. The section places central importance on how human dignity is presented in both the Old Testament and the New Testament, and how this was interpreted by the Church Fathers and theologians such as Thomas Aquinas. The second section, titled "The Church Proclaims, Promotes, and Guarantees Human Dignity", argues that as humans are created in the image and likeness of God, as Jesus Christ became man, and as humans are destined to enter into Heaven, all humans have a divinely granted indelible human dignity. The third section, titled "Dignity, the Foundation of Human Rights and Duties", connects the concept of human dignity to the Universal Declaration of Human Rights, argues against moral relativism, and argues that humans deserve freedom.

The fourth section, titled "Some Grave Violations of Human Dignity", presents the list of "some grave violations of human dignity", and is the longest section of the declaration. The declaration states that "all offences against life itself, such as murder, genocide, abortion, euthanasia, and willful suicide" are contrary to human dignity, alongside "all violations of the integrity of the human person, such as mutilation, physical and mental torture, undue psychological pressures" and "all offences against human dignity, such as subhuman living conditions, arbitrary imprisonment, deportation, slavery, prostitution, the selling of women and children [and] degrading working conditions". The document offers an updated articulation of the Church's stance on surrogacy, claiming that it violates both the dignity of both the child and the surrogate mother. The declaration is notable for its particular focus on the issue of gender theory, with Dignitas Infinita being the first major Catholic document addressing the subject in detail. The declaration argues gender theory is "extremely dangerous since it cancels differences in its claim to make everyone equal", and thus "all attempts to obscure reference to the ineliminable sexual difference between man and woman" are "to be rejected". While the declaration condemns undue homophobia and discrimination, it condemns gender-affirming surgery as a threat to the image and likeness of man to God. It permits sexual surgery for people with medical genital abnormalities. The document also omits language from a 1986 doctrinal document that characterized homosexual acts as "intrinsically disordered". Additionally, the section condemns the death penalty, furthering Pope Francis' argument against the use of capital punishment.

The conclusion connects the declaration to the Universal Declaration of Human Rights, and reminds the reader once again of the importance of human dignity for all persons, regardless of their physical, mental, cultural, social, and religious characteristics.

=== Sources ===
The Declaration draws heavily from the teachings of Francis, but also of his predecessors Paul VI, John Paul II and Benedict XVI; this was described as a notable departure from previous DDF documents (such as Fiducia Supplicans), which tended to cite papal teaching almost exclusively from Francis. Some sections of the Declaration also quote older documents from Paul III, Leo XIII, Pius XI and a speech from Pius XII. The documents of the Second Vatican Council are also quoted quite frequently, as are the writings of the Apostolic Fathers and of the Church Fathers. However, some pointed out that the Document failed to quote the encyclical Veritatis splendor of Pope John Paul II, which defended the existence of moral absolutes.

== Reactions ==
Father Raymond J. de Souza wrote on the National Catholic Register that the declaration "will open new avenues for discussion, apologetics and evangelization". Cardinal Wilton Daniel Gregory, Archbishop of Washington, praised the document as "balanced and challenging", while Archbishop of Santiago de Chile Fernando Chomalí Garib said it possessed "an extraordinary intellectual and spiritual depth". Chiego Noguchi, a spokesperson for the United States Conference of Catholic Bishops (USCCB) expressed the Conference's gratitude towards Pope Francis for the Document, stating that it "emphasizes the long tradition of the church on the importance of always recognizing, respecting, and protecting the dignity of the human person in all circumstances.”

Father James J. Martin SJ, praised the document for condemning discrimination against homosexuals, but also said that the passages on gender theory and sex change were “not surprising” and "in line with previous Vatican statements" on the issue. He also expressed his hope that the condemnation of gender theory and sex reassignment were not used to justify transphobia. Nicolete Burbach, "lead expert in social and environmental justice at the London Jesuit Centre" of the Church of the Immaculate Conception, Farm Street, "said the document showed the Vatican continues to fail to engage with queer and feminist approaches to the body “which it simply dismisses as supposedly subjecting both the body and human dignity itself to human whims.”". Francis DeBarnardo, the director of New Ways Ministry, lamented the document's "supporting and propagating ideas that lead to real physical harm to transgender, nonbinary, and other LGBT people, while Jamie Manson of Catholics for Choice also said that she does not "buy that women who choose abortion and Catholics who support abortion rights are 'evil' as this document suggests". Sister Jeannine Gramick SL, a leading member of New Ways Ministry wrote a letter to Pope Francis, criticizing language used in the Declaration in relation to LGBT people; the Pope replied that "transgender people must be accepted and integrated into society", but reinstated the condemnation of gender ideology and sex reassignment in the Declaration. She added that "gender ideology" means "something other than homosexual or transsexual people. Gender ideology makes everyone equal without respect for personal history. I understand the concern about that paragraph in Dignitas Infinita, but it refers not to transgender people but to gender ideology, which nullifies differences."

== See also ==
- Catholic Church and capital punishment
- Pope Francis bibliography
- Pope Francis and LGBT topics
- Catholic Church and homosexuality
- Catholic Church and abortion
