= Mazzatello =

Method of capital punishment

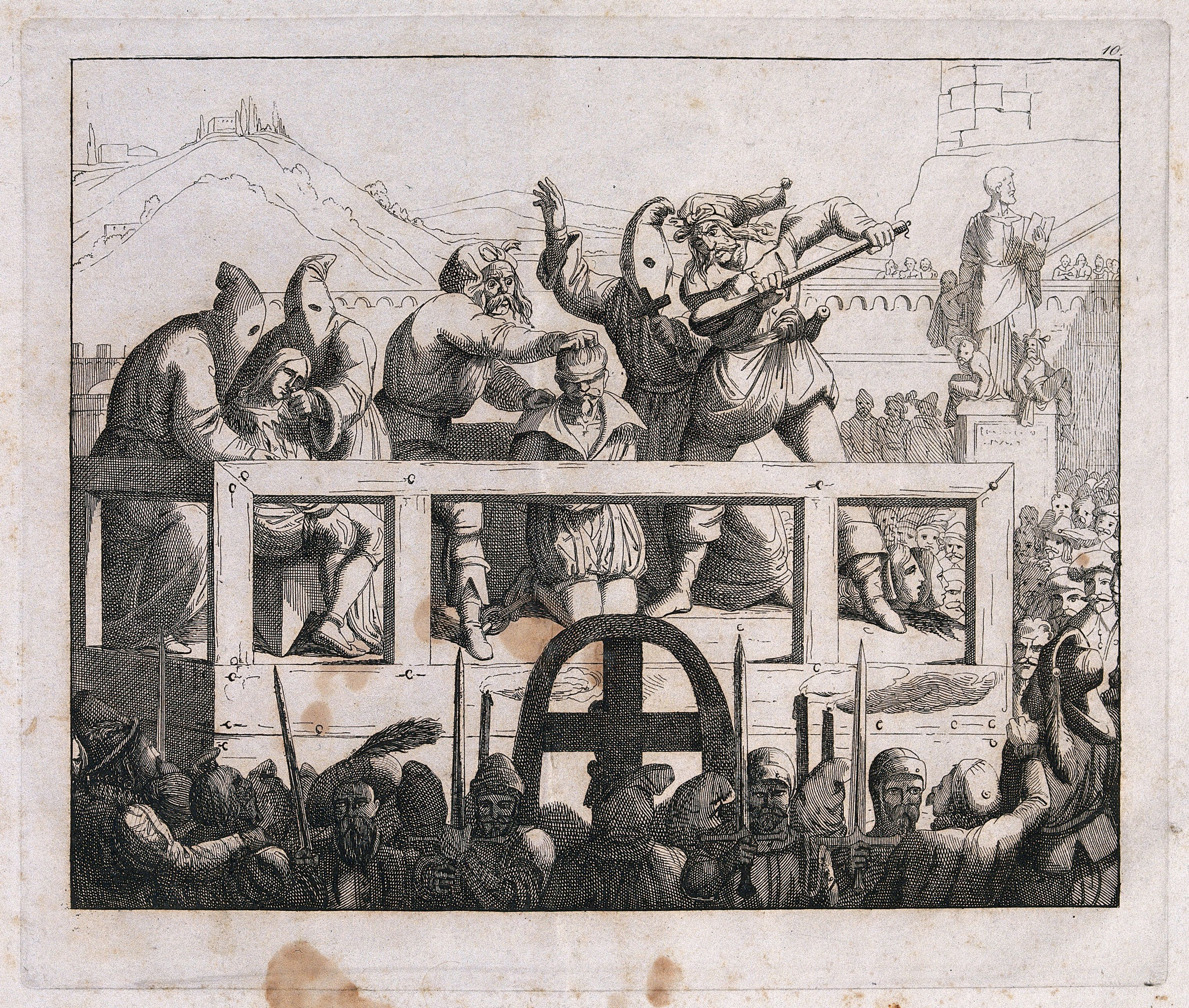
Giacomo Cenci was executed in Rome in 1599 for his involvement in the patricide of his father, Count Francesco Cenci, committed by Giacomo's sister Beatrice. He was struck on the head with a mace (mazzolatura). Etching, ca. 1850.

The Mazzatello (abbreviate d mazza), more properly mazzolatura ('to strike or bludgeon with a mace'), is an Italian term that refers to a method of capital punishment involving the use of a mace, mallet, or club-like weapon to inflict head trauma. It was historically used in Italy, particularly by the Papal States, for executing individuals convicted of particularly odious crimes. The method was named after the implement used in the execution: a large, long-handled mace, mallet, or pollaxe, which is a heavy, blunt weapon or tool used for striking or bludgeoning. The term mazzolatura comes from mazza, which means mace, mallet, club, or sledgehammer in Italian. A stone base was often used on which the executioner forced the criminal to place their head; traces of it can be found in some squares of Italian cities, including Modena.

It was abolished in Italy during the Napoleonic era but was later reinstated in some states, notably in the Papal States. Giovanni Battista Bugatti (known as Mastro Titta), the famous executioner of the papal government, recalls in his memoirs that he used the "mazzolato" on numerous condemned persons.

The last reported use of this form of punishment was in September 1806; the much more common capital punishments inflicted by the Papal States were hanging or beheading. According to author Geoffrey Abbott, mazzatello constituted "one of the most brutal methods of execution ever devised, requiring minimal skill on the part of the executioner and superhuman acquiescence by the victim". Megivern cites mazzatello as one example of an execution method devised by the Papal States that "competed with and in some instances surpassed those of other regimes for cruelty". Curiously, this form of execution can also be considered merciful - while public and bloody, it was also all-but instant, and after the first instant the condemned was entirely unconscious, and suffered no pain.

The condemned would be led to an execution scaffold site in a public square of Rome, accompanied by a priest (the confessor of the condemned); the platform also contained a coffin and the masked executioner, dressed in black. A prayer would first be said for the condemned's soul. Then, the mallet would be raised, swung through the air to gain momentum, and then brought down on the head of the prisoner, similar to a contemporary method of slaughtering cattle in stockyards. The condemned was usually knocked unconscious rather than being killed instantly, so the throat of the prisoner would then be slit with a knife.

== Earliest recorded use ==
Early evidence can be found in the 15th-century jurist Stefano Infessura's report on the execution of Christoforo Castanea, Count of Castel Leone, in May 1490 in Rome for high treason and the attempted murder of Cem Sultan and Pope Innocent VIII (the Castanea Conspiracy; the plot to poison Cem and Pope Innocent VIII foiled). Castanea was struck on the head with a large wooden mace and, afterward, pierced with an iron dagger in the chest and heart. Upon his death, his body was divided into four parts: the arms with the head and the chest were suspended at the gate of the Castle (Castel Sant'Angelo); another part at the gate of Porta San Paolo; another at the gate of Porta San Giovanni; and the rest at the gate of Porta del Popolo. Similarly, Stendhal described the execution of the Italian noble Giacomo Cenci in 1599. Giacomo, a co-conspirator with his sister Beatrice Cenci and their stepmother Lucrezia, who were beheaded for their part, was executed for his role in the patricide of their abusive father, Count Francesco Cenci. Francesco had repeatedly raped his daughter Beatrice during her youth and had violently abused the other members of his family. Giacomo was first tortured with red-hot tongs, then struck to death with a mace (executed by mazzatello), and finally quartered. The sensational murder trial and the events leading up to it sent shockwaves across Europe and deeply affected the people of Rome, who protested against the papal tribunal's decision.

A variation of this method appears in chapter 35 of Alexandre Dumas' novel The Count of Monte Cristo as la mazzolata and mazzolato, when a prisoner sentenced to execution is bludgeoned on the side of his head with a mace.

Along with drawing and quartering (sometimes, but not always, after a hanging), mazzatello was reserved for crimes that were considered "especially loathsome".

== See also ==
- Breaking wheel
