= Fratelli tutti =

2020 encyclical of Pope Francis

Fratelli tutti Italian for 'All Brothers' Encyclical of Pope Francis
- Signature date: 3 October 2020
- Subject: On fraternity and social friendship
- Number: 3 of 4 of the pontificate
- Text: In Latin; In English
- AAS: 112 (11): 969-1074

Fratelli tutti (lit. 'All brothers') is the third encyclical of Pope Francis, subtitled "on fraternity and social friendship"; it was released in 2020. In the document, Francis states that the way the COVID-19 pandemic was managed by world countries had shown a failure in global cooperation. The encyclical calls for more human fraternity and solidarity, and is a plea to reject wars.

The document was signed on 3 October 2020, on the occasion of Pope Francis's visit to the tomb of his namesake, Francis of Assisi, and was published the following day on the saint's feast day.

== Background ==
Fratelli tutti is Pope Francis' third encyclical letter, after Lumen fidei and Laudato si'. The document was first announced on 5 September 2020.

The encyclical's title is taken from Francis of Assisi's Admonitions. Pope Francis had alluded to the same quotation on 14 May 2020, when he celebrated Mass at the Domus Sanctae Marthae in Vatican City:

St Francis of Assisi used to say: "All brothers and sisters". And so, men and women of every religious confession are uniting themselves today in prayer and penance to ask for the grace of healing from this pandemic.

On 4 February 2019, Pope Francis signed the Document on Human Fraternity for World Peace and Living Together while on an apostolic journey to the United Arab Emirates. Co-signing the document was the grand imam of Al-Azhar, Ahmad Al-Tayyeb.

Before the publication of the encyclical its title was criticized by Father Thomas J. Reese SJ, who found it to be discriminatory toward women, because the literal translation of the title is "Brothers all". However, the Italian phrase has the common connotation of "all of humanity" and is, by default, inclusive. The Catholic Women’s Council wrote an open letter to the pope "expressing concern" that the title gives the impression that the encyclical is addressed only to men, which created frustrations in a Church that does not recognize female priesthood. Phyllis Zagano also criticized the title, saying: "Too much is at stake. Too many women are being insulted. Too many female lives are at risk".

== Signature and publication ==
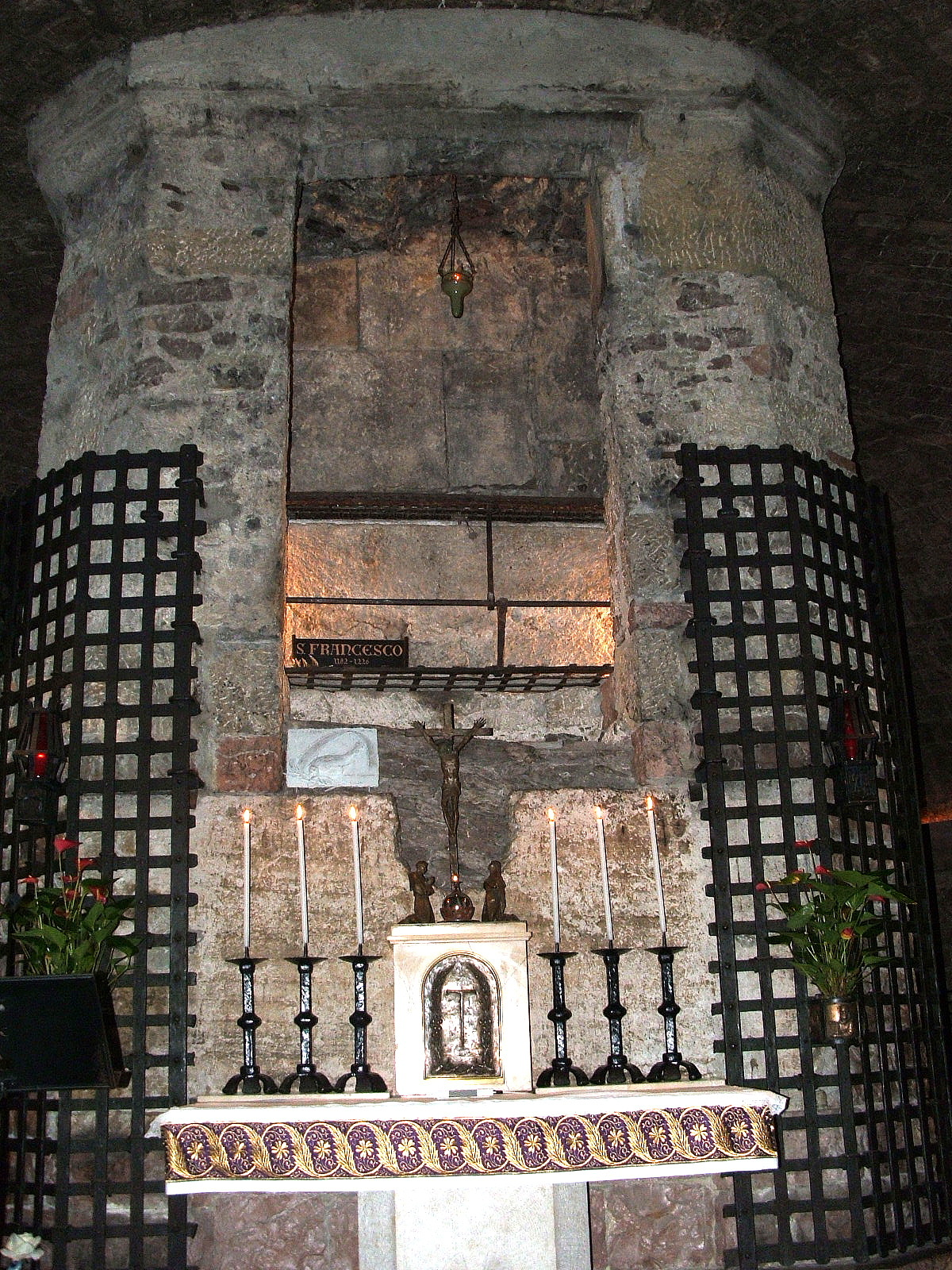
Tomb of Francis of Assisi and its altar on which the encyclical was signed

Pope Francis signed Fratelli tutti on 3 October 2020 in Assisi, at the tomb of Francis of Assisi in the eponymous basilica. After celebrating Mass in front of said tomb, Francis put the text of the encyclical "on the altar under the tomb of St. Francis and signed it". This signature marked the first time a papal encyclical was signed outside Rome. Francis's trip to Assisi was his first outside Rome since the beginning of COVID-19 pandemic, and his fourth visit to the city as pope. The conservative Spanish Catholic website InfoVaticana had leaked the original Spanish version of the encyclical on the same day despite the news embargo.

The text of the encyclical was officially published by the Vatican on 4 October 2020, the feast day of Francis of Assisi. The publication of the encyclical was preceded by a press conference the same day.

== Inspirations ==
In the encyclical, Pope Francis states that his February 2019 meeting in Abu Dhabi with Ahmad al-Tayyeb, Grand Imam of al-Azhar, during which they signed the Document on Human Fraternity, was an inspiration for the document. Besides Francis of Assisi, he also states that he has been inspired by numerous non-Catholics, including Martin Luther King, Desmond Tutu, and Mahatma Gandhi.

The notion of "neighbour" elaborated in the document is partly inspired by the interpretation of Paul Ricoeur, whom the pope quotes twice in the encyclical; the pope also quotes one of Ricoeur's thought leaders, Christian existentialist philosopher Gabriel Marcel.

== Redaction ==
Archbishop Víctor Manuel Fernández participated in the encyclical's redaction. Francis was also assisted by the Dicastery for Promoting Integral Human Development in the drafting of the encyclical.

== Language ==
The encyclical was written originally in Spanish, although the title is in Italian.

== Content ==
The encyclical calls for more human fraternity and solidarity, and is a plea to reject wars. It focuses on contemporary social and economic problems, and proposes an ideal world of fraternity in which all countries can be part of a "larger human family". The encyclical is roughly 43,000 words long, divided into 8 chapters and 287 paragraphs, and contains 288 footnotes. Most of the encyclical contains what the Pope has already said, and can be considered as a systematic, comprehensive rearrangement of the work Francis has produced during his seven-year papacy. "By incorporating past sayings from homilies, speeches and statements into an encyclical, one of the highest levels of teaching in the church, he raises their authority".

=== Racism ===
The encyclical asserts that "[r]acism is a virus that quickly mutates and, instead of disappearing, goes into hiding, and lurks in waiting". It also condemns believers who continue to "support varieties of narrow and violent nationalism, xenophobia and contempt, and even the mistreatment of those who are different".

=== Immigration ===
If every human being possesses an inalienable dignity, if all people are my brothers and sisters, and if the world truly belongs to everyone, then it matters little whether my neighbour was born in my country or elsewhere.

— Fratelli tutti, §125

Francis supports the cause of immigrants, saying: "No one, then, can remain excluded because of his or her place of birth, much less because of privileges enjoyed by others who were born in lands of greater opportunity. The limits and borders of individual states cannot stand in the way of this". He adds: "Each country also belongs to the foreigner inasmuch as a territory's goods must not be denied to a needy person coming from elsewhere". He says that migrants should also benefit from love, and quoted the USCCB's 2018 pastoral letter against racism, saying that there are some rights that "precede any society because they flow from the dignity granted to each person as created by God".

The Pope also calls for the establishment of the concept of "full citizenship" and the rejection of the discriminatory use of the expression "minorities". The pope insists that differences among people are a gift, and that the whole is more than the total of its single parts. He furthermore states that other cultures "are not 'enemies' from which we need to protect ourselves".

=== Interreligious relations ===
Percentage of Christians in the World according to a 2011 Pew Research study.

The encyclical is inspired by the Abu Dhabi declaration. In the encyclical, Pope Francis states the Abu Dhabi declaration "was no mere diplomatic gesture, but a reflection born of dialogue and common commitment". Fratelli tutti says: "we, the believers of the different religions, know that our witness to God benefits our societies" and "We Christians ask that, in those countries where we are a minority, we be guaranteed freedom, even as we ourselves promote that freedom for non-Christians in places where they are a minority".

Francis considers interreligious dialogue as a way to bring "friendship, peace and harmony", adding that without "openness to the Father of all", fraternity cannot be achieved. He adds that the foundation of modern totalitarianism is the "denial of the transcendent dignity of the human person" and that violence "has no basis in religious convictions, but rather in their deformities". According to him, however, dialogue does not involve reducing or hiding one's deepest convictions, and sincere and humble adoration of God promotes the sanctity of life.

=== Good Samaritan ===
Pope Francis reflects upon the parable of the Good Samaritan, which is the theological core of the encyclical. Pope Francis says this parable is an "ever new" call from Jesus to "rediscover our vocation as citizens of our respective nations and of the entire world, builders of a new social bond". It invites the reader to introspect their inner struggle between one's own security and personal sacrifices required by charity. The parable "speaks to us of an essential and often forgotten aspect of our common humanity: we were created for a fulfilment that can only be found in love". Pope Francis adds: "All of us have a responsibility for the wounded" and "We should not expect everything from those who govern us, for that would be childish. We have the space we need for co-responsibility in creating and putting into place new processes and changes". The Pope also urges people to "be Good Samaritans who bear the pain of other people's troubles rather than fomenting greater hatred and resentment".

In the same section, Pope Francis also criticises those who believe that worshipping God is enough and are untrue to what their faith demands of them. Also, Francis points at those who "manipulate and cheat society" and "live off" welfare. He also emphasizes the importance of recognising Jesus Christ in those who are abandoned or excluded and adds he "sometimes wonder[s] why it took so long for the Church unequivocally to condemn slavery and various forms of violence".

=== Universal fraternity ===
It is my desire that, in this our time, by acknowledging the dignity of each human person, we can contribute to the rebirth of a universal aspiration to fraternity. Fraternity between all men and women. [...] Let us dream, then, as a single human family, as fellow travellers sharing the same flesh, as children of the same earth which is our common home, each of us bringing the richness of his or her beliefs and convictions, each of us with his or her own voice, brothers and sisters all.

— Fratelli tutti, §8

In the encyclical, Francis writes that the sense of global kinship is disappearing, and that the quest for justice and peace is being replaced by a "globalized indifference".

In Fratelli tutti, Francis states that universal brotherhood is possible, but requires "a decisive commitment to devising effective means to this end" (§ 180). Furthermore, he states that isolationism, nationalism, a global economy that "promotes individual interests", a "loss of the sense of history", limitless consumption, wastefulness, the lack of concern for the environment, and a throwaway culture are hindering this end. Among other things, abortion, euthanasia, neglect of the elderly, discrimination against women, and slavery are included as part of this throwaway culture; the word "abortion" is not present in the encyclical, but its condemnation is alluded. In the encyclical, Pope Francis says: "Social friendship and universal fraternity necessarily call for an acknowledgement of the worth of every human person, always and everywhere"; Francis warns that if the human dignity of disabled people, of poor people, or of those who do not have access to education is menaced, then fraternity will be but a "vague ideal". Francis states that individualism "does not make us more free, more equal, more fraternal", and that what is needed is a "universal love" which promotes the dignity of every human being. He also says that individualist consumerism can possibly "rapidly degenerate into a free-for-all" which would be "worse than any pandemic".

=== "Liberty, equality and fraternity" ===
In the encyclical Francis uses the expression "liberty, equality, and fraternity" without explicitly referencing the French motto. He explains that "[f]raternity is born not only of a climate of respect for individual liberties, or even of a certain administratively guaranteed equality. Fraternity necessarily calls for something greater, which in turn enhances freedom and equality". He adds that liberty and equality are nothing without fraternity. Moreover, the Pope criticizes the Declaration of the Rights of Man and of the Citizen and the Universal Declaration of Human Rights for being abstract in essence, stating that equality cannot be attained by "an abstract proclamation that 'all men and women are equal'. Instead, it is the result of the conscious and careful cultivation of fraternity".

=== Dignity of women ===
In the encyclical, Pope Francis strives to ensure the situation of women globally is taken more into account; he also stated: "The organization of societies worldwide is still far from reflecting clearly that women possess the same dignity and identical rights as men".

=== Capital punishment and life imprisonment ===
Pope Francis repeats that the death penalty is "inadmissible" and that "there can be no stepping back from this position". He adds that the Catholic Church is committed to the worldwide abolition of the death penalty; he explains: "The firm rejection of the death penalty shows to what extent it is possible to recognize the inalienable dignity of every human being and to accept that he or she has a place in this universe". He also expresses opposition to life imprisonment, which he calls a "secret death penalty".

=== International politics ===
In the encyclical, Pope Francis states the way the COVID-19 pandemic was managed by world countries has shown a failure in global cooperation. In the encyclical, he calls for the development of a mid- to long-term "form of global governance" which would have the means to provide "effective assistance for integrating migrants in their receiving countries, while also promoting the development of their countries of origin through policies inspired by solidarity, yet not linking assistance to ideological strategies and practices alien or contrary to the cultures of the peoples being assisted".

Francis also calls for a reform of the United Nations to prevent it from being "delegitimized".

Francis criticizes "certain populist political regimes" that prevent migrants from entering their countries at all costs, and lead to "a xenophobic mentality". He defines good politics as politics that attempt to build communities and hear all opinions. To Francis, politics is not about "how many people endorsed me?" or "how many voted for me?", but rather about "how much love did I put into my work?" and "what real bonds did I create?"

=== Economy ===
Francis warns against selfishness in the economy, and against financial speculation which "continues to wreak havoc". For the Pope, the COVID-19 pandemic has shown that "not everything can be resolved by market freedom" and that human dignity must be put "back at the center". The Pope considers that a good economic policy is one which creates jobs, not one which removes them. He denounces the "dogma" of neoliberalism that the market by itself can resolve any problem, a dogma which repeatedly "resort[s] to the magic theories of 'spillover' or 'trickle'" to solve any societal problem.

=== Private property ===
Fratelli tutti accepts the right to property, but states that this right "can only be considered a secondary natural right" when compared to human dignity. Francis attempts to reorient the right to property as a responsibility for the care of the whole planet: "All this brings out the positive meaning of the right to property: I care for and cultivate something that I possess, in such a way that it can contribute to the good of all". He also urges that the "right to private property" be accompanied by the "prior principle" of "subordination of all private property to the universal destination of the earth's goods, and thus the right of all to their use".

=== War ===
With the money spent on weapons and other military expenditures, let us establish a global fund that can finally put an end to hunger and favour development in the most impoverished countries, so that their citizens will not resort to violent or illusory solutions, or have to leave their countries in order to seek a more dignified life.

— Fratelli tutti, §262

Francis says that wars can no longer be considered justifiable, as the risks of war exceed any supposed benefits. He believes that "it is very difficult nowadays to invoke the rational criteria elaborated in earlier centuries to speak of the possibility of a 'just war'"; Francis adds that Augustine of Hippo, "who forged a concept of 'just war' that we no longer uphold in our own day, also said that 'it is a higher glory still to stay war itself with a word, than to slay men with the sword, and to procure or maintain peace by peace, not by war'". Francis speaks of the right to defense by means of military force as a "potential right". War, nuclear weapons and terrorism are all denounced as misguided substitutes for dialogue and as means to primarily further national agendas.

=== Conclusion prayers ===
The encyclical ends with two prayers: one to the Creator that addresses God as Father, and an ecumenical Christian prayer that addresses God as the Holy Trinity.

== Reception ==
=== Politicians ===
Sviatlana Tsikhanouskaya, a Belarusian politician exiled after the 2020 presidential election, responded to the encyclical with a letter, Fraternal Society: A Vision For a New Belarus. In the letter, Tsikhanouskaya noted that "a new political community" was born in Belarus out of "the desire for unity and solidarity" as a reaction to disenfranchising citizens during the post-Soviet decades of authoritarian presidency. Reflecting on the election, she referred to the Good Samaritan parable central to encyclical, comparing the Belarusian people to the robbed and wounded traveller. She praised the laity and clergy of Belarusian churches who answered with "prayer, mercy, and the raising of their voices against violence and lawlessness". In her conclusion, Tsikhanouskaya challenged the Pope for guidance for the peaceful protesters facing continuous violence from the government.

=== Journalists ===
Our Sunday Visitor describes the encyclical as "a papal plea to care for our fellow man", in the same way as the previous encyclical Laudato si' is "a papal plea to care for our common home".

John L. Allen Jr. of Crux compares Fratelli tutti to Pius XI's 1931 encyclical Quadragesimo anno based on similarities he sees between the political and economic contexts in which both encyclicals were released and the solutions they provided.

According to Eduardo Campos Lima of Crux, many Brazilians were surprised and delighted by the use of Pope Francis of a quote from the song Samba da Benção of Vinicius de Moraes in the encyclical.

=== Catholic Church ===
The head of the Jesuit Institute School of Spirituality in South Africa, Catholic laywoman Dr. Annemarie Paulin-Campbell, criticizes the content of the encyclical, its title which she believes made it difficult for woman to feel included (although, she says, "'Fratelli' is meant to communicate brothers and sisters or siblings"), and its frequent use of the word "fraternity" which she says "carries strongly masculine connotations". She stated that the encyclical addressed many social issues, but did not address problems which particularly concern women, such as "gender-based violence" and she said that the Catholic Church "does not accord women the same dignity and identical rights as men". Nevertheless, she said that despite her "critique of 'Fratelli Tutti' in relation to women, it is well worth reading because it gives a sense of the many areas in which we are struggling in contemporary society".

Fr. James J. Martin SJ praises the encyclical, for he says the encyclical "ratifies a change in church teaching" because it declares the death penalty "inadmissible" and states that Catholics should work to abolish it.

Thomas Petri, dean of the Pontifical Faculty of the Immaculate Conception, considers that the 2018 change of the Catechism and Fratelli tutti which both declare capital punishment "inadmissible" means that the death penalty is in itself admissible since the Pope did not qualify death penalty as "intrinsically evil". Petri believes that if a pope was to deny the admissibility in itself of death penalty, it would constitute a "rupture" with the previous teachings of the Catholic Church.

Bishop José Horacio Gómez, president of the U.S. Conference of Catholic Bishops, says the encyclical proposes a challenge "to overcome the individualism in our culture and to serve our neighbors in love". Simone Campbell says the encyclical's message is: "We must move beyond continuous divisiveness and come together to build a world worthy of all God’s children".

On 1 December 2020, the Dicastery for Promoting Integral Human Development (DPIHD), with the help of the Dicastery for Communication, has released a section of the DPIHD's website dedicated to the encyclical.

=== Other religions ===
Grand Imam of Al-Azhar Ahmad al-Tayyeb says the encyclical "is an extension of the Document on Human Fraternity, and reveals a global reality in which the vulnerable and marginalized pay the price for unstable positions and decisions. It is a message that is directed to people of good will, whose consciences are alive and restores to humanity consciousness".

=== Freemasons ===
Through its communication organ El Oriente, the Grand Lodge of Spain praises the encyclical, saying that it shows "how far the current Catholic Church is from its former position. In 'Fratelli Tutti', the Pope embraces Universal Fraternity, the great principle of modern Masonry". The lodge also praises the fact that Francis addresses "the disintegrating role of the digital world, whose operation favors closed circuits of people who think the same way and facilitate the spread of fake news that encourage prejudice and hatred".

The Grand Orient of Italy wrote in its official magazine Erasmo to praise the encyclical, saying the "idea of universal brotherhood as a bond that unites all human beings, regardless of their faith, ideology, color, skin, social background, language, culture and nation" expressed in the Fratelli tutti are "close to the ideals that have been the very foundations of Freemasonry from the very beginning".

== Legacy ==
Pope Francis participated in a virtual observance of the International Day of Human Fraternity on 4 February 2021 along with Grand Imam of Al-Azhar Ahmad al-Tayyeb, a new celebration founded on 21 December 2020 by the United Nations and which may have been influenced by Fratelli tutti.

On 20 May 2021, the Fratelli Tutti Political School was created. This school is an online school of political thought, with its headquarters in the San Calisto palace of Vatican City. The school is managed by Juan Ignacio Maquieyra and will dispense online courses which will last 12 to 18 months each. Young people from all around the world can enrol for free in the school, but the enrolment is subject to a selection process.

On 21 October 2021, the Fratelli tutti foundation was created. The foundation aims to promote justice, solidarity and the common good.

In July 2022, Taiwan organised an art exhibition titled "Friendly Taiwan meets Fratelli tutti" to celebrate the 80 years of diplomatic relationship between Taiwan and the Holy See.
