= Capital punishment in Vatican City =

Capital punishment in Vatican City was legal between 1929 and 1969, reserved for attempted assassination of the Pope, but has never been applied there. Executions were carried out elsewhere in the Papal States, which was the predecessor of the Vatican City, during their existence.

== Background ==
As Vatican City is a sacerdotal-monarchical state ruled by the Pope, who is the bishop of Rome and head of the Catholic Church, its laws are influenced by Church teaching.

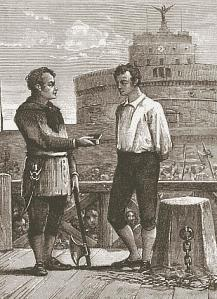
Giovanni Battista Bugatti, executioner of the Papal States between 1796 and 1865, carried out 516 executions (Bugatti pictured offering snuff to a condemned prisoner in front of Castel Sant'Angelo).

The moral liceity of the death penalty had support from early Catholic theologians, though some of them such as Saint Ambrose encouraged members of the clergy not to pronounce or carry out capital punishment. Saint Augustine answered objections to capital punishment rooted in the first commandment in The City of God. Augustine's argument is as such: "Since the agent of authority is but a sword in the hand [of God], it is in no way contrary to the commandment 'Thou shalt not kill' for the representative of the state's authority to put criminals to death". Thomas Aquinas and Duns Scotus argued that civil authority to carry out capital punishment was supported by scripture.

The Roman Catechism (1566) codified the teaching that God had entrusted civil authorities with the power over life and death.

During the Middle Ages and into the modern period, the Inquisition was authorized by the Holy See to turn over heretics to secular authority for execution, and the Papal States carried out executions for a variety of offences.

Over the 20th and 21st centuries the Church has clarified that the death penalty should only be handed out when and where it is necessary to protect society. Since 2018, the Church officially teaches that the death penalty is not necessary and is therefore inadmissible.

== History of the Statute ==
The Lateran Treaty of 1929 copied from the contemporaneous Italian legal code (concerning attempted assassinations of the King of Italy), providing for capital punishment for anyone who attempted to assassinate the pope within Vatican City. Article 8 of the Lateran Treaty provides:

Considering the person of the Supreme Pontiff to be sacred and inviolable, Italy declares any attempt against His person or any incitement to commit such attempt to be punishable by the same penalties as all similar attempts and incitements to commit the same against the person of the King.

All offences or public insults committed within Italian territory against the person of the Supreme Pontiff, whether by means of speeches, acts, or writings, shall be punished in the same manner as offences and insults against the person of the King.

There were no attempted assassinations of the pope within Vatican City while the statute was in force. It was already repealed by 1981, when Mehmet Ali Ağca attempted to assassinate Pope John Paul II, and in any case Ağca was tried by an Italian court rather than in the Vatican.

== Abolition ==
Pope Paul VI removed the capital punishment statute from the "fundamental law" of Vatican City in 1969, along with other adaptations, four years after closing the Second Vatican Council, announcing the change only in the August 1969 issue of the Gazette, which is published in Latin. The change came to public attention only in January 1971 after reporters had accused Paul VI of hypocrisy for his criticisms of planned executions in Spain and the Soviet Union.

== See also ==
- List of people executed in the Papal States
