= Giovanni Battista Bugatti =

Italian executioner (1779–1869)

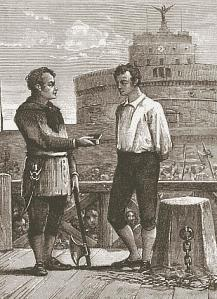
- Bugatti (left) offering snuff to a condemned prisoner before killing him (19th-century image).
- Born: 6 March 1779; Senigallia, Papal States
- Died: 18 June 1869 (aged 90); Senigallia, Kingdom of Italy
- Term: 22 March 1796 – 17 August 1864 (68 years, 148 days)

Giovanni Battista Bugatti (6 March 1779 – 18 June 1869) was the official executioner for the Papal States from 1796 to 1865, during which he carried out 516 executions under six popes and the French government before being succeeded by his assistant Vincenzo Balducci. The list of people he executed ranged from thieves to assassins using methods such as beating, beheading, or hanging.

== Personal life ==
Giovanni Battista Bugatti was born in Senigallia, on 6 March 1779. Bugatti was married, but had no children. Outside his functions as executioner, he worked as an umbrella maker. He died in Senigallia on 18 June 1869. A book that claimed to be his memoir was published in 1891.

== Career ==
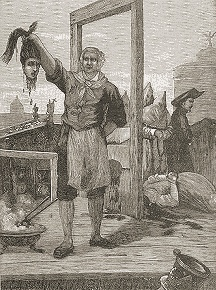
Giovanni Battista Bugatti holding the head of an executed woman

Bugatti became the official executioner for the Papal States at the age of 17 in 1796, and served until 1865. His tenure was overseen by the popes Pius VI, Pius VII, Leo XII, Pius VIII, Gregory XVI, and Pius IX. He also performed executions during the French occupation of the Papal States. He offered snuff to those who were about to be executed.

At the Via dei Cerchi Bugatti executed 516 people with methods such as decapitation with an axe or guillotine, slicing their throats, or being drawn and quartered. Bugatti's first execution was of Nicola Gentilucci, who was hanged and quartered in Foligno on 22 March 1796, after killing a priest and coachman and robbing two friars. The last person he executed was Domenico Antonio Demartini, conducted on 17 August 1861, for murder.

Between 28 February 1810, and 28 December 1813, Bugatti beheaded 56 people using the guillotine. Giuseppe Franconi, who was executed on 23 January 1826, was the last person Bugatti beat to death. One man was hanged, quartered, and beheaded before having his body burned on 27 February 1800, for stealing two ciboria. Domenico Capolei was executed on 2 May 1857, for killing the governor of Marino. Antonio De Felici was executed on 11 July 1855, for attempting to assassinate Cardinal Secretary of State Giacomo Antonelli.

Bugatti was not allowed to leave the Vatican except for official business; the payment for each execution was three cents of the Roman Lira. He was given a residence in Borgo and a pension after his retirement. He was given the nickname Mastro Titta, a slurred version of maestro di Giustizia (master of justice).

Vincenzo Balducci, Bugatti's assistant since 1850, succeeded him as executioner and served until 1870. Balducci executed twelve people.

== In popular culture ==
Charles Dickens wrote about Bugatti in Pictures from Italy after watching one of his executions in 1845. Depictions of Bugatti show him as tall, but he was short in real life. A nursery rhyme about him goes:

Slice, slice, Mastro Titta
A loaf of bread and salami.
One for me, one for thee,
One for Mama, that makes three.

== See also ==
- Capital punishment in Vatican City
- Capital punishment in Italy

== Works cited ==
=== Books ===
- Ademollo, A. (1886). Le Annotazioni Di Mastro Titta Carnefice Romano: Supplizi e Suppliziati Giustizie Eseguite Da Gio. Batt. Bugati e Dal Suo Succexssore (1796-1870). S. Lapi Tipografo Editore.
- Allen, Bruce (2018). Tiber: Eternal River of Rome. University Press of New England. ISBN 9781512603347.
- Cucchi, Maurizio (2013). L'Indifferenza Dell'Assassino. Arnoldo Mondadori Editore. ISBN 9788860886941.
- Hart, David (2020). Theological Territories: A David Bentley Hart Digest. University of Notre Dame Press. doi:10.2307/j.ctv19m638q. ISBN 9780268107208. JSTOR j.ctv19m638q.
- O'Grady, Desmond (1999). Rome Reshaped: Jubilees 1300 - 2000. Continuum International Publishing Group. ISBN 082641205X.
- Rutler, George (2016). He Spoke to Us: Discerning God in People and Events. Ignatius Press. ISBN 9781586179830.

=== News ===
- Allen, John (14 September 2001). "He executed justice". National Catholic Reporter. Archived from the original on 19 February 2025.

=== Web ===
- "Notice de personne". Bibliothèque nationale de France. Archived from the original on 11 July 2025.
