= Cerchi family =

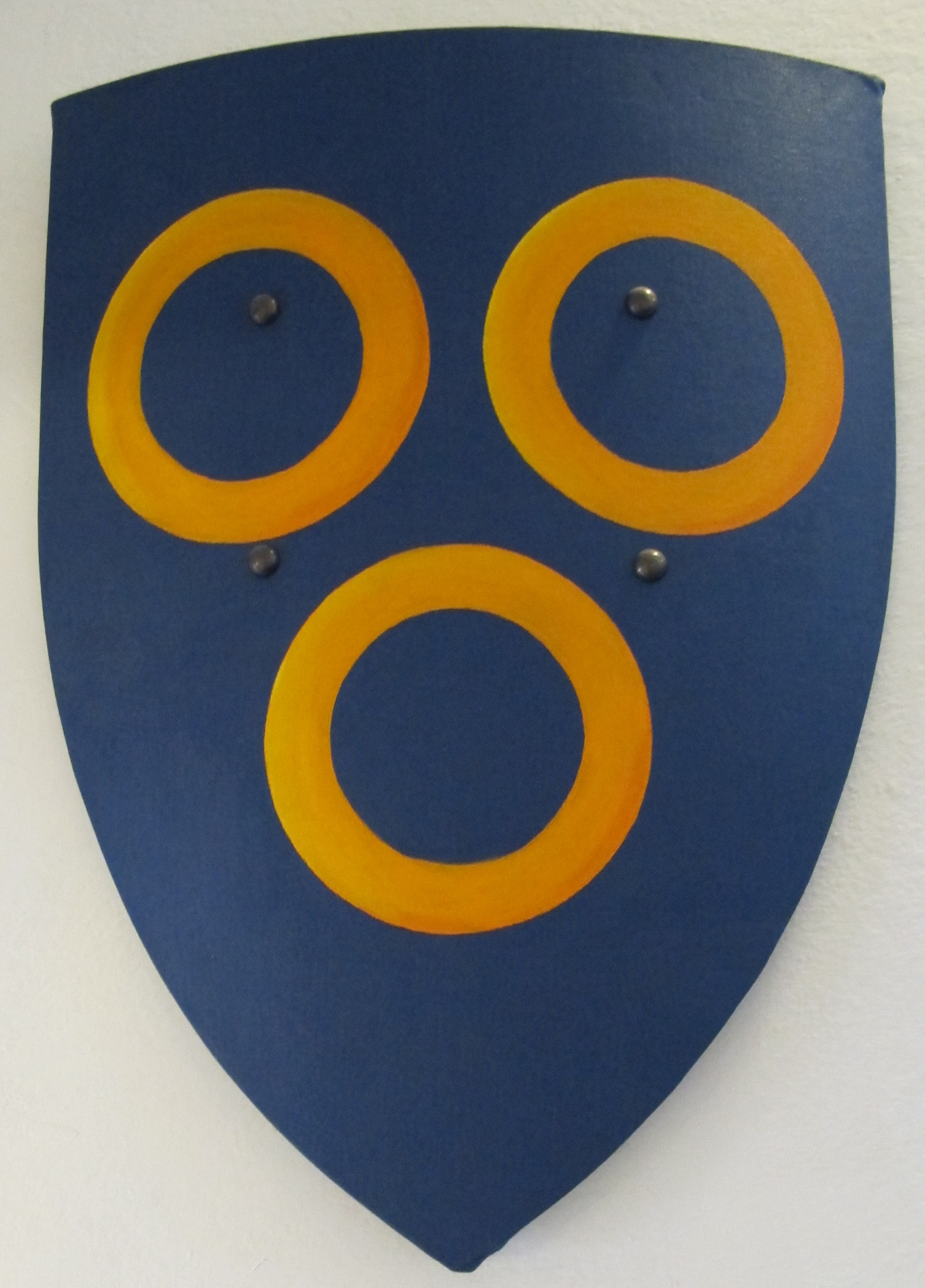
Cerchi coat of arms

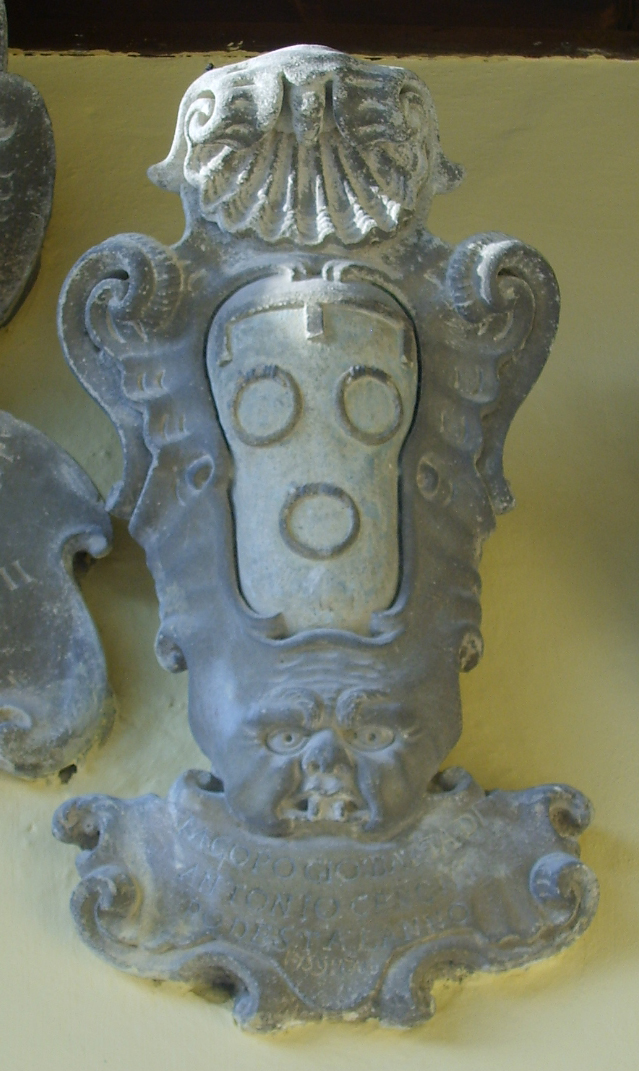

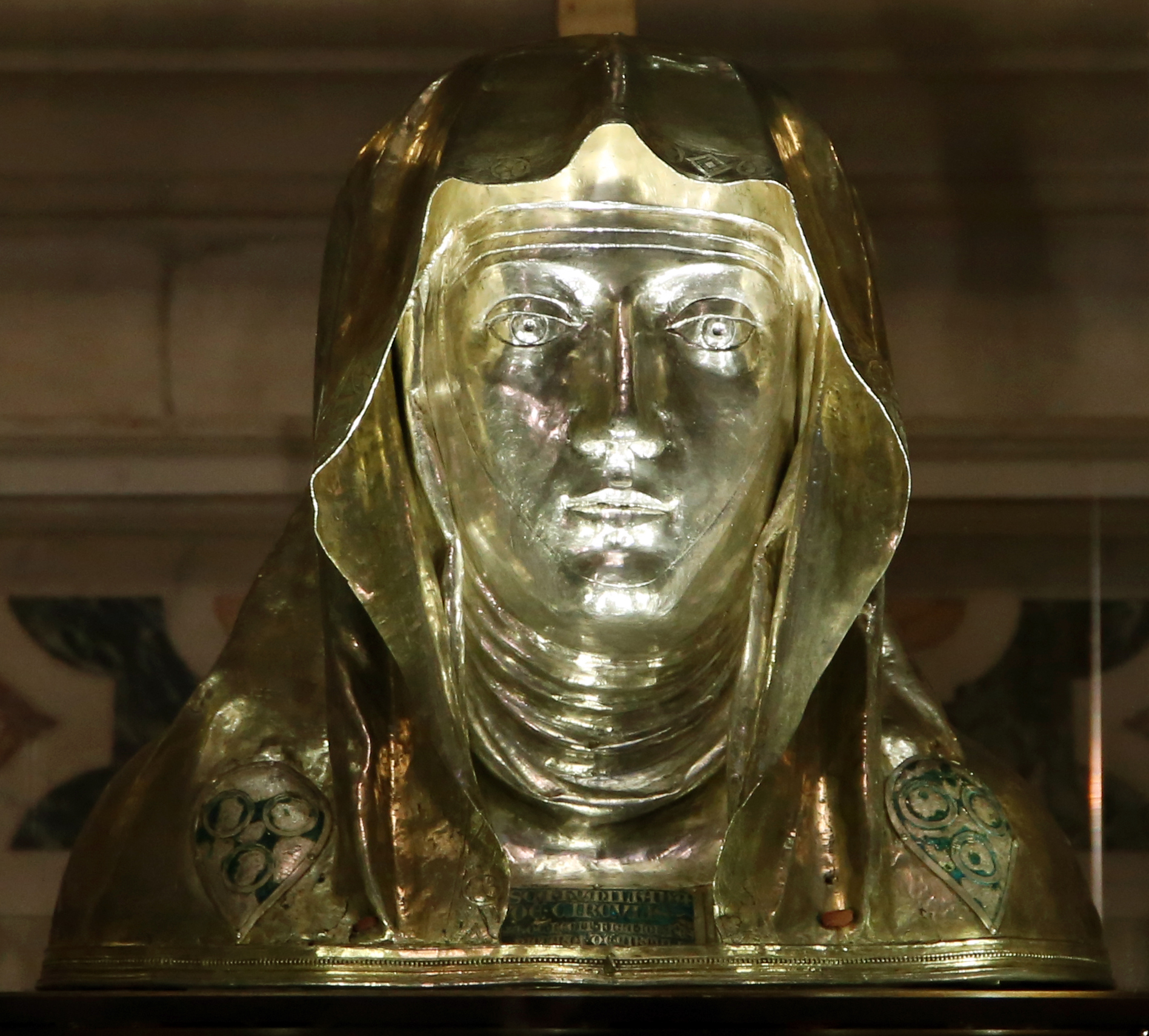
Reliquary bust of Blessed Umiliana de 'Cerchi

The Florentine banking family of the Cerchi, minor nobles of the Valdarno, with a seat especially at Acone near Pontassieve, settled in Florence in the early thirteenth century and increased their fortunes. The family became the heads of a consortium of the prominent Guelphs that securely controlled Florence after the battle of Benevento in 1266. In Florence, the Cerchi purchased some of the ancient structures in the closely packed inner city formerly belonging to the counts Guidi, cheek-by-jowl with the proud Florentine family of the Donati, with whom their growing mutual antagonism was expressed in violent episodes that polarized Florence within a couple of decades in a virtual civil war that aligned behind two captains, Corso Donati of the Neri Guelph faction— the "Black" Guelphs of the old noble oligarchy— and Vieri de' Cerchi of the Bianchi, the moderate party that represented itself as champions of working people (the magri). The resulting violence lasted, with irruptions of tranquility, into the fourteenth century.

In 1289 a plot had been intercepted at Arezzo, by which the city's bishop agreed to give over to the Florentines Bibbiena Civitella, and all the villages of his see, in return for a life annuity of 5,000 golden florins a year, guaranteed by the bank of the Cerchi. These rumors led to the confrontation of Guelphs and Ghibellines at the Battle of Campaldino, 11 June 1289, in which the young Dante Alighieri took part and Vieri dei Cerchi lost his life.

In the popular uprising of 2 May 1299, the podestà Corso Donati was expelled, and with him the Donati faction. The Cerchi faction prevailed. In May the following year a brawl between Donati and Cerchi erupted, in which one of the Cerchi had his nose slit, but plots to restore Donati, who had become podestà of Orvieto, were unsuccessful. Matters were complicated when Pope Boniface VIII sent Charles de Valois, brother of the King of France to restore peace between Bianchi and Neri. He favoured the Neri: Dante, who had married Gemma Donati, was among those Bianchi dispossessed and banished in 1302, and marked Boniface as destined for the eighth circle of Hell in his Inferno.

In Florence, the house of the Alighieri was a few hundred paces from the cluster of tower houses of the Cerchi, which were restructured in the fourteenth century to form a rambling Palazzo dei Cerchi in the isolated block (insula) fronting via dei Cimatori and via della Condotta behind Piazza della Signoria. This was the power center of the Cerchi: their church was the little Santa Margherita dei Cerchi of which the arms of the patrons, Cerchi, Adimari and Donati, may still be seen on its thirteenth-century doorway. This was the church of Dante's Beatrice Portinari.

The Palazzo, now renovated, has been the home of the study abroad program for Kent State University since 2003.

Another palazzo dei Cerchi, facing into Piazza di Santa Croce, was entirely rebuilt in the seventeenth century as the Palazzo dell'Antella.

The public charity and personal piety of Blessed Umiliana de' Cerchi (c. 1219-19 May 1246) became the object of a popular cult in Florence immediately after her death; it resulted in her beatification in 1634.
