= Interfaith worship spaces =

Building hosting worship services from two or more religions

Interfaith worship spaces are buildings that are home to congregations representing two (or more) religions. Buildings shared by churches of two Christian denominations are common, but there are only a few known places where, for example, a Jewish congregation and a Christian congregation share their home.

Such buildings are of interest as concrete ventures in the interfaith understanding which many religious groups now espouse. Unitarian Universalist churches hold interfaith services.

There are several cases in North America where a small congregation of one faith is a tenant in a building owned and chiefly occupied by a congregation of another faith.

Buildings that were planned and erected as joint projects include:

- Church for the Fellowship of All Peoples, perhaps the first interfaith space, was founded in 1944 by a former Baptist minister. A Muslim imam may lead a service and sermons may involve Hinduism or Judaism.
- Omaha, Nebraska, The Tri-Faith Commons is the only place of its kind in the world. It brings together a synagogue, church, mosque, and interfaith center on 38-acres in the American heartland of Omaha, Nebraska. Leadership from three institutions, Temple Israel, the Episcopal Diocese of Nebraska and the American Institute of Islamic Studies and Culture (now the American Muslim Institute), began to meet regularly.
- Ann Arbor, Michigan, St. Clare of Assisi Episcopal church and Temple Beth Emeth share a building called Genesis of Ann Arbor.
- Waterloo, Ontario, Westminster United Church and Temple Shalom share The Cedars Worship and Community Centre.
- Columbia, Maryland, (a planned community originally developed by the Rouse Company), five Interfaith Centers have been built, the first in 1970, and another is planned.
- Derry, New Hampshire, The Church of the Transfiguration, Episcopal, and the Etz Hayim Synagogue began as a landlord/tenant relationship, but expanded in 2009 to become the Derry Interfaith Campus.
- House of One
- House of Religions
- The Abrahamic Family House is an interfaith complex in Abu Dhabi, comprising the St. Francis of Assisi Church, Imam Al-Tayeb Mosque and Moses Ben Maimon Synagogue in separate structures. It was inspired by the Document on Human Fraternity and announced in 2019, and designed by Adjaye Associates to serve as a community for inter-religious dialogue, exchange, and worship. It was inaugurated in February 2023. The complex seeks to represent interfaith co-existence, preserve the unique character of the religions represented, and build bridges between human civilization and the Abrahamic messages. It was commissioned by the Higher Committee of Human Fraternity.

Heathrow Airport has multi-faith prayer rooms in all 5 of its terminals.
