= Moses Ben Maimon Synagogue =

Synagogue In Abu Dhabi

- Arabic: كنيس موسى بن ميمون; Hebrew: בית הכנסת משה בן מימון
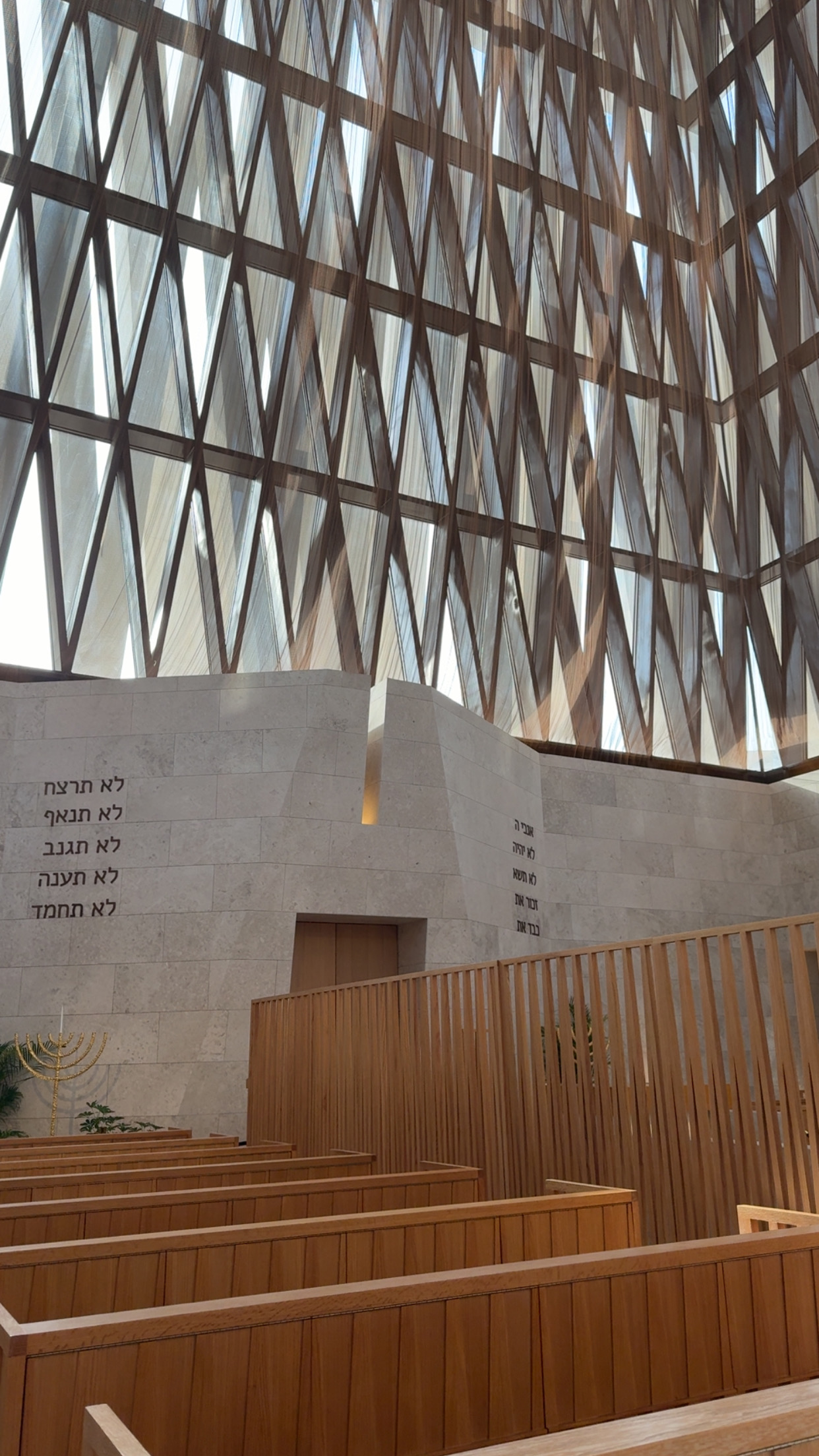
- Interior of the Moses Ben Maimon Synagogue

- Location within United Arab Emirates

Religion
- Affiliation: Judaism
- Rite: Sephardic
- Leadership: Yehuda Sarna (chief rabbi)

Location
- Location: Abrahamic Family House, Cultural District, Al Saadiyat Island, Abu Dhabi
- Coordinates: 24.530933°N 54.406101°E

Architecture
- Architect: David Adjaye
- Completed: 2023

The Moses Ben Maimon Synagogue (Arabic: كنيس موسى بن ميمون; Hebrew: בית הכנסת משה בן מימון) is a synagogue located in Abu Dhabi, United Arab Emirates within the Abrahamic Family House interfaith complex alongside a mosque and a Catholic church. The synagogue was officially opened on 16 February 2023 and is named after the 12th century Jewish philosopher Moses ben Maimon. It is the first public synagogue in the United Arab Emirates.

== History ==
The idea for the Abrahamic Family House, which includes the Imam Al-Tayeb Mosque, was announced on 5 February 2019 by Sheikh Abdullah bin Zayed, the Minister of Foreign Affairs and International Co-operation, during a meeting of the Higher Committee of Human Fraternity at the New York Public Library. The goal of the Abrahamic Family House is to promote interfaith understanding and dialogue between different religions. The synagogue is named after the 12th-century Jewish scholar, physician and astronomer Moses Ben Maimon (commonly known as Maimonides), who lived in Morocco and Egypt. He was one of the most prolific and influential Torah scholars of the Middle Ages and was a doctor by profession. Maimonides was born in Córdoba, Spain, in 1135 and spent 12 years travelling before settling in Cairo, where he lived for the rest of his life, teaching and writing about Judaism. He died in Cairo in 1204.

The opening ceremony of the Moses Ben Maimon Synagogue was attended by members of the Jewish community in Abu Dhabi, as well as government officials and other religious leaders. Rabbi Yehuda Sarna, the chief rabbi of the Moses Ben Maimon Synagogue, opened the event and cCntor Alex Peterfreund led the congregants through a series of verses. Sarna then invited Rabbi Levi Duchman, the first resident rabbi of the United Arab Emirates and head of Chabad in the UAE, to recite a Jewish prayer in Hebrew for the leaders and government of the UAE. The same prayer was also delivered in Arabic by Rabbi Yosef Hamdi, the leader of the small Jewish Yemenite community in Abu Dhabi that was rescued two years earlier by the Emirati government.

== Architecture ==
The synagogue's design by Sir David Adjaye is a modern interpretation of traditional Jewish architecture. The building features a crisscross diagrid façade and soffit, which represents the palm trees used to build a Sukkah. The Sukkah is a temporary shelter used during the Jewish festival of Sukkot. The structure provides protection from the sun and allows the stars to be seen at night.

The Moses Ben Maimon Synagogue has seven pillars on the ground and eight above supporting the roof. The metallic bronze structure, emanating natural light and shaped like a curtain, hovers up by the roof. The zig-zag shapes of the structure are similar to tents and represent Jewish communities of old congregating to practise their religion. The bronze chainmail represents the tent-like structure of the Sukkah, and the skylight references a chuppah, a temporary structure used during Jewish marriages for the couple to stand under fabric beneath a sea of stars.

The interior of the Moses Ben Maimon Synagogue is decorated with traditional Jewish symbols and features. The Ten Commandments are printed in Hebrew and flank the walls of the prayer hall. The synagogue also includes a mikveh, a bath used for the purpose of ritual immersion, which is located outside the prayer hall. There is also a smaller space for religious studies.

== See also ==
- Abrahamic Family House
- Document on Human Fraternity
