= Imam Al-Tayeb Mosque =

Mosque in Abu Dhabi, United Arab Emirates

- مسجد الإمام الطيب
- Pillars of the mosque

- Location within United Arab Emirates

Religion
- Affiliation: Sunni Islam
- Deity: Allah

Location
- Location: Abrahamic Family House, Cultural District, Al Saadiyat Island, Abu Dhabi
- Country: United Arab Emirates
- Coordinates: 24.530933°N 54.406101°E

Architecture
- Architect: David Adjaye
- Type: Mosque
- Groundbreaking: 2019
- Completed: 2023
- Capacity: 300

Website
- بيت العائلة الإبراهيمية

The Imam Al-Tayeb Mosque (Arabic: مسجد الإمام الطيب), is located in Abu Dhabi, United Arab Emirates within the Abrahamic Family House interfaith complex alongside a synagogue and a Catholic church. It was inaugurated on 16 February 2023. The mosque is named after the Grand Imam of Al-Azhar, Ahmed El-Tayeb.

== History ==
The idea for the Abrahamic Family House, which includes the Imam Al-Tayeb Mosque, was announced on February 5, 2019, by Sheikh Abdullah bin Zayed, the Minister of Foreign Affairs and International Co-operation, during a meeting of the Higher Committee of Human Fraternity at the New York Public Library. The goal of the Abrahamic Family House is to promote interfaith understanding and dialogue between different religions.

The mosque is named after Ahmed el-Tayeb, the Grand Imam of Al-Azhar. El-Tayeb is known for his efforts to promote interfaith dialogue and peaceful coexistence between different religions.

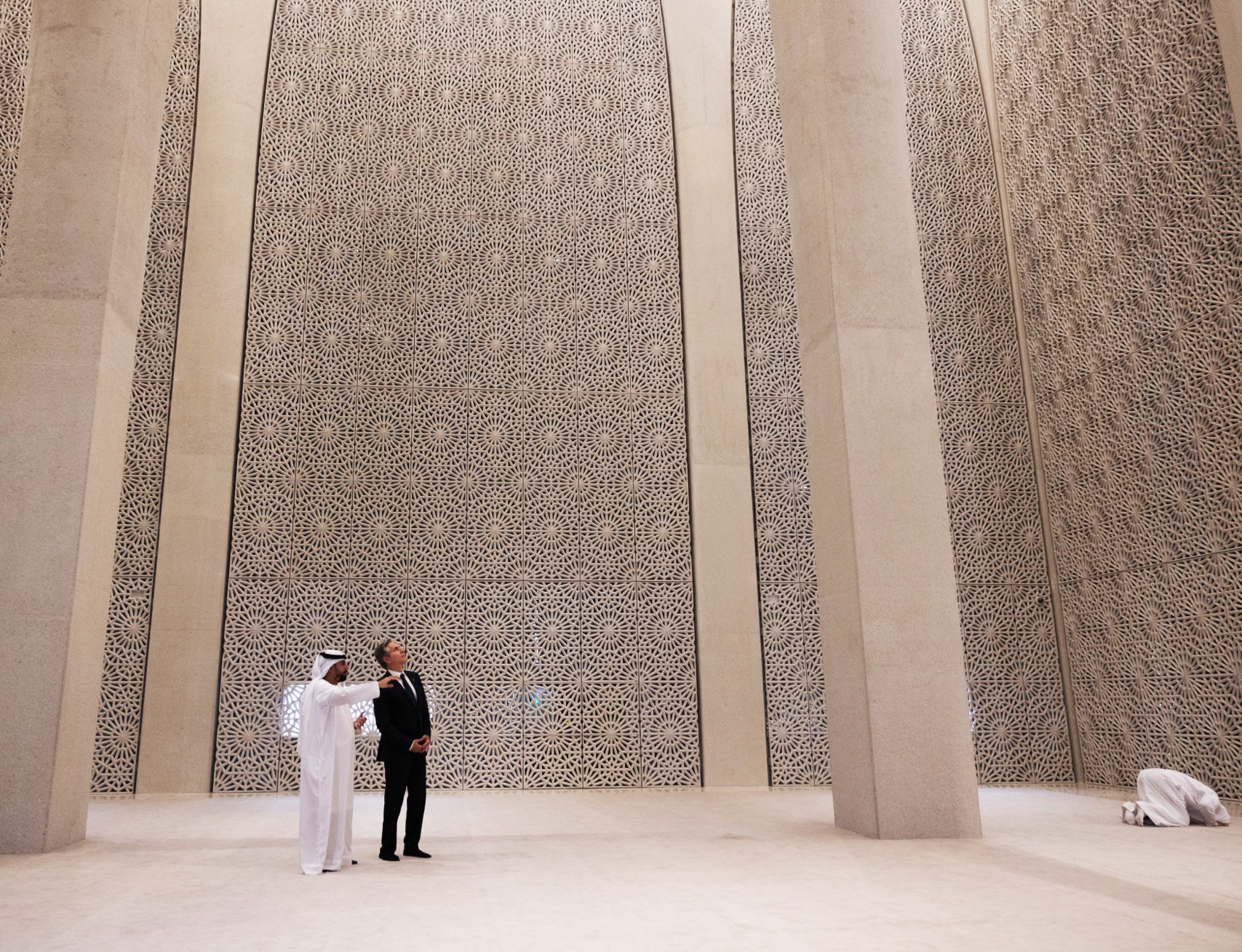
Secretary Blinken Tours the Imam Al-Tayeb Mosque at the Abrahamic Family House

The mosque was inaugurated on 16 February 2023 and the inaugural Friday prayer was held at Imam Al-Tayeb Mosque on 17 February 2023, marking the first time the community was welcomed inside one of the three houses of worship.

== Architecture ==
The mosque size is 1,322 square metres. The mosque's exterior is characterized by seven arches, which reflect the significance of the number seven in Islam. The mosque's design incorporates Islamic geometric designs throughout the structure, with a mashrabiya screen made up of more than 470 operable panels that regulate light and air while preserving the privacy of those inside.

The interior of the mosque features nine ascending vaults, each rising to form a sail vault at their apex. There are 322 prayer spots and the mosque is oriented towards Mecca. The mosque has gray carpeting and has two microphones beneath the floor and one above on the minbar, where the imam stands for Friday prayers. 470 moveable panels made of fiberglass-reinforced plastic help separate the men's and women's sections and serve as decorative elements. Two spaces accommodate washrooms for females and males.

== See also ==
- Abrahamic Family House
- Document on Human Fraternity
