= Adjaye =

Adjaye is a surname. Notable people with the surname include:

- David Adjaye (born 1966), Ghanaian-British architect
- Ed Asafu-Adjaye (born 1988), English footballer
- Edward Asafu-Adjaye (1903–1976), Ghanaian political figure, lawyer, and diplomat
- James Adjaye (born 1964), Ghanaian-British genetic scientist
