= St. Francis Church, Abu Dhabi =

Church in Abu Dhabi

St. Francis Church
- His Holiness Francis Church
- كنيسة القديس فرنسيس
- Pillars of the church
- St. Francis Church
- 24.530933°N 54.406101°E
- Location: Abrahamic Family House, Cultural District, Al Saadiyat Island, Abu Dhabi.
- Country: United Arab Emirates
- Denomination: Catholic Church
- Sui iuris church: Latin Church
- Website: www.abrahamicfamilyhouse.ae

History
- Founded: 2023; 3 years ago

Architecture
- Groundbreaking: 2019; 7 years ago
- Completed: 2023; 3 years ago

Administration
- Diocese: Apostolic Vicariate of Southern Arabia
- Deanery: United Arab Emirates

Clergy
- Bishop(s): Msgr. Paolo Martinelli, OFM Cap.

St. Francis Church (Arabic: كنيسة القديس فرنسيس) is a church on Saadiyat Island in Abu Dhabi, United Arab Emirates. The church is part of the Abrahamic Family House, an interfaith complex that includes a mosque, a synagogue, and a church, built with the aim of promoting interfaith dialogue. The church is named after St. Francis of Assisi and was inaugurated 16 February 2023. Although a Catholic church, it is open to all denominations.

== History ==
The St. Francis Church was built as part of the Abrahamic Family House project which was announced in 2019 with aims to promote interfaith harmony and understanding among the followers of the Abrahamic religions. The church is Catholic but open to all denominations.

It was officially inaugurated on 16 February 2023 by Lt. General Sheikh Saif bin Zayed Al Nahyan, Deputy Prime Minister and Minister of the Interior, and Sheikh Nahyan bin Mubarak Al Nahyan, Minister of Tolerance and Coexistence.

On 19 February 2023, a solemn thanksgiving prayer service was conducted at the St. Francis Church, which was the first prayer service held at the Church. Cardinal Michael L. Fitzgerald, the representative of Pope Francis, delivered his address at the ceremony. Msgr. Yoannis Lahzi Gaid, a member of the Higher Committee of Human Fraternity, welcomed everyone at the church. Bishop Paolo Martinelli, the Apostolic Vicar of Southern Arabia, Bishop Paul Hinder, the Apostolic Vicar Emeritus, and Msgr. Kryspin Dubiel, the Charge D'Affaires of the Apostolic Nunciature in the United Arab Emirates and other dignitaries, clergy and lay representatives were present.

== Architecture ==
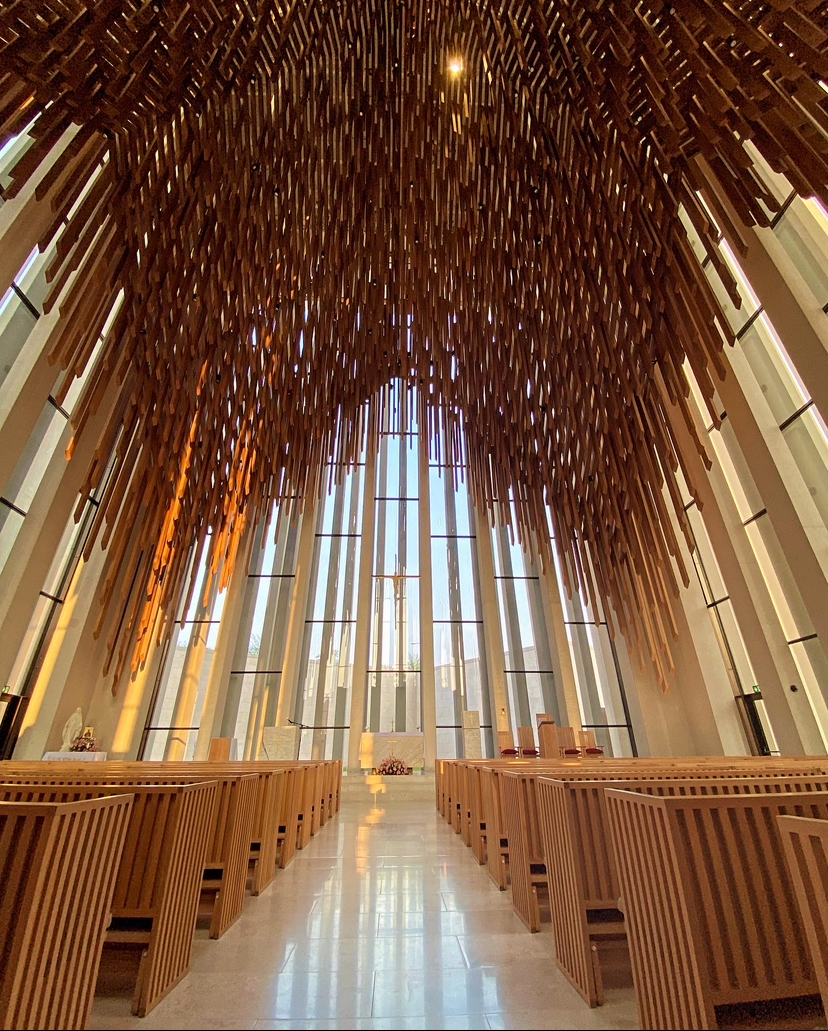
Interior of St. Francis Church

Like the other two houses of worship on the complex, the church is designed at the same height and dimensions. It is a cube-shaped building 30 meters per side. The church faces the direction of the rising sun, as light is considered symbolic of divinity. Its forest of columns is orientated in this direction to maximize the eastern light and emphasizes verticality to express the concepts of incarnation (or descent) and resurrection (or ascent) that are central to the Christian faith. The timber battens are inspired by rays of light and reference the altar at St. Peter's Basilica in the Vatican. More than 13,000 linear metres of timber form the church's vaulting.

The church can accommodate more than 300 worshippers and is open to all denominations.

== See also ==
- Document on Human Fraternity
