= Saadiyat Island =

Island in Abu Dhabi, United Arab Emirates

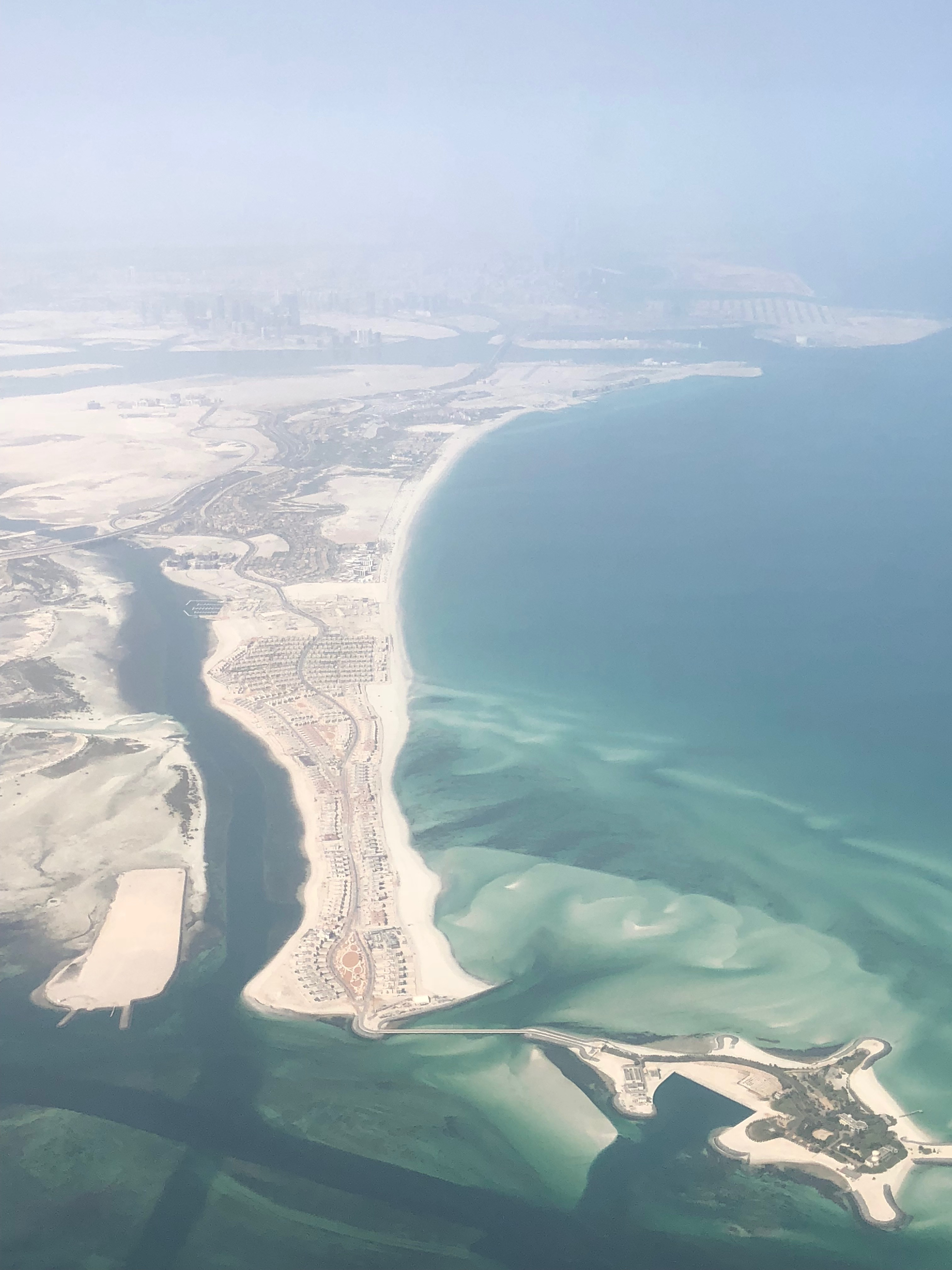
- The eastern side of Saadiyat Island, showing Hidd Al Saadiyat and Eco Island from the air.
- Interactive map of Saadiyat Island

Geography
- Coordinates: 24°31′54″N 54°26′35″E

Administration
- United Arab Emirates

Saadiyat Island (Arabic: جزيرة السعديات; jazīrat as-saʿdiyyāt, for "Island of Happiness") is a natural island and a tourism-cultural environmentally friendly project for Emirati heritage and culture that is located in Abu Dhabi, United Arab Emirates. The project is located in a large, low-lying island, 500 metres (1,600 ft) off the coast of Abu Dhabi island. A mixed commercial, residential, and leisure project is currently under construction on the island. When completed, Saadiyat Island is expected to become Abu Dhabi's cultural centre, anchored by the Saadiyat Cultural District, which groups major museums, galleries and cultural institutions.

The island is five-minute drive away from downtown Abu Dhabi, 20 minutes from Abu Dhabi International Airport, and one hour from Dubai.

== Development ==
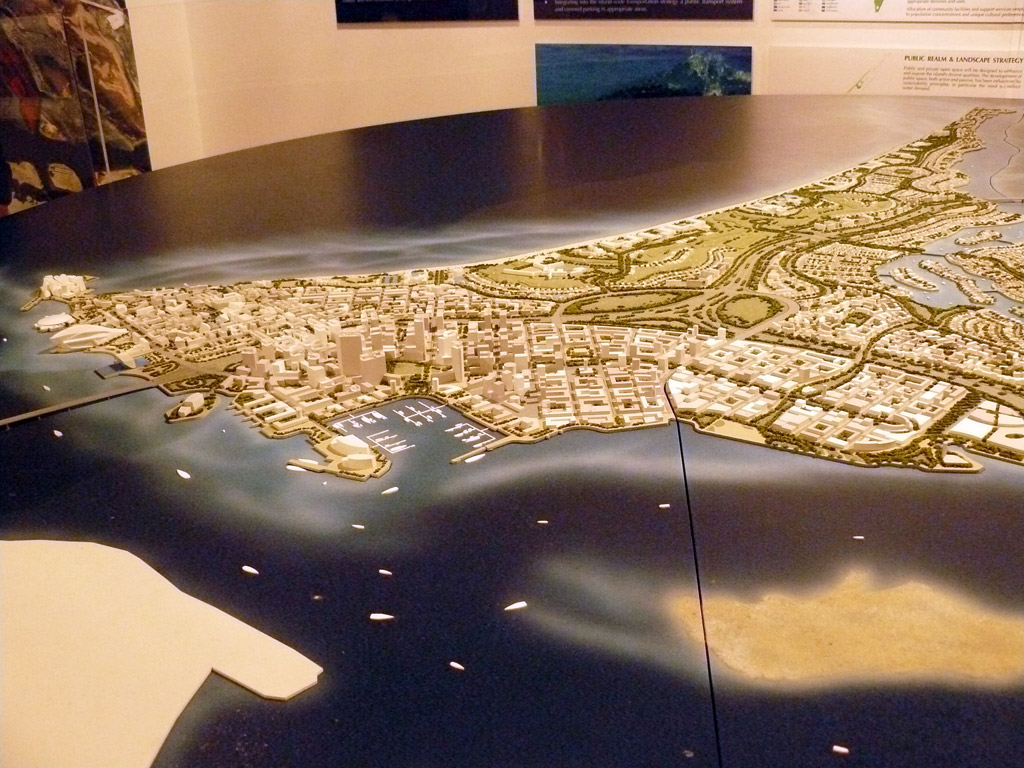
Scale model of Saadiyat Island development.

The project is being developed by the Abu Dhabi Tourism Authority-held Tourism Development & Investment Company (TDIC). The company plans to dispose of development to private investors that will work on their sites in accordance with the master plan as well as other ground rules. The plan for Saadiyat Island was developed by EDAW and continued under AECOM.

The Island is located 500 meters off the coast of Abu Dhabi. An entire district on the island is devoted to culture and the arts, with exhibitions, permanent collections, productions and performances.

The primary contractors for the island are Al Jaber for Villa and HILALCO for Road and Infrastructures.

In developing the island project, the close cooperation model is being followed by TDIC and the government agencies, such as the Department of Transport to create an integrated project, complete with public amenities. Such close cooperation reassures smaller, private developers, who follow the GRE by providing smaller-scale works like shops, entertainment venues or real estate developments, which in turn attract a full-time resident community.

== Districts ==
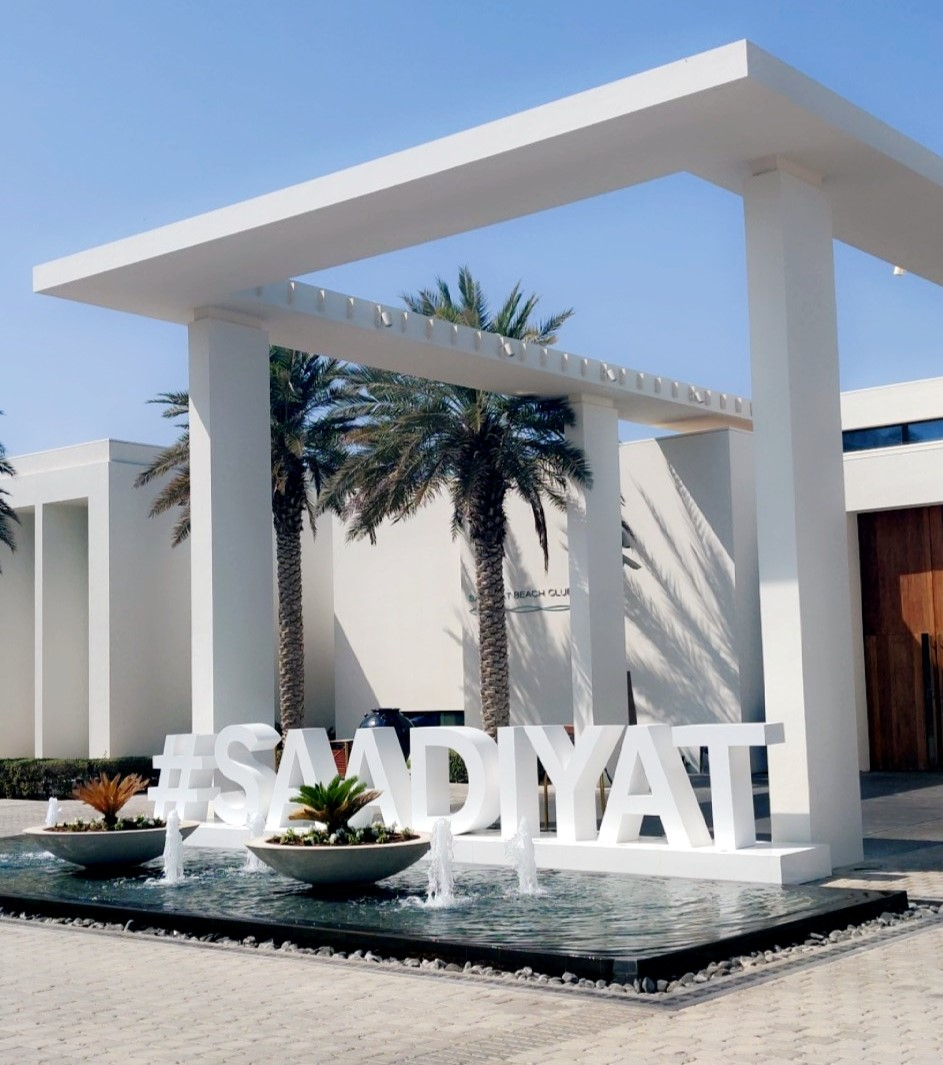
Saadiyat Island Beach Club

Saadiyat Island, a natural island that is the focus of 27 km^{2} of development, will be divided into 7 districts (Arabic: منطقة) which will eventually accommodate over 145,000 people.

=== Saadiyat Cultural District ===
Located at the Western end of the island, Saadiyat Cultural District occupies not much more than 10 per cent of the total area of the project.

The Cultural District lies on a total area of 2.43 square kilometres (0.94 mi^{2}). Institutions in the district include:

- Louvre Abu Dhabi by Jean Nouvel, opened in 2017
- Guggenheim Abu Dhabi by Frank Gehry, under construction; expected to open in 2026
- Zayed National Museum by Foster + Partners, opened in December 2025
- Natural History Museum Abu Dhabi by Mecanoo, opened in November 2025
- teamLab Phenomena Abu Dhabi, opened in April 2025
- Bassam Freiha Art Foundation, opened in March 2024
- Manarat Al Saadiyat, a cultural centre and exhibition venue
- Abrahamic Family House, opened in 2023
- Abu Dhabi Performing Arts Center by Zaha Hadid, on hold

A Maritime Museum designed by Tadao Ando was announced in the district's 2007 master plan but is not listed among active Cultural District projects and had not seen major public updates as of 2025.

=== Saadiyat Marina District ===
The Marina, the Island's main commercial area, has a total area of 3.7 square kilometres (1.4 mi^{2}), berthing for over 1,000 boats, hotels, apartments, leisure and entertainment facilities including commercial and retail space, and the New York University Abu Dhabi campus, which opened on Saadiyat in 2014 after relocating from a provisional downtown site.

== Museums and cultural institutions ==
The Cultural District groups national and international museums alongside private art foundations and exhibition venues. As of 2026, open institutions include the Louvre Abu Dhabi, Zayed National Museum, Natural History Museum Abu Dhabi, teamLab Phenomena Abu Dhabi and Bassam Freiha Art Foundation; the Guggenheim Abu Dhabi remains under construction.

=== Manarat Al Saadiyat ===
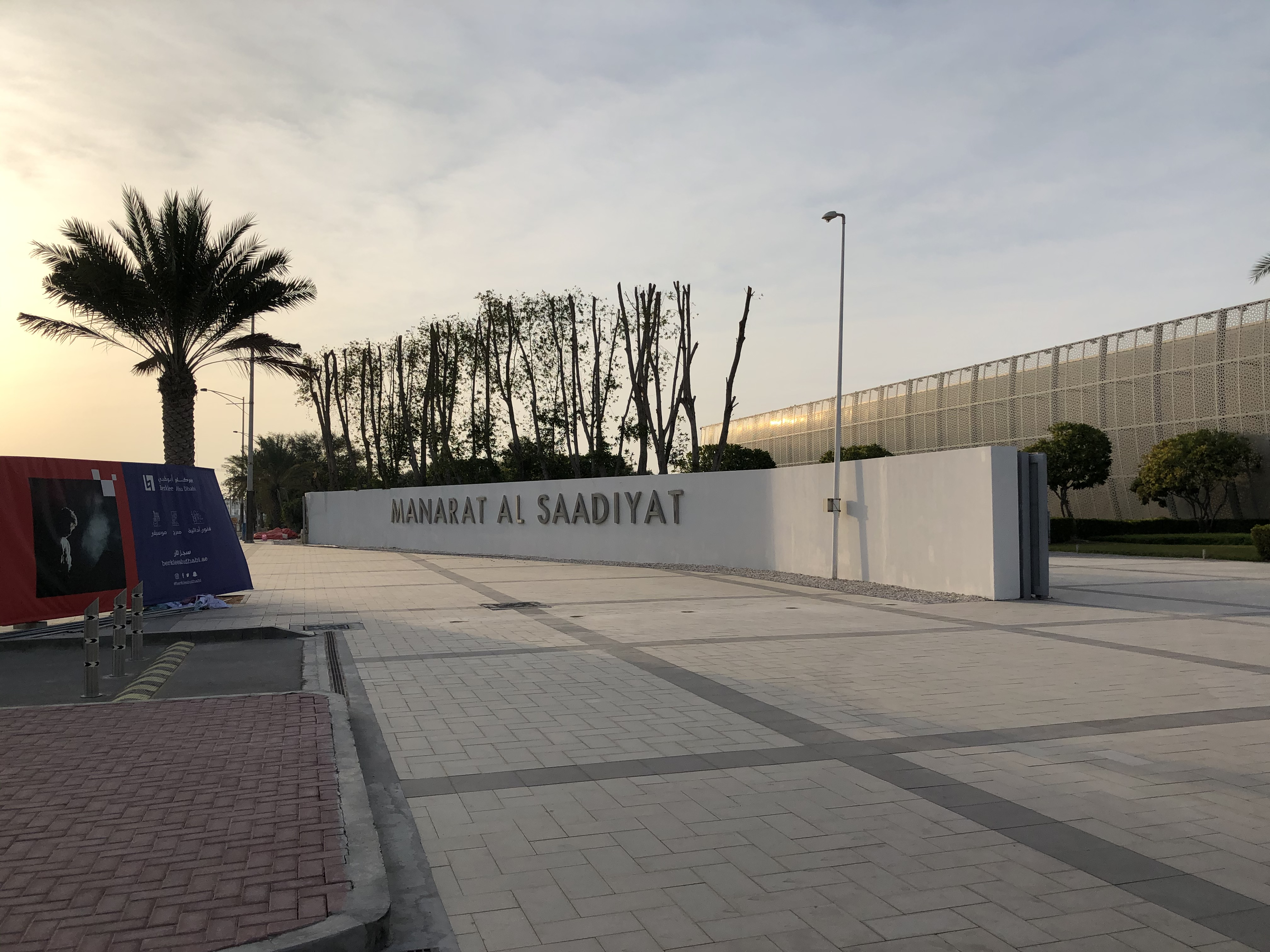
Manarat Al Saadiyat

Manarat Al Saadiyat (Arabic: منارة السعديات) is a cultural centre that hosts temporary exhibitions, including the annual Abu Dhabi Art fair, and the Saadiyat Experience, a permanent exhibition introducing the island's development plans.

=== Zayed National Museum ===
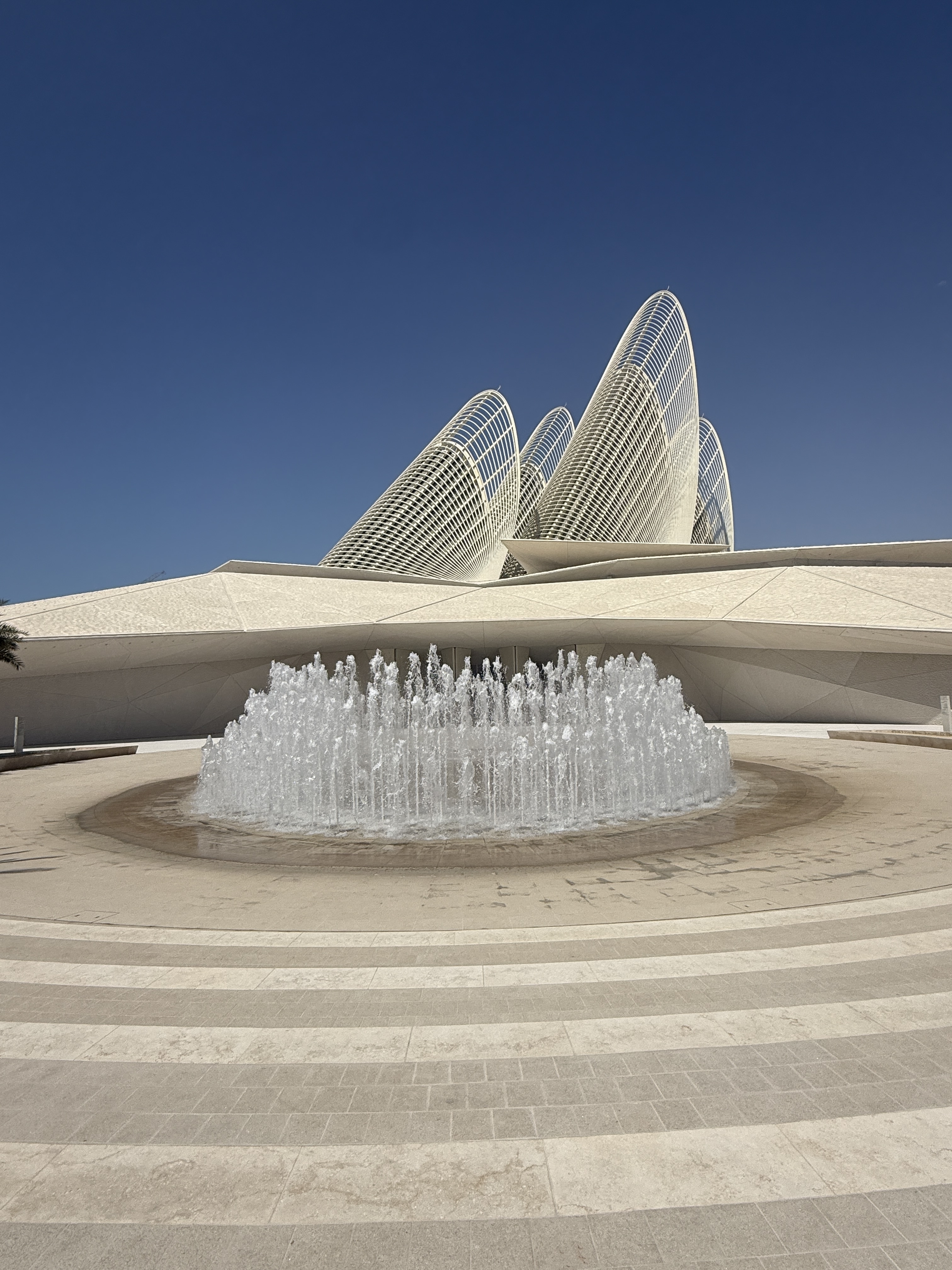
The Zayed National Museum entrance

Zayed National Museum, the national museum of the UAE, opened on 3 December 2025. It centers on a narrative linking the development of Abu Dhabi to the reign of the United Arab Emirates founding father (1966–2004) Sheikh Zayed bin Sultan Al Nahyan, and to structures having themes of education, conservation, environmental sustainability, cultural heritage, humanitarianism and faith.

=== Louvre Abu Dhabi ===
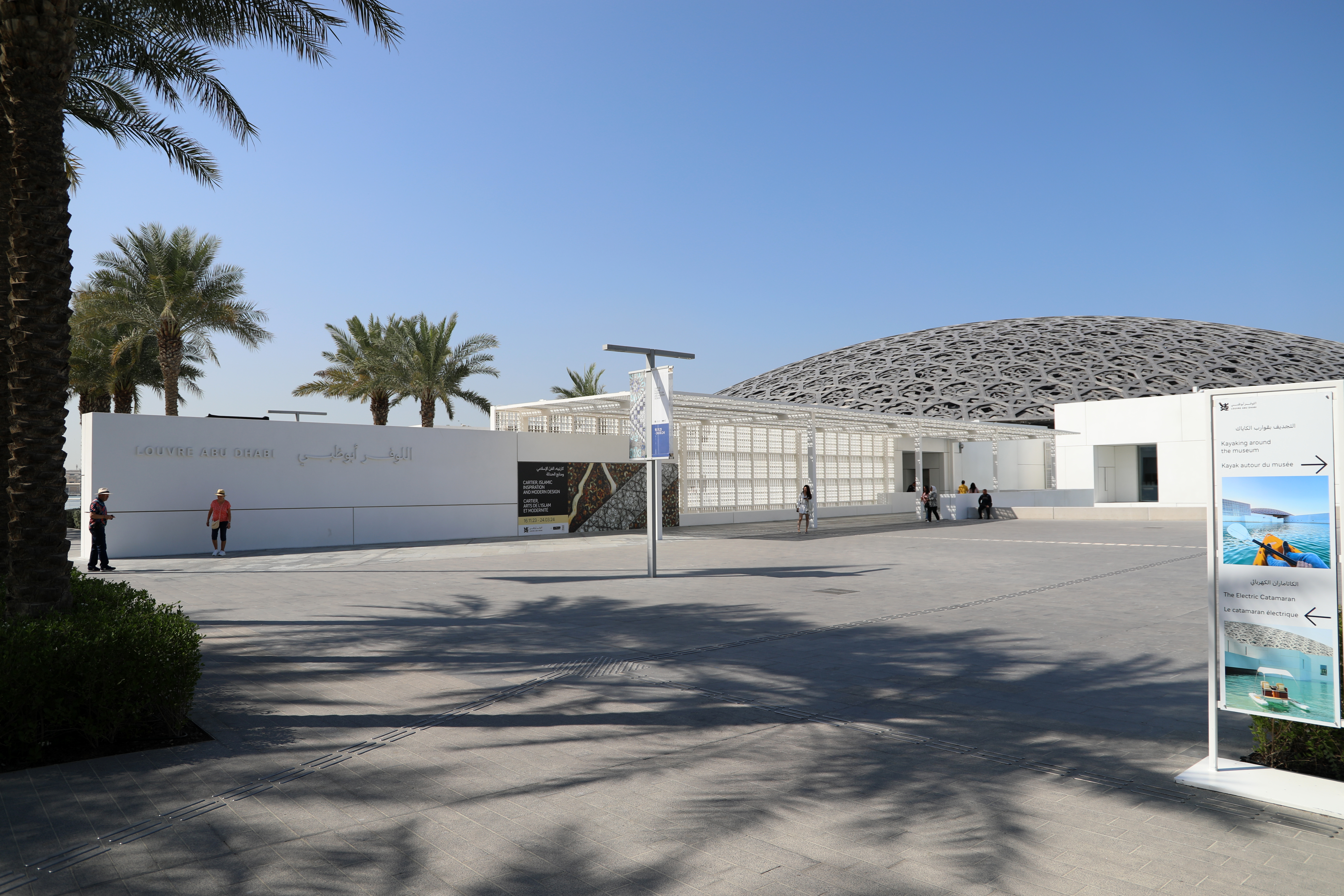
Exterior of the Louvre Abu Dhabi

Louvre Abu Dhabi is an Emirati-French collaboration project that was opened on 11 November 2017. It was designed by architect Jean Nouvel.

The Louvre Abu Dhabi will mark the first time the French government has entered into an international partnership to extend the Louvre overseas. The 30-year agreement, signed in 2007, will see the loan of some 200–300 artworks over the period of the deal.

=== Guggenheim Abu Dhabi ===
Guggenheim Abu Dhabi is a planned museum designed by Frank Gehry. At 30,000 m^{2} (320,000 sq ft), it is planned to be the largest of the Guggenheim museums. The museum will join Bilbao, Venice and New York in hosting the prestigious foundation. As of early 2026, construction was nearing completion and an opening towards the end of the year was expected.

=== Natural History Museum Abu Dhabi ===
Natural History Museum Abu Dhabi, designed by Mecanoo, opened on 22 November 2025. The museum traces the history of life on Earth through permanent galleries including The Story of Earth, The Evolving World and Earth's Future, and houses regional research facilities.

=== teamLab Phenomena Abu Dhabi ===
teamLab Phenomena Abu Dhabi is a permanent immersive digital art museum by the Japanese collective teamLab, housed in a building designed with MZ Architects. It opened on 18 April 2025.

=== Bassam Freiha Art Foundation ===
Bassam Freiha Art Foundation is a private non-profit art museum founded by collector Bassam Freiha. It opened in March 2024 adjacent to Manarat Al Saadiyat, displaying works from private collections with free public admission.

== Features ==
=== The Accommodation Village ===
The Saadiyat Accommodation Village, opened in 2009, is a modern housing community that offers social, recreational and educational facilities for residents.

=== Arts center ===
The arts center consists of five theaters, an opera house and several arenas for musical concerts. The center also has an experimental theater, the Abu Dhabi Performing Arts Academy with 3,557 m^{2} (38,290 sq ft) of space for educational activities about art, design, music and drama. The center also has shops and restaurants on a surface of 28,692 m^{2} (308,840 sq ft).

=== Abrahamic Family House ===
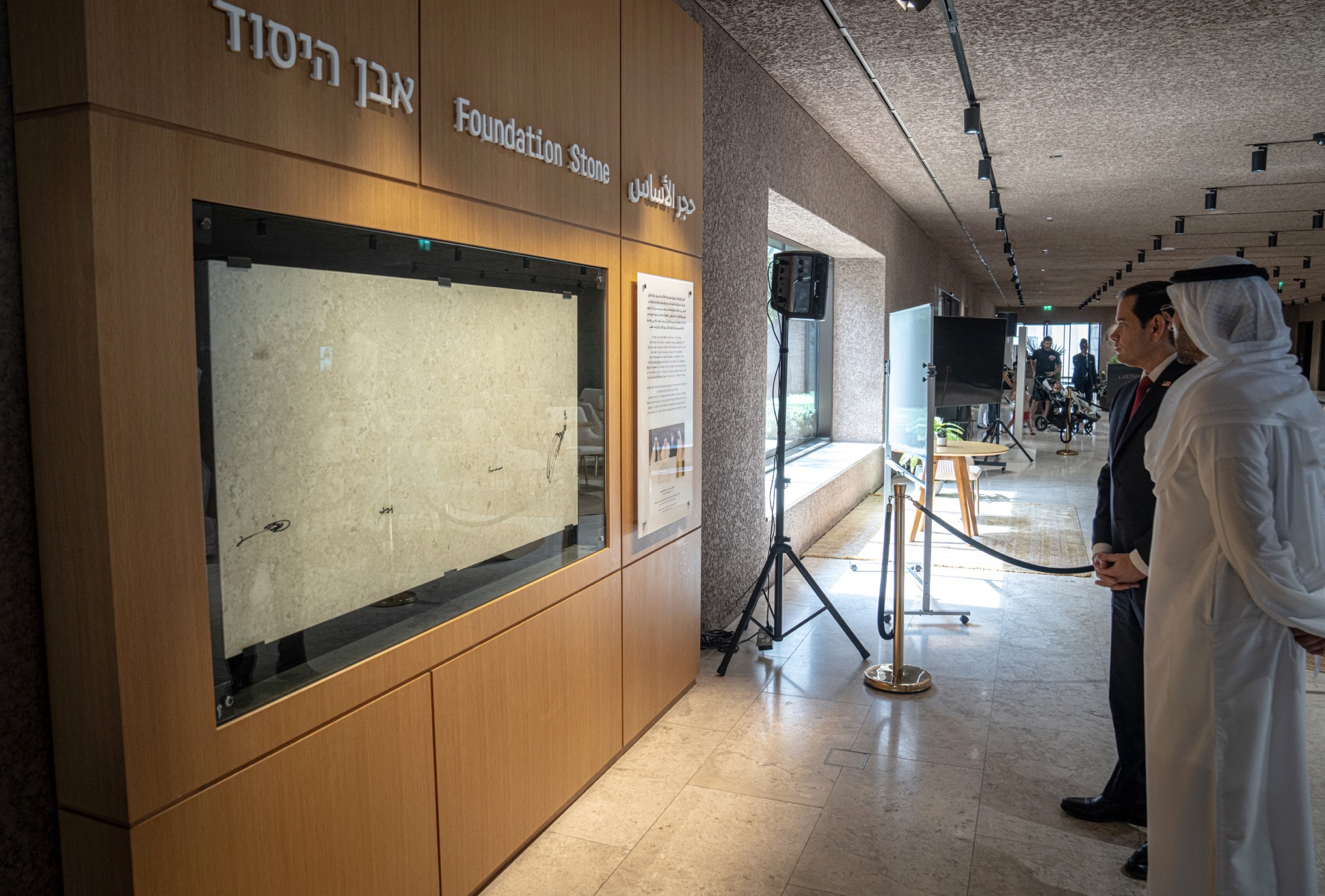
The Abrahamic Family House in the Saadiyat Cultural District

Commissioned by the Higher Committee of Human Fraternity, David Adjaye won a 2019 design competition for the Abrahamic Family House, consisting of three rectangular buildings – a church, a synagogue and a mosque – resting on a secular visitor pavilion. It opened in February 2023.

=== Schools ===
Schools include the Redwood Saadiyat Nursery by the first Kids Group, Cranleigh Abu Dhabi, and New York University Abu Dhabi by Mubadala Investment Company, providing education from pre-school to university level. The nursery school was set to open in 2013 to accommodate up to 140 children, offering educational and recreational facilities for pre-school education and using the Montessori method. Cranleigh Abu Dhabi opened in 2014, and subsequently won the 'British International School of the Year' award in 2017.

== See also ==
- Al Reem Island
- Yas Island
- Al Maryah Island
- Zayed National Museum
- Paris-Sorbonne University Abu Dhabi
- Masdar City
