= International Day of Human Fraternity =

Annual observance to promote cultural tolerance

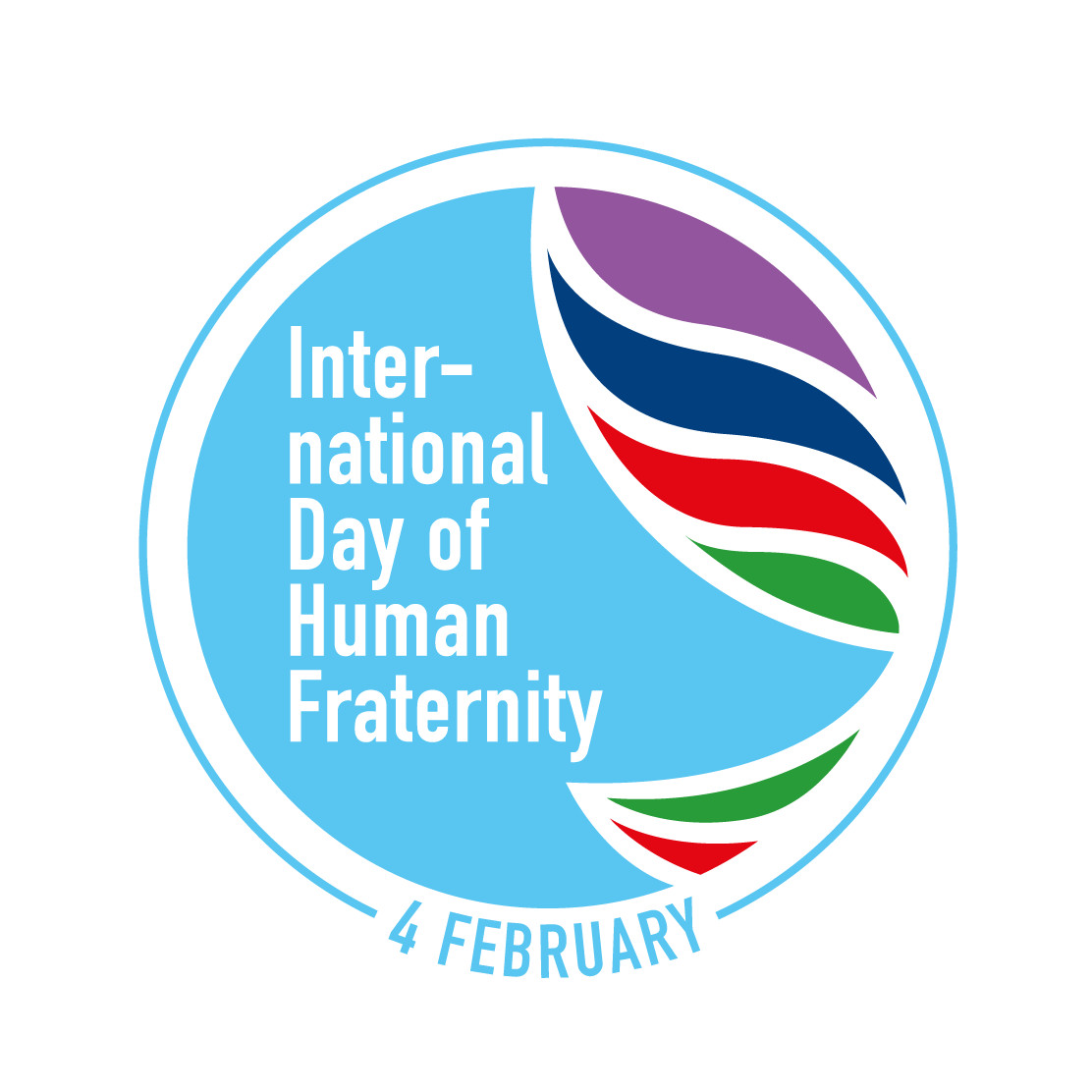
- Observed by: UN member states and International Organizations
- Significance: Promotes greater cultural and religious tolerance
- Date: February 4
- Next time: February 4, 2027
- Frequency: Annual
- First time: 2021
- Related to: United Nations

The International Day of Human Fraternity, held annually on February 4, is a United Nations observance, established by the United Nations General Assembly on December 21, 2020, with resolution 75/200 as a way to promote greater cultural and religious tolerance. With this resolution, which was co-facilitated by Egypt and the United Arab Emirates, the United Nations invited all its member states and other international organizations to observe the International Day of Human Fraternity annually.

Celebrations of the International Day of Human Fraternity include events attended by UN member states, religious leaders and civil society representatives along with the Zayed Award for Human Fraternity, which recognizes individuals or entities anywhere in the world for their profound contributions to human fraternity.

Since it was celebrated for the first time on February 4, 2021, the International Day of Human Fraternity has received endorsements from different world leaders. Pope Francis; Sheikh Ahmed el-Tayeb, Grand Imam of Al-Azhar; and United States President Joe Biden, have given their support to the initiative.

== Background ==
Pope Francis of the Catholic Church and Sheikh Ahmed el-Tayeb, Grand Imam of Al-Azhar, on February 4, 2019, in Abu Dhabi, United Arab Emirates, signed the Document on Human Fraternity for World Peace and Living Together, also known as the Abu Dhabi declaration. The principles of compassion and human solidarity embodied in this text are the same ones that later inspired the declaration that designated February 4 as the International Day of Human Fraternity, as it has been stated by the UN Secretary-General, António Guterres, in different occasions.

To fulfill the aspirations of the Document on Human Fraternity, the Higher Committee of Human Fraternity (HCHF), was established in August 2019. The HCHF, which is constituted by both religious and civil leaders from different countries and creeds, awards the Zayed Award for Human Fraternity among other initiatives.

Finally, the Document on Human Fraternity also influenced the encyclical Fratelli tutti, as Pope Francis acknowledges in the same text by stating that he was inspired to write it by his meeting with Ahmed el-Tayeb in 2019.

== See also ==
- Document on Human Fraternity for World Peace and Living Together
- Fratelli tutti
- Interfaith dialogue
