= Yehuda Sarna =

Former Chief Rabbi of Moses bin Maimon Synagogue

Rabbi Yehuda Sarna

Former Chief Rabbi of the Moses Ben Maimon Synagogue
- In office February 2023 – 2024

Personal details
- Born: Montreal, Quebec, Canada

Rabbi Yehuda Sarna is a Canadian-born Rabbi who served as the Chief Rabbi of the Moses Ben Maimon Synagogue of the Abrahamic Family House in Abu Dhabi, United Arab Emirates. He is also Executive Director of the Bronfman Center for Jewish Life at New York University (NYU), and a professor at NYU's Wagner School and University Chaplain at NYU.

== Biography ==
Rabbi Sarna was born in Montreal, Canada. He attended Yeshivat Har Etzion from 1995 to 1997 before earning his B.A. in English Literature and Judaic Studies from Yeshiva College. Rabbi Sarna, along with Imam Khalid Latif, co-founded the 'Of Many' Institute for Multifaith Leadership at NYU. They teach a course together and lead service trips to cultivate cooperation and dialogue among students from different faiths. Sarna has been instrumental in building a strong and diverse Jewish presence at NYU.

In 2017, Rabbi Sarna learned of a small, under the radar Jewish community that met for services every week in people's homes in Dubai, a short drive from Abu Dhabi. He began advising them on religious and communal matters. By 2019, known in the UAE as the Year of Tolerance, the community asked Rabbi Sarna to serve as Chief Rabbi given its increasingly public profile. Rabbi Sarna became Chief Rabbi of the Jewish Council of the Emirates. The historic character of the community was not lost on its members: this was the first new Jewish community to be established in the Arab world in over a century.

In 2016, Rabbi Sarna was appointed to the Muslim-Jewish Advisory Council, a project of the American Jewish Committee and the Islamic Society of North America, which successfully lobbied for tougher legislation to address the underreporting of hate crimes.

In 2007, he founded the Jewish Learning Fellowship, a ten-week course in Jewish thought for college students.

He is the editor of The Koren Shabbat Evening Siddur (2011) and the Orthodox Forum Series: Toward a Jewish Perspective on Culture (2013).

== Chief Rabbi of the Moses Ben Maimon Synagogue ==
In 2023, Rabbi Sarna was appointed Chief Rabbi of the Moses Ben Maimon Synagogue of the Abrahamic Family House in Abu Dhabi. He served in that role until 2024.

== Chief Rabbi of the Jewish Council of the Emirates ==
Prior to becoming the Chief Rabbi of the Moses Ben Maimon Synagogue, Rabbi Sarna was appointed Chief Rabbi of the Jewish Council of the Emirates (JCE) in 2019. As of 2026 he was no longer serving as Chief Rabbi.

== Awards and recognition ==
Rabbi Sarna has received numerous awards for his work. In 2009, he was an honoree at the Jewish Learning Initiative on Campus Awards dinner. Additionally in 2009, he was listed as one of the "36-under-36" by The Jewish Week. In 2012, Rabbi Sarna received an award from Temple of Understanding with NYU's Imam Khalid Latif and Chelsea Clinton for their work in, "advancing a new model of integrating interfaith and cross cultural education into campus life." In 2013, he was honored by Yeshivat Har Etzion as "Alumnus of the Year."

== Personal life ==
Rabbi Sarna is married to psychologist Michelle Waldman Sarna. They have six children.

== See also ==
- Elie Abadie – Senior Rabbi of Jewish Council of the Emirates
- Levi Duchman – Chief Rabbi of Jewish Community Center
