= Multifaith =

To be multifaith is to feel an affinity with aspects of more than one religion, philosophy or world-view, or to believe that none of them is superior to the others. This term should not be confused with interfaith, which concerns the communication between different religions.

This is inherent to Relativism but exists among followers of other religions such as Confucianism and the Baháʼí Faith, as well as followers of the more liberal currents within Christianity, Islam, and Judaism.

The reception of the Multicultural movement since the 1960s has generally been positive, but there are some critiques.

== See also ==
- 1910 World Missionary Conference
- Ecumenism
- Fundamentalism
- Interdenominational
- Interfaith dialogue
- London Missionary Society
- Multiculturalism
- Multifaith space
- Objective truth
- Religious pluralism
- Spirituality
- Subjectivity
- Syncretism
- Universalism
