= Bruce Lustig =

American rabbi

Rabbi Emeritus Bruce Lustig

Personal life
- Born: 1957 or 1958 (age 67–68) Nashville, Tennessee, U.S.
- Education: University of Tennessee (B.A.)

Religious life
- Religion: Judaism
- Denomination: Reform Judaism

Jewish leader
- Predecessor: Joseph P. Weinberg
- Successor: Susan Shankman
- Synagogue: Washington Hebrew Congregation
- Position: Senior Rabbi
- Began: 1999
- Ended: 2022
- Semikhah: Hebrew Union College

M. Bruce Lustig (born c. 1957 or 1958) is an American retired rabbi who previously served as Senior Rabbi at the Washington Hebrew Congregation (WHC). He served as Senior Rabbi for twenty-three years, from 1999 to 2022, and served at the WHC for over thirty-six years, starting in 1986.

Born in Nashville, Tennessee, Lustig graduated from the University of Tennessee and the Hebrew Union College in Cincinnati, Ohio. One year after completing his rabbinical studies, he joined the Washington Hebrew Congregation. He became Senior Rabbi in 1999; one of his first initiatives was Mitzvah Day, an annual event during which volunteers of different ages "work on projects for social service agencies that would improve the lives of people in need."

In 2015, Lustig one of many Reform rabbis who joined a 40-day march in Washington which had been organized by the NAACP to commemorate the 50th anniversary of the Voting Rights Act of 1965.

In response to the Unite the Right rally in Charlottesville, Virginia in 2018, Lustig was amongst the Jewish groups in D.C. to organize a counterprotest to condemn the white supremacist rally.

In 2019, Lustig was included on the Higher Committee of Human Fraternity by Pope Francis and Grand Imam Ahmed el-Tayed to promote interfaith friendship; he was the sole Jewish representative there. In Washington, D.C., he is considered a leader in the capital's interfaith community and organized the first Abrahamic Summit held in the United States, between the Christian, Muslim, and Jewish communities.

That same year, Lustig gave sermon on the floor of the U.S. House of Representatives.

After health issues, Lustig retired as Senior Rabbi at the Washington Hebrew Congregation in October 2022. He was succeeded by Susan Shankman.
