= Multifaith space =

Public location for religious practices

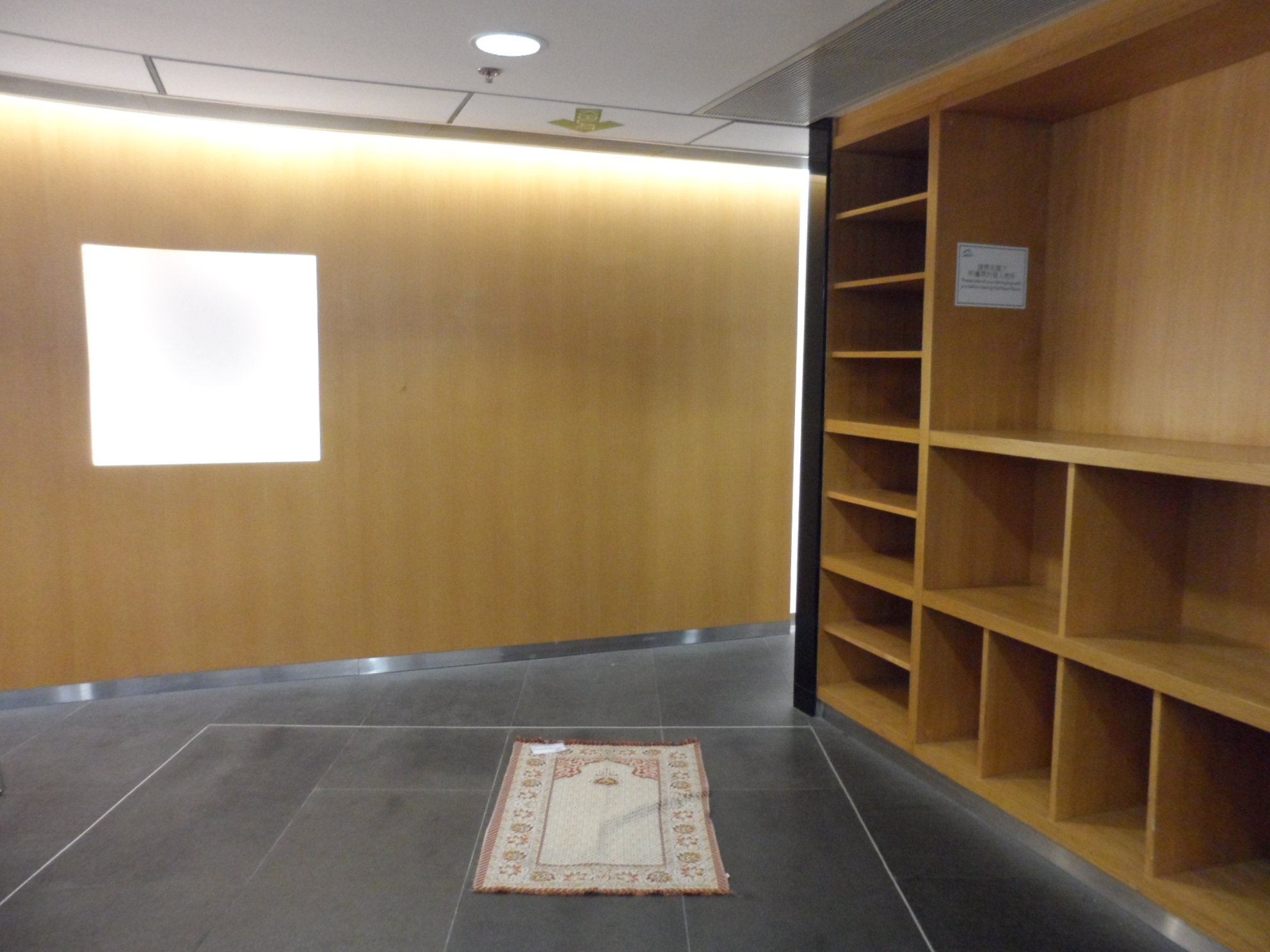
Multifaith prayer room in Hong Kong International Airport

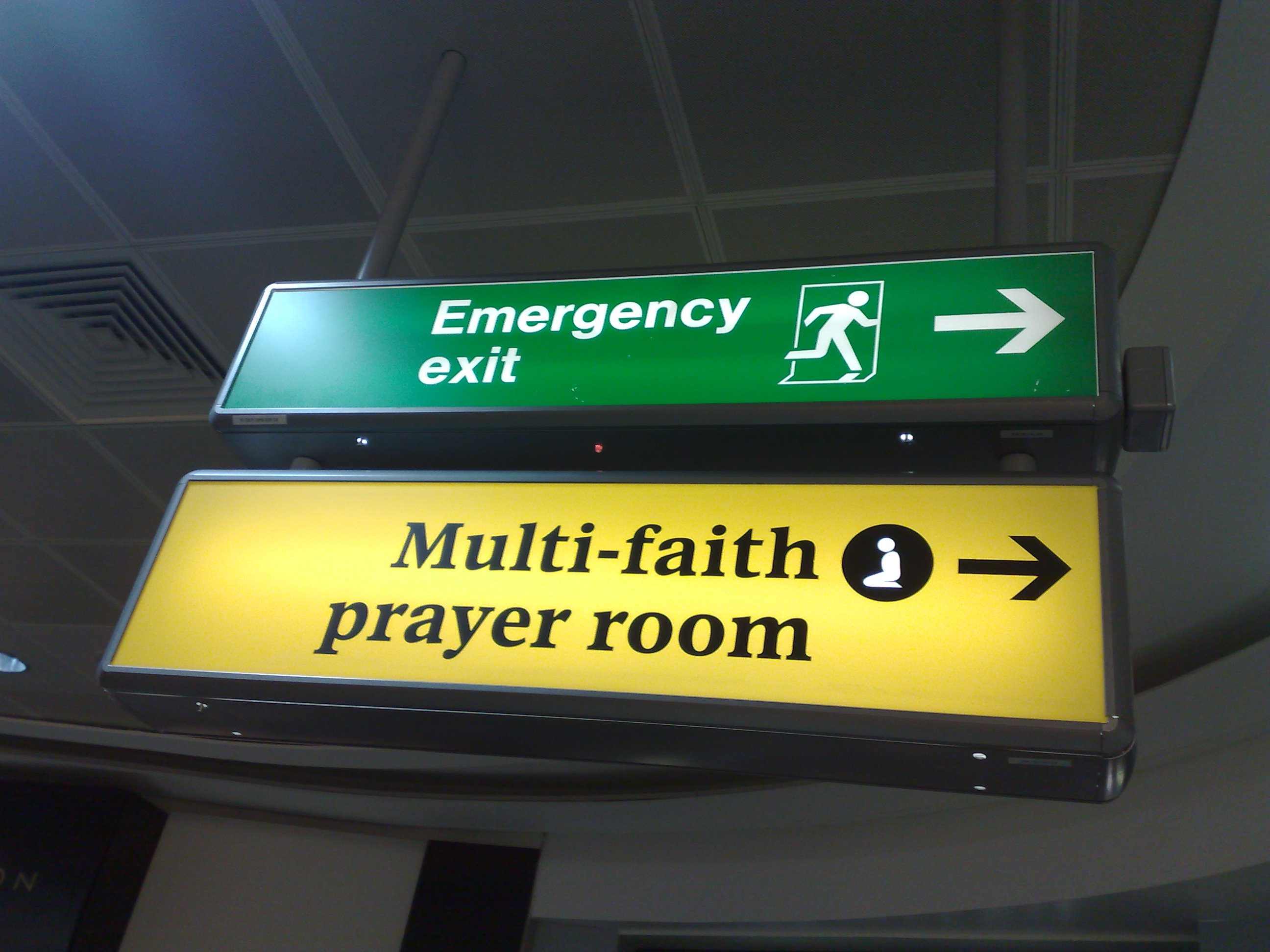
Multi-faith prayer room sign in London Heathrow Airport

A multifaith space or multifaith prayer room is a quiet location set aside in a busy public place (hospital, university, airport, etc.) where people of differing religious beliefs, or none at all, are able to spend time in contemplation or prayer. Many of these spaces are small, clean and largely unadorned areas, which can be adapted and serve for any religious or spiritual practice. Occasionally, persons of different faiths may come together in such spaces within the context of multifaith worship services.

The space may or may not be a dedicated place of worship. A research project at the University of Manchester has conceptualised the modern multifaith space as "an intentional space, designed to both house a plurality of religious practices, as well as address clearly defined pragmatic purposes."

The phenomenon of the Multi-faith Spaces is quite recent. Firstly, modern non-denominational space precursors include the Meditation Room at the United Nations in New York (1957) and the Rothko Chapel in Houston (1971). Secondly, multi-denominational and ecumenical initiatives, such as the MIT Chapel in Cambridge, Massachusetts (1955), and the United States Air Force Academy Cadet Chapel in Colorado Springs (1962); in both cases, Christian and Jewish provision provided the basis for later enhancement. Thirdly, we see spaces that prefigure the MFS today, such as the Vienna International Airport prayer room/chapel (1988).

According to religious scholar Terry Biddington, multifaith spaces became more common during the late 1980s and early 1990s due to various factors such as increased economic migration, a rise in asylum seekers, expanded global travel and cultural interaction, and the resulting cosmopolitanism in Western cities. This trend reflects the growing presence of individuals from diverse religious backgrounds alongside ongoing debates about the perceived long-term shift towards secularization in the Western world.

== Design concepts ==
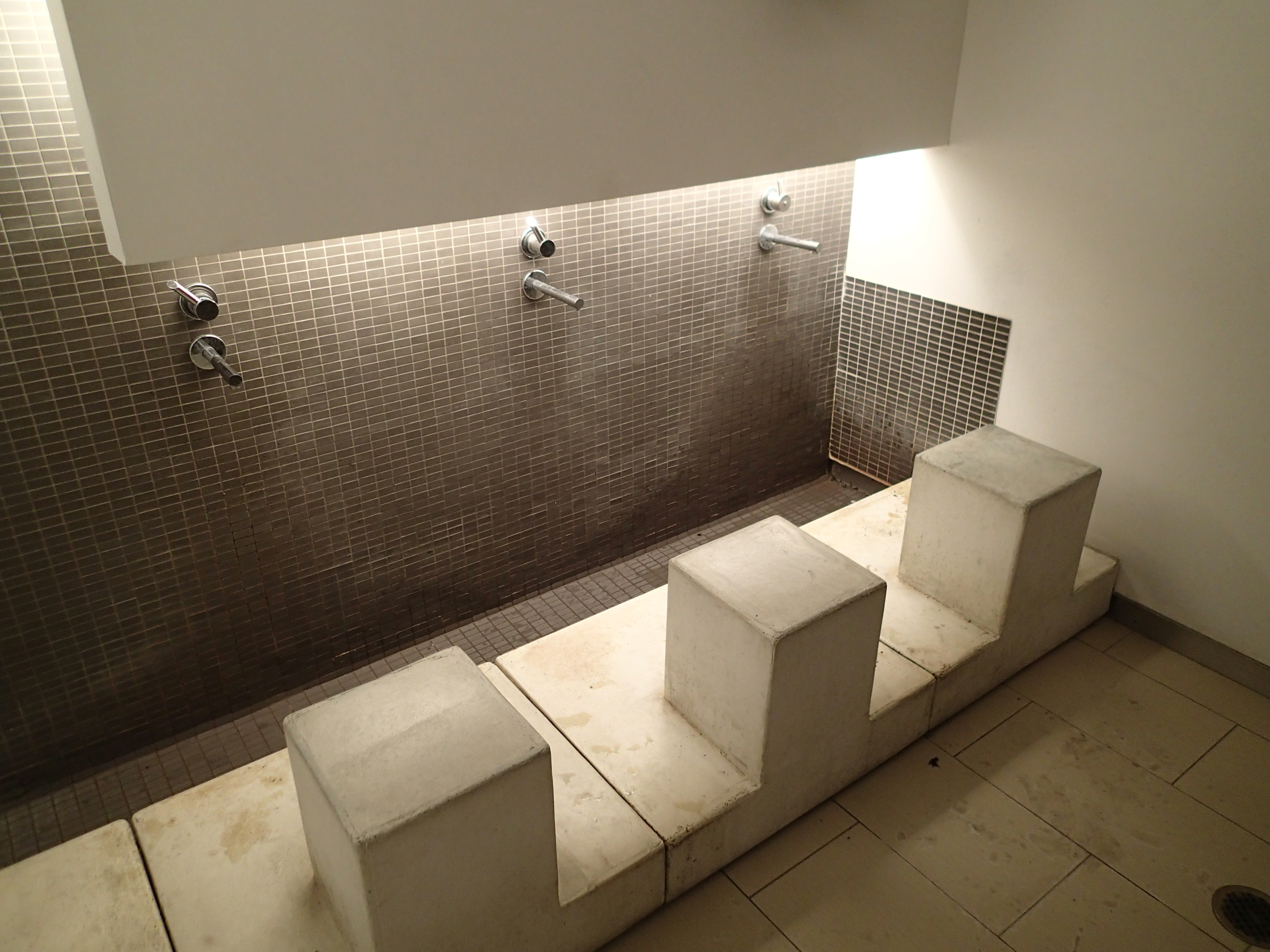
Ablution facility in the University of Toronto's multifaith building

MFSs are designated for various spiritual activities and should address both religious and non-religious needs without a bias towards any worldviews. While their emergence resulted from both grassroots initiatives and voluntary decisions of facilities’ management, MFSs began to be promoted and recommended, among others, by European government agencies. MFSs are still not well-defined because of their novelty, and there are no architectural guidelines for the construction and design of MFSs.

Nonetheless, most of the existing spaces follow similar style patterns. An architect and lecturer, Andrew Crompton, noted two basic types of MFSs: a negative style, shared by a majority of such places in Europe and the USA, and a positive one.

- The negative style is characterized by a neutral design and the absence of religion-specific items or symbols on permanent display. In Crompton’s original words, "A windowless white room with a few religious texts on a shelf and the paraphernalia of religion, when not actually in use, kept out of sight in boxes" made from unobtrusive materials is the most common type of negative design.
- The positive style shows symbols and items about multiple religious denominations. It is often described as ‘unity by inclusion,’ where artifacts of different faiths are displayed, and different groups visibly occupy the spaces. Positive designs emphasize individualized belief or faith and strengthen the cohesion among already distinct religious traditions. According to the Economist (2013), regardless of their style, some MFSs are set up in repurposed Christian chapels, but most are constructed from scratch.

Religious scholar Francisco Díez de Velasco, arguing in favor of neutral/negative designs, points out that these tend to prevail as they respond to a need for practicality, as well as being materially convenient on the economic side, given the increase of religious and cultural diversity in present society. Díez de Velasco also argues that neutral designs would also be suitable for non-religiously affiliated people and groups, in force of "the rising abandonment of standard religious practice and the diverse phenomena involved in redefining religious identities on an individual and collective scale that some have attempted to group beneath the umbrella term of secularization(s)."

The Manchester University research highlighted two key factors for a multifaith space to work:

- There needs to be a balance achieved for the range of different users most likely to make regular use of the space, thus preventing conflict. All norms and values need to be considered and respected, which often leads to an "unstable equilibrium where divergent worldviews can be brought together." Social cooperation and openness must be possible within the space.
- Most multifaith spaces maintain a very basic design, in order to minimize the visibility of a single faith group, whilst remaining easily adaptable to the many different practices for which the space may be utilized. Each space raises question of ethics and "national style", in which different faith members are able to participate in a mutually respectful, yet cooperative, manner.

== Social impact and challenges ==
There are controversial opinions about the role and potential of MFSs. Some scientists credit them for promoting religious harmony and highlight their positive role in facilitating religious practice, promoting tolerance, and balancing religious and secular provisions. This side of the debate argues that MFSs' potential for promoting social peace lies in their ability to unite individuals from different backgrounds and provide a safe space for social interaction.

On the other hand, MFSs are often criticized for the infusion of religious identity and for producing stereotypes and conflicts over sharing space. Even though multi-faith spaces have appeared to be a vital component of contemporary secular institutions, accommodating diverse religious beliefs within shared environments is challenging because of complicated social dilemmas and ideological discrepancies.

As argued by religious scholar Ryszard Bobrowicz, the danger of ideological manipulation represents one of the major challenges in this context, as either a negative design that promotes privatized versions of religion or a positive design that may be aligned to specialized denominations can become grounds for competing agendas. These structural yet subtle manipulations might undermine the original purpose of these neutral entities by maintaining models of religious intolerance.

Furthermore, multifaith spaces may create complex inquiries about religious autonomy and state neutrality. Therefore, they should maintain a delicate balance between accommodating diverse religious identities and preserving the standards of inclusivity and neutrality.

In addition, logistical issues like equitable allocation of resources and spaces among different religious communities can be practically challenging. An example of this may be the issue of scheduling the usage of MFSs, with Muslim people often needing the spaces more frequently throughout the day due to the daily scheduled time for prayers.

Finally, sustaining a civil and agreeable condition within these spaces requires healthy, constant dialogue and compromise among stakeholders, including religious leaders, administrators, and community members. This represents a significant step towards promoting religious tolerance, pluralism, and mutual understanding.

== See also ==
- Interfaith worship spaces
- Religious pluralism
- Religious tolerance
- Universalism
