= Fraternity (philosophy) =

Ethical relationship between people

In philosophy, fraternity or brotherhood is a kind of ethical relationship between people, which is based on love and solidarity.

Fraternity is mentioned in the national motto of France, Liberté, égalité, fraternité (lit. 'Liberty, equality, fraternity'), and a slogan of the League of Communists of Yugoslavia, "Brotherhood and unity".

== Blood Brotherhood ==
A strong bond of solidarity is symbolically represented—particularly in pre-Islamic and Islamic culture (muʾākhāt) and in some areas of equatorial Africa—by a ritual that enacts a sort of biological fraternity: two individuals, through self-inflicted wounds, mix their blood, thereby establishing a fictitious kinship.

In the Middle Ages, the practice of brotherhood-in-arms was common among knights who swore mutual loyalty and support to each other.

== Universal Brotherhood ==
Universal brotherhood, enshrined in the Universal Declaration of Human Rights, appeals to the shared human condition that unites all people in the same fate of life and death. From this arises a sense of fraternity that should be expressed through solidarity toward peoples in particular distress due to disease, famine, lack of water, or malnutrition.

Inspired by this principle of universal brotherhood and supported by international public funding, specific organizations — such as UNESCO, FAO, UNICEF, WHO, ILO and UNHCR — have been created by the United Nations to address global needs.

== Human Fraternity ==
Human fraternity, understood as a principle of peaceful coexistence, is the new frontier of humanity. This is the central idea of the Document on Human Fraternity for World Peace and Living Together, signed in Abu Dhabi by the Grand Imam of Al-Azhar, Ahmed el-Tayeb, and Pope Francis on February 4, 2019. The Document highlights the need for a shared path for women and men of our time in the pursuit and promotion of a culture of encounter and mutual respect. A further development in the understanding of human fraternity can be found in the Encyclical Fratelli Tutti, a letter on fraternity and social friendship dated October 3, 2020. The letter emphasizes the need to build a new human fraternity grounded in the principles of solidarity and subsidiarity in a society where prejudice and the “throwaway culture” often prevail.

On the opposite side, there is the belief according which "is a Christian concept that you love your family and then you love your neighbour, and then you love your community, and then you love your fellow citizens, and then after that, prioritise the rest of the world".

== See also ==
- International Day of Human Fraternity
