= Human rights in the Quran =

Primary sources of Islamic communication text

In its Arabic text, the Quran is considered the primary source of authority by Muslims. The Quran is a relatively short book of 77,797 words that are divided into one hundred and fourteen chapters (Suras). A hundred and thirteen of the chapters of the Quran begin with an indication of the book's intent (In the name of God the All- Compassionate and the Ever-Merciful).

The book is largely concerned with establishing boundaries that Muslims are prohibited from transgressing. Within these boundaries the Quran treats human beings as equally valuable and endowed with certain rights by virtue of simply being human, hence Human rights. The rights bestowed upon humans in the Quran include the right to life and peaceful living as well as the right to own, protect, and have property protected Islamic economic jurisprudence. The Quran also contains rights for minority groups and women, as well as regulations of human interactions between one another to the extent of dictating how prisoners of war ought to be treated.

== Equality ==
17:70 We have honored the children of Adam and provided them with rides on land and in the sea. We provided for them good provisions, and we gave them greater advantages than many of our creatures.

49:13 O humanity! Indeed, We created you from a male and a female and made you into peoples and tribes so that you may get to know one another. Surely the most noble of you in the sight of Allah is the most righteous among you. Allah is truly All-Knowing, All-Aware.

The Quran states that all humans are the descendants of one man Adam and are therefore brothers to one another (Human rights in Islam). The emphasis on equality and justice in the Quran appears throughout the text and even includes one's enemy. The duty of Muslims to be and truthful enjoys a high priority status, in the Quran, and is described in the following manner, that "O you who believe! be maintainers of Justice, bearers of the witness of Allah's sake, Though it may be against your selves or (your) parents or near relatives; if he is rich or poor, Allah is nearer to them both in compassion; therefore do not follow (your) low desires, lest you deviate; and if swerve or turn aside, then surely Allah is aware of what you do". The Quran, also unequivocally restricts its believers from aiding someone in need of their help only where they intend to deceive or carry out an act of aggression by stating "help one another in goodness and piety, and do not help one another in sin and aggression". Furthermore, the Quran teaches its followers that treating followers of other religions justly, and kindly is an article of faith.

== Right to life and peaceful living ==
According to the Quran, life is a divine bestowal on humanity that should be secured and defended by all means (Islamic bioethics). According to the Quran, it is the individual and universal duty of Muslims to protect the human merits and virtues of others. Life in the Quran is attributed tremendous value, in fact, the Quran says that " whoever slays a soul, it is as though he slew all men; and whoever keeps it alive, it is as though he kept alive all men;". The Quran forbids the taking of life without due process of the law, and it also obligates Muslims to provide for those who cannot provide for themselves. The right to life is conferred by the Quran even on one's enemy during the war as Muslims are forbidden from using force except in self-defense. Also protected by the Quran are the Elderly, women, and children of the enemy and to these, there are no exceptions.

== Right to own and protect property ==
The Quran bestows upon humans the right to property as well as, the freedom to deal and trade as they please in what they own provided they do so fairly. Moreover, throughout the Quran the feeding of orphans, the poor, and the needy are an article of faith that signal one's true devotion to the teachings of the Quran. The message is made clearly and unambiguously in the following verse " Those, who, Should We establish them in the law, will keep up prayer and pay the poor-rate and enjoin good and forbid evil; and Allah's is the end of affairs". The principles of justly protecting the rights and property of those in need of such protection, such as orphans, brought together effortlessly in the Quran when it says " And give to the orphans their property, and do not substitute worthless (thing) for (their) good (ones), and do not devour their property (as an addition) to you own property; this is surely a great crime".

== Rights of minorities and other religious groups ==
[18:29] Proclaim: "This is the truth from your Lord," then whoever wills let him believe, and whoever wills let him disbelieve.

[107:1-7] Do you know who really rejects the faith? That is the one who mistreats the orphans. And does not advocate the feeding of the poor. And woe to those who observe the contact prayers (Salat) – who are totally heedless of their prayers. They only show off. And they forbid charity.

[51:19] And in their wealth there was a rightful share ˹fulfilled˺ for the beggar and the poor.

[109:1-5] Say, ˹O Prophet,˺ “O you disbelievers! I do not worship what you worship, nor do you worship what I worship. I will never worship what you worship, nor will you ever worship what I worship. For you is your way, and for me is my way."

According to the Quran, Muslims are prohibited from using any method of compulsion to influence the religious practices, and beliefs. The Quran also obligates Muslims to protect all the places of worship where God's name is remembered including cloisters and churches and synagogues and mosques . In relation to different ethnic, cultural, and religious groups the Quran tells Muslims that Allah has created diverse communities with different laws to test them, encouraging everyone to compete in doing good deeds and strive for virtue. The Quran advocates equality between all saying that the only good deeds may raise the status of one human over another.

== Women's rights ==
With regards to women's rights the Quran dedicates one chapter of its one-hundred and fourteen chapters to women which is evident from the very name of the chapter, Women (an-Nisa). The Quran in that chapter states that whoever does good deeds, whether they are male or female, shall enter Paradise and not the least bit of injustice shall be dealt to them. The same message is repeated in chapter sixteen "Whoever does good whether male or female and he is a believer, we will most certainly make him live a happy life, and We will most certainly give them their reward for the best of what they did". The ability of women to bear children is a significant attribute used by the Quran in a number of verses to uplift the status of women. One such chapter states "And We have enjoined man in respect of his parents--his mother bears him with fainting upon fainting and his weaning takes two years--saying: Be grateful to Me and to both your parents; to Me is the eventual coming". In terms of the economic rights of women, the Quran demands "And give women their dowries as a free gift, but if they of themselves be pleased to give up to you a portion of it, then eat it with enjoyment and with wholesome result". Women have also been given the right to inherit in the Quran. The Quran in one particular verse creates an additional obligation on men to provide, protect, and generally take care of women as their guardians and not as superiors. Perhaps the most valued status, with regards to women, is that of a mother in the Quran as it illustrates this point by binding the reward of paradise to those who satisfy the needs of their parents.

== See also ==
- Islam and humanity
- Cairo Declaration on Human Rights in Islam
- Human rights in Muslim-majority countries
