= Abrahamic Family House =

Interfaith complex in Abu Dhabi, UAE

- بيت العائلة الإبراهيمية
- Abrahamic Family House
- Interactive map of the Abrahamic Family House area

General information
- Location: Cultural District, Al Saadiyat Island, Abu Dhabi, United Arab Emirates
- Coordinates: 24.530933°N 54.406101°E
- Construction started: 2019
- Completed: 2023
- Opened: 1 March 2023
- Inaugurated: 16 February 2023
- Governing body: Higher Committee of Human Fraternity
- Affiliation: Imam Al-Tayeb Mosque; St. Francis Church; Moses Ben Maimon Synagogue

Technical details
- Size: 82,882 sq ft (7,700.0 m^{2})

Design and construction
- Architect: David Adjaye
- Architecture firm: Adjaye Associates

Other information
- Public transit: Bus Route 94 (Bus Schedule)

Website
- Official Website

The Abrahamic Family House (Arabic: بيت العائلة الإبراهيمية) is an interfaith complex on Saadiyat Island in Abu Dhabi, United Arab Emirates, which houses a mosque, a church, and synagogue. The undertaking was inspired by the Document on Human Fraternity signed by Pope Francis on behalf of the Catholic Church and Ahmed El-Tayeb on behalf of the al-Azhar Mosque on 4 February 2019 in Abu Dhabi. The project is an initiative toward tolerance and coexistence among Abrahamic faiths. It houses the St. Francis Church, Imam Al-Tayeb Mosque and Moses Ben Maimon Synagogue in separate structures.

The project was supervised by the Higher Committee of Human Fraternity (HCHF).

== History ==
Abrahamic Family House was announced by Abdullah bin Zayed, Minister of Foreign Affairs, on 5 February 2019 at a meeting of the Higher Committee of Human Fraternity at the New York Public Library.

It was officially inaugurated on 16 February 2023 by Lt. General Sheikh Saif bin Zayed Al Nahyan, Deputy Prime Minister and Minister of the Interior, and Sheikh Nahyan bin Mubarak Al Nahyan, Minister of Tolerance and Coexistence. The complex is open to all for free.

== Mission ==
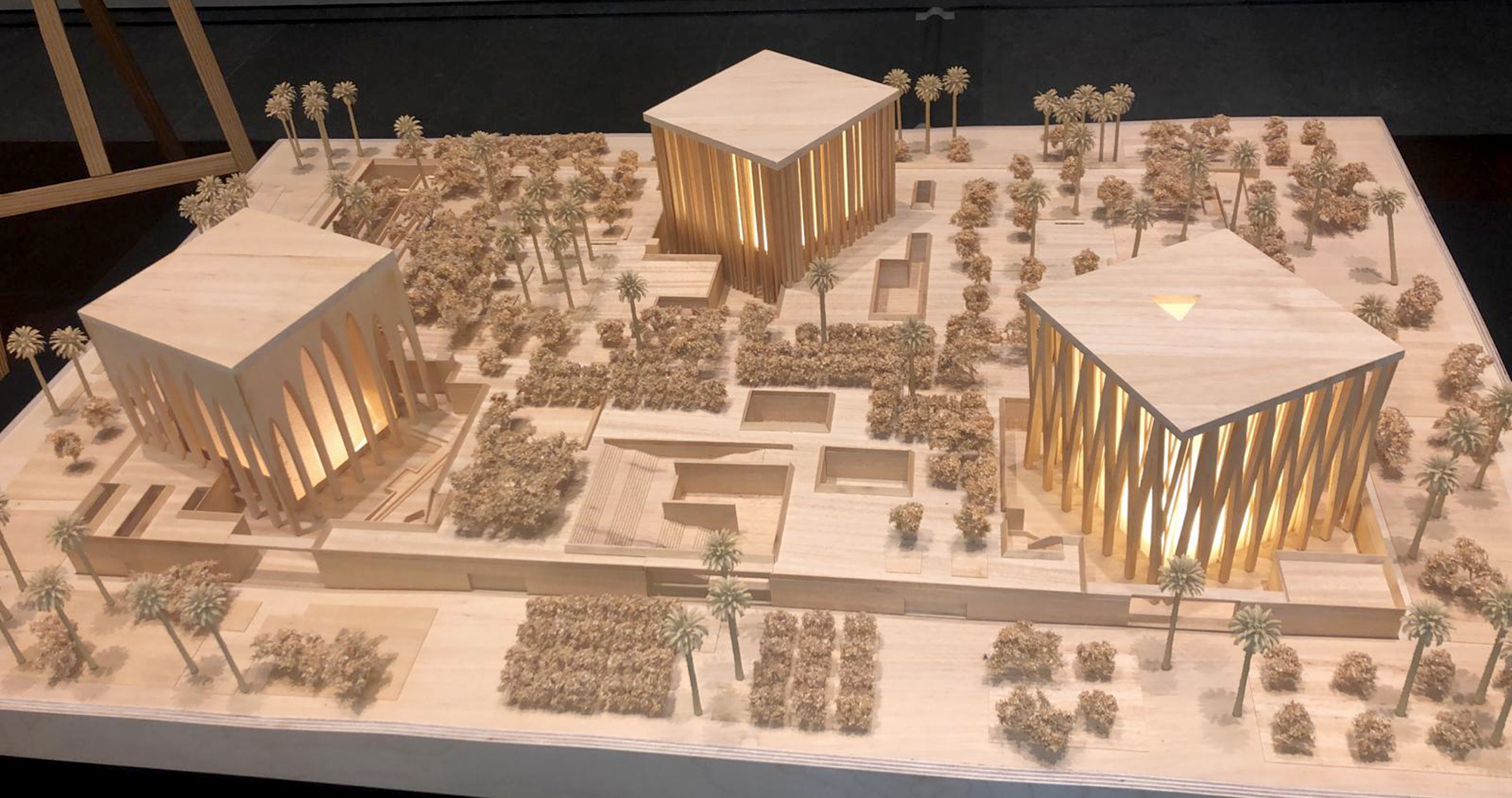
Model of the site and its three main buildings

The Abrahamic Family House aims to serve as a community for inter-religious dialogue and exchange and be a physical manifestation of the Document on Human Fraternity.

The complex seeks to represent interfaith co-existence, preserves the unique character of the religions represented and build bridges between human civilization and the Abrahamic messages.

The complex provides houses of worship and learning resources.

== Houses of worship ==
The complex contains a church, mosque, and a synagogue. Within each house of worship, visitors can observe religious service, listen to holy scriptures, and experience sacred rituals. The houses of worship were all inaugurated on 16 February 2023. All places of worship sit on non-denominational plinth where the complex's visitor centre is housed.

=== Eminence Ahmed El-Tayeb Mosque ===
The Eminence Ahmed El-Tayeb Mosque is named after Grand Imam of Al Azhar, Ahmed El-Tayeb, the leading authority on Sunni Islam. The design contains seven arches, a symbolic number in Islam. The prayer space can accommodate more than 300 people.

=== St. Francis Church ===
The St. Francis Church is named after the 13th century Catholic friar St. Francis of Assisi. The church is formally a Catholic church but open to all denominations.

=== Moses Ben Maimon Synagogue ===
The Moses Ben Maimon Synagogue is named after the 12th century Jewish philosopher and rabbinical scholar Moses Ben Maimon. It is the first in the UAE with a sanctuary, mikveh (ritual bath), and beit midrash (study hall).

== Design ==
The campus is designed by Ghanaian-British architect David Adjaye, founder of the design firm Adjaye Associates. Several architectural styles which are commonly found in mosques, churches, and synagogues are used, capturing shared values between Islam, Christianity, and Judaism. Each house of worship is intentionally built at the same height (30 meters each side) and dimensions but each has unique features.

The three cubic houses of worship sit upon a secular visitor pavilion, and aim to represent the diverse worshippers, residents, and visitors of Abu Dhabi. Adjaye highlighted that he wanted to “create a building that starts to dissolve the notion of hierarchical difference – it should represent universality and totality – something higher, that enhances the richness of human life". The design of this religious complex comprises three unaligned cubes sitting on a plinth, and each of them has a different orientation. The silhouette of the building makes the cubes look unified, and each of them is illustrated with colonnades, screens and vaults.

The site also includes a cultural center that will promote the values of mutual respect and peaceful coexistence while the unique character of each faith is preserved.

== Activities and programs ==
The Abrahamic Family House offers a variety events focused on faith, interfaith dialogue, communication, and promotion of peace. Events include Quran memorisation and correct recitation sessions and interfaith dialogue sessions with various academic scholars.

In partnership with Munich School of Philosophy, the Global Youth Ambassadors Programme is a year-long initiative where university students from the UAE can receive graduate-level course work on ethics and interfaith dialogue.

== In popular culture ==
The Abrahamic Family House inspired a symphony titled "Symphony of Three" composed by Ihab Darwish, John Debney and David Shire. The symphonic performance commissioned and produced by Abu Dhabi Festival, and co-produced by Ihab Darwish, Zofia Jeziorna and Robert Townson, brought together vocal ensembles, composers and musicians from Christian, Jewish and Muslim backgrounds to celebrate dialogue among different faiths.

== Gallery ==
Abrahamic Family House Complex

Exterior of Imam Al-Tayeb Mosque

Exterior of St. Francis Church

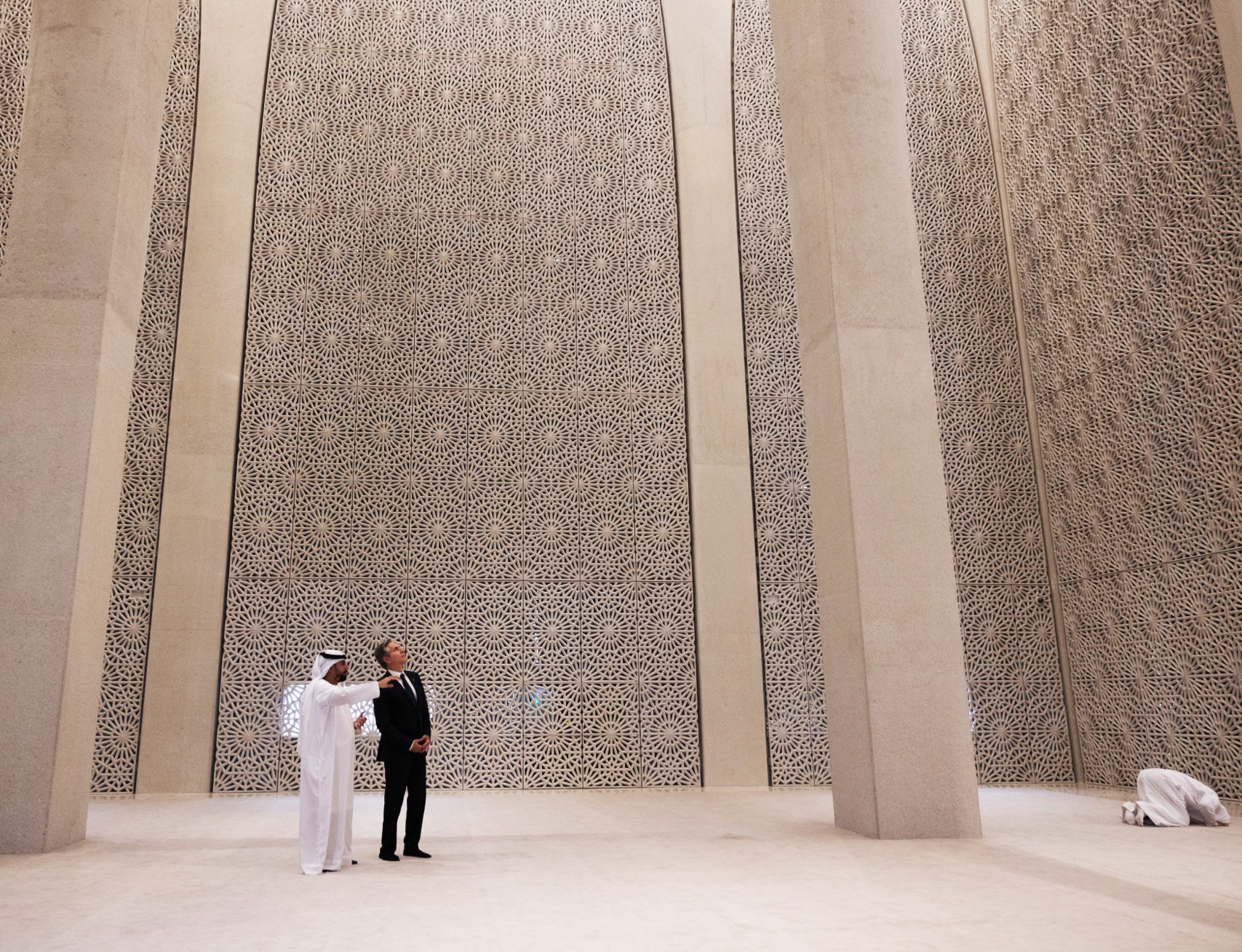
Interior of Imam Al-Tayeb Mosque

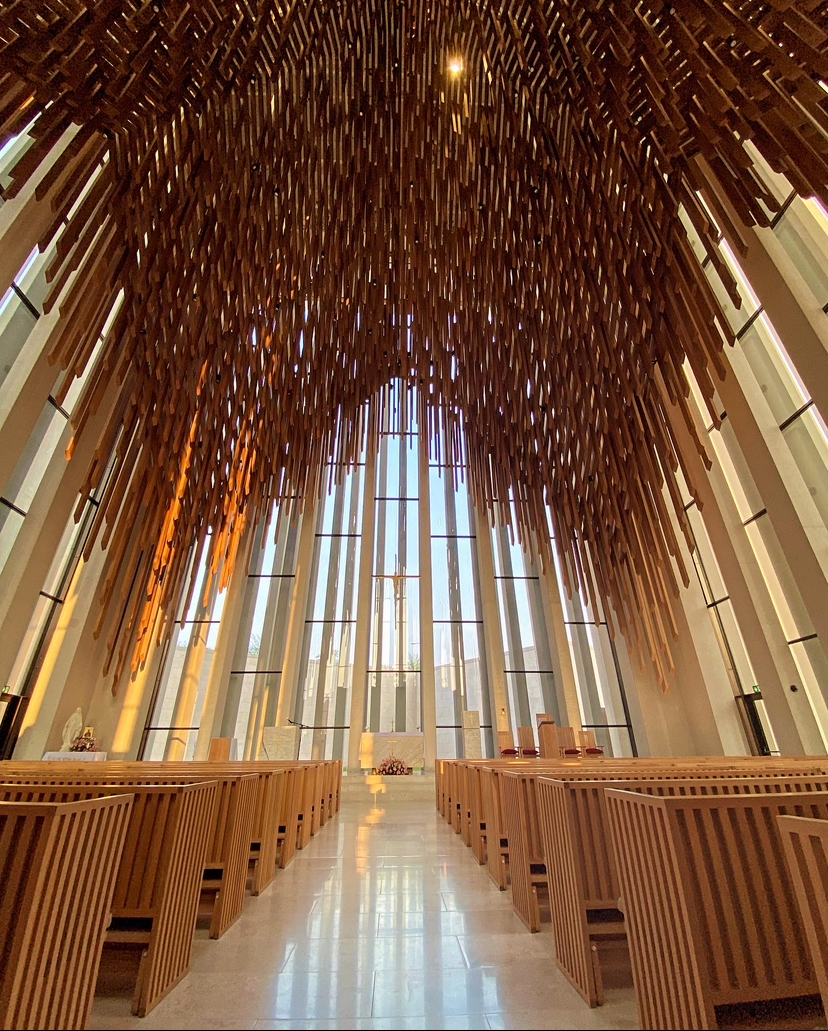
Interior of St. Francis Church
