= James Adjaye =

Ghanaian-British stem cell Scientist

Prof. James Adjaye
- Born: James Affram Adjaye; 12 November 1964 (age 61); Accra, Ghana
- Education: Accra Academy; John Kelly Boys High School; University College of Cardiff; King's College, London
- Occupations: Academic
- Scientific career
- Fields: Stem cell science; Regenerative Medicine; Cell biology
- Workplaces: Max Planck Institute for Molecular Genetics (1992-1995), (2002-present); University College of London (1996-2001); Heinrich Heine University Düsseldorf (2012-present)
- Relatives: David Adjaye (brother); Peter Adjaye (brother)

James Affram Adjaye is a Ghanaian British stem cell researcher. He is the Director of the Institute for Stem Cell Research and Regenerative Medicine at the Heinrich Heine University's faculty of medicine. He also leads the Molecular Embryology and Aging Group of the Max Planck Institute for Molecular Genetics situated in Berlin, Germany. Adjaye has contributed to multiple research publications on induced pluripotent stem cells.

== Early life and education ==
Adjaye had his secondary at the Accra Academy in Ghana, and John Kelly Boys High School in the United Kingdom. He proceeded to the University College of Cardiff where he obtained his Bachelor of Science degree in biochemistry in 1987. He then enrolled at the University of Sussex a year later for further studies in Biochemistry, there, he was awarded his Master of Science degree in biochemistry in 1989 under the supervision of Dr. Felicity Watts. For his doctorate degree, Adjaye enrolled at the King's College, London for his research in genetic manipulation and molecular biology spanning from 1989 to 1992. Adjaye's thesis was on cDNA cloning and immunological properties of a squid neurofilament gene homologue. Adjaye then joined the Max Planck Institute of Biophysical Chemistry in Goettingen, Germany in 1992 as a postdoctoral fellow. He worked in that capacity until 1995. In 1996, he had another postdoctoral fellowship at the Institute of Child Health, University College of London and remained there until 2001.

== Career ==
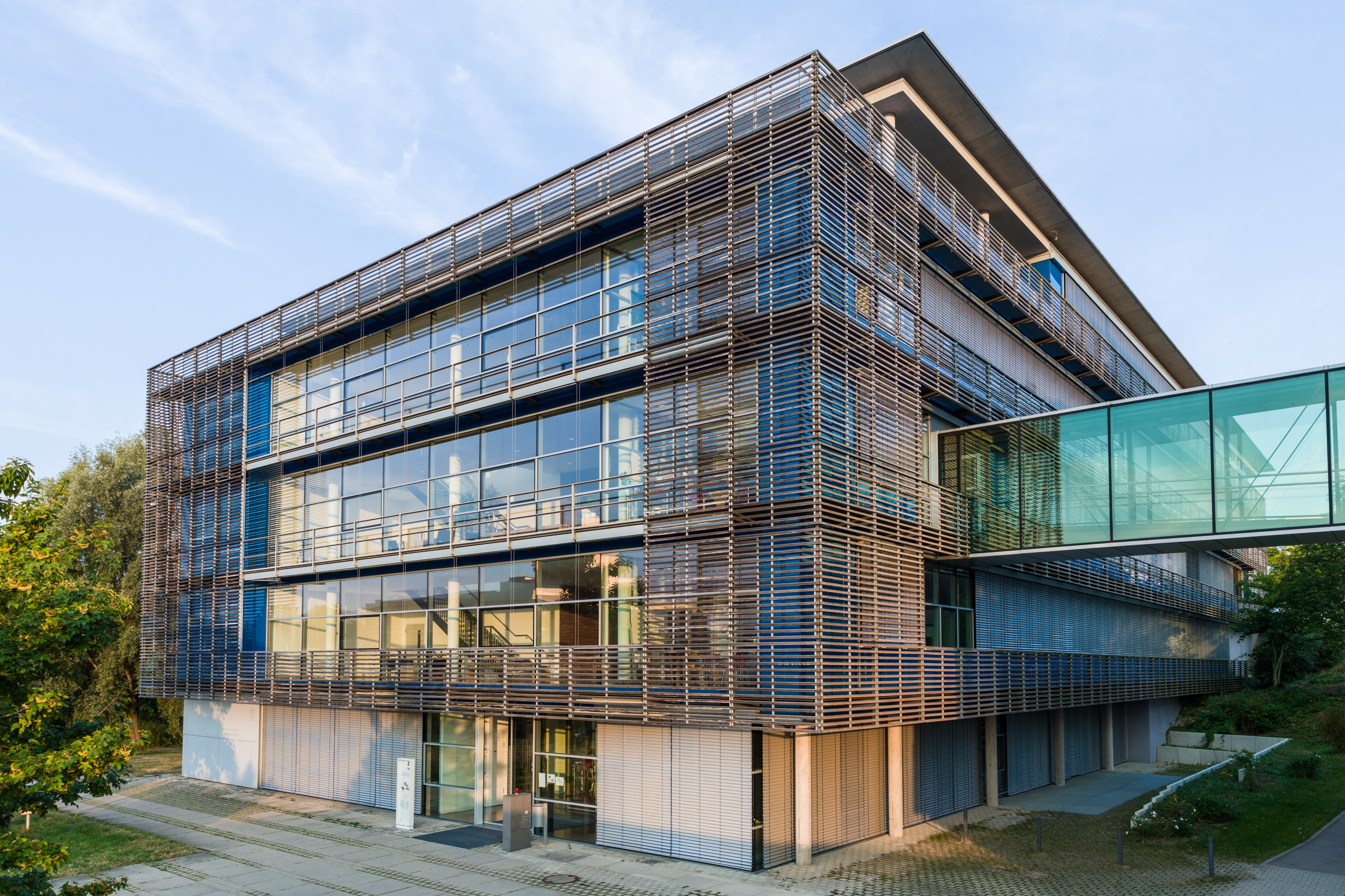
Max Planck Institute for Biology in Tübingen, Germany

A year after his postdoctoral fellowship at the Institute of Child Health, University College of London, Adjaye joined the Max Planck Institute of Molecular Genetics in Berlin as the group leader of the Molecular Embryology and Aging Group. He has worked in this capacity to date. In 2012, he became a professor at the Heinrich Heine University Düsseldorf. There, he is director of the Institute for Stem Cell Research and Regenerative Medicine of the university's Faculty of Medicine. He is the also the Chairs of Stem Cell Research and Regenerative Medicine.

== Research work and selected publications ==
Both nationally and internationally, Adjaye's research takes a systems biology approach. Using induced pluripotent stem cells, he models brain, liver, and kidney associated diseases such as Nijmegen Breakage Syndrome, Bilirubin-induced neuronal damage, Alzheimer's disease, and non-alcoholic fatty liver disease.

His works have been featured in journals such as the International Journal of Molecular Sciences, EMBO Reports, Stem Cell Research, Cell Reports, the Journal of Alzheimer's Disease, and BMC Genomics.

Some of his works include:

- (contrib.) Single cell data enables dissecting cell types present in bulk transcriptome data, 2024;
- (contrib.) Generation of two Alpha-I antitrypsin deficiency patient-derived induced pluripotent stem cell lines ISRM-AATD-iPSC-1 (HHUUKDi011-A) and ISRM-AATD-iPSC-2 (HHUUKDi012-A), 2023;
- (contrib.) Matrix Metalloproteinase 14 Mediates APP Proteolysis and Lysosomal Alterations Induced by Oxidative Stress in Human Neuronal Cells., 2020;
- (contrib.) IPSC-Derived Neuronal Cultures Carrying the Alzheimer's Disease Associated TREM2 R47H Variant Enables the Construction of an Aβ-Induced Gene Regulatory Network., 2020;
- (contrib.) AP-2 amyloidogenesis reduces by promoting BACE1 trafficking and degradation in neurons., 2020;
- (contrib.) Lymphoblast-derived integration-free iPSC line AD-TREM2-3 from a 74 year-old Alzheimer's disease patient expressing the TREM2 p.R47H variant., 2018;
- (contrib.) Modeling Late-Onset Sporadic Alzheimer's Disease through BMI1 Deficiency., 2018;
- (contrib.) Meta-analysis of human prefrontal cortex reveals activation of GFAP and decline of synaptic transmission in the aging brain., 2020;
- (contrib.) Lymphoblast-derived integration-free iPSC lines from a female and male Alzheimer's disease patient expressing different copy numbers of a coding CNV in the Alzheimer risk gene CR1., 2016;
- (contrib.) Chromosomal Instability and Molecular Defects in Induced Pluripotent Stem Cells from Nijmegen Breakage Syndrome Patients., 2016;
- (contrib.) Meta-Analysis of Transcriptome Data Related to Hippocampus Biopsies and iPSC-Derived Neuronal Cells from Alzheimer's Disease Patients Reveals an Association with FOXA1 and FOXA2 Gene Regulatory Networks., 2016;
- (contrib.) Induced pluripotent stem cell-derived neuronal cells from a sporadic Alzheimer's disease donor as a model for investigating AD-associated gene regulatory networks., 2015.

== Personal life ==
Prof. James Adjaye is married to Mrs. Theresa Adjaye who is by profession a Clinical Pharmacist/ Independent Prescriber specialising in cardiovascular disease. Together, they have 4 children.

He is the elder brother of the British architect Sir. David Adjaye and musician Peter Adjaye.
