= David Adjaye =

Ghanaian-British architect (born 1966)

Sir David Adjaye OM OBE RA
- Adjaye at Columbia University's GSAPP (2019)
- Born: David Frank Adjaye; 22 September 1966 (age 60); Dar es Salaam, Tanzania
- Education: Royal College of Art, London South Bank University
- Occupation: Architect
- Awards: 2021 Royal Gold Medal, 2021 Crystal Award, 2020 Isamu Noguchi Award
- Practice: Adjaye Associates
- Buildings: National Museum of African American History and Culture; 130 William; Abrahamic Family House; Skolkovo Moscow School of Management; Rivington Place; Francis A. Gregory Neighborhood Library
- Website: adjaye.com

Sir David Frank Adjaye (born 22 September 1966) is a Ghanaian-British architect who has designed many notable buildings around the world, including the National Museum of African American History and Culture in Washington, D.C. Adjaye was knighted in the 2017 New Year Honours for services to architecture. He received the 2021 Royal Gold Medal, making him the first African recipient and one of the youngest recipients. He was appointed to the Order of Merit in 2022.

== Early life and education ==
Adjaye was born in Dar es Salaam, Tanzania. The son of a Ghanaian diplomat, he lived in Tanzania, Egypt, Yemen and Lebanon before moving to Britain at the age of nine. Upon graduating from London South Bank University with a BA degree in architecture in 1990, he won the RIBA Bronze Medal for the best undergraduate design project in the UK (the Respite project). In 1993 he graduated from a master's programme at the Royal College of Art.

== Career ==
=== Early projects ===
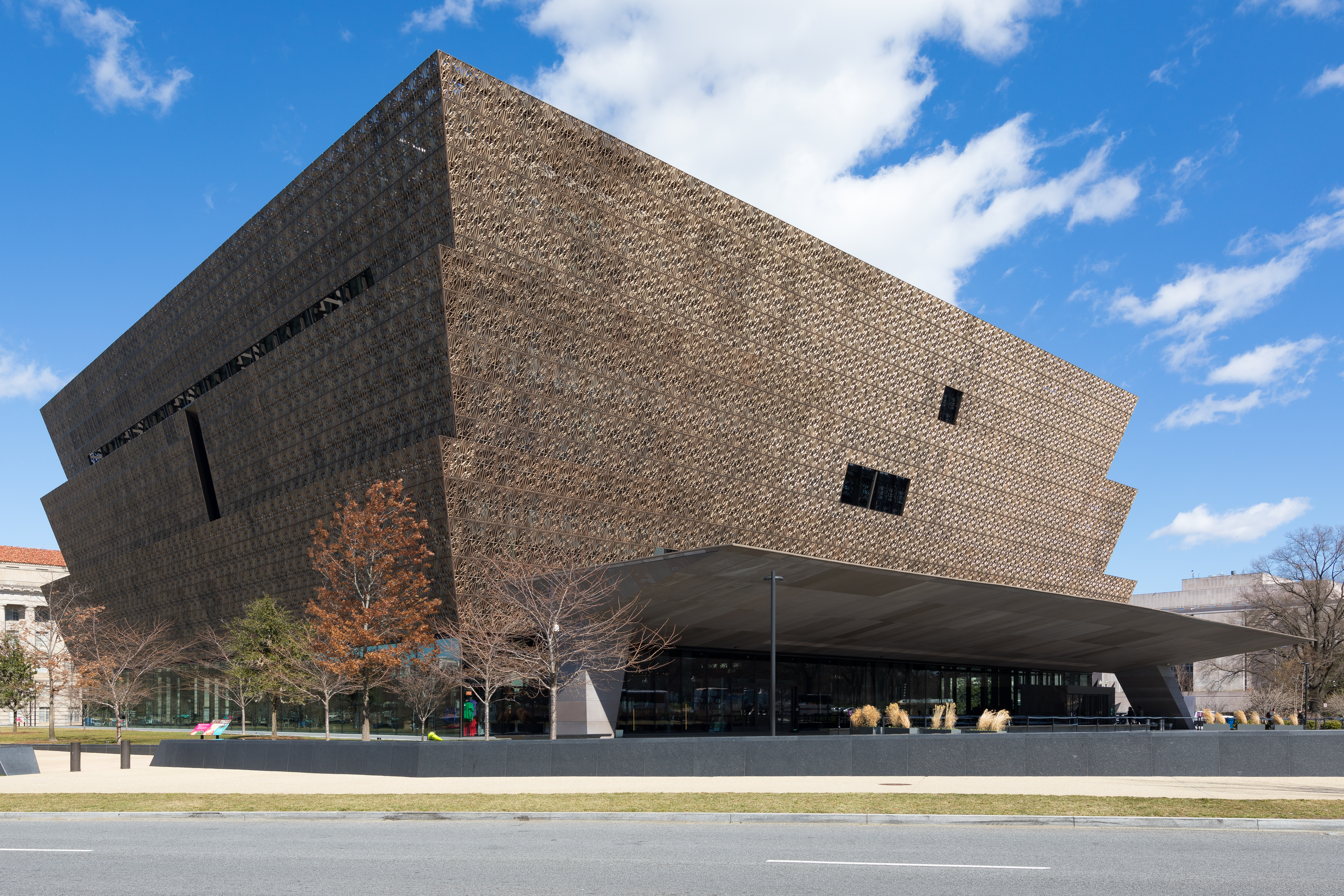
National Museum of African American History and Culture, Washington, D.C.

Abrahamic Family House, Abu Dhabi

Adjaye's early works include many residential projects, including Chris Ofili's house in 1999, Dirty House and Glass House in 2002, and Lorna Simpson's studio-home in 2006. He then moved on to larger scale projects such as the Idea Store in Whitechapel, UK, and the Nobel Peace Center in Oslo, Norway, in 2005.

The studio's first solo exhibition, David Adjaye: Making Public Buildings, was shown at the Whitechapel Gallery in London in January 2006, with Thames and Hudson publishing the catalogue of the same name. This followed their 2005 publication of Adjaye's first book, David Adjaye Houses.

Other prominent early works include the Bernie Grant Arts Centre and the Stephen Lawrence Centre in 2007.

=== Major works ===
Adjaye was selected to design the Museum of Contemporary Art Denver, which opened in 2007. The building, Adjaye's first museum commission, was designed to minimize boundaries between the exterior spaces of the city and the interior galleries of the museum. Hidden skylights fill the interior spaces with natural light, and large windows look out on the city streets. The building has five galleries as well as dedicated education spaces, a shop, library and rooftop café.

Adjaye won a competition to design the Moscow School of Management Skolkovo which was completed in 2010. Rejecting the traditional campus-style, the building is designed as one form to encourage student interaction.

Adjaye designed two new neighbourhood libraries in Washington, D.C.: the Francis A. Gregory Neighborhood Library and the Bellevue / William O. Lockridge Library, which opened in 2012. The award-winning libraries are celebrated for being community beacons.

In 2015, the Aishti Foundation, a mixed art gallery and retail space, opened in Beirut, Lebanon. The gallery space is over 40,000 square feet. Adjaye's design marries art viewing with shopping, two seemingly conflicting experiences.

On 15 April 2009, Adjaye was selected lead architect for the team of architects, which includes the Freelon Group, Davis Brody Bond and SmithGroup, to design the new $540 million National Museum of African American History and Culture, a Smithsonian Institution museum, on the National Mall in Washington, D.C. His design features a crown motif from Yoruba sculpture. The museum opened in the fall of 2016 and was named "the cultural event of the year" by The New York Times. It was also the subject of a profile on the Sky Arts programme The Art of Architecture in 2019. Furniture that Adjaye designed for the museum is manufactured and sold by Knoll.

In 2007, artist Linda Pace reached out to Adjaye to design a contemporary art centre for her art collection shortly before she died from breast cancer that year. Ruby City, located in San Antonio, Texas, opened in 2019.

In 2018, 1199SEIU President George Gresham reached out to Adjaye, who later accepted the commission to design the new 16,500-square-foot member space. The designed featured hundreds of photos gathered from the union's vast photo archive and placed on ceramic tiles produced by Cerámica Suro in Guadalajara, Mexico. The 1199SEIU United Healthcare Workers East is located in New York, New York, and was completed in 2020. The designed was named Architect's Newspaper Best of Design for Interior Workplace in 2020.

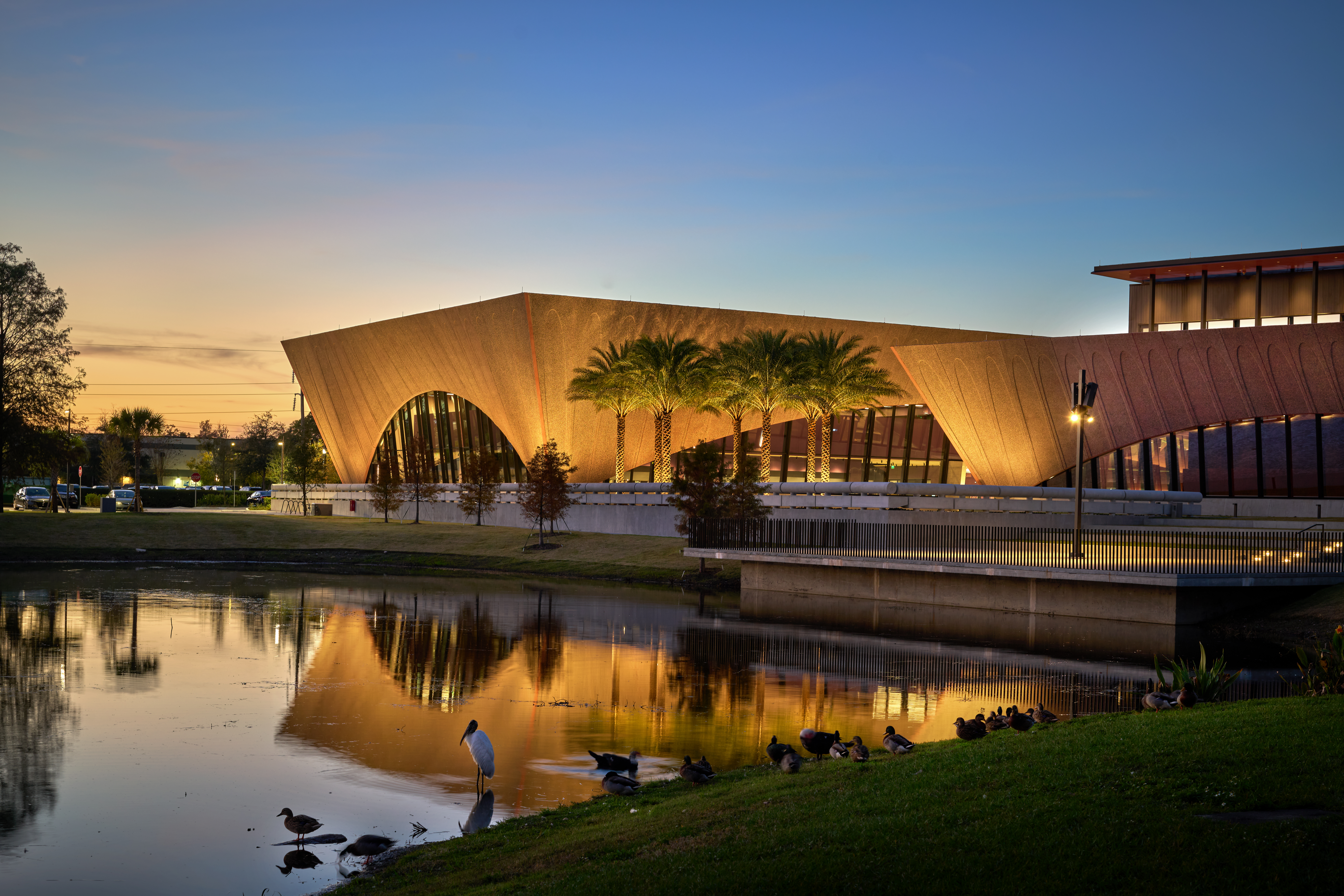
Winter Park Library & Events Center

In 2017, Adjaye in conjunction with HuntonBrady Architects revealed the design of the Winter Park Library and Events Center in Winter Park, Florida. The library officially opened to the public on 13 December 2021. In 2022, it was the Jury Winner in the Library Category for the Architizer A+ Awards.

In 2023, Adjaye's first permanent public sculpture, titled Asaase III was unveiled. The artwork is located at The Griot Museum of Black History in St. Louis, Missouri, and was commissioned by curator Allison Glenn for the 2023 Counterpublic triennial.

=== Other commissions ===
Alongside his international commissions, Adjaye's work spans exhibitions, private homes and furniture. He built homes for the designer Alexander McQueen, artist Jake Chapman, photographer Jürgen Teller, actor Ewan McGregor, and artists Tim Noble and Sue Webster. For artist Chris Ofili, he designed a new studio and a beach house in Port of Spain, Trinidad.

Adjaye is also known for his collaborations with contemporary artists on installations and exhibitions. He worked with Ofili to create an environment for The Upper Room, which was later acquired by Tate Britain and caused a nationwide media debate. Adjaye collaborated with artist Olafur Eliasson to create a light installation, Your black horizon, at the 2005 Venice Biennale. He has also worked on the art project Sankalpa with director Shekhar Kapur. In May 2019, the Ghana Freedom Pavilion – designed by Adjaye – was inaugurated at the 58th Venice Art Biennale. He also designed the 56th Venice Art Biennale with the late curator Okwui Enwezor; the River Reading Room for the Gwangju Biennale; and the Sclera Pavilion for the London Design Festival.

Adjaye co-authored two seasons of the BBC's Dreamspaces television series and hosts a BBC radio programme. In June 2005, he presented the documentary Building Africa: Architecture of a Continent. In 2008, he participated in Manifesta 7 and the Gwangju Biennale. Making Place: The Architecture of David Adjaye was on display at the Art Institute of Chicago from September 2015 to January 2016. In November 2020, Adjaye published his early portfolio in his book titled Adjaye Works 1995–2007: Houses, Pavilions, Installations, Buildings with Peter Allison and Thames & Hudson. In September 2022, Adjaye published his continued portfolio in his latest book titled Adjaye Works 2007 - 2015: Houses, Pavilions, Installations, Buildings with Peter Allison and Thames & Hudson.

=== Recent work ===
In 2015, Adjaye was commissioned to design a new home for the Studio Museum in Harlem.

In March 2018, Adjaye Associates' designs for the National Cathedral of Ghana were unveiled by Ghanaian president Nana Addo Dankwa Akufo-Addo.

In September 2020, Adjaye unveiled his designs for the Princeton University Art Museum (project completed, and museum open to the public October 31, 2025.) That same year, he also unveiled his designs for the Thabo Mbeki Presidential Library as well as The Martyrs Memorial in Niamey, Niger.

In November 2020, Adjaye revealed his vision for the Museum of West African Art which will be built in Benin City, Nigeria. Adjaye Associates' building will house historic art and artefacts as well as incorporate galleries dedicated to contemporary arts.

In 2021, Adjaye revealed his design for the District Hospitals project across Ghana, Accra and The Africa Institute in Sharjah, UAE.

In April 2021, the Cherry Groce Memorial Pavilion was completed in Brixton. Commissioned by the Cherry Groce Foundation, the memorial is in honour of Cherry Groce, who was shot in her home by the Metropolitan Police in front of her children on 28 September 1985, sparking the 1985 Brixton riot.

In September 2022, the W. E. B. Du Bois Museum Foundation unveiled the plans and renderings for the new W. E. B. Du Bois Museum Complex in Accra, Ghana, designed by Adjaye.

In October 2022, Grinnell College Board of Trustees approved construction of the new Civic Engagement Quad Core Project designed by Adjaye, slated to open in fall 2024.

His other recent works include interiors for the SEIU 1199 Healthcare Workers' East in New York City, The Webster in Los Angeles, California (2020), Mole House in London, UK (2019), Ruby City in San Antonio, Texas (2019), McCarter Switching Station in Newark, New Jersey (2018), Sugar Hill Mixed-Use Development in Harlem, New York (2015), Alara Concept Store in Lagos, Nigeria (2015), Aïshti Foundation in Beirut, Lebanon (2015).

His design for the Abrahamic Family House on Saadiyat Island in Abu Dhabi, UAE, opened in 2023. It is inspired by the Document on Human Fraternity and has a mosque, church, and synagogue, celebrating the three major Abrahamic religions. It also includes a cultural center which promotes the values of mutual respect and peaceful coexistence.

In July 2023, developer Hondo withdrew its planning application for an Adjaye Associates-designed 22-storey tower in Brixton, south London, days before a Greater London Authority hearing. The 98m-tall block received over 1,000 objections from locals and was criticised for its prominence in a mostly low-rise area.

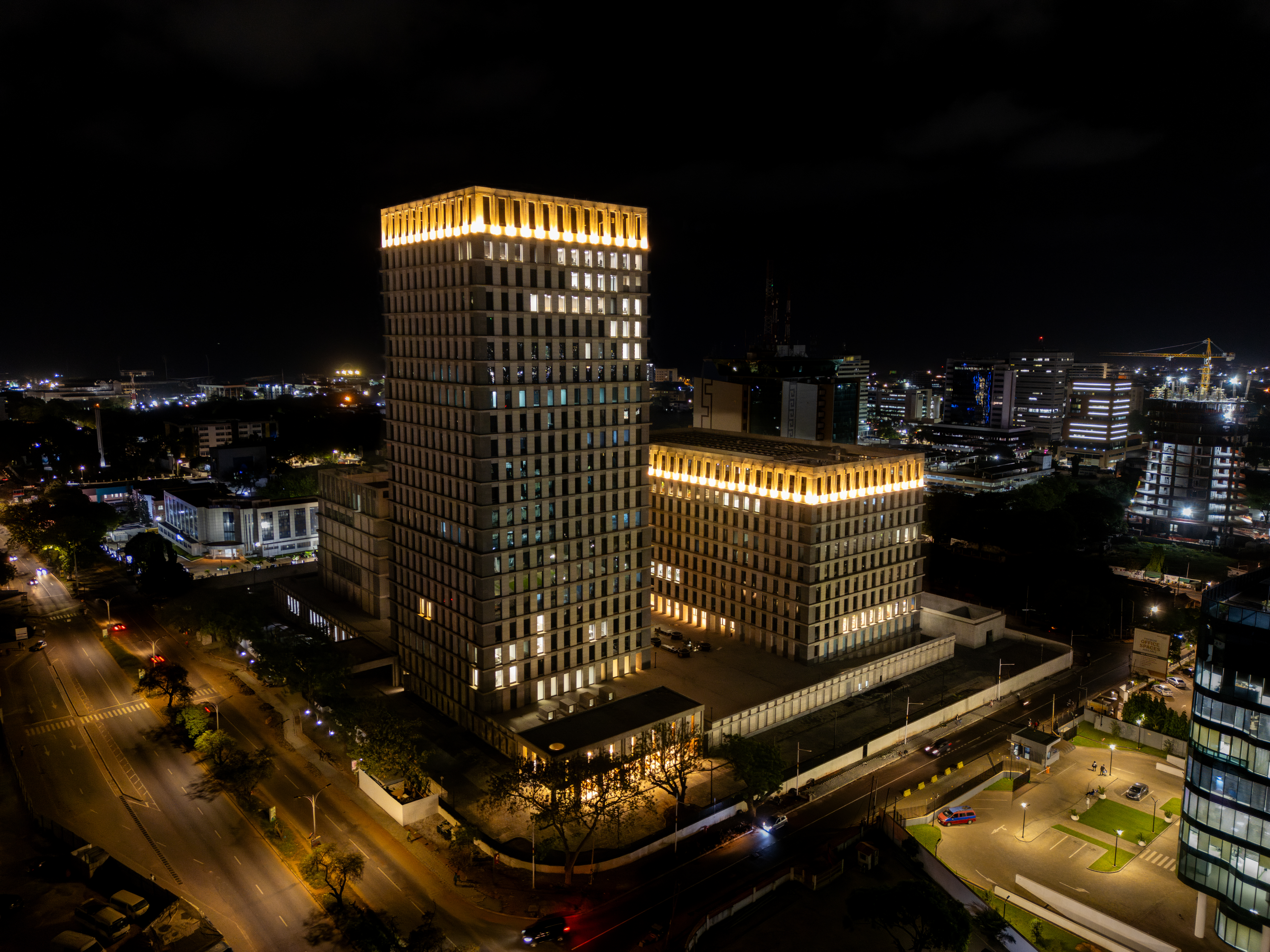
Bank Square, Bank of Ghana, Accra designed by Adjaye Associates

In 2024 the Bank of Ghana inaugurated The Bank Square in Accra, designed by Adjaye Associates. Ghanaian politician Gabby Otchere Darko called the building "one of the most impressive financial houses in the whole of Africa".

In January 2025, the government of Ghana launched an investigation into the funding of the unbuilt National Cathedral of Ghana in Accra, designed by Adjaye's studio. According to reports, $58 million of taxpayer's money has been spent on the $400 million cathedral despite construction not starting.

In October 2025, the new building of the Princeton University Art Museum was opened, after four years of construction, in cooperation with Cooper Robertson.

=== Firm operations ===
Adjaye established his practice in 2000 as Adjaye Associates. The firm now operates globally with offices in Accra, London, and New York and has completed projects in Europe, North America, the Middle East, Asia, and Africa.

In March 2024, the practice announced the appointment of three new CEOs to lead Adjaye Associates' three global studios – described as a 'fundamental change'. The three CEOs, Lucy Tilley, Pascale Sablan and Kofi Bio, lead each of the Adjaye Associates' three global studios in London, New York, and Accra. Adjaye was named the executive chair of the group and remains as principal architect of the firm leading design direction.

In March 2025, the practice reported a pre-tax loss of £720,000 (down from a £2.5m profit the previous year) for the year ending 31 December 2023. Turnover dropped over £3 million from £20.4m to £17.1m. The accounts covered the period when sexual misconduct allegations were made against David Adjaye, and when the firm made redundancies, reducing its payroll from 110 to 85. In the year to 31 December 2024, pre-tax losses grew to £1.8 million as turnover fell by almost two thirds to £6.4 million. Headcount dropped to 47, with the number of architects on the payroll almost halving to 32.

=== Sexual assault allegations ===
In 2023, Adjaye faced allegations of sexual assault and harassment by three women who had worked in his practice; he denied the allegations and no charges were brought against him. He did apologise for what he called "mistakes" where he had "blurred the boundaries" between his professional and personal lives. He subsequently resigned from his role as architectural adviser to the Mayor of London, removed himself from involvement in the Holocaust memorial in Britain although Adjaye Associates continue as lead architect, the Africa Institute in Sharjah cancelled a major new campus project, and his practice was dropped from a £57 million project at Liverpool's International Slavery Museum.

Following the allegations and clients withdrawing projects from Adjaye's practice, the business was reported to have begun a redundancy programme. Former employees also complained of a 'toxic' workplace culture at the practice. Adjaye Associates commissioned an independent workplace review from a leading employment KC following the complaints and have publicly said that they have made significant changes including restructuring the firm's governance with the stated intention of becoming an exceptional workplace.

=== Academic appointments ===
Adjaye was the first Louis Kahn visiting professor at the University of Pennsylvania, and was the Kenzo Tange Professor in Architecture at Harvard Graduate School of Design. In addition, he is a RIBA Chartered Member, an AIA Honorary Fellow, a Foreign Honorary Member of the American Academy of Arts and Letters, and a Senior Fellow of the Design Futures Council. He is a member of the Advisory Council of the Barcelona Institute of Architecture and also serves as member of the Advisory Boards of the Barcelona Institute of Architecture and the LSE Cities Programme.

== Personal life ==
David Adjaye is a younger brother of stem cell scientist James Adjaye.

In January 2014, Adjaye married Ashley Shaw-Scott in London's St Paul's Cathedral. Chris Ofili was his best man.

Adjaye has also worked on numerous collaborative projects with his brother Peter Adjaye, a musician.

In 2018, along with Bono and Theaster Gates, Adjaye curated the third (RED) auction in Miami to support the Global Fund's work against AIDS, raising a total $10.5 million, including matching funds by the Bill & Melinda Gates Foundation.

== Awards and honours ==
In 2006, Adjaye was shortlisted for the Stirling Prize for the Whitechapel Idea Store, built on the remains of a 1960s mall. He was appointed Officer of the Order of the British Empire (OBE) in 2007 for services to British architecture. In 2016 he received the Massachusetts Institute of Technology's McDermott award, a $100,000 prize for excellence in the arts. That same year, he was elected to the American Philosophical Society. Adjaye was knighted in the 2017 New Year Honours for services to architecture. In 2018, Adjaye received the Washington University International Humanities Medal. In 2019, he was a member of the Prix Versailles World Judges Panel. In October 2020 Adjaye was announced as the RIBA Royal Gold Medal winner for 2021, awarded annually by the Royal Institute of British Architects on behalf of the British monarch, in recognition of an individual's or group's substantial contribution to international architecture.

- RIBA Bronze Medal for Architecture Students – 1990
- Design Futures Council Senior Fellow
- Design Miami/ Designer of the Year Award – 2011
- Powerlist: Britain's Most Influential Black Person – 2012
- Eugene McDermott Award in the Arts at MIT – 2016
- Time magazine's 100 Most Influential People – 2017
- Ghana Legacy Honors Impact in Architecture Award
- AJ100 Contribution to the Profession Award – 2018
- Thomas Jefferson Memorial Award – 2018
- Louis I. Khan Memorial Award – 2018
- Isamu Noguchi Award from the Noguchi Museum. – 2020
- RIBA Royal Gold Medal – 2021
- Crystal Award – 2021
- Charlotte Perriand Award – 2022
- TIME100 Impact Award – 2022
- Order of Merit – 2022.
