= Document on Human Fraternity =

Statement by Pope Francis and Sheikh Ahmed el-Tayeb

The Document on Human Fraternity for World Peace and Living Together, also known as the Abu Dhabi declaration or Abu Dhabi agreement, is a joint statement signed by Pope Francis of the Catholic Church and Sheikh Ahmed el-Tayeb, Grand Imam of Al-Azhar, on 4 February 2019 in Abu Dhabi, United Arab Emirates, supporting human compassion and solidarity. The document was born of a discussion between Francis and Tayeb, and is concerned with how different faiths can live peacefully in the same world, and it is meant to be a guide on advancing a "culture of mutual respect."

The Higher Committee of Human Fraternity was created to fulfill the aspirations of the Document on Human Fraternity internationally. The principles of compassion and human solidarity embodied in this text are the same ones that later inspired the declaration designating 4 February as the International Day of Human Fraternity, as indicated by UN Secretary-General António Guterres.

In his 2020 encyclical Fratelli tutti, Pope Francis stated that the Document on Human Fraternity "was no mere diplomatic gesture, but a reflection born of dialogue and common commitment."

== History ==
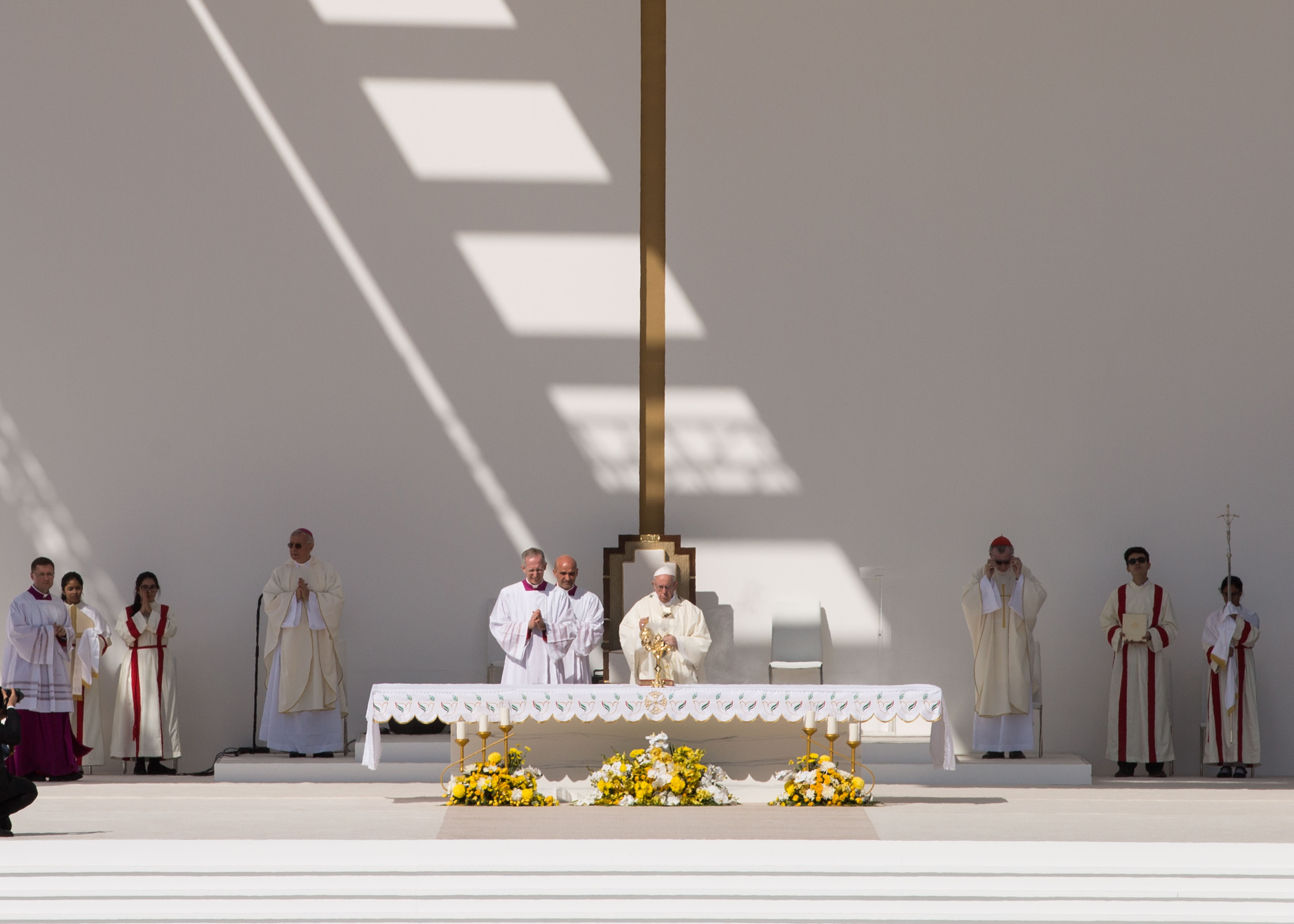
Pope Francis in the UAE

In February 2019, the Muslim Council of Elders hosted the Human Fraternity Meeting in the UAE with hopes of enhancing co-existence of humans globally. Pope Francis traveled to the United Arab Emirates from 3–5 February 2019 and met with Islamic leaders. On 4 February 2019, at the Founder's Memorial in Abu Dhabi, the Document on Human Fraternity for World Peace and Living Together was co-signed by Pope Francis and the Grand Imam of Al-Azhar, Ahmad al-Tayyeb.

== Details ==
The Document is concerned with how different faiths can live peaceably in the same world and areas. In the declaration:

- Francis and Tayeb "declare the adoption of a culture of dialogue as the path; mutual cooperation as the code of conduct; reciprocal understanding as the method and standard."
- they called on world leaders "to work strenuously to spread the culture of tolerance and of living together in peace; to intervene at the earliest opportunity to stop the shedding of innocent blood and bring an end to wars, conflicts, environmental decay and the moral and cultural decline that the world is presently experiencing."
- they asked leaders and would-be influencers "to rediscover the values of peace, justice, goodness, beauty, human fraternity and coexistence in order to confirm the importance of these values as anchors of salvation for all, and to promote them everywhere."

The document also referred to, and condemned terrorism, stating that

Terrorism is deplorable and threatens the security of people, be they in the East or the West, the North or the South, and disseminates panic, terror and pessimism, but this is not due to religion, even when terrorists instrumentalize it. It is due, rather, to an accumulation of incorrect interpretations of religious texts and to policies linked to hunger, poverty, injustice, oppression and pride.

== Response and criticism ==
The United Nations General Assembly unanimously decided to observe an International Day of Human Fraternity on 4 February each year, starting in 2021. It was the signing of the Document on Human Fraternity which inspired this date to be observed as such.

=== Diversity of religions ===
Some commentary on the Document focuses on alleged "novel theological formulations ... and questionable assertions of facts", (Note: "[T]here are some pronouncements about God's will in it that are nowhere to be found ... in the gospels.") particularly in a passage concerning God's will with regard to the diversity of religions:

Freedom is a right of every person: each individual enjoys the freedom of belief, thought, expression and action. The pluralism and the diversity of religions, colour, sex, race and language are willed by God in His wisdom, through which He created human beings. This divine wisdom is the source from which the right to freedom of belief and the freedom to be different derives. Therefore, the fact that people are forced to adhere to a certain religion or culture must be rejected, as too the imposition of a cultural way of life that others do not accept.

Chad Pecknold, a systematic theologian at the Catholic University of America, assesses this claim as "fitting [...] [i]n sensitive inter-religious contexts, [...] but some may find it puzzling to hear the Vicar of Christ talk about God willing the diversity of religions". However, Pecknold clarifies that "in the context of the document, the Holy Father is clearly referring not to the evil of many false religions, but positively refers to the diversity of religions only in the sense that they are evidence of our natural desire to know God." Athanasius Schneider, Auxiliary Bishop of Astana, claims that Pope Francis also clarified to him that he was referring to "the permissive will of God".

Nevertheless, on 10 June 2019, Cardinals Raymond Leo Burke and Jānis Pujats, Archbishops Tomasz Peta and Jan Paweł Lenga and Bishop Schneider published a 40-point "Declaration of Truths", stating that "the religion born of faith in Jesus Christ" is the "only religion positively willed by God".

== See also ==
- Abrahamic Family House
- Nostra aetate
- Catholic social teaching
- Extra Ecclesiam nulla salus
- Fratelli tutti
- Christianity and Islam
- Catholic Church and Islam
- Human rights in the Quran
- International Day of Human Fraternity
- Parliament of the World's Religions
