= Higher Committee of Human Fraternity =

International organization

- اللجنة العليا للأخوة الإنسانية
- Abbreviation: HCHF
- Named after: Document on Human Fraternity
- Formation: August 15, 2019; 6 years ago
- Type: International organization
- Purpose: Human Fraternity
- Co-chair: Miguel Ángel Ayuso Guixot
- Co-chair: Mohamed Hussein Mahrasawi
- Secretary General: Mohamed Abdelsalam
- Website: www.forhumanfraternity.org

The Higher Committee of Human Fraternity (HCHF) is an independent body of world religious, academic and cultural leaders created on 15 August 2019 based on the Document on Human Fraternity signed by the Pope Francis and Ahmed el-Tayeb. The aim of the committee is to implement the purposes set out in the Document on Human Fraternity at the international level.

== History ==
Pope Francis, head of the Catholic Church, and Ahmed Al-Tayeb, Grand Imam of Al-Azhar, signed the Document on Human Fraternity for World Peace and Living Together on 4 February 2019 in Abu Dhabi, UAE. In order to establish the objectives outlined in the document, the Higher Committee of Human Fraternity was created.

== Initiatives ==
=== Zayed Award for Human Fraternity ===
Awarded on 4 February, the International Day for Human Fraternity, it is an independent annual global award which includes a financial prize of 1 million USD. The award recognizes individuals, organizations, and other entities for their contributions to human fraternity. The winners are honored at a ceremony in Abu Dhabi. The award is named after Sheikh Zayed bin Sultan Al Nahyan, founder of the United Arab Emirates.

=== International Day of Human Fraternity ===
This day commemorates the signing of the Document on Human Fraternity on 4 February 2019. On 21 December 2020, the United Nations General Assembly proclaimed 4 February as International Day of Human Fraternity. Since its inception, different world leaders such as Pope Francis, Sheikh Ahmed el-Tayeb, Grand Imam of Al-Azhar, and former President of the United States, Joe Biden, have supported the initiative.

=== Human Fraternity Education and Leadership for Peace (HELP) ===
This program aims at improving human fraternity amongst the youth in the world by building their ability to critically analyze problems, to promote human fraternity spirit, and foster fraternity through long-lasting solutions.

=== Women Initiatives ===
These initiatives shed light on the challenges women face in the world while exploring solutions to support women locally and internationally. The first Women's Forum was held on 8 March 2021.

== Members ==
Name		Position	Picture	Another post
1	Miguel Ángel Ayuso Guixot	Co-chair	No Frame	President of the Pontifical Council for Interreligious Dialogue of the Holy See
2	Mohamed Hussein Mahrasawi	Co-chair		President of Al-Azhar University
3	Mohamed Mahmoud Abdelsalam	Secretary General		The Grand Imam of Al-Azhar
4	M. Bruce Lustig	Member		Chief Rabbi in Washington Hebrew Congregation
5	Mohammed Khalifa Al Mubarak	Member		Head of the Department of Culture and Tourism, Abu Dhabi
6	Irina Bokova	Member	No Frame	Director-General former United Nations Educational, Scientific and Cultural Organization
7	Sultan Faisal Al Remeithi	Member		Secretary General Muslim Council of Elders
8	Monsignor Younes Lahzi Kayed	Member	No Frame	Personal Secretary Ex Pope Francis
9	Yasser Hareb	Member	No Frame	Writer TV anchor Emirati
10	Leymah Gbowee	Member	No Frame	Peace Activist and Recipient of the Nobel Peace Prize
11	Ioan Sauca	Member		Secretary General of World Council of Churches
