= Interfaith dialogue initiatives =

Throughout the world there are local, regional, national and international interfaith initiatives; many are formally or informally linked and constitute larger networks or federations. Interfaith dialogue forms a major role in the study of religion and peace-building.

A 2014 article in The Huffington Post stated "religious intolerance is still a concern that threatens to undermine the hard work of devoted activists over the decades". The article expressed hope that continuing "interfaith dialogue can change this".

== 19th-century initiatives ==
Israel Jacobson, a layman and pioneer in the development of what emerged as Reform Judaism, established a religious school in Sessen, Germany, in 1801 that initially had 40 Jewish and 20 Christian students. "Jacobson's innovation of a 'mixed' student body reflected his hopes for a radiant future between Jews and Christians."

The 1893 Parliament of World Religions at the World's Columbian Exposition in Chicago, Illinois, is "often regarded as the birth of the interfaith movement". The congress was the first organized, international gathering of religious leaders. Since its first meeting in 1893, there have been eight meetings including one in 2015.

Moravian born Rabbi Isaac Mayer Wise, who founded the Reform movement in the United States, sought close relations with Christian church leaders. To that end, he published a series of lectures in 1883 entitled "Judaism and Christianity: Their Agreements and Disagreements". Wise emphasized what he believed linked the two religions in an inextricable theological and human bond: the biblical "Sinaitic revelation" as "... the acknowledged law of God".

== 20th-century initiatives ==
In 1900, the International Association for Religious Freedom (IARF) was founded under a name different from its current one. In 1987, its statement of purpose was revised to include advancing "understanding, dialogue and readiness to learn and promotes sympathy and harmony among the different religious traditions". In 1990, its membership was enlarged "to include all the world's major religious groups". In 1996, IARF's World Congress included representatives of Palestinian and Israeli IARF groups and Muslim participants made presentations.

In December 1914, just after World War I began, a group of Christians gathered in Cambridge, England to found the Fellowship of Reconciliation (FOR) "in hopes of bringing people of faith together to promote peace, and it went on to become a leading interfaith voice for non-violence and non-discrimination". It has branches and affiliated groups in over 50 countries on every continent. The membership includes "Jews, Christians, Buddhists, Muslims, Indigenous religious practitioners, Baháʼí, and people of other faith traditions, as well as those with no formal religious affiliation".

In 1936, the World Congress of Faiths (WCF) formed in London. It is "one of the oldest interfaith bodies in the world". One of its purposes is to bring "people of faith together to enrich their understandings of their own and others' traditions". It does this by offering opportunities "to meet, explore, challenge and understand different faith traditions through events from small workshops to large conferences, partnership working, online conversation, and publications".

In 1949, following the devastation of World War II, the Fellowship In Prayer was founded in 1949 by Carl Allison Evans and Kathryn Brown. Evans believed that unified prayer would "bridge theological or structural religious differences", would "open the mind and heart of the prayer to a new understanding of and appreciation for the beliefs and values of those following different spiritual paths", and would "advance interfaith understanding and mutual respect among religious traditions",

Rabbi Leo Baeck, the leader of the German Jewish community who survived his incarceration in the Terezin concentration camp, offered these words in his 1949 presidential address to the World Union for Progressive Judaism in London: "...as in a great period of the Middle Ages, [Jews and Muslims] are ...almost compelled to face each other... not only in the sphere of policy [the State of Israel in the Middle East], but also in the sphere of religion; there is the great hope... they will ...meet each other on joint roads, in joint tasks, in joint confidences in the future. There is the great hope that Judaism can thus become the builder of a bridge, the 'pontifex' between East and West."

In 1952, the International Humanist and Ethical Union (IHEU) was founded in Amsterdam. It serves as "the sole world umbrella organisation embracing Humanist, atheist, rationalist, secularist, skeptic, laique, ethical cultural, freethought and similar organisations world-wide". IHEU's "vision is a Humanist world; a world in which human rights are respected and everyone is able to live a life of dignity". It implements its vision by seeking "to influence international policy through representation and information, to build the humanist network, and let the world know about the worldview of Humanism".

Between 1956 and 1964, the Benedictine monastery of Toumliline hosted conferences called "International Meetings" which hosted Christian, Jewish and Muslim scholars such as Louis Massignon, Emmanuel Levinas and Seyyed Hossein Nasr.

In 1958, the Center for the Study of World Religions (CSWR) at Harvard Divinity School (HDS) began. Since then, it "has been at the forefront of promoting the sympathetic study and understanding of world religions. It has supported academic inquiry and international understanding in this field through its residential community", and "its research efforts and funding, and its public programs and publications".

In 1960, Juliet Hollister (1916–2000) created the Temple of Understanding (TOU) to provide "interfaith education" with the purpose of "breaking down prejudicial boundaries". The Temple of Understanding "over several years hosted meetings that paved the way for the North American Interfaith Network (NAIN)".

In the late 1960s, interfaith groups such as the Clergy And Laity Concerned (CALC) joined around Civil Rights issues for African Americans and later were often vocal in their opposition to the Vietnam War.

In 1965, "about 100 Protestant, Catholic, and Jewish clergy" formed Clergy Concerned about Vietnam (CCAV). Its purpose was "to challenge U.S. policy on Vietnam". When the group admitted laity, it renamed itself National Emergency Committee of Clergy and Laymen Concerned about Vietnam (CALCAV) In 1967, Martin Luther King Jr. used its platform for his "Beyond Vietnam" speech. Later, CALCAV addressed other issues of social justice issues and changed its name to become simply Clergy and Laymen Concerned (CALC).

In 1965, during Vatican II, it was decided that relations with all religions should be developed. To do this, Pope Paul VI established a special secretariat (later a pontifical council) for relationships with non-Christians. The papal encyclical Ecclesiam Suam emphasized the importance of positive encounter between Christians and people of other faith traditions. The Declaration on the Relationship of the Church to Non-Christian Religions (Nostra Aetate) of 1965, spelled out the pastoral dimensions of this relationship.

In 1967, the World Council of Churches conference "proved to be a landmark both as the beginning of serious interest in interfaith dialogue as such in the WCC, and as the first involvement in the ecumenical discussion of the Vatican Secretariat for Non-Christians".

In 1970, the first World Conference of Religions for Peace was held in Kyoto, Japan. Religions for Peace is "the world's largest and most representative multi-religious coalition advancing common action for peace". Its work includes "dialogue" that "bears fruit in common concrete action". Through the organization, diverse religious communities discern "deeply held and widely shared" moral concerns, such as, "transforming violent conflict, promoting just and harmonious societies, advancing human development and protecting the earth".

In 1977, the Dialogue Interreligieux Monastique - Monastic Interreligious Dialogue (DIMMID) is created in Peterborough, Massachusetts and Loppem, Belgium. The aim of this Benedictine and Cistercian organisation is to foster religious dialogue with other monastic communities across all religions.

In 1978, the Interfaith Conference of Metropolitan Washington (IFC) was formed. "The IFC brings together eleven historic faith communities to promote dialogue, understanding and a sense of community and to work cooperatively for justice throughout the District of Columbia region." Members include the Baháʼí Faith, Buddhist, Hindu, Islamic, Jain, Jewish, Latter-day Saints, Protestant, Roman Catholic, Sikh and Zoroastrian faith communities.

In 1981, Minhaj-ul-Quran was founded. It is "a Pakistan-based international organization working to promote peace, tolerance, interfaith harmony and education, tackle extremism and terrorism, engage with young Muslims for religious moderation, promote women's rights, development and empowerment, and provide social welfare and promotion of human rights".

On October 27, 1986 Pope John Paul II had a day of prayer at Assisi and invited "about fifty Christians and fifty leaders of other faiths". In his book One Christ–Many Religions, S. J. Samartha says that the importance of that day of prayer for "interreligious relationships cannot be overestimated" and gives "several reasons" for its importance:

1. "It conferred legitimacy to Christian initiatives in interreligious dialogues."
2. "It was seen as an event of theological significance."
3. "Assisi was recognized as an act of dialogue in the highest degree."
4. "It emphasized the religious nature of peace."

However, Samartha added, two points caused "disquiet" to people of faiths other than Christian:

1. The Pope's insistence on Christ as the only source of peace.
2. For the prayers Christians were taken to one place and people of other faiths to another place.

Besides, the disquiet caused by the Pope's day of prayer, there is an ongoing "suspicion" by "neighbors of other faiths" that "dialogues may be used for purposes of Christian mission".

In 1991, Harvard University's Diana L. Eck launched the Pluralism Project by teaching a course on "World Religions in New England", in which students explored the "diverse religious communities in the Boston area". This project was expanded to charting "the development of interfaith efforts throughout the United States" and then the world. The Pluralism Project posts the information on the Pluralism Project website.

In 1993, on the centennial of its first conference, the Council for a Parliament of the World's Religions hosted a conference in Chicago with 8,000 participants from faith backgrounds around the world. "The Parliament is the oldest, the largest, and the most inclusive gathering of people of all faith and traditions." The organization hosts meetings around the world every few years. Its 2015 conference decided to hold meetings every two years.

In 1994, the Interfaith Alliance was created "to celebrate religious freedom and to challenge the bigotry and hatred arising from religious and political extremism infiltrating American politics". As of 2016, the Interfaith Alliance has 185,000 members across the country made up of 75 faith traditions as well as those of no faith tradition. The Interfaith Alliance works to (1) "respect the inherent rights of all individuals–as well as their differences", (2) "promote policies that protect vital boundaries between religion and government", and (3) "unite diverse voices to challenge extremism and build common ground".

In 1995, the Interfaith Center at the Presidio was founded with "a multi-faith Board". The center is a San Francisco Bay Area "interfaith friendship-building" that welcomes "people of all faiths". The center is committed to "healing and peacemaking within, between, and among religious and spiritual traditions".

In 1996, the Center for Interfaith Relations in Louisville, Kentucky, established the Festival of Faiths, a multi-day event that promotes interfaith understanding, cooperation and action.

In 1996, Kim Bobo founded the Interfaith Worker Justice (IWJ) organization. Today IWJ includes a national network of more than 70 local interfaith groups, worker centers and student groups, making it the leading national organization working to strengthen the religious community's involvement in issues of workplace justice.

In 1997, the Interfaith Center of New York (ICNY) was founded by the Very Rev. James Parks Morton, former Dean of the Cathedral of St. John the Divine. ICNY's historic partners have included the New York State Unified Court System, Catholic Charities of the Archdiocese of New York, UJA-Federation of New York, the Center for Court Innovation, the Harlem Community Justice Center, CONNECT and the city's nine Social Work Schools. ICNY works with hundreds of grassroots and immigrant religious leaders from fifteen different faith and ethnic traditions. Its "long-term goal is to help New York City become a nationally and internationally recognized model for mutual understanding and cooperation among faith traditions".

In 1998, the Muslim Christian Dialogue Forum was formed "to promote religious tolerance between Muslims and Christians so that they could work for the promotion of peace, human rights, and democracy". On December 8, 2015, the Forum sponsored a seminar on the subject of "Peace on Earth" at the Forman Christian College. The purpose was to bring the Muslim and Christian communities together to defeat "terrorism and extremism".

In 1998 the Forum on Religion and Ecology was founded at a conference at the United Nations. The Forum arose from 10 conferences at the Harvard Center for the Study of World Religions on World Religions and Ecology from 1996 to 1998. The Forum has continued the interreligious dialogue of the role of religions in retrieving, reevaluating, and reconstructing their traditions to meet the growing environmental and social challenges of our time. Through conferences, publications, and educational materials the Forum promotes cooperation in and among the world's religions for a flourishing Earth community. Its website includes sections on all world's religions, highlight engaged grassroots project and ecojustice work.

In 1998, Interfaith Power & Light (IPL) began as a project of the Episcopal Church's Grace Cathedral, San Francisco, California. Building on its initial success, the IPL model has "been adopted by 40 state affiliates", and IPL is "working to establish Interfaith Power & Light programs in every state". Ecological sustainability is central to IPL's "faith-based activism". The organization's work is reported in its Fact Sheet and 1915 Annual Report.

In 1999, The Rumi Forum (RF) was founded by the Turkish Hizmet [Service to Humanity] Movement. RF's mission is "to foster intercultural dialogue, stimulate thinking and exchange of opinions on supporting and fostering democracy and peace and to provide a common platform for education and information exchange". In particular, the Forum is interested in "pluralism, peace building and conflict resolution, intercultural and interfaith dialogue, social harmony and justice, civil rights and community cohesion".

== 21st-century initiatives ==
In 2000, the United Religions Initiative (URI) was founded "to promote enduring, daily interfaith cooperation, to end religiously motivated violence and to create cultures of peace, justice and healing for the Earth and all living beings". It now claims "more than 790 member groups and organizations, called Cooperation Circles, to engage in community action such as conflict resolution and reconciliation, environmental sustainability, education, women's and youth programs, and advocacy for human rights".

In 2001, after the September 11 attacks, "interfaith relations proliferated". "Conversations about the urgency of interfaith dialogue and the need to be knowledgeable about the faith of others gained traction in new ways."

In 2001, the Children of Abraham Institute ("CHAI") was founded "to articulate the 'hermeneutics of peace' ... that might be applied to bringing Jewish, Muslim, and Christian religious, social, and political leaders into shared study not only of the texts of Scripture but also of the paths and actions of peace that those texts demand".

In 2001, the Interfaith Encounter Association (IEA) was established in Israel. Its impetus dates from the late 1950s in Israel when a group of visionaries (which included Martin Buber) recognised the need for interfaith dialogue. IEA is dedicated to promoting "coexistence in the Middle East through cross-cultural study and inter-religious dialogue". It forms and maintains "on-going interfaith encounter groups, or centers, that bring together neighboring communities across the country. Each center is led by an interfaith coordinating team with one person for each community in the area."

In 2002 the Messiah Foundation International was formed as "an interfaith, non-religious, spiritual organisation". The organisation comprises "people belonging to various religions and faiths" who "strive to bring about widespread divine love and global peace".

In 2002, the World Council of Religious Leaders (WCRL) was launched in Bangkok. It is "an independent body" that brings religious resources to support the work of the United Nations and its agencies around the world, nation states and other international organizations, in the "quest for peace". It offers "the collective wisdom and resources of the faith traditions toward the resolution of critical global problems". The WCRL is not a part of the United Nations.

In 2002, Eboo Patel, a Muslim, started the Interfaith Youth Core (IFYC) with a Jewish friend and an evangelical Christian staff worker. The IFYC was started to bring students of different religions "together not just to talk, but to work together to feed the hungry, tutor children or build housing". The IFYC builds religious pluralism by "respect for people's diverse religious and non-religious identities" and "common action for the common good".

In 2003, the Jordanian Interfaith Coexistence Research Center (JICRC) was founded by The Very Reverend Father Nabil Haddad. It "focuses on grassroots interfaith dialogue and coexistence". JICRC provides "advice to government and non-government organizations and individual decision makers regarding questions of inter-religious understanding" and "participates in interfaith efforts on the local, regional, and international levels".

In 2006, the Coexist Foundation was established. Its mission is "to advance social cohesion through education and innovation" and "to strengthen the bond that holds a society together through a sustainable model of people working and learning together" in order to reduce "prejudice, hate and violence".

In 2007, the Greater Kansas City Festival of Faiths put on its first festival. The festival's goals include: increased participation in interfaith experience and fostering dialogue. Festivals include dramatic events and speakers to "expand interaction and appreciation for different worldviews and religious traditions" One-third of the attendees are 'first-timers' to any interfaith activity.

On October 13, 2007, Muslims expanded their message. In A Common Word Between Us and You, 138 Muslim scholars, clerics and intellectuals unanimously came together for the first time since the days of the Prophet[s] to declare the common ground between Christianity and Islam.

In 2007, the biennial interfaith Insight Film Festival began. It encourages "filmmakers throughout the world to make films about 'faith'". The Festival invites "participants from all faith backgrounds" as a way contributing "to understanding, respect and community cohesion".

In 2008, Rabbi Shlomo Riskin established the Center for Jewish-Christian Understanding and Cooperation (CJCUC). The center was founded to "begin a theological dialogue" between Jews and Christians with the belief that in dialogue the two faiths will "find far more which unites" them than divides them. The center, currently located at the Bible Lands Museum in Jerusalem, engages in Hebraic Bible Study for Christians, from both the local community and from abroad, has organized numerous interfaith praise initiatives, such as Day to Praise, and has established many fund-raising initiatives such as Blessing Bethlehem which aim to aid the persecuted Christian community of Bethlehem, in part, and the larger persecuted Christian community of the Middle East region and throughout the world.

In 2008, through the collaboration of the Hebrew Union College, Omar Ibn Al-Khattab Foundation, and the University of Southern California, the Center for Muslim-Jewish Engagement was created. The center was "inspired by USC President Steven B. Sample's vision of increasing collaboration between neighboring institutions in order to benefit both the university and the surrounding community". Its mission is "to promote dialogue, understanding and grassroots, congregational and academic partnerships among the oldest and the newest of the Abrahamic faiths while generating a contemporary understanding in this understudied area and creating new tools for interfaith communities locally, nationally and beyond."

In July 2008, a historic interfaith dialogue conference was initiated by King Abdullah of Saudi Arabia to solve world problems through concord instead of conflict. The conference was attended by religious leaders of different faiths such as Christianity, Judaism, Buddhism, Hinduism, and Taoism and was hosted by King Juan Carlos of Spain in Madrid.

In January 2009, at Gujarat's Mahuva, the Dalai Lama inaugurated an interfaith "World Religions-Dialogue and Symphony" conference convened by Hindu preacher Morari Bapu from January 6 to 11, 2009. This conference explored ways and means to deal with the discord among major religions, according to Morari Bapu. Participants included Prof. Samdhong Rinpoche on Buddhism, Diwan Saiyad Zainul Abedin Ali Sahib (Ajmer Sharif) on Islam, Dr. Prabalkant Dutt on non-Catholic Christianity, Swami Jayendra Saraswathi on Hinduism and Dastur Dr. Peshtan Hormazadiar Mirza on Zoroastrianism.

In 2009, the Vancouver School of Theology opened the Iona Pacific Inter-religious Centre. The Centre "models dialogical, constructive, and innovative research, learning and social engagement". The centre operates under the leadership of Principal and Dean, Dr. Wendy Fletcher, and Director, Rabbi Dr. Robert Daum.

In 2009, the Charter for Compassion was unveiled to the world. The Charter was inspired by Karen Armstrong when she received the 2008 TED Prize. She made a wish that the TED community would "help create, launch, and propagate a Charter for Compassion". After the contribution of thousands of people the Charter was compiled and presented. Charter for Compassion International serves as "an umbrella for people to engage in collaborative partnerships worldwide" by "concrete, practical actions".

In 2009, Council of Interfaith Communities (CIC) was incorporated in Washington, D.C. Its mission was "to be the administrative and ecclesiastical home for independent interfaith/multifaith churches, congregations and seminaries in the USA" and to honor "Interfaith as a spiritual expression". The CIC is one component of the World Council of Interfaith Communities.

In 2009, Project Aladdin, an initiative of cultural diplomacy and interreligious dialogue, was founded in Paris. It was initiated by the Fondation pour la Mémoire de la Shoah and sponsored by former French president Jacques Chirac and Prince Hassan bin Talal of Jordan. Its initial purpose was to counter Holocaust denial in the Muslim world by translating and publishing important Shoah scholarship in Arabic. It has since expanded its mission to combat intolerance, racism, and hate speech against minorities in general.

In 2010, Interfaith Partners of South Carolina was formed. It was the first South Carolina statewide diversity interfaith organization.

In 2010, Project Interfaith began its work. 35 volunteers began recording interviews with people in Omaha, Nebraska. Working in pairs, the volunteers were paired up and given a Flip Video camera to record the interviews. The interviewees were asked three questions: (1) "How do you identify yourself spiritually and why?", (2) "What is a stereotype that impacts you based on your religious and spiritual identity?", and (3) "How welcoming do you find our community for your religious or spiritual path?" The recorded interviews were posted on social media sites, like Facebook, Twitter, Flickr, and YouTube. Project Interfaith terminated in 2015.

In 2010, the Interfaith Center for Sustainable Development (ICSD) was established. ICSD is the largest interfaith environmental organization in the Middle East. Its work is bringing together "faith groups, religious leaders, and teachers to promote peace and sustainability".

In 2011, President Obama issued the Interfaith and Community Service Campus Challenge by sending a letter to all presidents of institutions of higher education in the United States. The goals of the Challenge included maximizing "the education contributions of community-based organizations, including faith and interfaith organizations". By 2015, more than 400 institutions of higher education had responded to the Challenge. In the 2015 Annual President's Interfaith and Community Service Campus Challenge Gathering, international participants were hosted for the first time.

In 2012, the King Abdullah bin Abdulaziz International Centre for Interreligious and Intercultural Dialogue (KAICIID) opened in Vienna, Austria. The board of directors included Jews, Christians, and Muslims. A rabbi on the board said that "the prime purpose is to empower the active work of those in the field, whether in the field of dialogue, of social activism or of conflict resolution". A Muslim member of the board said that "the aim is to promote acceptance of other cultures, moderation and tolerance". According to KAICIID officials, "the center is independent and would not be promoting any one religion".

In 2013, Rabbi Marc Schneier and Imam Shamsi Ali coauthored a book Sons of Abraham: A Candid Conversation about the Issues That Divide and Unite Jews and Muslims. Schneier and Ali write about the importance of civil interfaith discussions. Based on their experience, Schneier and Ali believe that other "Jews and Muslims can realize that they are actually more united than divided in their core beliefs".

In February 2016, the International Partnership on Religion and Sustainable Development (PaRD) was launched at the 'Partners for Change' conference in Berlin. The network connects government bodies, faith-based organisations and civil-society agencies from around the world to encourage communication on religion and sustainable development.

In 2016, the National Catholic Muslim Dialogue (NCMD) was established in the United States. This is a joint venture between the United States Conference of Catholic Bishops (USCCB), the Islamic Society of North America, the Islamic Circle of North America, Islamic Shura Council of Southern California, and the Islamic Educational Center of Orange County. The NCMD was an outgrowth of longstanding regional dialogues in the United States co-sponsored by the USCCB and their regional partners.

In February 2017, Sister Lucy Kurien, founder of Maher NGO, founded the Interfaith Association for Service to Humanity and Nature in Pune, India. She defines interfaith spirituality as, "We respect and love all religions. We never put down anyone's religion, or uphold one religion to the exclusion of others. What we want is to believe and respect interfaith religion, inclusive of all faith traditions. In our community spiritual practices, we invoke our prayers to the Divine, rather than invoking any particular name or form of God to the exclusion of others." As of October 2017, this new community has 198 members from 8 countries.

In 2022, Jewish theologian David Nekrutman founded The Isaiah Projects, a ministry and charity organization dedicated to creating educational tools in order to help Christians discover the Hebraic roots of their faith as well as providing food packages and humanitarian aid to individuals and families in need.

In 2023, The Abrahamic Family House of Worship, an interfaith complex in Abu Dhabi, inspired by the Document on Human Fraternity signed by Pope Francis and Ahmed El-Tayeb in 2019, was completed. It consists of three separate structures: St. Francis Church, Imam Al-Tayeb Mosque, and Moses Ben Maimon Synagogue. The complex serves as a community for inter-religious dialogue and exchange, as well as a physical manifestation of the Document on Human Fraternity. The design was prepared by Adjaye Associates, headed by David Adjaye. The three houses of worship have been named after the Grand Imam of Al Azhar, St. Francis of Assisi, and Moses Ben Maimon. The purpose is to represent interfaith co-existence, preserve the unique character of the religions represented, and build bridges between human civilization and the Abrahamic messages.

The United States Institute of Peace published works on interfaith dialogue and peacebuilding including a Special Report on Evaluating Interfaith Dialogue.

== United Nations support ==
The United Nations Alliance of Civilizations is an initiative to prevent violence and support social cohesion by promoting intercultural and interfaith dialogue. The UNAOC was proposed by the President of the Spanish Government, José Luis Rodríguez Zapatero at the 59th General Assembly of the United Nations in 2005. It was co-sponsored by the Turkish Prime Minister Recep Tayyip Erdoğan.

In 2008, Anwarul Karim Chowdhury said: "Interfaith dialogue is absolutely essential, relevant, and necessary. ... If 2009 is to truly be the Year of Interfaith Cooperation, the U.N. urgently needs to appoint an interfaith representative at a senior level in the Secretariat."

The Republic of the Philippines will host a Special Non-Aligned Movement Ministerial Meeting on Interfaith Dialogue and Cooperation for Peace and Development from March 16 to 18 in Manila. During the meeting, to be attended by ministers of foreign affairs of the NAM member countries, a declaration in support of interfaith dialogue initiatives will be adopted. An accompanying event will involve civil society activities.

In 2010, HM King Abdullah II addressed the 65th UN General Assembly and proposed the idea for a 'World Interfaith Harmony Week' to further broaden his goals of faith-driven world harmony by extending his call beyond the Muslim and Christian community to include people of all beliefs, those with no set religious beliefs as well. A few weeks later, HRH Prince Ghazi bin Muhammad presented the proposal to the UN General Assembly, where it was adopted unanimously as a UN Observance Event. The first week of February, every year, has been declared a UN World Interfaith Harmony Week. The Royal Islamic Strategic Studies Centre released a document which summarises the key events leading up to the UN resolution as well as documenting some Letters of Support and Events held in honour of the week.

== Research on interfaith dialogue ==
In the emerging field of Interreligious studies, historians, sociologists, and other scholars have conducted research on interfaith dialogue activities, methods, and outcomes. Notably, in 2013, there were several academic initiatives, including the founding of the Interfaith and Interreligious Studies Group at the American Academy of Religion, Office of Religion and Global Affairs at the United States Department of State, and a call for an interfaith studies field was published by Eboo Patel, founder of Interfaith Youth Core, who subsequently helped the funding of academic programs at U.S. universities. Academic journals were started, including the Journal of Interreligious Studies and Interreligious Studies and Intercultural Theology.

=== Preconditions ===
In her 2008 book The Im-Possibility of Interreligious Dialogue, Catherine Cornille outlines her preconditions for "constructive and enriching dialogue between religions". In summary, they include "doctrinal humility, commitment to a particular religion, interconnection, empathy, and hospitality".

In 2016, President Obama made two speeches that outlined preconditions for meaningful interfaith dialogue: On February 3, 2016, he spoke at the Islamic Society of Baltimore and on February 4, 2016, at the National Prayer Breakfast. The eight principles of interfaith relations as outlined by Obama were as follows:

1. Relationship building requires visiting each other.
2. Relationship requires learning about the others' history.
3. Relationship requires an appreciation of the other.
  External videos
  - The President Speaks at the National Prayer Breakfast
4. Relationship requires telling the truth.
5. Relationships depend on living up to our core theological principles and values.
6. Relationships offer a clear-headed understanding of our enemies.
  External videos
  - The President Speaks at the Islamic Society of Baltimore
7. Relationships help us overcome fear.
8. Relationship requires solidarity
