= Interfaith =

Interfaith (also called "interreligion") may refer to various ways of relating between beliefs, creeds, ideologies, faiths, or religions:

- Interfaith conflict (disambiguation)
- Interfaith dialogue, also known as interfaith cooperation
- Interfaith greetings in Indonesia
- Interfaith marriage
- Interfaith officiants
- Interfaith studies, also known as interreligious studies
- Interfaith worship spaces
- Multiple religious belonging
- Religious syncretism

== See also ==
- List of interreligious organizations
