= List of interreligious organizations =

An interreligious organization or interfaith organization is an organization that encourages dialogue and cooperation between the world's different religions. In 1893, the Parliament of the Worlds Religions held, in conjunction with the World Colombian Exposition, a conference held in Chicago that is believed to be the first interfaith gathering of notable significance. In the century since, many local, national and international organizations have been founded.

== International organizations ==
- Oxford Interfaith Forum | Interfaith Academia
- Congress of Leaders of World and Traditional Religions, established 2002
- Elijah Interfaith Institute, established 1997
- European Council of Religious Leaders, established 2002
- Focolare Movement, established 1943
- GreenFaith, established 1992
- Higher Committee of Human Fraternity, established 2019
- Interfaith Center for Sustainable Development, established 2010
- International Academy for Multicultural Cooperation (IAMC), established 2021
- International Association for Religious Freedom (IARF), established 1900
- International Council of Christians and Jews (ICCJ), established 1975
- International Dialogue Centre - KAICIID, established 2012
- Lutheran World Federation Program on Interfaith and Peace
- Parliament of the Worlds Religions, established 1893
- Pontifical Council for Interreligious Dialogue, established 1964
- Tanenbaum Center for Interreligious Understanding, established 1992
- Temple of Understanding (ToU), established 1960
- United Religions Initiative (URI), established 2000
- Religions for Peace, established 1970
- World Council of Churches Interreligious Dialogue and Cooperation, established 1948
- World Interfaith Harmony Week, established 2010

== National and regional organizations ==
- Australasian Police Multicultural Advisory Bureau
- American Jewish Committee (AJC) Dept of Interreligious Affairs, established 1906
- Berkley Center for Religion, Peace, and World Affairs at Georgetown University
- Center for Jewish-Christian Understanding and Cooperation (CJCUC), established 2008
- Interfaith Alliance, established 1994
- Interfaith America
- Interfaith Center on Corporate Responsibility
- Interfaith Center of New York
- Interfaith Drug Policy Initiative
- Interfaith Encounter Association
- Interfaith Families Project of Greater Washington, D.C., established in 1995
- Interfaith Housing Center of the Northern Suburbs
- Interfaith Partners of South Carolina (US), established 2010
- Malaysian Consultative Council of Buddhism, Christianity, Hinduism, Sikhism and Taoism, established 1983
- Muslim-Jewish Advisory Council, established 2016
- Network of Spiritual Progressives
- Peace Islands Institute
- The Pluralism Project, Harvard University

== See also ==
- Interfaith dialogue
