= Interreligious studies =

Academic field

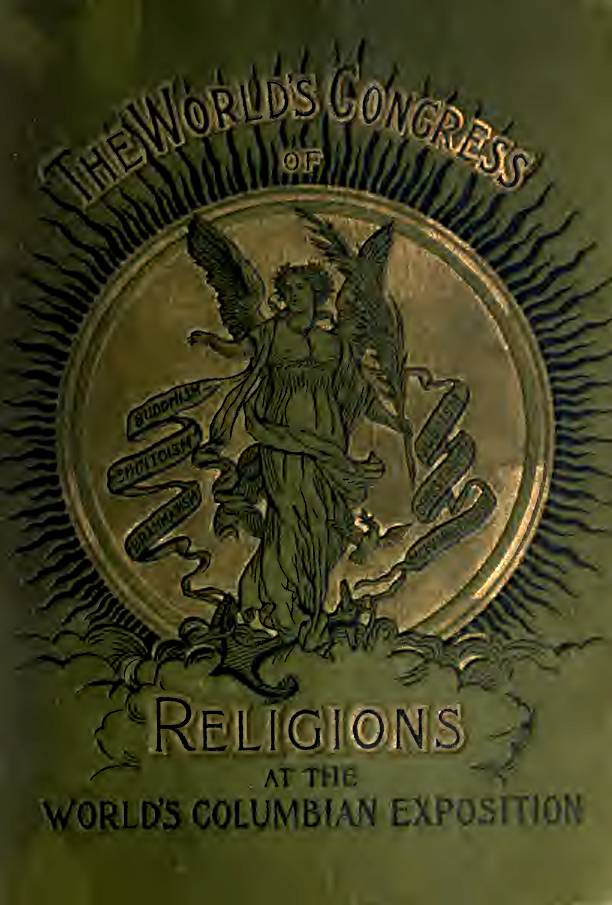
1893 'The World's Congress of Religions', that can be considered the first book in the field of interreligious studies.

Interreligious studies, also called interfaith studies, is the interdisciplinary academic field that researches and teaches about interfaith dialogue diplomacy international relations, and development cooperation without resorting to proselytism. It was developed as the sociological continuation of the efforts on the fields of theology, theopoetics, religious studies, atheology, civil religion, peace studies, and freedom of religion or belief (FoRB) law studies.

This academic discipline is relevant for its evidence-based scientific method for the rule of law social development of interfaith nonviolence peace culture, humanitarian aid, social services international non-governmental organizations, cultural diplomacy, and civil rights policymaking, multi-religious literacy, and interfaith education.

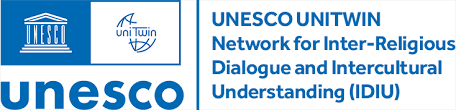
UNESCO UNITWIN Network for Inter-Religious Dialogue and Intercultural Understanding (IDIU) logo.

It was even recognized by the United Nations Education Science Culture Organization (UNESCO) through its foundation of the UNITWIN Network for Inter-Religious Dialogue and Intercultural Understanding (IDIU). The Institute for Global Engagement (IGE) has reiterated the value of the cathedra for international relations with the publishing of the Interfaith on the World Stage special edition of The Review of Faith & International Affairs.

== History ==
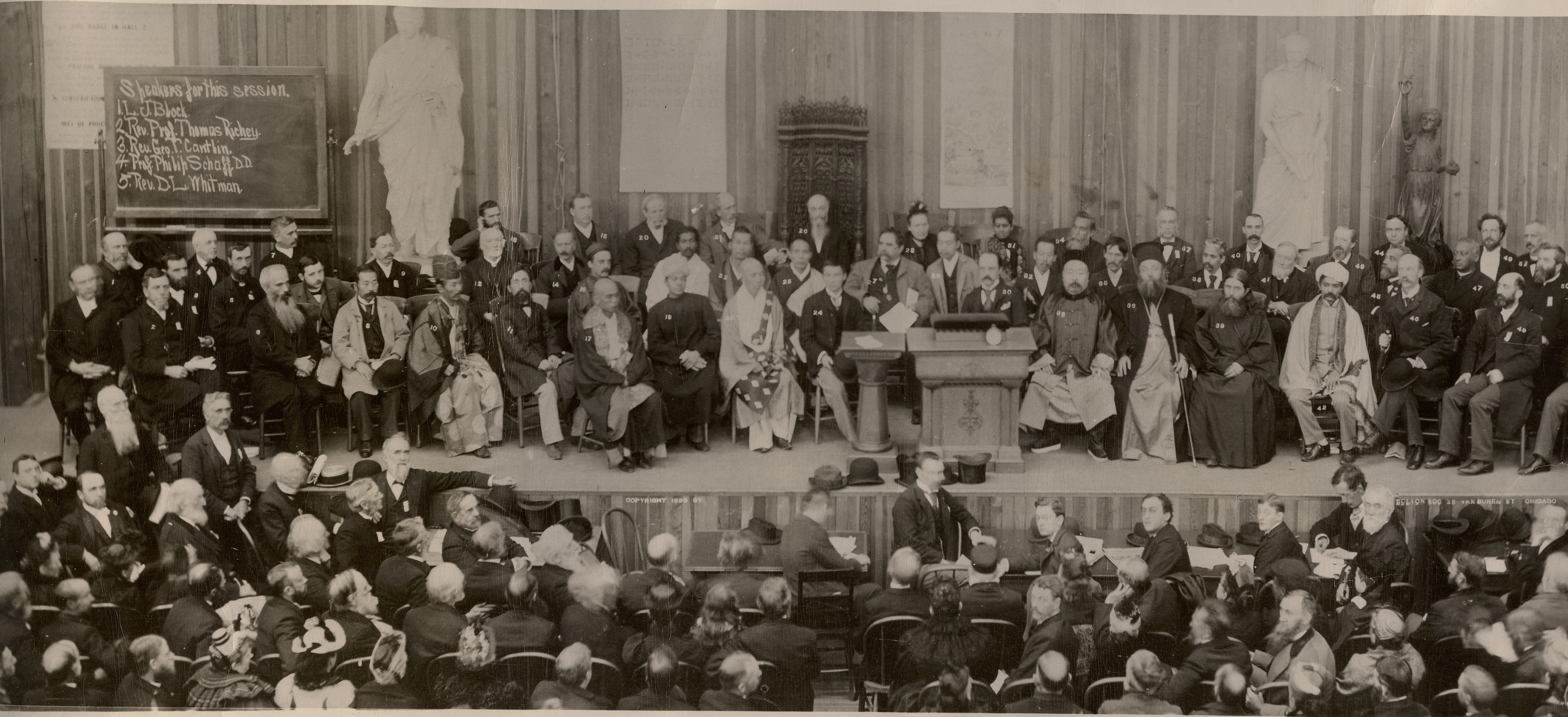
The Parliament of the World's Religions 'World's Congress of Religions' which is considered the first interreligious / interfaith conference.

In 1893 the Parliament of the World's Religions (PoWR) held the first World's Congress of Religion in the World's Columbian Exposition.

In 1900 the first International Congress for the History of Religions was held in Paris.

In 1903 the Religious Education Association (REA) was founded.

In 1964 the Holy See founded its Dicastery for Interreligious Dialogue with its Pontifical universities in Rome.

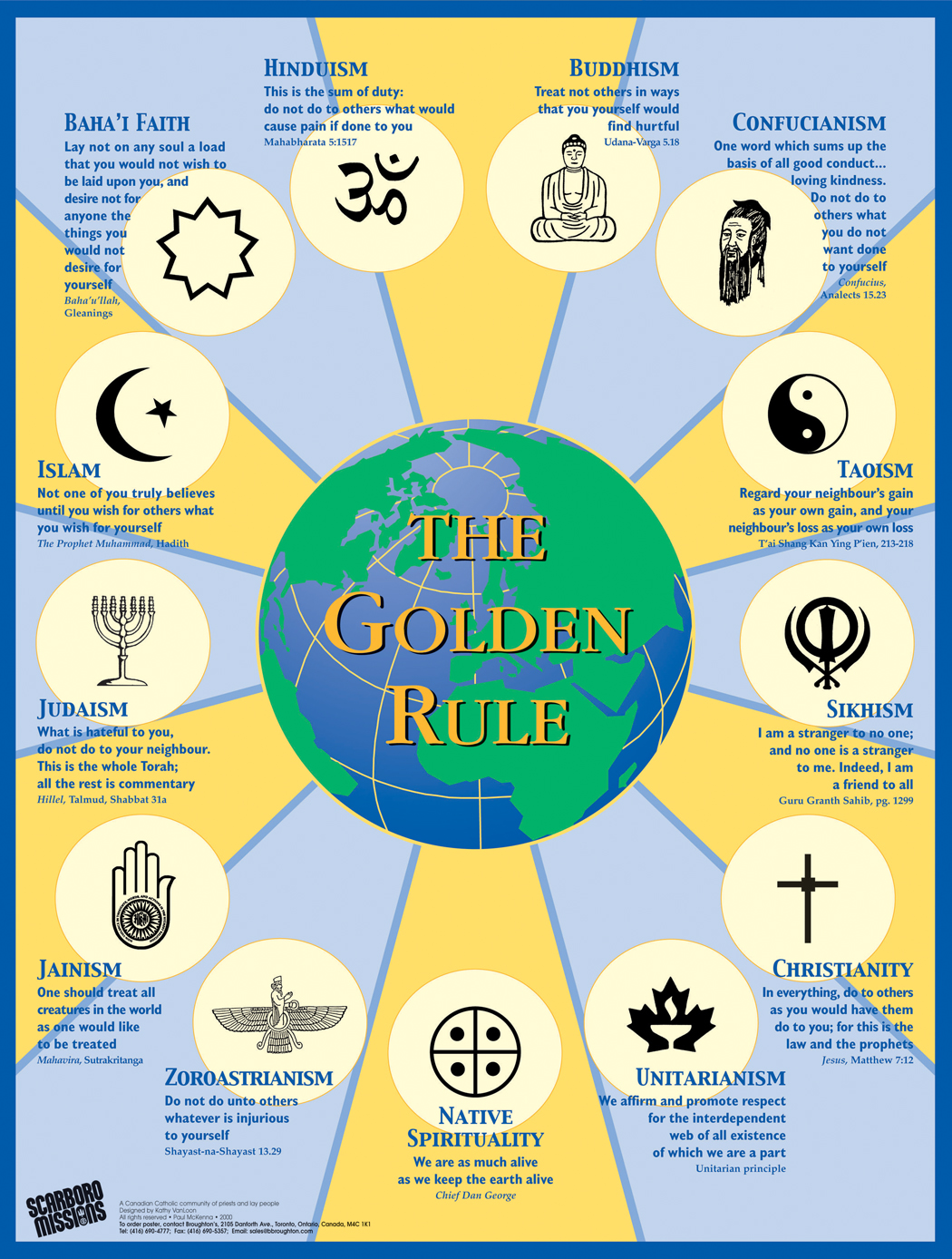
The Scarboro Missions seminal golden rule interfaith poster, one of the first interreligious studies educational resources.

In 1973 the Scarboro Missions was founded by the Catholic Church in Canada and developed the first series of interfaith policies and open educational resources (OER) which are still a standard in the area.

In 1990 the Arigatou international Global Network of Religions for Children (GNRC) was founded to research interreligious studies education possibilities for kids.

In 1996 Diana L. Eck co-founded the Pluralism Project at the Harvard University with Robert Wuthnow and Robert D. Putnam and the OneSpirit Interfaith Foundation started offering ordination-based training in interfaith ministry in the United Kingdom.

In 1997 the Association of Religion Data Archives (ARDA) was founded.

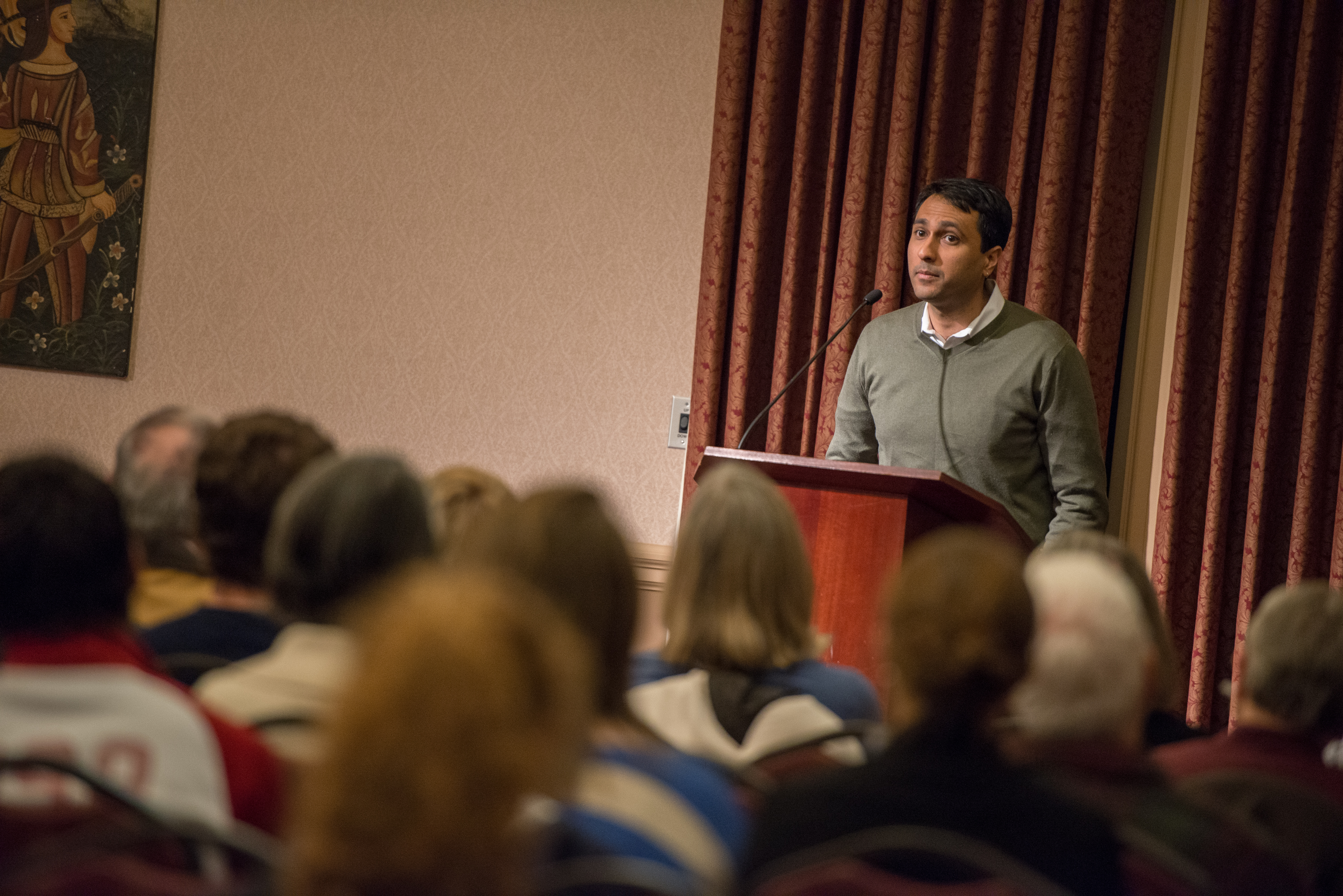
Eboo Patel, considered one of the founders of the field.

In 2002 Eboo Patel founded the Interfaith Youth Core (IYC) that developed multifaith space and chaplaincy groups in universities. He coined the name Interreligious / Interfaith Studies name for the area in the seminal book of the same name that founded the area officially.

In 2005 the European Society for Intercultural Theology and Interreligious Studies (ESITIS) was founded.

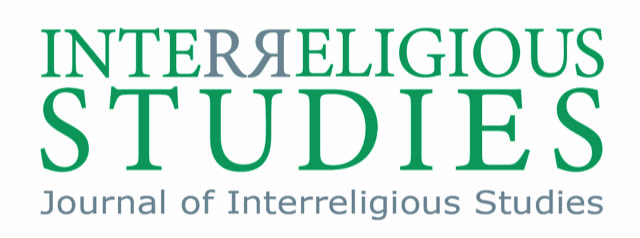
Logo of the Journal for Inter-Religious Studies (IJRS).

In 2009 the Journal for Inter-Religious Studies (IJRS) was founded.

In 2011 the Search for Common Ground developed the Universal Code of Conduct on Holy Sites and the Future for Religious Heritage (FRH) was also founded.

In 2012 the KAICIID Dialogue Centre founded the Joint Learning Initiative on Faith & Local Communities (JLIF&LC).

In 2013 the Interfaith and Interreligious Studies Group was founded at the American Academy of Religion (AAR) and the Office of Religion and Global Affairs at the United States Department of State.

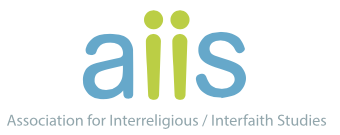
The logo of the Association of Interreligious / Interfaith Studies (AIIS).

In 2017 due to the international growth of interfaith academic programs Jennifer Howe Peace founded the Association for Interreligious / Interfaith Studies (AIIS) which convenes annual meetings. It was pivotal to allow the University of Wales first doctoral programme in the area.

In 2021 the Hartford Theological Seminary founded in 1883 became the Hartford International University for Religion and Peace.

In 2022 the Frankfurt–Tel Aviv Center for the Study of Religious and Interreligious Dynamics was launched by the Israeli Tel Aviv University and the German Goethe University Frankfurt.

In 2022 the Teachers College of the Columbia University founded the International Interfaith Laboratory (Interfaith Lab).

In 2023 Hannah J. Visser organized a seminal research on the field's bibliography.

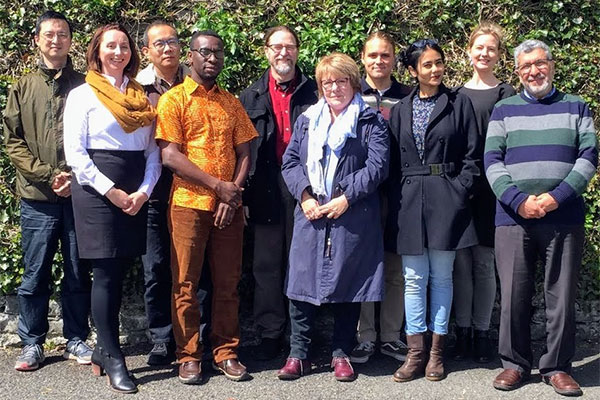
University of Wales Interfaith Research College Harmony Scholarship awardees.

== Definitions ==
"Interreligious Studies addresses the increasing societal and economic need for interreligious competence. Courses provide students with a comprehensive appreciation of issues which impact or inhibit the peaceful co-existence of varied religions, and equip students with an understanding of how interreligious understanding might be achieved." - Heidelberg University.

"Interfaith initiatives are seen as promising sites for societal change and personal transformation; however, many questions about the actual outcomes of such initiatives have remained unanswered." - University of Amsterdam School of Religion and Theology.

"Interreligious studies is a subdiscipline of religious studies that engages in the scholarly and religiously neutral description, multidisciplinary analysis, and theoretical framing of the interactions of religiously different people and groups, including the intersection of religion and secularity. It examines these interactions in historical and contemporary contexts, and in relation to other social systems and forces. Like other disciplines with applied dimensions, it serves the public good by bringing its analysis to bear on practical approaches to issues in religiously diverse societies." - Kate McCarthy.

"Interreligious studies is everything that religious studies cannot be, the analysis of relations the common values to religious traditions. What they have in common, not their identity traces." - United Religions Initiative (URI) director William E. Swing.

== Areas of Study ==
- International relations diplomacy and cultural diplomacy.
- Interfaith marriage.
- Interfaith workers justice.
- Interreligious organisations.
- Religious diplomacy.
- Religious law.
- Religious persecution and religious war peacemaking.
- Religious studies.
- Religious psychology.
- Religious humanism.
- Religious philosophies.
- Religious heritage, including sacred natural sites and religious art.
- Religious experience.
- Civil religion.
- Ireligion Studies.
- Anthropology of religion.
- Religious advocacy groups.
- Multifaith spaces.
- Religious education and religious literacy.
- Coloniality and Decoloniality studies.
- Chaplaincy.

== Controversies ==
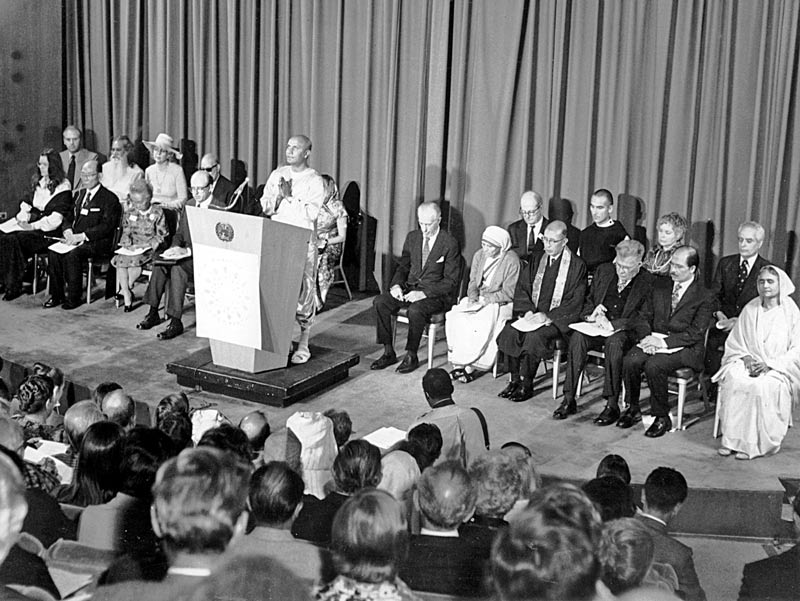
United Nations first interfaith studies conference.

It is said to be a one world religion plan of the new world order (NWO) world government deep state in some conspiracy theories.

It has been criticized for having insufficient neutrality skeptical detachment from religiosity.

It has been accused of being but a masked form of comparative theology and theology of religions by Alon Goshen-Gottstein.

It wrongfully appears in the Wikipedia list of unaccredited institutions of higher education that the Hartford International University for Religion and Peace is not accredited, but it is dually accredited by the Association of Theological Schools in the United States and Canada (ATS) and the New England Commission of Higher Education (NECHE).

It has dubiously accredited educational institutions like the Global Interfaith University (GIU) and Interfaith University (IU) that still need assistance in their regulamentation.
