= Jennifer Howe Peace =

South African-born American educator and scholar (born 1967)

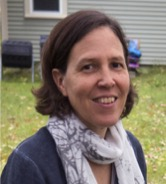
- Born: 1967 (age 58–59); South Africa
- Citizenship: United States of America
- Education: Ph.D., Graduate Theological Union, Berkeley, CA., 2005 M.A.T.S, Gordon-Conwell Theological Seminary, Hamilton, MA, 1995 B.A., Connecticut College, New London, CT, 1989
- Occupations: Interfaith educator and scholar of religion
- Known for: coformation
- Father: Richard Peace

Jennifer Howe Peace is an interfaith educator and religious scholar. She coined the term "coformation" in the training of religious leaders of different faiths. She also co-founded the Association of Interreligious/Interfaith Studies, a scholarly society that has fostered the growth of interfaith studies as field of research.

== Early life and education ==
Jennifer Howe Peace was born in 1967 in South Africa. Her parents, Richard and Judy Peace, were missionaries from the United States. Her parents founded African Enterprise, Inc., an interdenominational missions organization. Following their time in missions, her father took positions in teaching at Gordon-Conwwell Theological Seminary, and Fuller Theological Seminary. Peace reports that her parents' devotion to equity and their efforts to resist apartheid in South Africa contributed to her own interests in understanding justice in Christian and interfaith contexts. While seeking to practice what John Stott called "Basic Christianity", Peace, citing John Makransky, expressed a desire to liberate the faith from its own narratives.

Peace attended Connecticut College. Although skeptical and initially not identifying as a Christian, Peace experienced a conversion event while attending a charismatic revival in London where she was studying South Asian religion. In 1995, Peace completed a master's in theology from Gordon-Conwell Theological Seminary, where she studied in classes that included some that were taught by her father. She then completed a doctorate at the Graduate Theological Union in 2005. Her dissertation compared religious chant in Benedictine and Hindu practice. Although finding some inspiration in the topic, Peace recalls that the comparison felt forced.

While at Graduate Theological Union, Peace became a board member of the United Religions Initiative. Her work with the Initiative led her to attend the 1999 Parliament of the World's Religions. Peace's participation in the Parliament that year focused on youth activism in interfaith relations. While at the Parliament, Peace was an advocate for the creation of the Interfaith Youth Core led by Eboo Patel. Patel recalls that Peace also served on the youth organization's leadership team.

== Career ==
Peace's career as an educator and scholar began at Andover Newton Theological School in 2007. She became a professor of interfaith studies in 2010 and was promoted to associate rank with tenure in 2015. While at Andover, Peace contributed to the development of The Center for Inter-Religious and Communal Leadership Education (CIRCLE). The organization explored approaches to shared pastoral training across among different faiths and involved collaboration with the nearby Hebrew College. In 2017 Andover Newton merged with Yale Divinity School. Following the merger, Peace "retired" and decided not to relocate to Connecticut. The CIRCLE curriculum relocated to The Miller Center at Hebrew College and Peace retained her local relationships in the Newton, Massachusetts area.

Peace's work with CIRCLE led her to promote the concept of "coformation" (a term that she coined in the context of shared pastoral training). In Peace's view, interfaith, coformation "is a way of being Christian" in that it centers how Christians treat "religious neighbors".

In 2013, Peace co-founded the Interfaith and Interreligious Studies Unit of the American Academy of Religion (AAR) with Homayra Ziad. The organization has grown and has fostered the development of Interreligious Studies as a field of research in the Academy. Following on the success of the AAR unit, Peace established the Association of Interreligious/Interfaith Studies in 2017 as the first scholarly society for the developing field. In naming the organization, Peace intended for the two-part title to make space for scholars, activists, and practitioners.

Peace's studies of interreligious relations has led her to assert that interfaith work raises consciousness and promotes respect, strengthens without threatening religious identity, and is a "practical imperative" for global problem-solving.

After the retiring from Andover Newton, Peace served as the interim University Chaplain and as a researcher at Tufts University. She has also invested her efforts in art as a ceramicist and as an advisor to the Pluralism Project. She continues to contribute to scholarly publications as an editor and as an author.

== Selected works ==
- Pilgrimage, Place, and Pluralism: Essays in Conversation with Diana Eck, 2023. ISBN 1-960-09044-5
- "Religious Self, Religious Other: Coformation as a Model for Interreligious Education." In Critical Perspectives on Interreligious Education. Syeed, N. & Hadsell, H., eds., Brill, 2020. p. 201-219.
- Interreligious/Interfaith Studies: Defining a New Field, 2018. ISBN 9-780-807-01997-9.
- "Spiritual Other/Spiritual Self: Models of Transformative Interfaith Work" (Surjit Singh Lecture, Graduate Theological Union, 2013).
- My Neighbor's Faith: Stories of Interreligious Encounter, Growth, and Transformation, 2012. ISBN 9-781-570-75958-1.
- "Co-Formation through Interreligious Learning." Colloquy, 2011.
