= IWJ =

IWJ may refer to:

- Interfaith Worker Justice
- IATA airport code for Iwami Airport.
- Former IATA airport code for Marine Corps Air Station Iwakuni
