= European Council of Religious Leaders =

Interreligious organization in Europe

- Abbreviation: ECRL
- Type: INGO
- Purpose: Peace through common action of different faiths
- Headquarters: Oslo, Norway
- Region served: Europe
- Official language: English
- Moderator: Reverend Dr Thomas Wipf
- Parent organization: Religions for Peace
- Staff: 3
- Website: http://ecrl.eu/

European Council of Religious Leaders (ECRL) is a European interreligious council for cooperation between senior leaders of religious traditions represented in Europe (Judaism, Christianity, Islam, Buddhism, Hinduism, Sikhism and Zoroastrianism)). The ECRL is one out of five regional interreligious councils within the global movement, Religions for Peace. The Council held its inaugural meeting in Oslo in 2002.

== Vision and work ==
Vision: The major religious communities in Europe cooperate effectively for peace and reconciliation, in Europe and beyond.

This vision grows out of the shared commitment of faith traditions to human dignity and the right to live in peace. On this basis religious leaders have committed themselves to work together in order to prevent conflict, promote peaceful coexistence and encourage their communities to do the same. European Council of Religious Leaders works on the basis of mutual respect and appreciation for religious diversity.

Based in the different religious traditions and Holy Books, the Council encourages a common moral responsibility for the prevention of conflict and the promotion of dialogue. Values that are deeply held and widely shared offer guidance to the work. In a continent where religion has often been seen as a source of conflict, the European Council of Religious Leaders seeks to be a resource for peace.

The ECRL aims at promoting inter-religious cooperation in Europe and beyond. The work of the Council includes annual council meetings, participation in conferences, delegation visits to conflict areas and maintaining contacts across religious boundaries.

The secretariat of the ECRL is situated in Oslo.

=== The European Council of Religious Leaders' Berlin Declaration on Interreligious Dialogue ===
As a guideline for the work of the Council and to spread knowledge of inter-religious dialogue, the ECRL, on its Council meeting in Berlin in 2008, issued a declaration:

Preamble

2008 has been declared the European Year of Intercultural Dialogue. In a pluralistic Europe dialogue across dividing lines - be they cultural, linguistic or religious - is of the greatest importance. All over Europe issues related to identity are hotly debated, and often religion is at the centre of discussions. Europe and Europeans are also constantly interacting with the rest of the world, experiencing the joys and the challenges of communicating across cultural and religious divides.

Sometimes religion is seen as an obstacle to peaceful coexistence and social cohesion. At the same time we know that some of the most pressing challenges in our time - climate change, poverty, migration, marginalisation of women, discrimination and terrorism - can only be solved if we unite resources across traditional dividing lines.

3 to 5 March 2008 the European Council of Religious Leaders - Religions for Peace met in Berlin, a city which symbolises a history of division in Europe as well as reconciliation and new beginnings. As religious leaders we support initiatives to further dialogue in this continent. In order to promote bold, responsible and well-informed interreligious dialogue on all levels of European society, we hereby offer the Berlin Declaration on Interreligious Dialogue:

(1) Religion permeates Europe: Christianity, Islam and Judaism are part of European history. Today other great religious traditions have also found a place in the continent. In every town or village in Europe there is at least one house of worship: a Church, a Mosque or a Synagogue. To ensure a prosperous and harmonious future for Europe, people of different faiths must live peacefully together.

(2) Interreligious dialogue emphasises both our similarities and our differences: In interreligious dialogue we acknowledge that human beings of all faiths share certain experiences, needs and longings. We also acknowledge that we are different from each other in many respects and will remain different. Our religious traditions have formed different social rules and models which sometimes contradict each other. One aim of interreligious dialogue is to reduce false perceptions of difference and culture gaps, while we respect that something about our dialogue partner will necessarily remain other (or even alien) to us.

(3) Interreligious dialogue should promote respect for human rights: Interreligious dialogue should respect the shared values found within all great religious traditions and embodied within the Universal Declaration of Human Rights. Commitment to human rights does not preclude a variety of world views or ethical systems and interpretations.

(4) The invitation to the dialogue is open: The more we differ, the more we need dialogue. It is not a precondition for dialogue that we share a wide spectrum of values and ideas. Only clear breaches of respect for the most fundamental values, such as the right to life and the rule of law, should exclude people from being invited into dialogue. While the invitation is open, everyone must abide by the agreed rules of a particular dialoguing situation. Women and young people have important perspectives and contributions to offer and should have distinct voices in interreligious dialogue.

(5) Interreligious dialogue is a mode of relating to other faiths and has a transforming potential: Interreligious dialogue is a particular way of interacting with others through which all who are involved can be transformed. Dialogue on issues of faith and identity is not negotiations, because we do not seek agreement, it is not debates, because we do not seek to win over the other, and it is more than a discussion because we contribute not only rational arguments but personal and emotive stories and experiences and thus engage existentially with each other.

(6) Interreligious dialogue affirms the integrity of religious beliefs: In dialogue we come closer to each other without necessarily becoming more similar. All who engage in interreligious dialogue should do so with full integrity in their own religious tradition and without compromise to what they hold dear. In interreligious dialogue we do not aim at creating a new or shared religion.

(7) Interreligious dialogue addresses asymmetric power relationships with honesty: The power relationship between different religious groups is sometimes asymmetric. This can be caused by for example poverty/wealth, language, gender or numbers (minority/majority). Interreligious dialogue must not be used to obscure this. In dialogue the facts and experiences of asymmetric power should be addressed, and mechanisms should be found to give voice to those who struggle to be heard.

(8) Interreligious dialogue furthers stakeholdership and participation in society: Interreligious dialogue should address a wide spectrum of issues. It is important to explore shared values and address common concerns, but one should not shy away from addressing issues on which there are disagreement, uncertainty or even fear of the other. Some current trends, such as rapid development of new technology in biology, medicine and communication and changing understandings of family are closely linked to questions of values and identities. Religions do not agree on the responses to these questions, but should discuss these matters with openness and courage. Dialogue is not a means to a predefined end, but it is intrinsic to genuine dialogue that it furthers mutual understanding, respect for differences, and the participation and stakeholdership of all in society and thus strengthens social cohesion.

(9) Interreligious dialogue leads to common action: A full understanding of interreligious dialogue includes common action - diapraxis. The dignity of human life, to which all religions are committed, is challenged for example through poverty, violence, abuse of women and children, discrimination of migrants and dramatic changes in the natural environment. Different religions can address these issues together, although our ethics may draw on different resources. Interreligious dialogue should aim at mustering the resources of varying religious traditions to take up the challenges which Europe faces today. Through common action we learn to understand better ourselves, each other, and the world in which we live.

(10) Structures for interreligious cooperation are assets in times of crisis: Repeatedly religion plays a role in situations of conflict. Established and trustful structures for interreligious dialogue are a tremendous strength when relationships between communities deteriorate. Religious leaders must address dangerous and violent perversions of religion within their own communities.

(11) Knowledge and confidence in a tradition further interreligious understanding: Open and trustful interreligious dialogue is furthered by a secure knowledge of one’s own religious tradition as well as that of others. This knowledge should be taught in a spirit of peace and respect for the different traditions. Many religions make truth claims that are mutually exclusive. This is no more an impediment to dialogue and the full participation in society than the explicit or implicit truth claims of secular ideologies. Dialogue between religions, cultures and social groups is often dialogue across opposing truth claims and world views.

(12) Religion has a natural place also in the public sphere: Religion continues to have an important role to play in the public life of a Europe with many religions. This applies to minorities and majorities alike. The public display of religious symbols or celebration of religious festivals should neither be seen as offensive to other religions nor as a threat to social cohesion. Religious minorities in Europe generally do not feel offended by for example public Christmas or Easter celebrations in countries where this is a tradition as long as their own freedom of religion is respected.

(13) Religious leaders, religious people and the authorities share responsibility for interreligious dialogue: Convinced that interreligious dialogue is important for a peaceful and prosperous Europe we call on religious leaders of all religious traditions and in every corner of Europe to join in interreligious dialogue based on the principles outlined in this declaration. We call on all religious people in Europe to enter into the most important dialogue of all, “the dialogue of life”, in the local community, in families and workplaces with confidence and courage. We call on the authorities on local, national and European level to engage constructively with religious communities in mutual respect for each other’s different roles, and to create frameworks within which religious practices and interreligious dialogue based on the principles in this declaration may be further developed and prosper for the benefit of peaceful coexistence in Europe.

== Members ==
The council consists of senior religious leaders representing religions/denominations of longer history of presence in Europe, religious traditions with shorter presence in Europe and currently one ex officio member representing the Religions for Peace movement.

=== Moderator (President) ===
The Moderator position was renamed as ‘President’ in 2018

- 2002-2012: Gunnar Stålsett
- since 2012: Dr. Revd Thomas Wipf

=== Council members ===
==== Jewish ====
(2023)

- Rabbi Izhak Dayan, Switzerland
- Rabbi Schlomo Hofmeister, Austria
- Rabbi Awraham Soetendorp, Netherlands
- Rabbi Yeshaya Dalsace, France
- Gady Gronich, Germany
- Shorena Mikava, Germany

==== Muslim ====
(2023)

- Mufti Nedzad Grabus, Bosnia & Herzegovina
- Shaykh Ibrahim Mogra, Great Britain
- M.A. Özlem Nas, Germany
- Imam Yahya Pallavicini, Italy
- Shaykh Sayed Razawi, Scotland

==== Christian: Orthodox ====
(2023)

- Rev Dr Andreas Andreopoulos, Great Britain
- Fr Heikki Huttunen, Finland
- Bishop Ioannis of Thermopylae, Greece

==== Christian: Catholic ====
(2023)

- Mr. Etienna De Jonghe, Belgium
- Sister Madeleine Fredell, Sweden
- Bishop William Kenney, Great Britain
- Dr habil. Agata S. Nalborczyk, Poland

==== Christian: Protestant and Anglican ====
(2023)

- Bishop Martin Hein, Germany
- Bishop Atle Sommerfeldt, Norway
- Revd Dr. Thomas Wipf, Switzerland
- Bishop Elof Westergaard, Denmark
- Bishop Kaisamari Hintikka, Finland

==== Dharmic Religions ====
(2023)

- Mr. Jamie Cresswell, Buddhist, Great Britain
- Mr. Dorab Mistry OBE, Zoroastrian, Great Britain
- Bhai Sahib Dr. Mohinder Singh, Sikh, Great Britain
- Sivarama Swami, Hungary
- Dr. Lakshmi Vyas, Hindu, Great Britain
- Gandharvika Prema Devi Dasi, Hindu (ISKCON), Hungary

==== Ex officio members ====
- Dr. William F. Vendley, Religions for Peace - International, USA

=== Vice-Presidents ===
- Mr. Jamie Cresswell, Buddhist, Great Britain
- Chief Rabbi Izhak Dayan, Switzerland
- Metropolitan Emmanuel, France
- Mufti Nedzad Grabus, Slovenia
- Bishop William Kenney, Great Britain
- Revd Dr. Thomas Wipf, Switzerland

=== Advisers ===
(2023)

- Professor Andreas Herrmann
- Dr. Martin Affolderbach
- Dr Brinder Mahon
- Revd. Joachim Pothmann
- Stein Villumstadt

== See also ==
- Freedom of religion
- Interfaith dialogue
- Religious intolerance
- Toleration
