= Jennifer Peace =

Jennifer Peace may refer to:

- Jennifer Peace (military officer), American military officer
- Jennifer Howe Peace, American religious scholar
