= Banaras: City of Light =

- First edition
- Author: Diana L. Eck
- Subject: Varanasi
- Genre: Local history
- Publisher: Alfred A. Knopf
- Publication date: 1982
- Publication place: United States
- Pages: 427
- ISBN: 978-0231114479

Banaras: City of Light is a 1982 book on the local history of Varanasi by Diana L. Eck.

== Response ==
A scholarly review said that the book was an introduction to Varanasi, and Hindu religious tradition, and the general concept of sacred geography. One book reviewer said that the text was valuable for collecting and documenting a huge amount of information. That reviewer, who is Indian, also said that while non-Indians would not notice, there are some statements which stand out as inaccurate or conjectural to the Indian perspective. The Wilson Quarterly said that the book was a history of India targeted to Western readers who would need outsider descriptions of Indian culture. A reviewer for The Washington Post said that the author's aim in the book is to impress on the reader people in Banaras still respect stories from ancient times and associate them with places which they have venerated for ages. Kirkus Reviews said that the book was scholarly and information rich but could be overwhelming for someone who was only curious.

Upon the release of Eck's 2013 India—A Sacred Geography, a reviewer noted that in this later book Eck gives examples and generalizes about ideas that Eck shared in the earlier Banaras book.

A 2014 of scholarly essays, Banâras Revisited: Scholarly Pilgrimages to the City of Light, took its name from the Eck book. A reviewer for that book noted that "Eck’s study was a point of entry" for a generation of scholars on India and that many of the essays in this new book cite the Eck book in their bibliographies.
