= William F. Vendley =

Dr. William F. Vendley
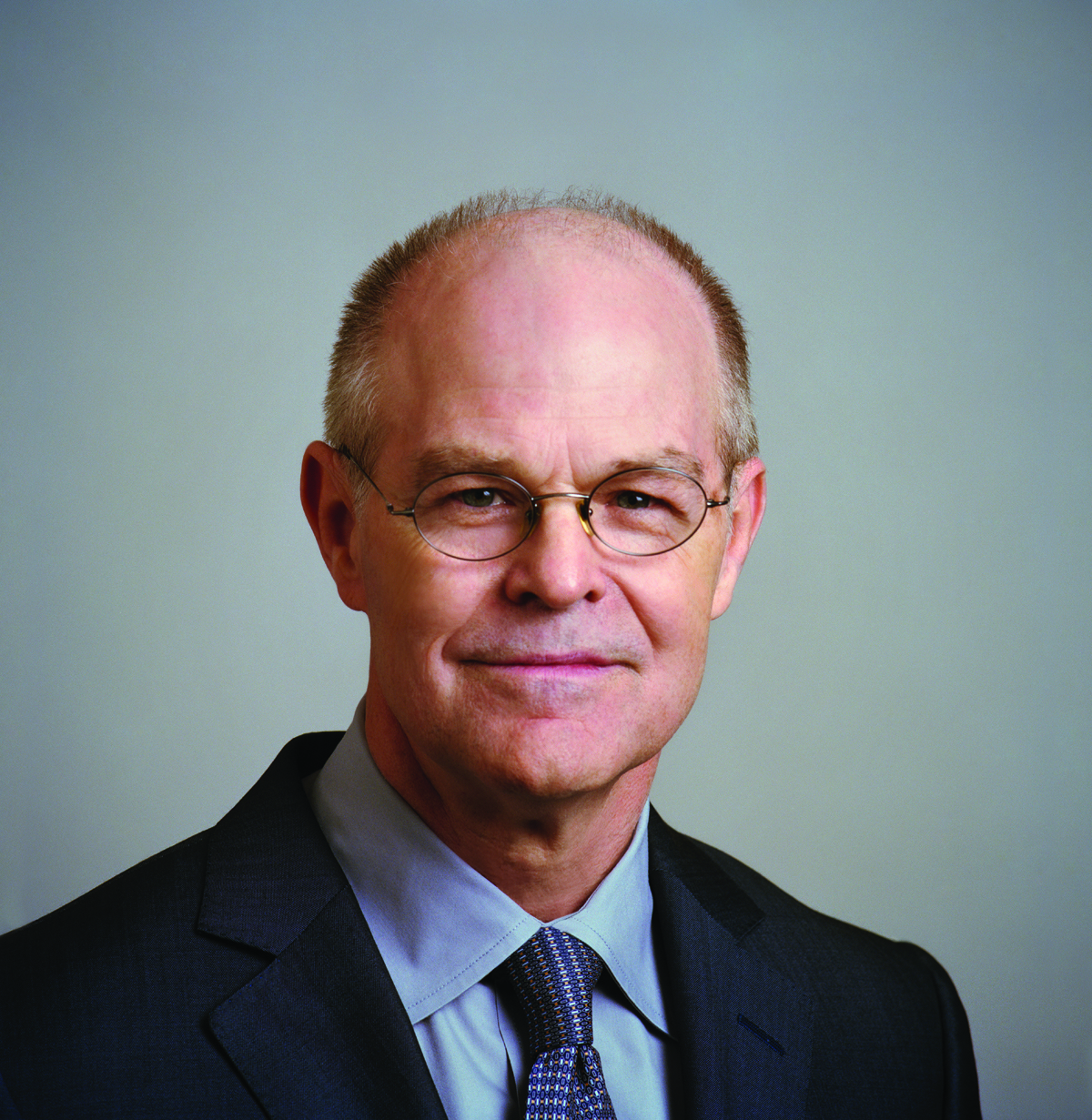

Secretary-General of the World Conference of Religions for Peace
- In office 1994–2019

Personal details
- Education: Purdue University B.A. Maryknoll School of Theology M.A. Fordham University Ph.D.

Dr. William Fray Vendley was the Secretary General of the World Conference of Religions for Peace (WCRP). He is a member of its World Council and coordinates the activities and projects of WCRP's Inter-religious Councils in 96 countries and in five regions, including the Africa, Asia Europe, Latin America, and the Middle East. He is a member of the Council on Foreign Relations.

Religions for Peace is the world's largest and most representative multi-religious coalition advancing common action among the religious communities to stop war, address poverty, and protect the earth.

Vendley assumed leadership of Religions for Peace International in 1994. He works in situations of armed conflict to mobilize and equip religious communities to build peace. In Ethiopia, Eritrea, Sierra Leone, Liberia, Indonesia, Sri Lanka, and Iraq and other countries, he has led multi-religious efforts to prevent conflicts, mediate peace among warring parties, and rebuild societies in the aftermath of violence.

Notable among Religions for Peace developments during Vendley's tenure is the Hope for African Children Initiative, which he co-founded with CARE, Save the Children, and Plan International to target the needs of African children orphaned by HIV/AIDS. The initiative resulted in over US$50 million being raised to equip African communities, particularly religious communities, as actors in the fight against AIDS, and included the creative engagement of grassroots congregations in the provision of needed services.

Vendley is a pioneer in employing religious cooperation to help resolve conflict. For example, he facilitated the establishment of the Religions for Peace Inter-religious Council of Bosnia-Herzegovina in the immediate aftermath of the civil war, which resulted in its setting forth an historic commitment of the religious communities to re-build a single, multi-ethnic Bosnia. He established the Religions for Peace Inter-religious Council of Sierra Leone and served as a consultant in the peace talks in Lome, Togo, that ended the violent conflict between the Sierra Leone government and rebels. He convened senior Iraqi religious leaders in Amman three weeks after the occupation of Iraq resulting in their commitment to develop an Inter-religious Council of Iraq and equipped them to cooperate in the provision of humanitarian assistance.

Vendley lectures frequently in academic, United Nations, and NGO fora. He has been awarded numerous prizes for religion and human rights, and serves on the boards of a number of organizations ranging from the fine arts to those committed to peace building. He is a member the Council on Foreign Relations Religious Committee, the Center for Interfaith Action on Global Poverty, an advisor to the Clinton Global Initiative Religion Forum, an advisor to UNICEF on global partnerships, and a member of the Saudi-based 2008 Madrid World Conference on Dialogue Committee.

Vendley is a theologian and has served as a professor and dean in graduate schools of theology. Born and raised in Indiana, he earned his BA from Purdue University (1971) and was the recipient of the Distinguished Alumni for Science award. He has a MA from Maryknoll School of Theology (1976) and a Ph.D. from Fordham University (1984).

Vendley is fluent in Japanese. He is married to Yasuko Vendley. They reside in New York.

At the 10th Religion for Peace world Assembly convened in Lindau, Germany, in August 2019, Vendley finished his term as secretary general. He was replaced by Dr. Azza Karam.
