= Universal Code of Conduct on Holy Sites =

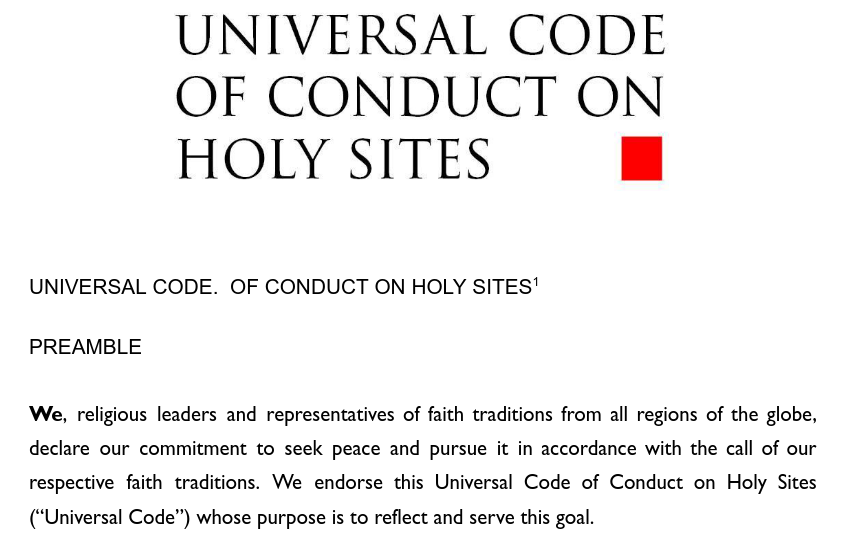
Preamble of the Universal Code of Conduct on Holy Sites charter.

The Universal Code of Conduct on Holy Sites is an open standard for religious heritage and sacred natural sites safeguard developed by the Search for Common Ground and the Oslo Center for Peace and Human Rights. Its authoritative status as an international law policy is stated by its dozens of international religious leaderships from various traditions endorsements along its acceptance by the United Nations.
