= Open Communities =

US nonprofit organization

Open Communities (formerly Interfaith Housing Center of the Northern Suburbs) is a nonprofit organization that advocates for fair and affordable housing in 17 northern suburbs of Chicago. Open Communities' mission is to create more inclusive communities by ensuring everyone has equal access to safe, stable housing. Open Communities works with current and prospective residents and local groups to promote economically and culturally diverse communities. Free services include fair and affordable housing counseling services, community education, advocacy, and organizing for welcoming communities.

== History ==
Open Communities has its roots in the civil rights movement of the 1960s. A group of young mothers in Wilmette were worried that their children were growing up in a community that lacked diversity, and they began to discuss how they could organize for change. There were no fair housing laws at that time, and housing discrimination was common. But although local housing ads often stipulated, "No Negroes, Orientals or Jews," the women, joined by local clergy, believed that many community members shared their concerns about housing discrimination.

In 1972, a fair housing conference organized by local clergy in 1972 resulted in the creation of the North Shore Interfaith Housing Council, which became the North Suburban Housing Center in 1977, then Interfaith Housing Center of the Northern Suburbs in 1986, and Open Communities in 2012.

== Service programs ==
=== Fair housing and discrimination complaints ===
Open Communities helps individuals who report illegal housing discrimination, predominantly the Civil Rights Act of 1968, which makes denying housing to anyone on the basis of their race, color, national origin illegal. Additionally, the law protects those with disabilities, as well as families with children. Open Communities is an operating member of the National Fair Housing Alliance.

In addition to pursuing individual cases, Open Communities works to settle cases for building that systemically discriminate against seniors or people with disabilities.

=== Landlord–tenant advice ===
Both landlords and tenants have rights and responsibilities toward one another, their neighbors and their homes. Landlords' and tenants' rights are protected under state and local laws, which establish requirements about security deposits, heating, property maintenance, entry, and eviction.

=== Housing counseling and foreclosure prevention ===
The foreclosure crisis is one of the nation's most pressing housing issues, and Illinois continues to have one of the highest rates of foreclosure fillings. The crisis has been particularly hard on immigrants, people of color, and lower-income families who became north suburban homeowners in the last two decades. More than 14,500 homes were foreclosed in Chicago's northern suburbs between 2005 and 2013, according to an Open Communities' analysis of Woodstock Institute foreclosure filings data.

== Advocacy and community organizing ==
Open Communities was founded on the belief that making housing available to people of all incomes and backgrounds makes the northern suburbs a better place to live. The organization collaborates with and builds local and regional coalitions to advance fair and affordable housing programs, policies and legislation, and provide support for bricks-and-mortar housing developments that meet a wide range of local needs. In 2016, Open Communities joined the #Fightfor15.

=== The Justice Project ===
"The Justice Project" launched in 2015 to commemorate Dr. King's visit to Winnetka in 1965 and challenge communities to become even more welcoming. "The Justice Project: The March Continues" is a grassroots social justice movement to inspire the communities in the northern suburbs of Chicago and beyond to be welcoming, inclusive and diverse, and to offer them a framework for doing so.

=== #StandWithMuslims ===
Dozens of community groups, led by Open Communities and Jewish Voice for Peace, stand against the many ways in which anti-Muslim and xenophobic hatred manifests itself, including hate speech and hate crimes; institutionalized racism and state-sanctioned violence; racial and religious profiling in all its forms; and prejudice that targets refugees and immigrants of all backgrounds.
