= Interfaith Families Project of Greater Washington, D.C. =

Interfaith congregation in the DC metropolitan area

Religion
- Affiliation: Interfaith
- Leadership: Jewish Spiritual Leader: Rabbi Debbie Reichmann; Christian Spiritual Leader: Rev. Samantha Gonzalez-Block; Administrative Director: Miranda Hovemeyer
- Status: Active

Location
- Location: Rockville, Maryland

Website
- iffp.org

The Interfaith Families Project of Greater Washington, D.C., (IFFP) is an interfaith congregation founded by four “founding moms” in 1995. It has grown from a Jewish and Christian Sunday School in a Takoma Park, Maryland home into a community of more than 120 families from Montgomery County, Maryland, Northern Virginia, Washington, D.C., Baltimore and Annapolis., now one of the largest interfaith programs in the country.

== History ==
IFFP was established in 1995 when four women in interfaith marriages discussed their desire to have more of a religious foundation for their children.

Initially, the four families gathered to celebrate the Jewish and Christian holidays. They later established an interfaith Sunday School. They started as a small group in a living room in Takoma Park, Maryland, but soon attracted enough families that they began renting rooms at a local church.

In 1998, they hired Rev. Julia Jarvis as a part-time administrator for the growing Sunday School. Rev. Jarvis oversaw the group's move to Sligo Middle School and initiated the development of a spiritual "gathering" for families on Sunday mornings, as well as a "Coming of Age" program for eighth graders approaching the traditional age for a Bar Mitzvah or Confirmation, and programs for adults, such as a Women's Retreat.

In 2001, Ellen Jennings was hired as Director of Religious Education and Rev. Jarvis' title was changed to Spiritual Director and Community Leader. In 2003, Rev. Heather Kirk-Davidoff joined IFFP as Spiritual Director and Community Leader and in 2004, Rabbi Harold White of Georgetown University joined IFFP as an additional Spiritual Advisor. In 2006, Rev. Julia Jarvis returned as Spiritual Director and Community Leader.

== Today ==
IFFP meets most Sundays during the school year at Saint Mark Presbyterian Church in Rockville, Maryland, providing dual-faith religious education for over 150 children through a Sunday School for pre-school through eighth grade, a "Coming of Age" program for 7th and 8th graders, and a teen group.

Adult education topics include discussion of issues that arise when celebrating Jewish and Christian holidays in an Interfaith home and Interfaith couples are invited to workshops exploring the challenges of Interfaith marriage.

Members teach Sunday School, participate in community service programs, and serve in other capacities to manage and guide the organization.

Today's members range from original members whose children are now in high school and college, to young couples with their first interfaith relationship questions.

The organization is currently led by Reverend Samantha Gonzalez Block, Reverend and Christian Spiritual Leader, and Rabbi Deborah Reichmann, Rabbi and Jewish Spiritual Leader.
