= Project Interfaith =

U.S. nonprofit organization

Project Interfaith, based in Omaha, Nebraska, is a nonprofit organization [501(c)(3)]. Founded in 2004 by Executive Director Beth Katz, Project Interfaith aims to create a sustainable interfaith program. Through donor support, Project Interfaith was formally launched in December 2005. Project Interfaith has since formally incorporated and received tax-exempt status. Project Interfaith started a multimedia video website, RavelUnravel on May 17, 2012, which explores spiritual and religious identities that make up the world. Project Interfaith closed its doors in February 2015.

== Mission ==
Project Interfaith grows understanding, respect and relationships among people of all faiths, beliefs and cultures in order to dispel tension and conflict arising from cultural and religious ignorance, stereotyping, and marginalization. The organization strives to fulfill its mission by creating spaces in communities and online where people can share their personal experiences and connect with others of diverse beliefs and cultures.

== Vision ==
Project Interfaith strives to create a community and world where people of all faiths, beliefs and cultures are valued, included and protected. Project Interfaith seeks to serve as a leader and resource on interfaith relations and religious & cultural diversity.

== RavelUnravel ==
RavelUnravel is a multimedia exploration of the tapestry of spiritual and religious identities that make up our communities and world, with over 930 video interviews uploaded. Through this and our many other efforts at Project Interfaith, we are hoping to ignite a movement for people to openly and respectfully learn, talk and share about topics which are typically taboo but often define our interactions and experiences as humans: identity, religion, spirituality and culture. At RavelUnravel.com, users can watch videos, comment on videos and utilize discussion guides and educational resources.

== Programming ==
Project Interfaith engages people of all faiths, beliefs, and cultures through online interactive spaces as well as local, face-to-face programming. Various media, particularly social media tools, have expanded the mission and work of the organization to regional, national, and international levels, enabling Project Interfaith to reach people from across the globe in its mission and work. In addition to online and local programming, the organization offers resources for understanding to all and specialized information for educators and healthcare providers.

=== Interfaith Arts Programs ===
Project Interfaith Arts Programs use the arts to teach about and explore religious and cultural diversity. Examples include Interfaith Architecture Tour, Interfaith Storytelling Festival, and Images of Faith Interfaith Exhibit.

=== Community Conversations ===
Project Interfaith's Community Conversations Annual Speaker Series bring nationally renowned speakers to Omaha to educate and engage audiences on issues of faith, religion, identity, interfaith relations, and religious and cultural diversity. Examples include NPR Speaking of Faith host Krista Tippett, CBS Mideast Analyst and bestselling author Reza Aslan, New Testament Scholar Dr. Amy-Jill Levine, First Amendment scholar Dr. Charles C. Haynes, and Islam expert Dr. John Esposito.

=== Topical Community Programs ===
Project Interfaith addresses a wide variety of timely topics of interest to the community. Examples include the Jewish-Christian-Muslim Study Circle, Interfaith Youth Service Project, and Community Mosaic Video Project, which is now known as RavelUnravel.

=== Religious and Cultural Diversity Resources ===
Project Interfaith offers resources for Professionals that provide trainings, workshops, and resources to prepare and support professionals in serving religiously and culturally diverse populations. Project Interfaith currently targets the following professions: Professional Care Givers, Health Care Providers, Educators, Social Workers, and Social Service Providers.

== Closing ==
Project Interfaith closed its doors in February 2015. The website, RavelUnravel.com is not currently active. Other Project Interfaith resources are now hosted by WorldFaith.org.”
