= Azza Karam =

Egyptian professor

- عزة كرم
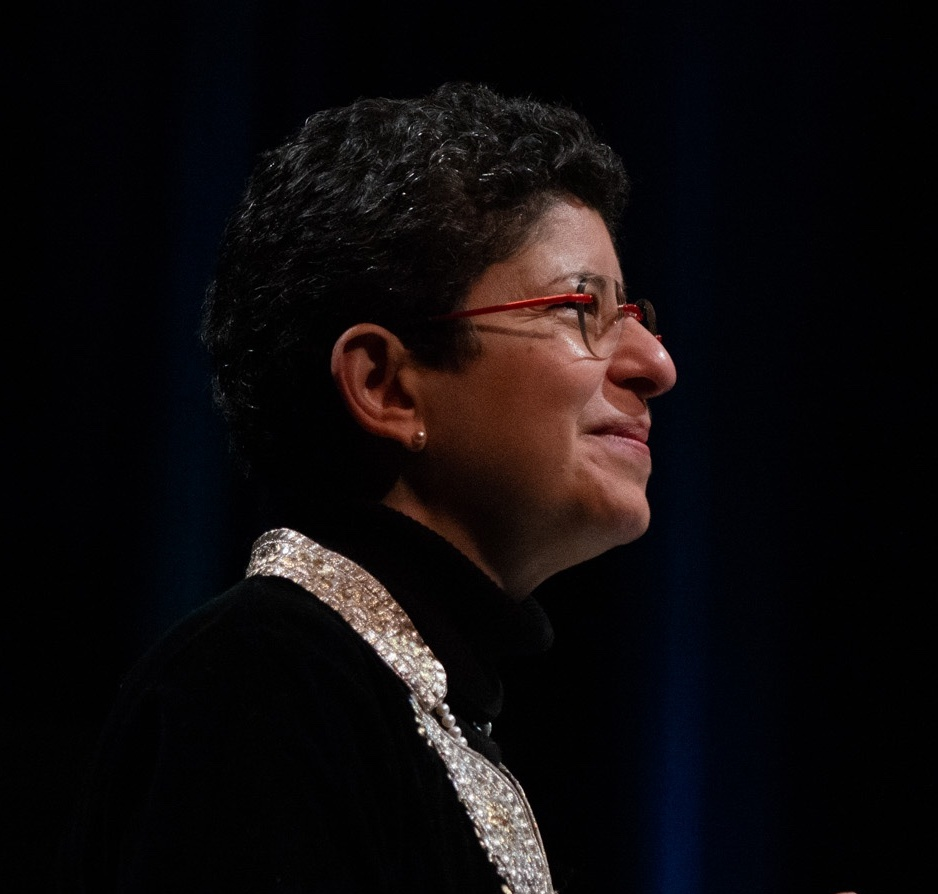
- Azza Karam
- Born: 1968 (age 57–58); Cairo, Egypt
- Honors: Honorary Doctorate from John Cabot University (2022)

Academic background
- Education: American University in Cairo (B.A. 1988); International Institute of Social Studies (M.A. 1990); University of Amsterdam (Ph.D. 1996)

Academic work
- Discipline: Political science, international relations, development studies
- Notable works: Transnational Political Islam: Religion, Ideology and Power (2004); Women, Islamisms and the State: Contemporary Feminisms in Egypt (1998)

Azza Karam (Arabic: عزة كرم) is an Egyptian professor and author who has worked in integrating religion and sustainable development at the United Nations, at Religions for Peace on interfaith collaboration, and contributed to strengthening the role of religion with the United Nations. From 2003 to 2019, she worked in advisor positions for the United Nations, including at the United Nations Population Fund and United Nations Development Programme.

== Early life and education ==
Karam grew up in Egypt and India. She grew up in a conservative Egyptian Muslim family, but had a Hindu nanny while living in India. Karam has said that seeing both her parents praying and nanny's puja from a young age sparked her interest in religion and religious collaboration. Her father was a diplomat, so Karam traveled frequently throughout her childhood.

Karam earned a B.A. in Economics and Business Administration from American University in Cairo in 1988. She earned an M.A. from the International Institute of Social Studies in 1990. Karam earned a Ph.D. Cum Laude in Environmental Sciences in 1996 from the University of Amsterdam.

== Career ==
From 2000 until 2004, Karam worked as the head of the Global Women of Faith Network at Religions for Peace. During this period she spoke about the range of identities for Muslims in the United States in the period following the September 11 attacks, and the impact of war and conflict. After this time, she moved to the United Nations in New York where she worked as Senior Advisor from 2004 to 2007 at the United Nations Development Programme's Arab Bureau, where she coordinated the Arab Human Development Reports. Thereafter, from 2007 to 2019, she worked at the United Nations Population Fund (UNFPA) serving as Senior Advisor on Culture. In 2010, she founded and chaired the United Nations Inter-Agency Task Force on Religion and Development. In 2018, Karam coordinated the establishment of the United Nations Multi-Faith Advisory Council, which includes over 40 religious non-governmental organizations and provides guidance to the United Nations.

In 2019, she was elected as the first woman, first Muslim and first North African to hold the position of Secretary General at Religions for Peace in the organization's 50-year history. She resigned from her position at Religions for Peace in July 2023.

Karam is the founding President and CEO of the consulting firm Lead Integrity.

== Teaching ==
Karam taught as a lecturer at the School of Politics at the Queen's University of Belfast, Northern Ireland from 1998 to 2000.

She has also lectured at institutions of higher education in the United States and Europe, including at the United States Military Academy (USMA) West Point, New York from 2002 until 2018. She became a Professor of Religion and Development at the Vrije Universiteit Amsterdam in 2019, where she held the position of Religion and Sustainable Development Chair for five years. In 2024, Karam became an affiliate professor at the Ansari Institute for Global Engagement with Religion at Notre Dame University in South Bend, Indiana.

== Selected publications ==
- Karam, A. (1997-12-08). Women, Islamisms and the State: Contemporary Feminisms in Egypt. Springer. ISBN 978-0-230-37159-0.
- Karam, Azza M. (1999). "Islamisms and the decivilising processes of globalisation". Anthropology, Development and Modernities. Routledge. doi:10.4324/9780203450895-11 (inactive 11 July 2025). ISBN 978-0-203-45089-5.
- Karam, Azza (2004). Transnational Political Islam: Religion, Ideology and Power. London: Pluto Press. ISBN 978-0-7453-1625-3.
- Ballington, Julie; Karam, Azza M., eds. (2005). Women in parliament: beyond numbers. Handbook series (Revised ed.). Stockholm, Sweden: International IDEA. ISBN 978-91-85391-19-6. OCLC 71006907.
- Karam, Azza (2015-07-03). "Faith-Inspired Initiatives to Tackle the Social Determinants of Child Marriage". The Review of Faith & International Affairs. 13 (3): 59–68. doi:10.1080/15570274.2015.1075754. ISSN 1557-0274.

== Awards and honors ==
- Honorary Doctorate of Humane Letters from John Cabot University (Rome, Italy) in 2022.
- Listed as one of The Muslim 500 - The World's 500 Most Influential Muslims, from 2020 to 2023.
- The Spirit of the United Nations Award (2015), Committee for Spirituality and Global Concerns at the United Nations.
- Distinguished Alumni Award (2009), American University in Cairo
