= Kim Bobo =

American Christian and workers' rights activist

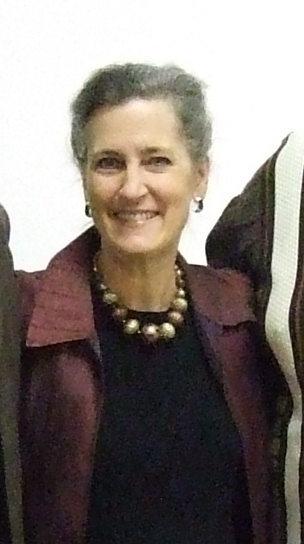
- Bobo in 2009
- Born: Kimberly Ann Bobo; 1954 (age 71–72); Cincinnati, Ohio, US
- Education: Barnard College; New School for Social Research
- Occupation: Labor activist
- Known for: Founding Interfaith Worker Justice
- Spouses: Stephen Coats (died 2013); David Orr (m. 2017)

Kimberly Ann Bobo (born 1954) is an American religious and workers' rights activist, and former executive director of the Virginia Interfaith Center for Public Policy (VICPP), a non-partisan advocacy coalition based in Richmond, Virginia. Bobo is a nationally known promoter of social justice who leads VICPP's advocacy, outreach, and development work. She wrote a book on faith-based organizing entitled Lives Matter: A Handbook for Christian Organizing.

Bobo moved to Virginia from Chicago, where she founded and served as executive director of Interfaith Worker Justice, the nation's largest network of people of faith engaging in local and national actions to improve wages, benefits, and conditions for workers. Prior to that, Bobo was national organizing director for Bread for the World and an instructor at the Midwest Academy. In 1991, she founded the Chicago Interfaith Committee on Worker Issues. Leading efforts for a living wage, she is widely quoted in national newspapers and broadcast media as an expert on worker justice issues. She has also written books and articles on wage issues and community organizing.

== Personal life ==
Born in Cincinnati, Ohio, and raised a conservative evangelical, Bobo graduated from Barnard College in New York City with a bachelor's degree in religion. She later received a master's degree in economics from the New School for Social Research in New York.

Bobo is married to David Orr, a long-time Chicago reform politician. She has twin sons from her previous marriage to Stephen Coats, who died in 2013.

Bobo is a member of Wesley United Methodist Church in Richmond, where she sings in the choir. She served as the choir director at Good News Community Church (UCC) for 27 years.

== Career ==
In 1976, Bobo became director of organizing for Bread for the World, a Christian organization that works to relieve and combat hunger. During this time, she wrote her first book, Lives Matter: A Handbook for Christian Organizing.

Bobo left Bread for the World in 1986 and became an instructor at the Midwest Academy, a community organizing training institute in Chicago, Illinois. She focused on low-income housing organizations and other social change organizations. While at the Midwest Academy, Bobo and her colleagues co-authored Organizing for Social Change, a fundamental text in community-based organizing.

In 1989, Bobo became involved with the Pittston Coal strike by coal miners at Pittston Coal. Attempting to organize religious leaders to support the workers, she was startled to find that almost no religious organizations had labor liaisons. She started an informal network of religious leaders to share information about campaigns for worker justice that year.

In 1991, Bobo founded the Chicago Interfaith Committee on Worker Issues. It was an all-volunteer group led by Bobo and four influential Chicago religious leaders.

In 1996, using a $5,000 inheritance from her grandmother, Bobo launched the National Interfaith Committee for Worker Justice. The organization initially was run out of her home. By 1998, the organization had 29 affiliates throughout the country. The group changed its name to Interfaith Worker Justice in 2005, by which time it had grown to 59 local affiliates and a full-time staff of 10.

IWJ has been active on a number of workers' rights and worker justice issues. It has developed 20 workers centers around the country, and programs such as “Labor in the Pulpits” and “Seminary Summer,” which "places seminary and rabbinical students with unions for summer internships." In 2012, when Walmart was celebrating its 50th anniversary, she called on the corporation to ensure a living wage for its employees.

In 2017, Bobo became Executive Director for the Virginia Interfaith Center for Public Policy (VICPP), in Richmond, Virginia where she has led many economic, racial, social, and environmental justice legislative victories. She mobilized a historic faith advocacy campaign and played a leadership role in the statewide Healthcare for All Virginians coalition advocating Medicaid expansion, which passed in 2018. During the 2019 Virginia General Assembly, Bobo led VICPP's efforts to win two wage theft reform bills: one to remove the Jim Crow exemptions from the Virginia Minimum Wage, and the other to require employers to provide a paystub to workers explaining how they are paid. VICPP was also involved in numerous other legislation, including tuition equity, environmental justice, tenants' rights, and criminal justice reform. Bobo publicized the findings of "The High Cost of Being Poor in Virginia," a report released in October 2016 by the Virginia Interfaith Center for Public Policy and the Coalition on Human Needs. With the help of Rev. David Gortner, of the Virginia Theological Seminary she co-founded a private living wage program in Alexandria, Virginia. The program offers certification and recognition to businesses that pay their workers a wage in line with living costs of the city.

== Awards and honors ==
Bobo was named one of 14 “Faith Leaders to Watch” in 2014 by the Center for American Progress, and one of Utne Reader’s “50 Visionaries Who Are Changing Your World” in 2009.

Bobo was selected for the 2012 Pacem in Terris Peace and Freedom Award. The award commemorates Pope John XXIII's 1963 encyclical letter, Pacem in terris, which means "Peace on Earth". Bobo joins previous award recipients including Dorothy Day, Martin Luther King Jr., Mother Teresa, and Archbishop Desmond Tutu.

== Selected publications ==
=== Books ===
- Wage Theft in America: Why Millions of Working Americans Are Not Getting Paid – And What We Can Do About It. The New Press. 2008. Available at www.iwj.org or www.wagetheft.org
- Lives Matter: A Handbook for Christian Organizing. Lanham, Md.: Sheed and Ward, 1986. ISBN 0-934134-87-1

=== Co-authored books ===
- Bobo, Kim, et al. Organizing for Social Change. 2d ed. Washington: Seven Locks Press, 2001. ISBN 0-929765-41-9

Awards
Preceded by Álvaro Leonel Ramazzini Imeri	Pacem in Terris Award; 2012	Succeeded by Jean Vanier
