= Richard Peace =

American theologian

Richard Peace is an American theologian, being the Robert Boyd Munger Professor of Evangelism and Spiritual Formation at Fuller Theological Seminary.
