= Interfaith greetings in Indonesia =

Interfaith greetings (Indonesian: Salam Lintas Agama), sometimes referred as Bhinneka greetings (Indonesian: Salam Kebhinekaan), are often used to open formal meetings in Indonesia. The phrases combine the greeting phrases of several or all major religions in Indonesia. These greeting phrases have become widespread during the Reformasi era in the aftermath of fall of Suharto in 1998. Politicians and public figures often use them to emphasize the multireligious identity of Indonesia, though Islamic conservatives have criticized them.

== History ==
During the Liberal democracy period in Indonesia and Guided Democracy that followed it under Sukarno, the common phrase used in speech and formal meetings was "Merdeka", the Indonesian and Malay word for independence or freedom, or variations of it such as "Salam Merdeka". Sukarno often used this phrase during his speeches and orations. However, he later used the Islamic greeting phrase "Assalamualaikum" to open the session of People's Consultative Assembly on 22 June 1966 addressing the issue of 30 September Movement to the parliament, at which his speech was rejected, resulting in the transfer of power to Suharto. During the New Order, Suharto often opened speeches with the phrase "Hadirin yang berbahagia" which roughly means "the happy audiences". However, he was also observed in several occasions using "Assalamualaikum" as a greeting (sometimes used bismillahirrahmanirrahim).

Abdurrahman Wahid added "Salam sejahtera bagi kita semua", roughly means "good upon us all", mostly used by Indonesian Christians, after the Islamic greeting during his presidency. This phrase often has "Shalom" added after it. During the presidency of Megawati Sukarnoputri, she additionally appended "om swastiastu" (roughly means "I wish good upon you"), a greeting phrase used by Indonesian Hindus, especially in Bali. Later, Susilo Bambang Yudhoyono added the Buddhist "namo buddhaya", roughly meaning "praise be to all Buddhas", and "salam kebajikan" means "greetings of virtue", a rough translation of wei de dong tian (惟德動天) in Chinese, attributed to Confucianism. These five together make up the most common form used in Indonesia nowadays and are increasingly popular within public officials and politicians.

However, there are also regional variations in addition to these five usually used by local politicians or officials, usually ethnic greetings in regional languages such as "Sampurasun" (which roughly means an apology, delivered before conversation), a traditional Sundanese greeting, "rahayu", roughly meaning "greetings" or "safety" which is attributed to Javanese culture especially among followers of Kejawèn, or "Adil ka' talino, bacuramin ka' saruga, basengat ka'jubata" (means "just to fellow humans, reflecting to the Heaven, the Breath of Life comes from God") which is a Dayak traditional greeting phrase. There is also a relatively new and controversial addition "Salam Pancasila" by Yudian Wahyudi, head of Pancasila Ideology Development Agency. This emulates the past greeting "Salam Merdeka", used by Sukarno and popularized again by Megawati. Yudian argued that the addition of "Salam Pancasila" could bridge religious differences within Indonesia and be more flexible.

== Phrase ==
The common full greeting, containing all five parts, is:

Assalamualaikum, Salam sejahtera bagi kita semua, Shalom, Salve, Om swastiastu, Namo buddhaya, Salam kebajikan

Variations exist, such as combining or replacing "Salam Sejahtera" with "Shalom" entirely as both represent Christianity, in addition to adding greeting phrases in regional languages or for traditional religions.

Salve was added to the greeting during the presidency of Prabowo Subianto.

The closing using the same parts is as follows:

Wassalamualaikum, Shalom, Salve, Om Santi Santi Santi Om, Namo buddhaya, Salam kebajikan

== Criticism ==
Islamic conservatives have criticized the use of such greeting phrases in official meetings. The East Java branch of the Indonesian Ulema Council (MUI) criticized the widespread usage of the phrase and urged Indonesian Muslims to not use it. The announcement to urge Muslims not to use it was released through an official letter in November 2019. The chief of East Java branch of MUI argued that religious pluralism is forbidden in Islam, religions should be exclusive, and mixing the phrases is not a form of tolerance but violation of Islamic teaching. The letter was harshly criticized by Islamic Network of Anti-Discrimination (JIAD) as intolerant.
