= Interfaith officiants =

Interfaith Officiants are trained in world religions and inter-spirituality and can help people in identifying their own spiritual beliefs through a process of spiritual self-discovery. They can also officiate at events such as weddings.

== Overview ==
Interfaith Officiants come from many different faith backgrounds and have different philosophies and personal theologies, yet are well-versed in a multitude of religious traditions. They share a commitment to serving individuals, couples and families in a very personal and respectful way, building ceremonies around the wishes, preferences, beliefs and practices of the clients they serve.

In addition to celebrant-focused roles, many Interfaith Officiants receive ordination and formal spiritual formation through training programmes rooted in interfaith ministry. These ministers are often called to serve in weddings, funerals, baby blessings, end-of-life support, and spiritual accompaniment, drawing from diverse religious and philosophical traditions.

A number of Interfaith Seminaries and religious institutions train Interfaith Officiants, which are also sometimes called Interfaith Ministers or Interfaith Celebrants. Programmes like those offered by OneSpirit Interfaith Foundation (UK, with global programmes), One Spirit Learning Alliance (US), and the Chaplaincy Institute (US) reflect this wider vocational path. While they may serve the public independently, many also work in chaplaincy, education, and community leadership roles.

Interfaith Officiants differ from Chaplains in that they usually work independently and serve the public at large, as opposed to Chaplains, who are employed by the military, hospitals, or other institutions. However, like hospital chaplains, Interfaith Officiants generally do not proselytise on behalf of any one faith tradition, but respect and honour them all.

== Council of Interfaith Communities of the United States ==
In 2010, the Council of Interfaith Communities of the United States was created. This is an umbrella for interfaith-interspiritual ministers who are going beyond celebrant status to engage and organize their couples in a lifetime community ministry to support interfaith families. The services of the minister include all of the life celebrations found in traditional faith organizations.

The CIC-USA has members from the US and Mexico, including The New Seminary (New York), Chaplaincy Institute for Arts and Interfaith Ministry (Berkeley, CA), Chaplaincy Institute of Maine (Maine), the American Institute for Holistic Theology (Alabama), the Interfaith Academy for Interfaith Studies (Texas and Mexico), and All-Paths Divinity School (Los Angeles, CA).

Across the pond, OneSpirit Interfaith Foundation, originally inspired by the US-based New Seminary and launched in the United Kingdom in 1996, is now an independent educational charity serving a global interfaith community.
