= Diana L. Eck =

American theologian (born 1945)

- Born: July 5, 1945 (age 81); Tacoma, Washington
- Education: Harvard University
- Spouse: Dorothy Austin (m. 2004; died 2026)
- Awards: Unitarian Universalist Melcher Award (1994) and the Grawemeyer Award (1995) for Encountering God: A Spiritual Journey from Bozeman to Banaras

Diana Louise Eck (born July 5, 1945), a scholar of religious studies, is the Professor of Comparative Religion and Indian Studies Emerita and Frederic Wertham Research Professor of Law and Psychiatry in Society at Harvard University. She retired from teaching duties in 2024.

Eck is the author of Banaras, City of Light and Darshan: Seeing the Divine Image in India. She served on the Humanities jury for the Infosys Prize in 2019.

== Education ==
Eck received a B.A. in religious studies from Smith College in 1967, and an M.A. in Indian history from The School of Oriental and African Studies, University of London in 1968. In 1976 she received a Ph.D. from Harvard University in the comparative study of religion.

== Interest in other religions ==
Since 1991, Diana Eck has also turned her attention to the United States and has been heading a research team at Harvard University to explore the new religious diversity of the United States and its meaning for the American pluralist experiment. The Pluralism Project has developed an affiliation with many other colleges and universities across the country and around the world. In 1994, Diana Eck and the Pluralism Project published "World Religions in Boston, A Guide to Communities and Resources" which introduces the many religious traditions and communities in Boston, Massachusetts: from Native Americans, Christians, Jews, Muslims, Buddhists, Hindus, Sikhs, and Jains, to Zoroastrians. In 1997, Diana Eck and the Pluralism Project published an educational multimedia CD-ROM, On Common Ground: World Religions in America (Columbia University Press). This CD-ROM received awards from Media & Methods, EdPress, and Educom. These resources are online at www.pluralism.org.

In 2001, her book A New Religious America: How a "Christian Country" Has Become the World’s Most Religiously Diverse Nation was published. It deals with religious diversity in the United States since 1965. In 2009, she delivered the Gifford Lectures on The Age of Pluralism at the University of Edinburgh.

== Leadership at Harvard ==
Eck found The Pluralism Project at Harvard in 1991 and has served as its Director since that time.

In July 2025, Deck became the Mittal Institute’s interim faculty director, and in that capacity she oversaw a controversial nine-day recitation of the Ramayana in August 2026. Eck initially agreed to lend the Mittal Institute's name to the event, later rescinded under faculty pressure, and personally attended the event "“out of personal academic interest.”

Eck is former faculty dean of Lowell House.

== Personal life ==
Raised as a Christian Methodist in Montana, Eck is a member of Harvard Epworth United Methodist Church in Cambridge. She has worked for many years in Interfaith Relations with the World Council of Churches, and the National Council of Churches.

Eck's mother, Dorothy Eck, was a Montana State Senator for twenty years, president of the Montana League of Women Voters, and a delegate to Montana's 1972 Constitutional Convention. Eck's father, Hugo Eck, was an architect and Professor of Architecture at Montana State University.

Eck married the Reverend Dorothy Austin on July 4, 2004, after 28 years of partnership. In 1998, Eck and Austin became the first same-sex couple to be masters (later faculty deans) of Lowell House, one of the twelve undergraduate residences at Harvard. After spending 50 years with Eck, in January 2026, Austin died at their home in Massachusetts.

== Concept of pluralism ==
Pluralism is not diversity alone, but the energetic engagement with diversity. Diversity can and has meant the creation of religious ghettoes with little between or among them. Today, religious diversity is a given, but pluralism is not a given; it is an achievement.

Diana Eck

Eck's interest in other religions combined with her own 'Christian pluralist' faith led her to develop her concept of pluralism. Pluralism, for Eck, is the best response to the challenges of religious diversity. The term pluralism has been understood in numerous ways but Eck is clear to distinguish between pluralism and plurality—two words which are often used interchangeably and without distinction. Whilst plurality is the fact of diversity, pluralism is a response to that diversity—and in Eck's account, it is an active, positive response.

Eck lays out three prevalent responses to religious diversity: exclusivism, inclusivism and pluralism. An exclusivist approach takes the position that "my way is the only way". An inclusivist might consider that there are grains of truth in other ways, but ultimately understands that "my way is the better way". In contrast, a pluralist response seeks to find new ways of positively engaging with diversity, exploring differences whilst seeking common understanding. On the website for Harvard University's Pluralism Project, Eck describes the four principles of pluralism:

1. Pluralism is not diversity alone, but the energetic engagement with diversity
2. Pluralism is not tolerance, but the active seeking of understanding across lines of difference
3. Pluralism is not relativism, but the encounter of commitments
4. Pluralism is based on dialogue.

Eck's concept of pluralism has been influential within the wider interfaith movement, and is cited by the Interfaith Youth Core as foundational to its organizational values.

== Awards ==
In 1995, Eck was the recipient of the University of Louisville and Louisville Presbyterian Theological Seminary Grawemeyer Award in Religion.

In 1996, Prof. Eck was appointed to a U.S. State Department Advisory Committee on Religious Freedom Abroad, a twenty-member commission charged with advising the Secretary of State on enhancing and protecting religious freedom in the overall context of human rights.

In 1998, President Bill Clinton and the National Endowment for the Humanities awarded her the National Humanities Medal for her work on religious pluralism in the United States.

In 2002, Diana Eck received the Martin Marty Award for the Public Understanding of Religion from the American Academy of Religion.

In 2003, Diana Eck received the Montana Humanities Award from the Governor of Montana.

In 2007, Professor Eck was made a lifetime member of the Girl Scouts of the USA.

In 2013, Diana Eck was elected an Honorary Fellow by the Governing Body on the recommendation of the Academic Board of her alma mater, SOAS, University of London.

== Books ==
- Eck, Diana L. (1968). J. Krishnamurti: the pathless way. New York: International Center for Integrative Studies. OCLC 6733472. (14 pages)
- Eck, Diana L. (1998). Darśan: seeing the divine image in India. New York: Columbia University Press. ISBN 9780231112659.
- Eck, Diana L. (1982). Banaras: city of light. New York: Knopf. ISBN 9780710202369.

Reprinted as: Eck, Diana L. (1999). Banaras: city of light (2nd ed.). New York: Columbia University Press. ISBN 9780231114479.

- Eck, Diana L. (1986). Jain, Devaki (ed.). Speaking of faith: cross-cultural perspectives on women, religion, and social change. London: Women's Press. ISBN 9780704340169.
- Eck, Diana L. (1987). The manyness of God. Canton, New York: St. Lawrence University. OCLC 25126361. (Kathryn Fraser Mackay lecture, 1985: 16 pages)
- Eck, Diana L.; Mallison, Françoise (1991). Devotion divine: Bhakti traditions from the regions of India: studies in honour of Charlotte Vaudeville. Groningen, Netherlands: Egbert Forsten Publishing. ISBN 9789069800455.
- Eck, Diana L. (2003). Encountering God: a spiritual journey from Bozeman to Banaras (2nd ed.). Boston: Beacon Press. ISBN 9780807073018.

Won the Unitarian Universalist Melcher Award (1994) and the Grawemeyer Book Award (1995).

- Eck, Diana L. (2002). On common ground world religions in america (2nd ed.). New York: Columbia University Press. ISBN 9780231126649. Multimedia presentation on CD ROM.
- Eck, Diana L. (2001). A new religious America: how a "Christian country" has now become the world's most religiously diverse nation. San Francisco: HarperSanFrancisco. ISBN 9780060621599.
- Eck, Diana L. (2012). India: a sacred geography. New York: Harmony Books. ISBN 9780385531917.
