= Interfaith Partners of South Carolina =

U.S. nonprofit organization

- Abbreviation: IPSC
- Formation: 2010; 16 years ago
- Type: Nonprofit
- Region served: South Carolina
- Website: interfaithpartnersofsc.org

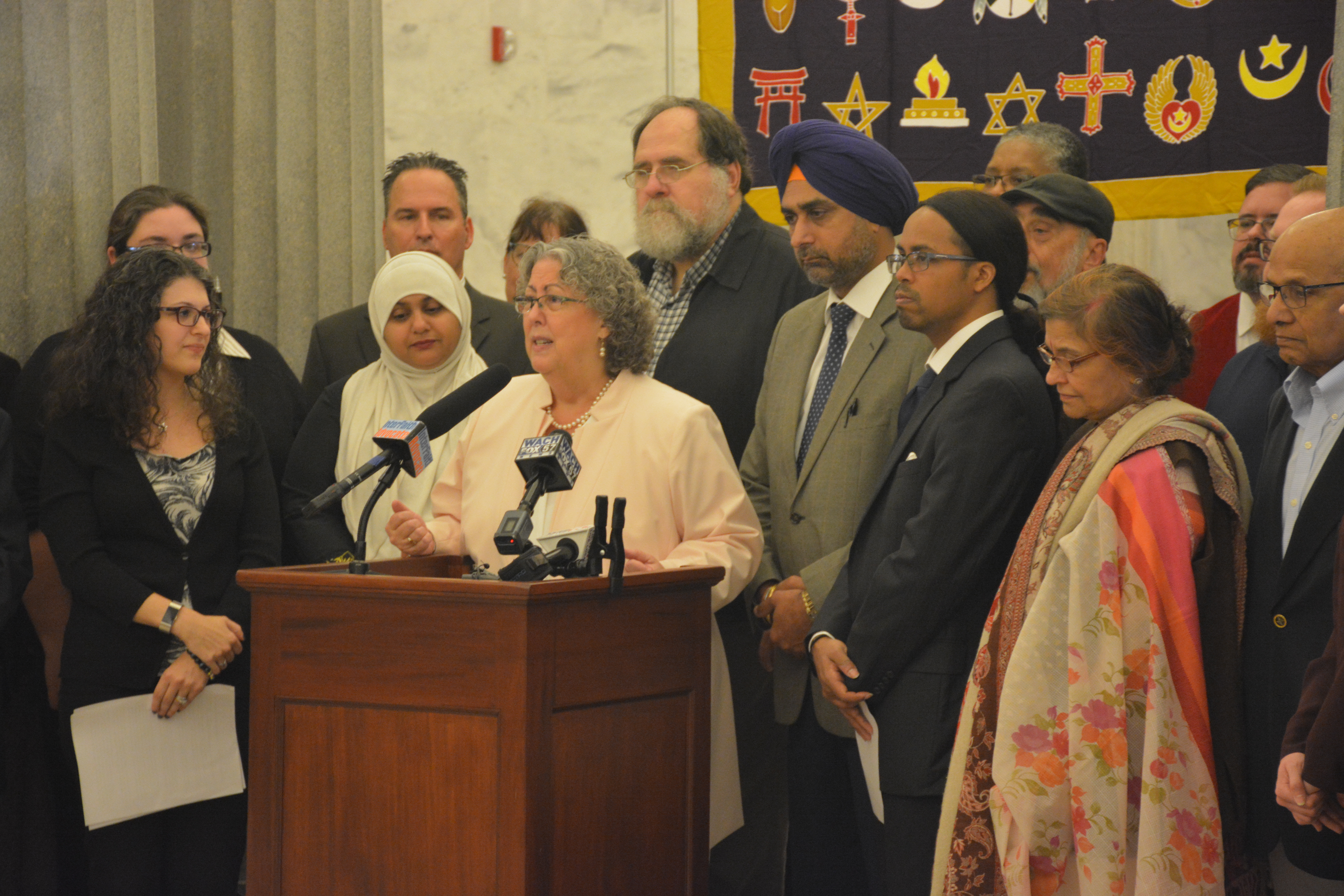
Leadership of Interfaith Partners of South Carolina holding a media event at the S.C. State House in 2019

Interfaith Partners of South Carolina (IPSC) is an organization formed in 2010 to promote better understanding among people of the many religious, spiritual, and secular-ethical traditions throughout South Carolina.

== History ==
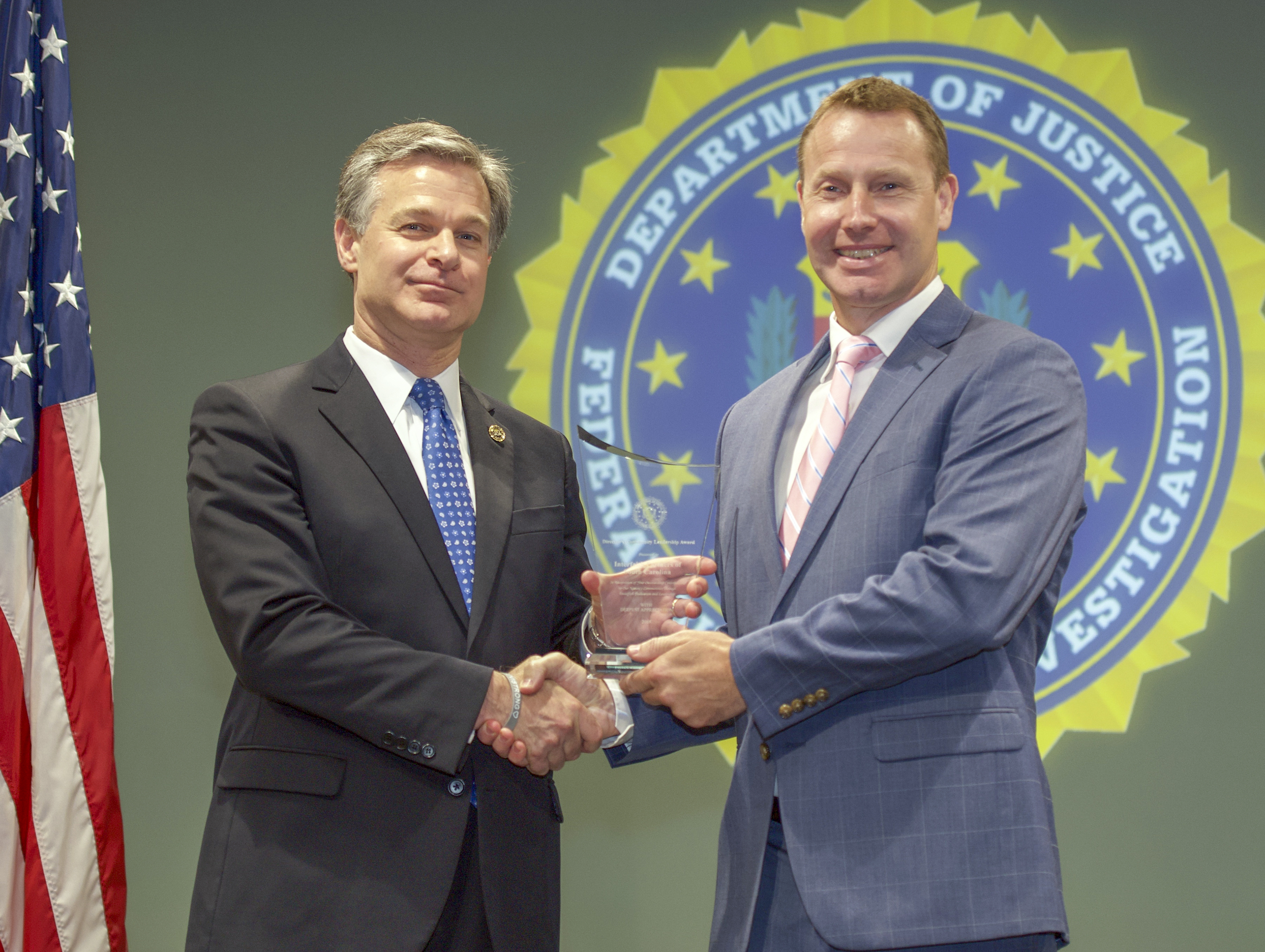
FBI Director Christopher Wray presents Dr. Adrian Bird, Chair of Interfaith Partners of South Carolina, with the Director's Community Leadership Award, 2019.

In a state often noted for its predominantly conservative and religiously Christian population, Interfaith Partners of South Carolina works to draw public attention to the broad diversity of religious, spiritual and secular-ethical traditions and practice in South Carolina. Regional affiliated chapters include Aiken and Florence.

Initially, IPSC held meetings of an advisory committee drawn from around the state, occasional panel discussions, festivals, and book studies. Additionally, as an effort to recruit wider participation in the Charter For Compassion, there was a project of author and religious studies pertaining to scholar Karen Armstrong.

A key initiative since 2011 has been South Carolina Interfaith Month. Beginning that year, then-Governor Nikki Haley issued an official proclamation declaring January as South Carolina Interfaith Harmony Month. Her successor, Governor Henry McMaster, has continued to issue the proclamation. IPSC has held a yearly kickoff media conference the last week of December at which time a calendar of January events has been announced. Open events have been held by houses of worship and religious and other groups for the entire month. In 2019 and 2020, the mayors of Charleston and Aiken (South Carolina) issued similar proclamations in their respective cities in collaboration with IPSC.

The group supports minority groups and those at risk because of hate speech. Some examples are:

- Public statement supporting Syrian refugees from that country's civil war
- Statement expressing sorrow and concern after the 2015 Mother Emanuel shooting in Charleston, South Carolina, and after the 2019 Christchurch, New Zealand, mosque shootings.
- Following a bomb threat to the Jewish Community Center of Columbia in 2017, partnership with Jewish leaders to devise a plan for building community support for the Center through a spring interfaith festival.
- Partnership in developing and implementing Action Plan for Election Season Peace in the weeks leading up to the 2020 presidential election and continuing following the January 6, 2021 Capitol riot in Washington, D.C. (according to the organization’s website)

IPSC leadership visited the FBI in Washington, D.C., in 2019 to receive the Director's Community Leadership Award for the state. Regional affiliated chapters include Aiken and Florence.

== Mission ==
"The mission of Interfaith Partners of South Carolina is to bring together people of diverse religious, spiritual, and secular paths throughout our state to cultivate a more harmonious community."
