= Religions for Peace =

International religious organization

- Type: Non-governmental organization (NGO)
- Headquarters: 777 United Nations Plaza, 9th Floor New York, NY 10017
- Members: Over 97 countries
- Website: www.rfp.org

Religions for Peace is an international coalition of representatives from the world's religions dedicated to promoting world peace. It was founded in 1970.

The International Secretariat's headquarters is in New York City, with regional conferences in Europe, Asia, Middle East, Africa and the Americas. Religions for Peace enjoys consultative status with the United Nations Economic and Social Council (ECOSOC), with UNESCO and with UNICEF. From August 2019 until June 2023, Azza Karam was the Secretary General, proceeding William F. Vendley. In February 2024, Dr. Francis Kuria Kagema was appointed by the World Council as Secretary General.

World Assemblies
1970	Kyoto, Japan
1974	Leuven, Belgium
1979	Princeton, New Jersey, United States
1984	Nairobi, Kenya
1989	Melbourne, Australia
1994	Riva del Garda, Italy
1999	Amman, Jordan
2006	Kyoto, Japan
2013	Vienna, Austria
2019	Lindau, Germany

The 2020 Sunhak Peace Prize was awarded to President Macky Sall of Senegal and Bishop Munib Younan of Religions for Peace.

In 2020 Religions For Peace was nominated for the "Freedom of Worship" Four Freedoms Award.

== Operations and Global Networks ==
Religions for Peace operates with the support of Interreligious Councils (IRCs) established in six global regions. The leaders of these IRCs are representatives of religious communities who mobilize people of all faith traditions to collaborate on shared goals.

=== Global Women of Faith Network ===
The Global Women of Faith Network is a women's collective led by the International Women’s Coordinating Committee, which is composed of 11 women from various faith traditions. In 2023, Religions for Peace launched the Women of Excellence in Multi-Religious Action Award to recognize the contributions of women of faith and women-led initiatives in peacebuilding and interfaith cooperation.

=== Multireligious Humanitarian Fund ===
The Multireligious Humanitarian Fund supports 20 multi-faith projects across 20 countries. Originally launched during the COVID-19 pandemic, the fund continues to support grassroots humanitarian efforts. Among its supported initiatives are:

- Emergency humanitarian assistance for refugees and internally displaced peoples in Cameroon, led by the Cameroonian Association for Interreligious Dialogue (ACADIR)
- Crisis response for displaced people in Ukraine, implemented by Malteser International – Order of Malta Worldwide Relief

=== Events ===
The 1st Assembly on Women, Faith, and Diplomacy was held from 10–13 November 2020. The event brought together leaders from government, civil society, and multilateral institutions. Plenaries focused on topics such as leadership, gender equality, values-inspired education, and the role of women in diplomacy.
