= Eboo Patel =

American activist and political consultant

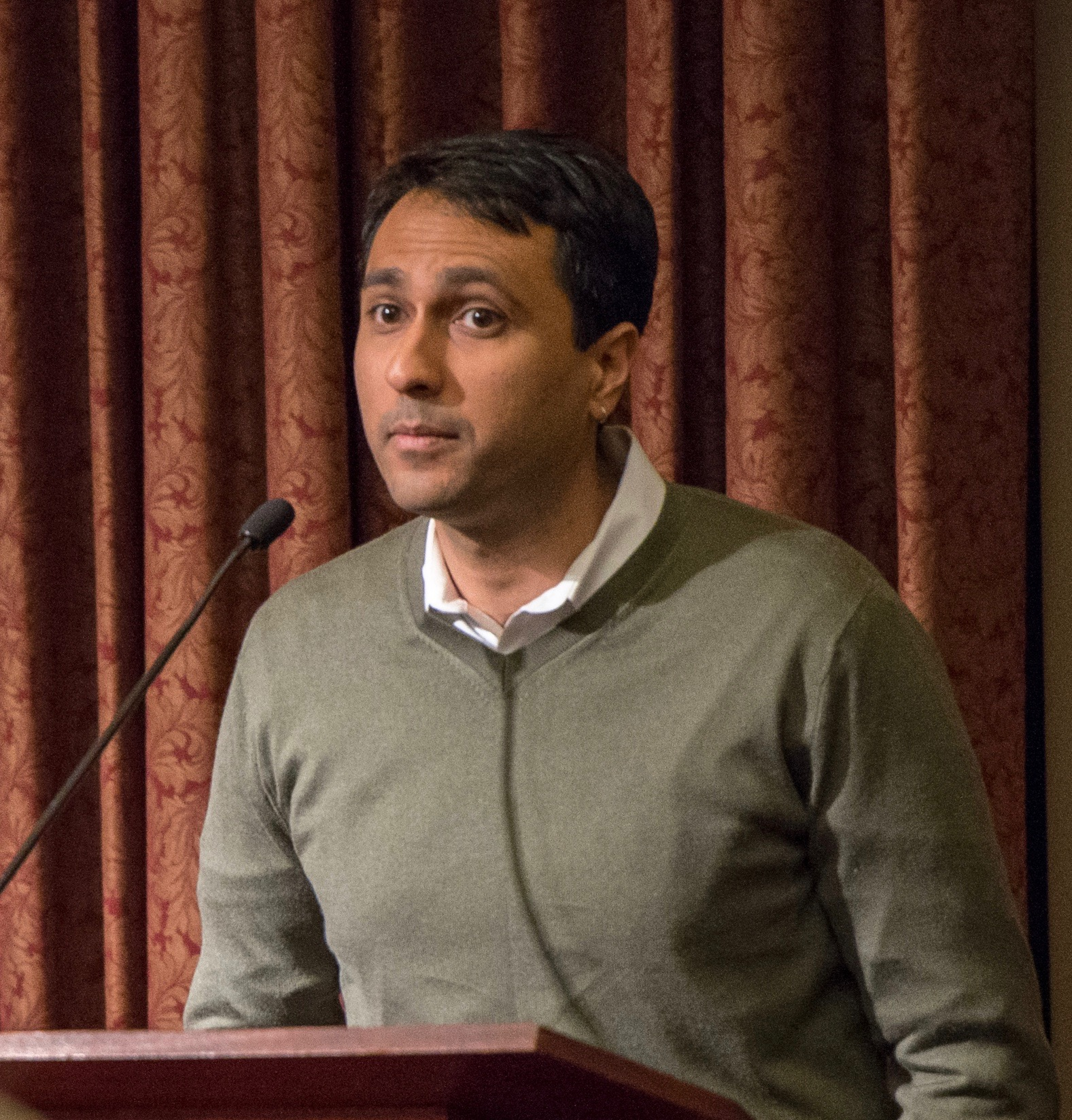
- Patel in 2013

Academic background
- Education: University of Illinois at Urbana-Champaign, Oxford University

Academic work
- Discipline: Sociology
- Notable ideas: Interfaith America

Eboo Patel is an American Ismaili of Gujarati Indian heritage and founder and president of Interfaith America (previously known as Interfaith Youth Core), a Chicago-based international nonprofit that aims to promote interfaith cooperation. Patel was a member of President Barack Obama's inaugural Advisory Council on Faith-Based Neighborhood Partnerships.

== Biography ==
Patel grew up in Glen Ellyn, Illinois, where he attended Glenbard South High School. He attended the University of Illinois at Urbana-Champaign for his undergraduate studies and earned a degree in sociology. He has a doctorate in the sociology of religion from Oxford University, where he studied on a Rhodes Scholarship.

Patel details his life and career extensively in his 2007 autobiography, Acts of Faith. In the book, Patel notes that he became interested in religious diversity in college, where he noticed that conversations on multiculturalism and multiple identities did not involve religious identity. After graduating from college, he taught at an alternative education program for high school dropouts in Chicago and, inspired partly by Dorothy Day’s Catholic Worker movement, founded a cooperative living community for activists and artists in Chicago's Uptown neighborhood. As an activist, Patel felt that diversity, service, and faith were important parts of civic life but found no community organization that touched on all three, specifically one that worked with young people. In response, he developed the idea for the Interfaith Youth Core, formulated through his relationship with Brother Wayne Teasdale and blessed by the Dalai Lama, that would bring young people of different faiths together around service and dialogue.

While a student at Oxford, Patel ran numerous interfaith youth projects in India, Sri Lanka, and South Africa. He officially founded IFYC in 2002 with a Jewish friend and a $35,000 grant from the Ford Foundation. Today the organization employs approximately 80 people and has a $4-million operating budget.

Patel and IFYC partnered with White House officials in developing President Obama's Interfaith and Community Service Campus Challenge, which invited schools across the nation to make interfaith cooperation a campus priority and launched in 2011. His second book, Sacred Ground: Pluralism, Prejudice, and the Promise of America, was released in August 2012.

== Bibliography ==
- Eboo Patel (2022). We Need to Build: Field Notes for a Diverse Democracy. Beacon Press. ISBN 9780807024065.
- Eboo Patel (2018). Out of Many Faiths: Religious Diversity and the American Promise. Princeton University Press. ISBN 978-0-6911-8272-8.
- Eboo Patel (2016). Interfaith Leadership: A Primer. Beacon Press. ISBN 978-0807033623.
- Eboo Patel (2012). Sacred Ground: Pluralism, Prejudice, and the Promise of America. Beacon Press. ISBN 978-0-8070-7748-1.
- Eboo Patel (2010). Acts of Faith: The Story of an American Muslim, the Struggle for the Soul of a Generation (new ed.). Beacon Press. ISBN 978-0-8070-0622-1.
- Eboo Patel and Adam Davis (2009). Hearing the Call Across Traditions: Readings on Faith and Service. Skylight Paths Publishing. ISBN 978-1-59473-264-5.
- Eboo Patel (2007). Acts of Faith: The Story of an American Muslim, the Struggle for the Soul of a Generation. Beacon Press. ISBN 978-0-8070-7727-6.
- Eboo Patel (2006). Building the Interfaith Youth Movement: Beyond Dialogue to Action.
