= Interfaith Worker Justice =

U.S. nonprofit organization

- Abbreviation: IWJ
- Formation: 1996; 30 years ago
- Founder: Kim Bobo
- Founded at: Chicago, Illinois, US
- Dissolved: December 31, 2021; 4 years ago
- Type: Advocacy organization
- Legal status: 501(c)(3) organization
- Region served: United States
- Co-chairs: Nora Morales; Jeanette Smith
- Revenue: $1.82 million (2017)
- Expenses: $1.53 million (2017)
- Website: iwj.org
- Formerly called: National Interfaith Committee for Worker Justice

Interfaith Worker Justice (IWJ) was a nonprofit and nonpartisan interfaith advocacy network comprising more than 60 worker centers and faith and labor organizations that advanced the rights of working people through grassroots, worker-led campaigns and engagement with diverse faith communities and labor allies. IWJ affiliates took action to shape policy at the local, state and national levels.

As of June 2017, IWJ was governed by a 36-member board of directors.

IWJ closed at the end of 2021.

== History of IWJ ==
Kim Bobo founded Interfaith Worker Justice in 1991 as Chicago Interfaith Committee on Worker Issues. Bobo had previously been director of organizing at Bread for the World and an instructor at the Midwest Academy. In 1989, Bobo became involved with workers' rights campaigns for coal miners. She was startled to find that almost no religious organizations had labor liaisons. She started an informal network of religious leaders to share information about campaigns for worker justice that year.

In 1991, Bobo founded the Chicago Interfaith Committee on Worker Issues. It was an all-volunteer group led by Bobo and four influential Chicago religious leaders.

In 1996, using a $5,000 inheritance from her grandmother, Bobo launched the National Interfaith Committee for Worker Justice. The organization initially was run out of her home.

By 1998, the organization had 29 affiliates throughout the country. The group changed its name to Interfaith Worker Justice in 2005, by which time it had grown to 59 local affiliates and a full-time staff of 10.

In 2015, Kim Bobo stepped down as executive director at IWJ in order to expand on her social justice work as the new executive director for the Virginia Interfaith Center for Public Policy. Rudy López, the former Political Director for the Center for Community Change took Bobo’s place as the new executive director at IWJ. After a brief transition period, Laura Barrett, the former executive director at Center for Health, Environment & Justice (CHEJ), then became the new executive director.

IWJ was active on a number of worker's rights and worker justice issues. It took a lead role in criticizing Wal-Mart for forcing employees to work off the clock, not providing affordable or comprehensive health insurance, and refusing to pay an adequate wage. In 2006, the group sued the United States Department of Labor to obtain the names of migrant agricultural workers who had been victims of unpaid overtime. It was also active in supporting higher wages for workers and the use of unionized laborers in the reconstruction of New Orleans, and condemned the importation of lower-paid illegal immigrants to displace American workers.

Near the end of its existence, IWJ included a national network of more than 60 local interfaith groups, worker centers and student groups, making it the leading national organization working to strengthen the religious community's involvement in issues of workplace justice.

== Issues focus ==
=== Wage theft ===
Interfaith Worker Justice was dedicated to ending wage theft.

Wage theft covers a variety of infractions that occur when workers do not receive their legally or contractually promised wages.

It happens in every industry to millions of workers. Billions of dollars are stolen when employers pay less than minimum wage; refuse overtime pay; force workers to work off the clock; hold back final paychecks; misclassify employees as independent contractors; steal tips; and fail to pay workers at all.

Most commonly wage theft is a violation of the Fair Labor Standards Act (FLSA), which provides for a federal minimum wage and allows states to set their own (higher) minimum wage, and requires employers to pay time and a half for all hours worked above 40 hours per week.

=== Health and safety ===
Millions of individuals in the workforce are working at jobs where they are not guaranteed a safe and healthy work environment.

Immigrants (especially Latino immigrants), low-literacy workers, young workers and low-wage workers are particularly vulnerable to unsafe and unhealthy working conditions. Through grants from NIOSH, the Public Welfare Foundation, and OSHA's Susan Harwood program, Interfaith Worker Justice and members of its national worker center network were rapidly expanding their health and safety work, doing outreach, training, and organizing of workers.

=== Right to organize ===
Interfaith Worker Justice was dedicated to educating, organizing and calling people of faith to stand with workers unions so their voices are heard.

The organization recognized the accomplishments of unions such as the eight-hour workday, social security, anti–child labor laws and the minimum wage and seeks to advance their interests, as they have proven to be the best way for workers to get fair treatment.

=== Immigration reform ===
Interfaith Worker Justice and its labor allies called for comprehensive immigration reform providing a clear path to citizenship and protecting the rights of all workers, regardless of immigration status. As people of faith, the organization recognizes and honors the social and economic contributions made by immigrant workers.

More than 11 million undocumented people are living in this country, including children raised as Americans and workers who have become an integral part of the US economy. Without legal status, immigrant workers are victims of every kind of labor abuse and cannot protect their rights without fear of deportation.

=== Racial justice ===
IWJ worked closely with affiliates, such as the Workers Center for Racial Justice, in order to increase access to quality jobs and strengthen working conditions and job security for ethnic families and communities.

As an organization that seeks to advance the rights of working people, Interfaith Worker Justice was dedicated to providing resources for those facing injustice in the workplace, including workers who face discrimination from employers.

=== Minimum wage ===
Interfaith Worker Justice was a major proponent of the Fight for 15 movement which calls on the government to raise the federal minimum wage to fifteen dollars an hour.

The organization was focused on both raising and indexing the federal minimum wage. Research shows that raising the federal minimum wage would mean a financial lift for nearly 30 million working Americans, no effect on the unemployment rate, a more stimulated economy, and a boost in public health.

Indexing this wage would ensure that it can keep up with rising costs of living.

=== Paid leave ===
More than 40 million workers in the United States, and more than 80 percent of low-wage workers, don't have a single paid sick day. Not only is this bad for public health, it is also bad for workers, families, and businesses.

IWJ was on the front lines fighting for better workplace standards, including paid leave, since 1996, taking the battle to the state and local level, where big changes in workplace standards have often begun.

=== Corporate justice ===
IWJ was active in multiple campaigns targeting well known corporations that have standardized poor working conditions, low pay and stifling collective bargaining rights.

Along with their labor allies, Interfaith Worker Justice worked closely with campaigns such as the Fight for 15 movement for a higher minimum wage and the Making Change at Walmart campaign, which is dedicated to changing the company into a more responsible employer and to improve the lives of Walmart workers.

== Mission and values ==
Interfaith Worker Justice (IWJ) advanced the rights of workers by engaging diverse faith communities into action, from grassroots organizing to shaping policy at the local, state and national levels. We envision a nation where all workers enjoy the rights to:

- Wages, health care, and pensions that allow workers to raise families and retire with dignity.
- Safe working conditions.
- Organize and bargain collectively to improve wages, benefits, and conditions without harassment, intimidation, or retaliation.
- Equal protection under labor law, regardless of immigration status, and an end to the practice of pitting immigrant and US-born workers against one another.
- Fair and just participation in a global economy that promotes the welfare of both domestic and foreign workers.

== Programs ==
=== Celebrate for a Cause ===
As an alternative to asking for gifts, Interfaith Worker Justice offered the opportunity for those celebrating special occasions to request a tribute gift or donation from their friends and family. Interested supporters can create a Cause Wish page which outlines the specific worker justice issue they wish to fund and why, which can then be shared with others.

=== Seminary Summer ===
Interfaith Worker Justice sponsored "Seminary Summer". In the annual program, IWJ places student ministers, priests, rabbis and imams with labor allies so that these emerging religious leaders can participate in worker justice campaigns and learn about labor issues.

=== Labor in the Pulpit/on the Bimah/in the Minbar ===
Interfaith Worker Justice's annual "Labor in the Pulpit/on the Bimah/in the Minbar" program placed pro-union speakers in houses of worship during Labor Day weekend in order to recognize the sacred work of all its members and support low-wage workers' struggles for justice.

=== Worker justice runners ===
Interfaith Worker Justice encouraged all amateur, professional, seasonal and serious runners to join their team of runners who a shared a commitment to protecting and advancing workers' rights. To become a Worker Justice Runner, athletes were asked to donate the funds raised in their next fun run, marathon or triathlon to IWJ.

=== Interfaith resources ===
Interfaith Worker Justice created downloadable resources, free for workers, clergy and worker justice advocates at no cost. The resources are aimed at helping individuals learn, organize and advocate for worker justice across the country.

== See also ==
- Religious socialism
