= Interfaith America =

American non-profit organization

- Formation: 2002
- Founder: Eboo Patel
- Type: Non-profit
- Headquarters: Chicago, Illinois
- President: Eboo Patel
- CEO: Adam Phillips
- Website: www.interfaithamerica.org

Interfaith America (Formerly Interfaith Youth Core) is a Chicago-based non-profit founded in 2002 by Eboo Patel. The organization’s stated mission is to inspire, equip, and connect leaders and institutions to unlock the potential of America’s religious diversity. Today it operates with approximately 60 full-time staff and a budget of at least $15 million. Since 2023, IA has distributed more than $9 million to fund local pluralism and bridge-building projects. Since 2020, Interfaith America (IA) has published more than 2,500 articles on everyday pluralism and interfaith work in its digital magazine.

It has worked on five continents and with over 600 college campuses domestically.

== History ==
Interfaith America (originally called Interfaith Youth Core) officially launched its operations at the 1999 Parliament of the World’s Religions in Cape Town, South Africa, under the direction of Eboo Patel, a Rhodes Scholar and author of Acts of Faith: The Story of an American Muslim, the Struggle for the Soul of a Generation, and organizers Anastasia White and Jeff Pinzino. At the time, Patel was finishing up his doctorate in the sociology of religion at Oxford University, so Pinzino spearheaded much of IFYC’s early organizational growth. Upon completing his doctorate in 2002, Patel took over as executive director. A $35,000 grant from the Ford Foundation enabled IFYC to run its first conference of interfaith leaders and teach a graduate-level course on the methodology of interfaith work.Since then, the organization has coordinated the Chicago Youth Council, a group of eight student interfaith leaders, Days of Interfaith Youth Service, and the Fellows Alliance, a year-long fellowship that trained student interfaith leaders on individual campuses.Patel discuses the genesis of IFYC in-depth in his memoir, Acts of Faith.

=== Rebranding ===
Around 2020, IFYC began to expand its scope by piloting initiatives impacting public health and racial equity through interfaith bridgebuilding. These initiatives included the Faith in the Vaccine Ambassadors program, the Black Interfaith Project,and advocacy for the Building Civic Bridges Act, bipartisan legislation introduced by U.S. Rep. Derek Kilmer (D-Wash.) to establish an office of bridgebuilding within AmeriCorps.

As a result of its work in new fields, the organization officially rebranded as Interfaith America in 2022, expanding its mission from an exclusive focus on higher education to working in broader sectors such as healthcare, workplaces, and civic life.

IA maintains a strong focus on higher education. It hosts an annual Interfaith Leadership Summit, billed as "the largest gathering of college students and educators with a commitment to American civic pluralism," which attracts roughly 500 students and educators each year.

In 2024 and 2025, IA hosted an Advancing Campus Pluralism conference in partnership with the American Association of Colleges and Universities.

== Interfaith Leaders for Social Action ==
In September 2011, IFYC launched recruitment for its Interfaith Leaders for Social Action (ILSA) program.Through partnerships with NGOs in four different cities in India, ILSA trained 50 interfaith leaders, whose work will address social issues like child labor and domestic violence.The program receives support from the United States Department of State’s Bureau of Democracy, Human Rights & Labor—Office of International Religious Freedom.

== Key Milestones and Partnerships ==
- 2011 - Launches recruitment for its Interfaith Leaders for Social Action (ILSA) program.
- 2015 – Begins a partnership with leading researchers that leads to the Interfaith Diversity Experiences and Attitudes Longitudinal Study (IDEALS), the first longitudinal study on religious diversity in higher education.
- 2018 – Publishes Interreligious/Interfaith Studies: Defining a New Field (Beacon Press), shaping academic discourse on interfaith education.
- 2022 – Rebrands to Interfaith America to reflect broader engagement with civic institutions, workplaces, and healthcare systems.
- 2023 - Launches the Team Up project, a nationwide bridgebuilding initiative, in partnership with Habitat for Humanity International, Catholic Charities USA, and YMCA of the USA. (As of 2025, the partnership has awarded nearly $1 million to more than 60 local affiliates for projects that bring communities together.)
- 2024 – Develops the Faith in Elections Playbook in collaboration with Protect Democracy to provide faith-based, civic, and campus communities with practical, nonpartisan resources to engage in U.S. elections.
- 2025 – Interfaith America launches a nationwide ad campaign with the centerpiece being a digital ad on a billboard in New York City’s Times Square.

== Recognition ==
- Eboo Patel has been named to the NonProfit Times Power & Influence Top 50 list three consecutive times, most recently in 2025.
- Interfaith America has received major grants, including $12.5 million from the Stead Family Foundation and $3.2 million from the John Templeton Foundation, to expand interfaith leadership programs. Other major donors include Lilly, Templeton Religious Trust, and Wal-Mart.
- IA has been cited in stories on the future of pluralism in The New Yorker, Inside Higher Education, and The Atlantic as well as in an essay published by The Einhorn Collaborative.
- In 2024, the Obama Foundation selected IA resources for use in Practical Pluralism: A Toolkit for Action, part of the foundation’s Democracy Forum.
