= Private Secretary to the Pope =

Holy See official

Private Secretary to the Pope is an official of the Roman Curia that serves the Pope. The current Private Secretary is Edgard Iván Rimaycuna Inga, appointed by Pope Leo XIV. Since September 2025, he has been supported by Father Marco Billeri as second private secretary.

== List of private secretaries to the Pope ==
Number	Secretary	Pope	Years
1	(Italy) Giovanni Bressani	Pius X	1903–1914
2	(Italy) Attilio Bianchi	Benedict XV	1914–1917
3	(Italy) Carlo Confalonieri	Pius XI	1922–1939
4	(Germany) Robert Leiber, SJ	Pius XII	1939–1958
5	(Italy) Loris Francesco Capovilla	John XXIII	1958–1963
6	(Italy) Pasquale Macchi	Paul VI	1963–1978
7	(Italy) Diego Lorenzi, F.D.P.	John Paul I	1978
8	(Poland) Stanisław Dziwisz	John Paul II	1978–2005
9	(Germany) Georg Gänswein	Benedict XVI	2005–2013
10	(Malta) Alfred Xuereb	Francis	2013–2014
11	(Argentina) Fabián Pedacchio	Francis	2014–2019
12	(Uruguay) Gonzalo Aemilius, S.J.	Francis	2020–2023
13	(Argentina) Daniel Pellizzon	Francis	2023–2025
14	(Argentina) Juan Cruz Villalón	Francis	2020–2025
14	(Peru) Edgard Iván Rimaycuna Inga	Leo XIV	2025–present

== List of second private secretaries to the Pope ==
N.º	Secretary	Pope	Years
1	(Republic of Ireland) John Magee, S.P.S.	Paul VI	1970–1982
1	(Republic of Ireland) John Magee, S.P.S.	John Paul I	1970–1982
1	(Republic of Ireland) John Magee, S.P.S.	John Paul II	1970–1982
2	(Democratic Republic of the Congo) Emery Kabongo Kanundowi	John Paul II	1982–1987
3	(Vietnam) Vincent Trần Ngọc Thụ	John Paul II	1988–1996
4	(Poland) Mieczysław Mokrzycki	John Paul II	1996–2007
4	(Poland) Mieczysław Mokrzycki	Benedict XVI	
5	(Malta) Alfred Xuereb	Benedict XVI	2007–2013
6	(Argentina) Fabián Pedacchio Leaniz	Francis	2013–2014
7	(Egypt) Yoannis Lahzi Gaid	Francis	2014–2020
8	(Italy) Fabio Salerno	Francis	2020–2025
9	(Italy) Marco Billeri	Leo XIV	2025–present
