= Fabián Pedacchio =

Argentine Catholic priest

- Former Personal Secretary to Pope Francis
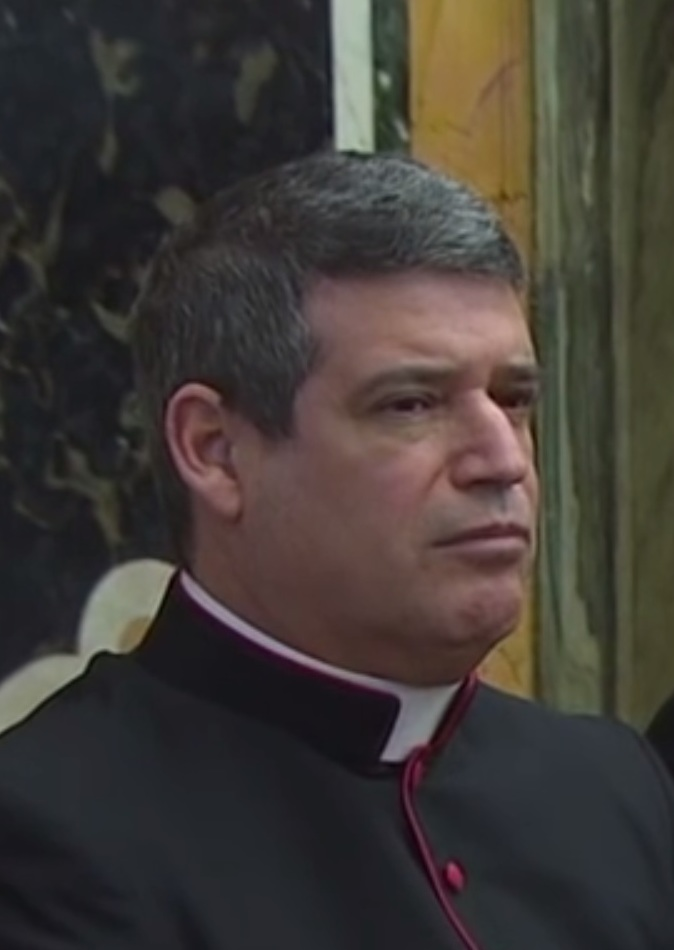
- Fabián Pedacchio in 2016
- Diocese: Rome
- See: Holy See
- Installed: 2013
- Term ended: 2019
- Successor: Gonzalo Aemilius

Orders
- Ordination: 7 December 1992

Personal details
- Born: Fabián Edgardo Marcelo Pedacchio Leániz; 12 April 1964 (age 62) Buenos Aires, Argentina
- Denomination: Catholic Church

Fabián Edgardo Marcelo Pedacchio Leániz known as Fabián Pedacchio (born 12 April 1964) is an Argentine priest of the Catholic Church who served from 2013 to 2019 as a personal secretary of Pope Francis. He works on the staff of the Congregation for Bishops where he worked from 2007 to 2013. Before that, in Argentina, he fulfilled assignments as a parish priest for fifteen years and served on church tribunals at the national level.

== Argentina ==
Fabián Pedacchio was born on 12 April 1964 in Buenos Aires and raised in the barrio of Villa Luro. He studied economics and thought about raising a family before deciding to enter the seminary. He was ordained a priest on 7 December 1992 and through weekly telephone conversations developed a close relationship with his archbishop, Jorge Bergoglio, later Pope Francis. From 1992 to 2007 he held a variety of assignments at six parishes. He also served for several years on two national ecclesiastical tribunals. He is an expert in canon law. He became secretary of SADEC, the Argentinian Society for Canon Law.

== Vatican ==
In 2007, Pope Francis, then Jorge Bergoglio, Archbishop of Buenos Aires, recommended Pedacchio for a position on the staff of the Congregation for Bishops. At the time, Bergoglio's suggested candidates for appointments as bishop were being blocked by the Nuncio to Argentina, Adriano Bernardini. A conservative website reported in December 2011 an anonymous characterization of Pedacchio as "a spy of Cardinal Bergoglio in Rome". On 18 August 2012 Pope Benedict XVI appointed him a chaplain of His Holiness with the title monsignor.

== Pope Francis ==
Shortly after Bergoglio was elected pope in March 2013, Pedacchio moved to the Domus Sanctae Marthae, the Vatican residence where Pope Francis had decided to live. He began collaborating part-time with Pope Francis, while keeping his post of secretary clerk second class at the Congregation for Bishops. He was officially the second secretary to Pope Francis. In June 2013, he told an interviewer: "I want to keep a low profile. I'm doing my best to attend to the Holy Father, without revealing anything of Pope Francis' private life." He became the first secretary in March 2014 when Alfred Xuereb became Secretary General of the Secretariat for the Economy. Yoannis Lahzi Gaid was appointed as the new second secretary.

In November 2019, Vatican press secretary Matteo Bruni announced that Pedacchio is returning soon to the Congregation for Bishops full time. On 26 January 2020, he was succeeded by Uruguayan priest Rev. Gonzalo Aemilius.

== Personal ==
Pedacchio says he dated girls in his youth. He maintained a profile on the social website Badoo. He is an avid supporter of River Plate and likes Gabriel García Márquez's novels and Pedro Almodóvar's films.

Catholic Church titles
Preceded by Alfred Xuereb	Private Secretary to the Pope; 2 March 2014 – 2019	Succeeded by Gonzalo Aemilius
