= Apostolic Palace =

Official residence of the Pope in Vatican City

Apostolic Palace; Palazzo Apostolico (Italian)
- Official residence of the Pope
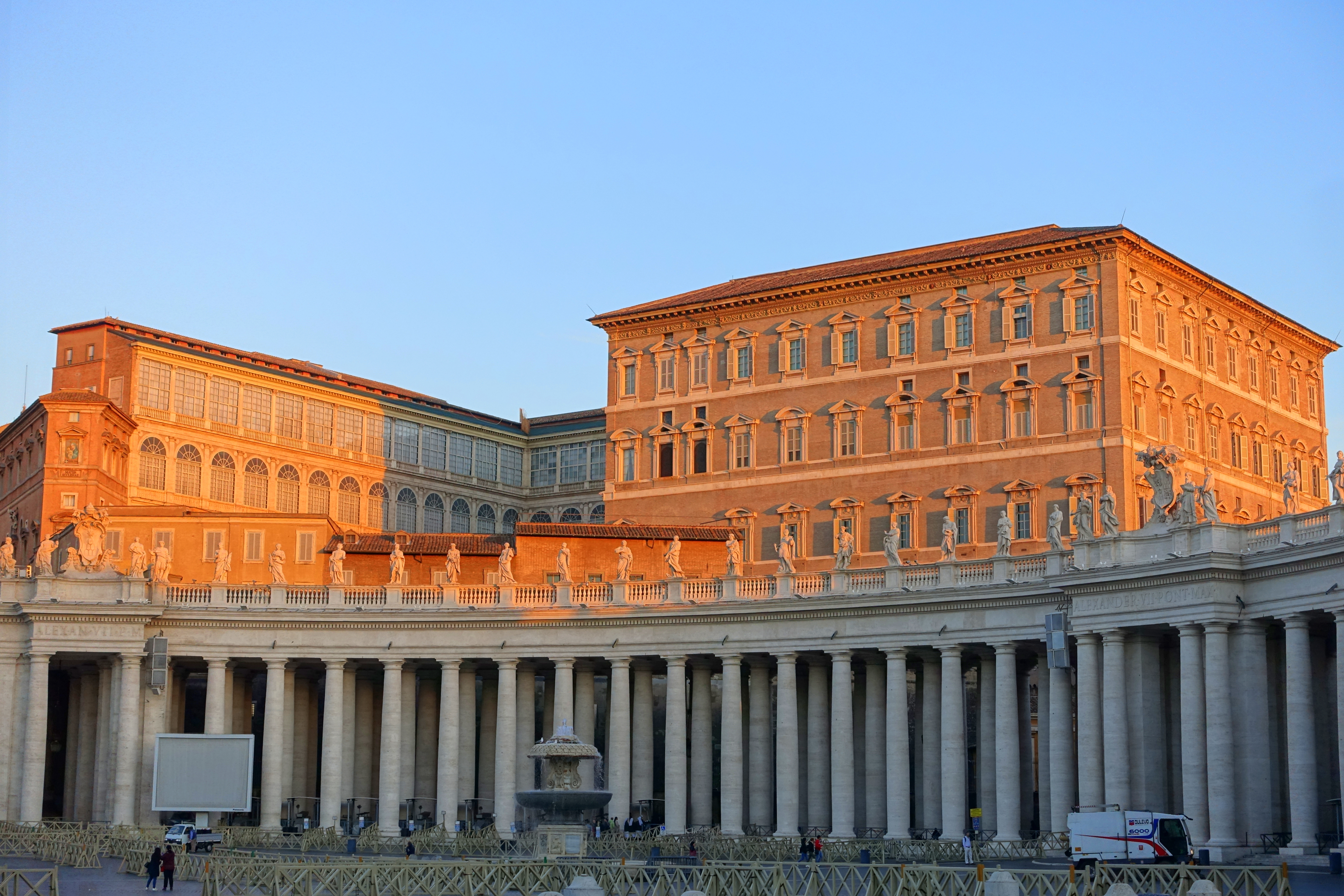
- A view of the palace from Saint Peter's Square

- Location within Vatican City
- Alternative names: Palace of Sixtus V; Palace of the Vatican; Papal Palace

General information
- Type: Official residence
- Location: Vatican City
- Coordinates: 41°54′13″N 12°27′23″E
- Current tenants: Pope Leo XIV
- Construction started: 30 April 1589

The Apostolic Palace (Note: Latin: Palatium Apostolicum; Italian: Palazzo Apostolico) is the official residence of the Pope, the head of the Catholic Church, located in Vatican City. It is also known as the Papal Palace, the Palace of the Vatican and the Vatican Palace. The Vatican itself refers to the building as the Palace of Sixtus V, in honor of Pope Sixtus V, who built most of the present form of the palace.

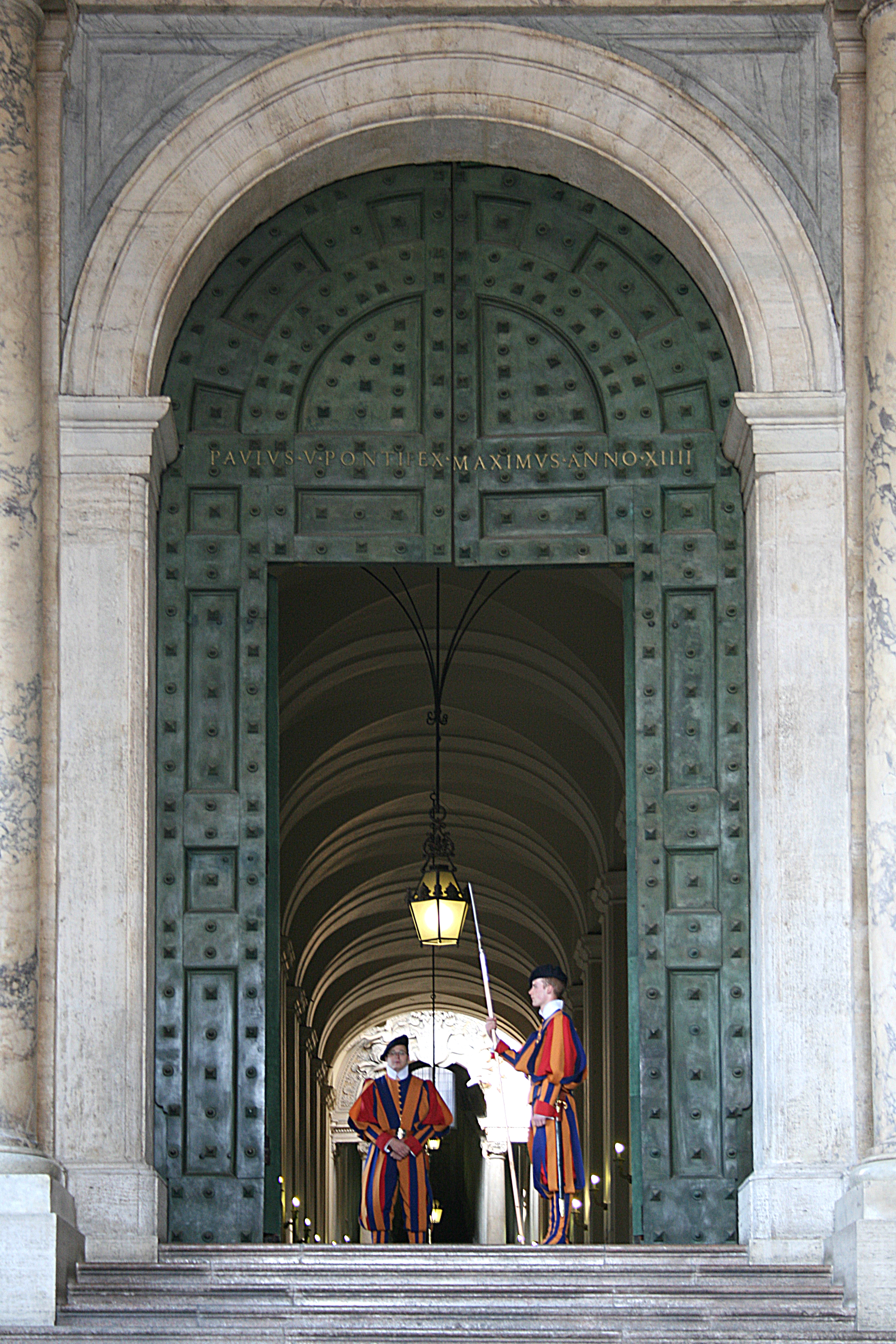
The Portone di Bronzo at the Vatican Apostolic Palace entrance

The building contains the papal apartments, various offices of the Catholic Church and the Holy See, private and public chapels, the Vatican Museums, and the Vatican Library, including the Sistine Chapel, Raphael Rooms, and the Borgia Apartments. Tourists can see this part of the palace, but other parts, such as the Sala Regia (Regal Room) and Cappella Paolina, have long been closed to tourists, though the Sala Regia allowed occasional tourism by 2019. The Scala Regia (Regal Staircase) can be viewed from one end and used to enter the Sala Regia. The Cappella Paolina remains closed to tourists.

== History ==
In the 5th century, Pope Symmachus built a papal palace close to Old St. Peter's Basilica which served as an alternative residence to the Lateran Palace. The construction of a second fortified palace was sponsored by Pope Eugene III and extensively modified under Pope Innocent III in the twelfth century.

Upon returning to Rome in 1377 after the interlude of the Avignon Papacy, which saw Rome subject to civil unrest and the abandonment of several Christian monuments, the popes chose to reside first at Basilica di Santa Maria in Trastevere and then at Basilica di Santa Maria Maggiore. The Vatican Palace had fallen into disrepair from lack of upkeep, and the Lateran Palace underwent two destructive fires, in 1307 and 1361, which resulted in irreparable harm. In 1447, Pope Nicholas V razed the ancient fortified palace of Eugene III to erect a new building, the current Apostolic Palace.

In the 15th century, the palace was placed under the authority of a prefect. This position of apostolic prefecture lasted from the 15th century until the 1800s, when the Papal States fell into economic difficulties. In 1884, when this post was reviewed in light of saving money, Pope Leo XIII created a committee to administer the palace.

The major additions and decorations of the palace are the work of the following popes for 150 years. Construction of the current version of the palace began on 30 April 1589 under Pope Sixtus V and its various intrinsic parts were completed by later successors, Pope Urban VII, Pope Innocent XI and Pope Clement VIII. In the 20th century, Pope Pius XI built a monumental art gallery and museum entrance.

Construction of the Palace took place mainly between 1471 and 1605. Covering 162,000 square metres (1,743,753 square feet), it contains the papal apartments, offices of the Catholic Church and Holy See, chapels, Vatican Library, museums, and art galleries.

== Structure ==
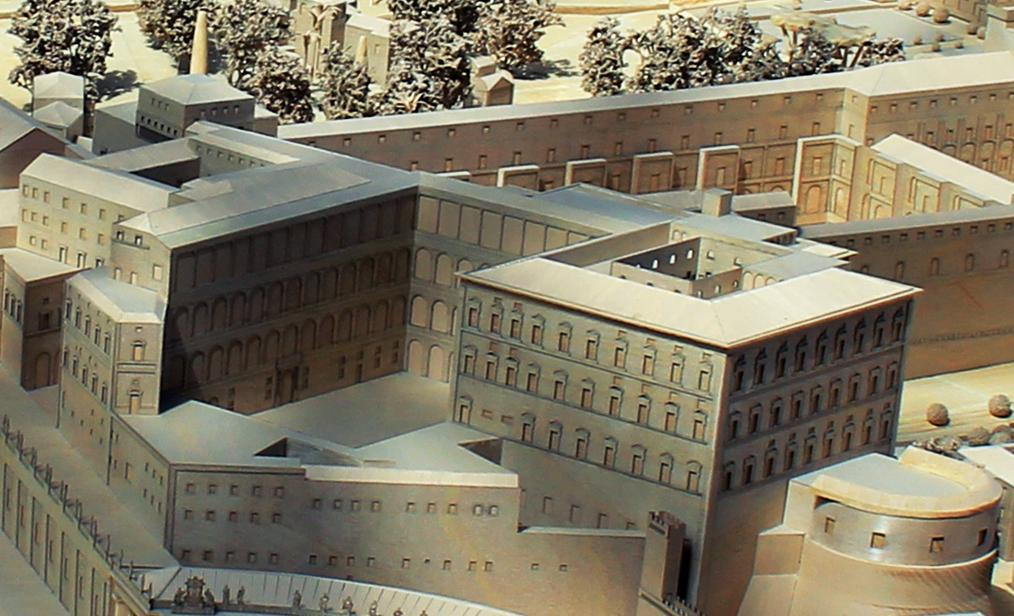
A model of the palace in the Vatican Museums. The buildings are arranged around a central courtyard.

The palace is run by the Prefecture of the Pontifical Household. The palace is more accurately a series of self-contained buildings within the well-recognized outer structure which is arranged around the Courtyard of Sixtus V (Cortile di Sisto V). It is located northeast of St Peter's Basilica and adjacent to the Bastion of Nicholas V and Palace of Gregory XIII.

The palace houses both residential and support offices of various functions as well as administrative offices not focused on the life and functions of the Pope himself.

=== Sistine Chapel ===
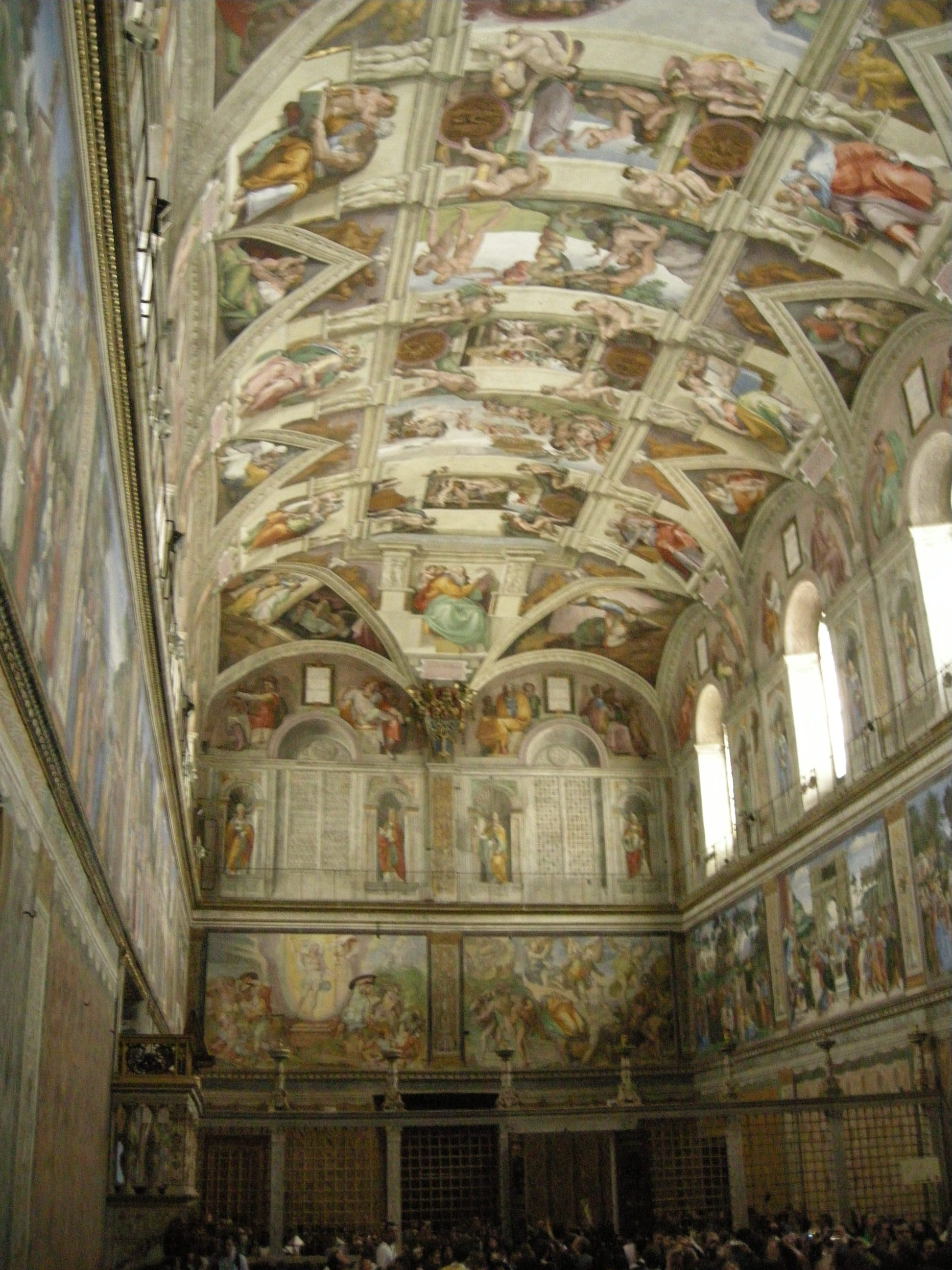
Under the patronage of Julius II, Michelangelo painted the chapel ceiling between 1508 and 1512.

Perhaps the best known of the palace chapels is the Sistine Chapel named in honor of Sixtus IV (Francesco della Rovere). It is famous for its decoration that was frescoed throughout by Renaissance artists including Michelangelo, Sandro Botticelli, Pietro Perugino, Pinturicchio, Domenico Ghirlandaio, and others.

One of the primary functions of the chapel is as a venue for the election of each successive Pope in a conclave of the College of Cardinals. In this closed-door election, the cardinals choose a successor to the apostle and traditional first Pope, Peter, who is (according to tradition) buried in the crypts of nearby St. Peter's Basilica.

=== Raphael Rooms ===
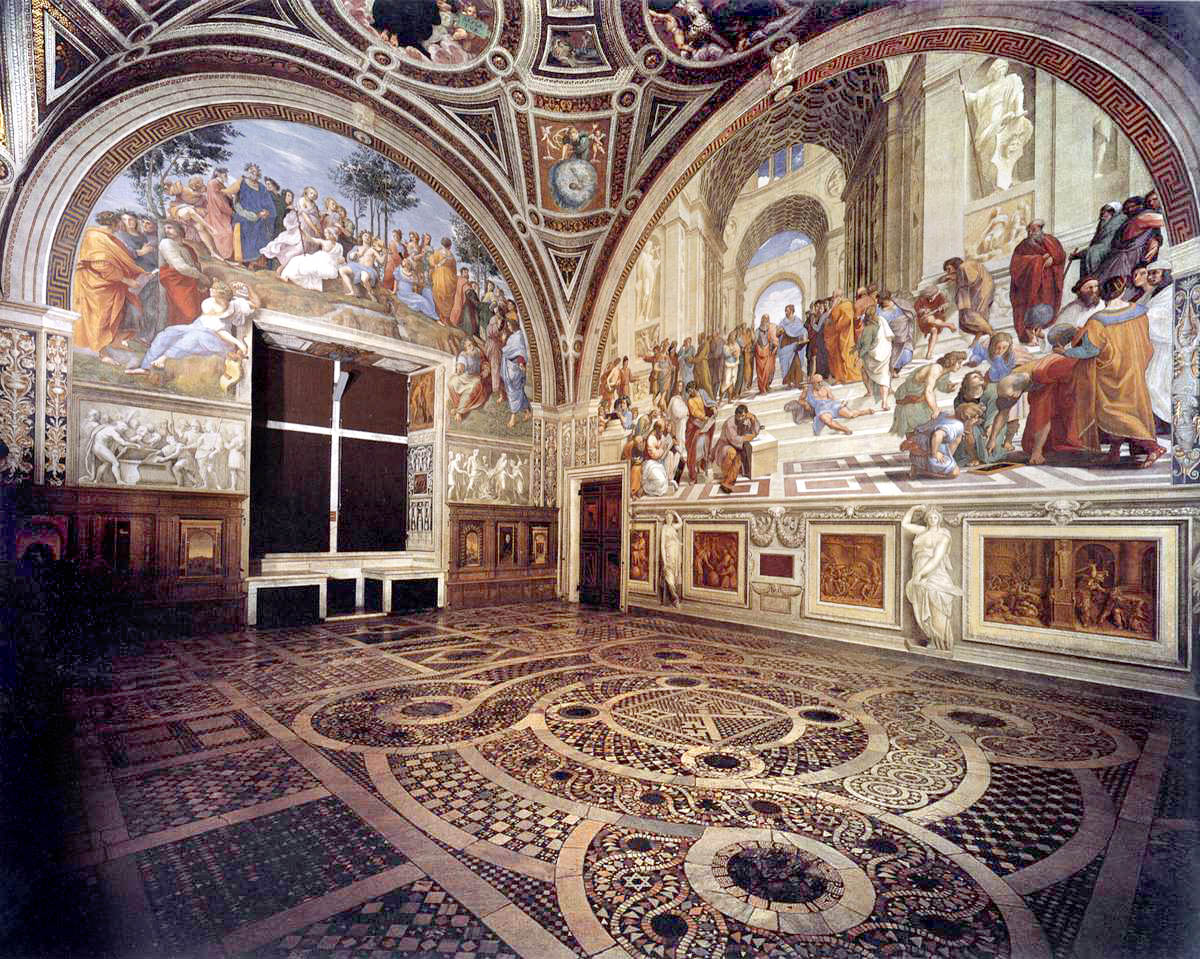
The Stanza della Segnatura

This suite of rooms is famous for its frescos by a large team of artists working under Raphael. They were originally intended as a suite of apartments for Pope Julius II. He commissioned Raphael, then a relatively young artist from Urbino, and his studio in 1508 or 1509 to redecorate the existing interiors of the rooms entirely. It was possibly Julius' intent to outshine the apartments of his predecessor (and rival) Pope Alexander VI, as the Stanze are directly above Alexander's Borgia Apartments. They are on the second floor, overlooking the south side of the Belvedere Courtyard.

From east to west, as a visitor would have entered the apartment, but reversing the sequence in which the Stanze were frescoed, and also the route of the modern visitor, the rooms are the Sala di Constantino ("Hall of Constantine"), the Stanza di Eliodoro ("Room of Heliodorus"), the Stanza della Segnatura (the earliest and the most admired) ("Room of the Signature") and the Stanza dell'Incendio del Borgo ("The Room of the Fire in the Borgo").

After the death of Julius in 1513, with two rooms frescoed, Pope Leo X continued the program. Following Raphael's death in 1520, his assistants Gianfrancesco Penni, Giulio Romano and Raffaellino del Colle finished the project with the frescoes in the Sala di Costantino.

=== Borgia Apartments ===
The Borgia Apartments is a suite of rooms in the palace adapted for personal use by Pope Alexander VI (Rodrigo de Borja). He commissioned the Italian painter Pinturicchio to lavishly decorate the apartments with frescoes.

The paintings and frescoes, which were executed between 1492 and 1494, drew on a complex iconographic program that used themes from medieval encyclopedias, adding an eschatological layer of meaning and celebrating the supposedly divine origins of the Borgias.

The rooms are variously considered a part of the Vatican Library and Vatican Museums. Some of the rooms are now used for the Vatican Collection of Modern Religious Art, inaugurated by Pope Paul VI in 1973. A permanent contemporary art gallery was installed on the premises in November 2021.

=== Papal apartments ===
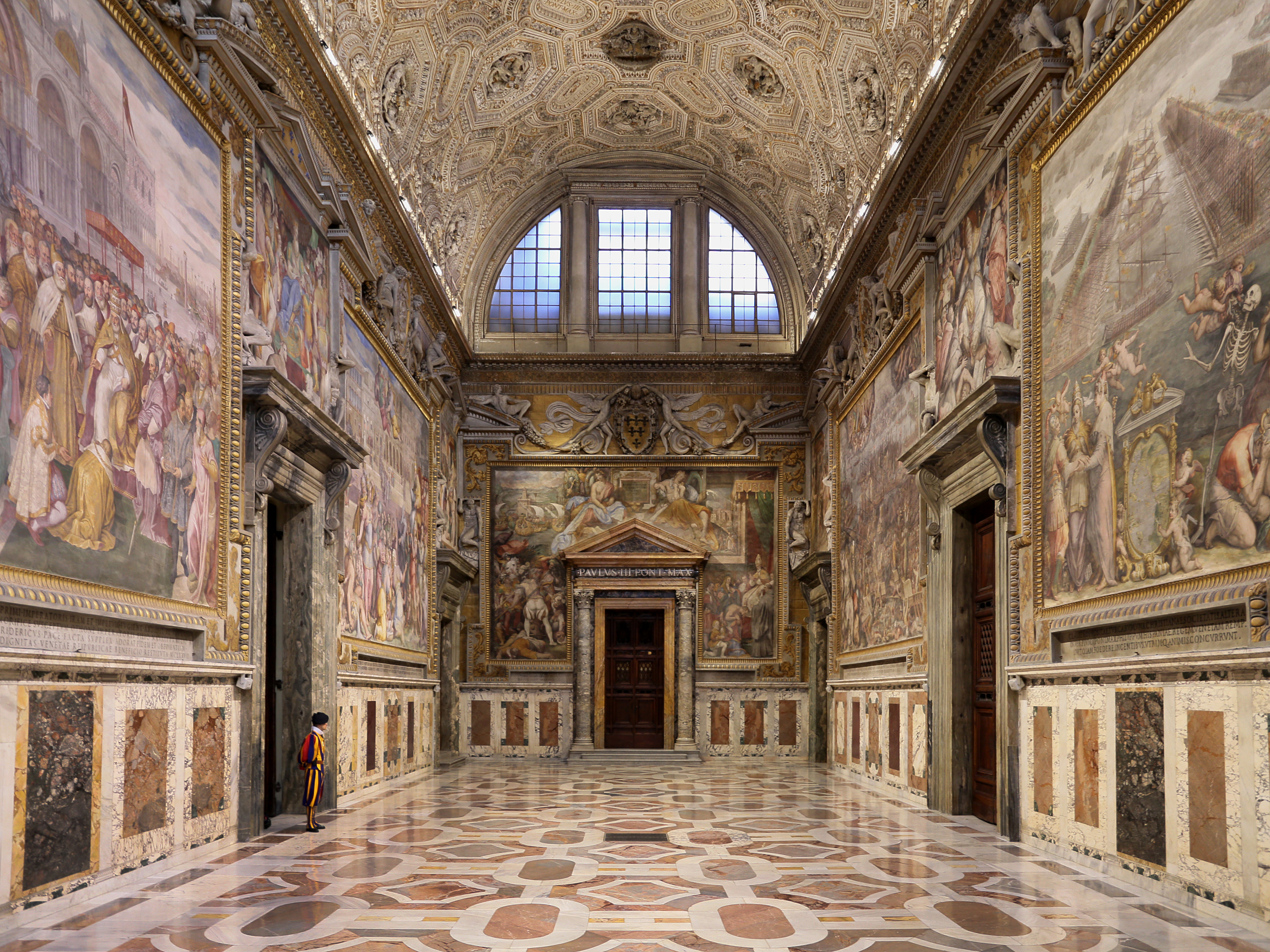
Sala Regia. At the end of the hall is the entrance to the Pauline Chapel.

Since the 17th century, the papal apartments have been the official residence of the pope. They occupy much of the top floor of the Apostolic Palace.

With the exception of Pope Francis, who took up residence in the Domus Sanctae Marthae, all reigning popes have resided in the palace since the move from the Quirinal Palace in 1870. On 14 March 2026, Pope Leo XIV took up residence in the apartments following the completion of renovation works.

=== Clementine Hall ===
The Clementine Hall was established in the 16th century by Pope Clement VIII in honor of Pope Clement I, the third pope. Like other chapels and apartments in the palace, the hall is notable for its large collection of frescos and other art.

=== Loggias ===
The loggias are corridors designed by Donato Bramante and decorated by Raphael with frescoes, which depict 52 biblical events divided into bays in groups of four. They served as inspiration to Italian architect Giacomo Quarenghi while working on the Raphael loggias in the Hermitage Museum.

== Gallery ==
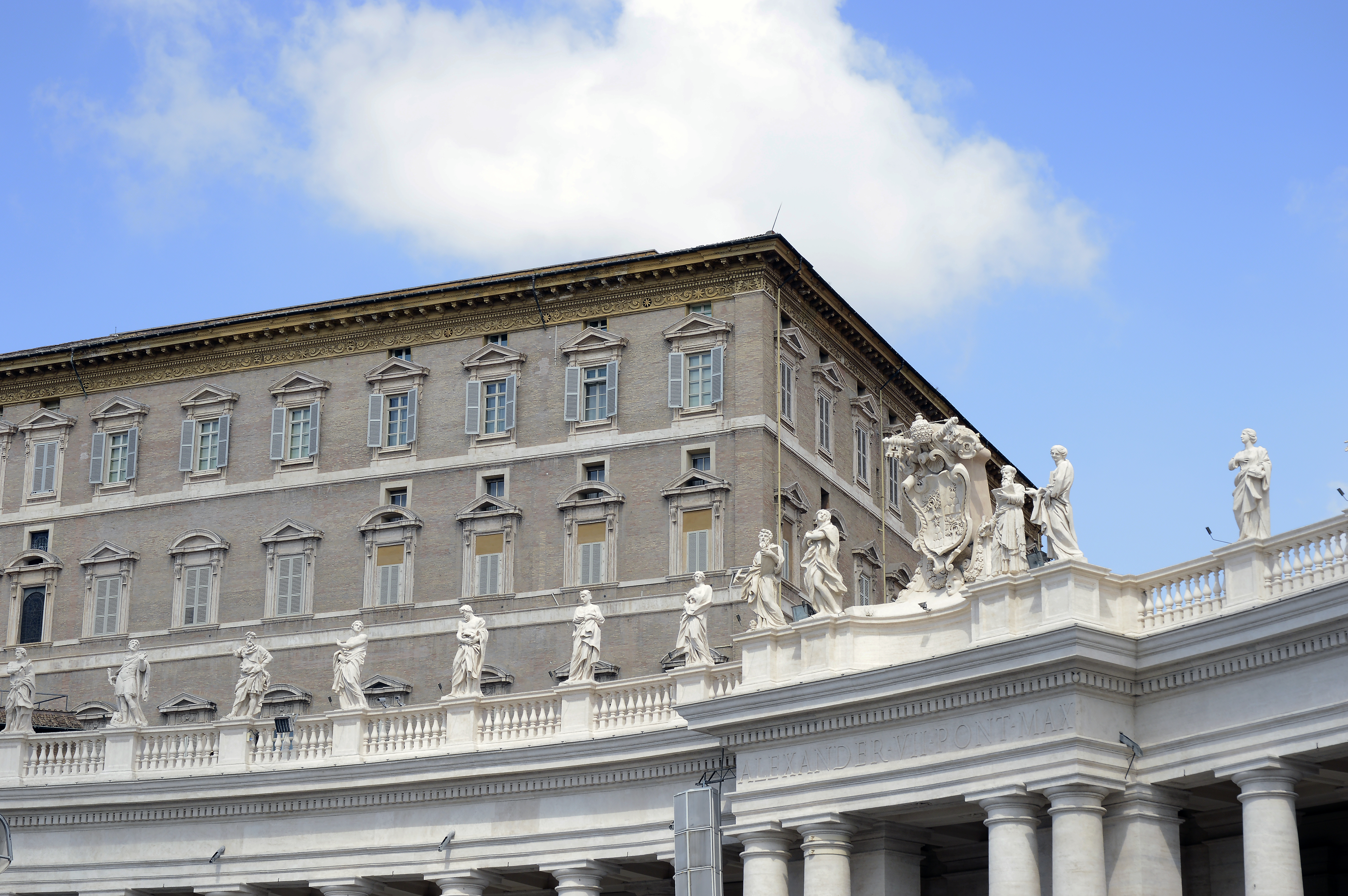
The Papal apartments seen from St. Peter's Square

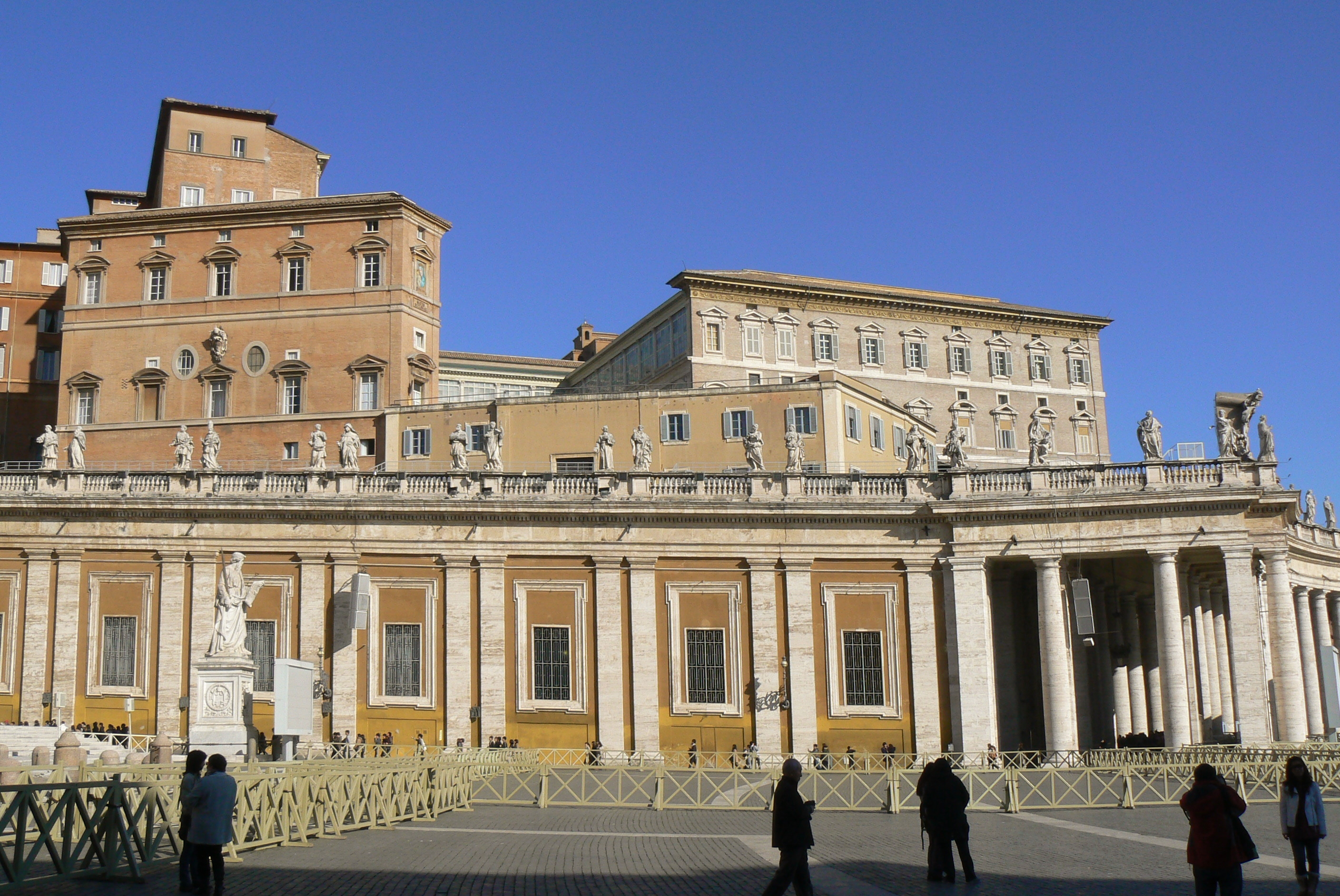
Apostolic Palace from St. Peter's Square

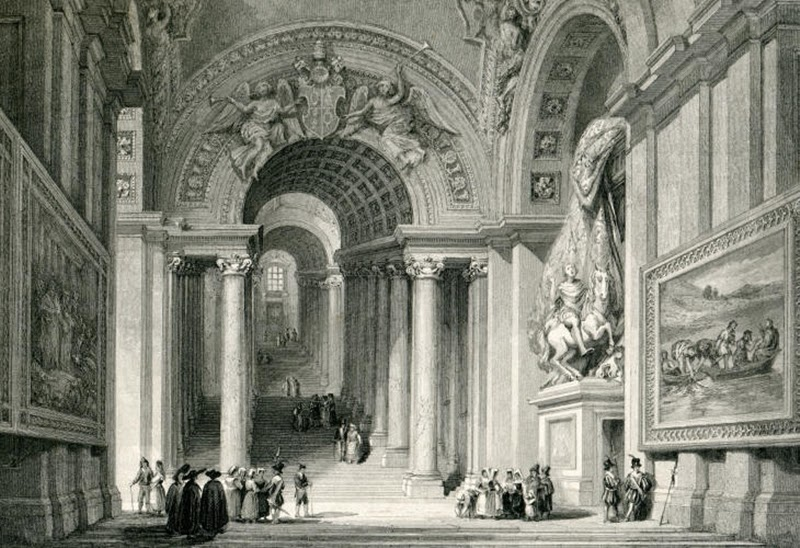
Scala Regia by Gian Lorenzo Bernini

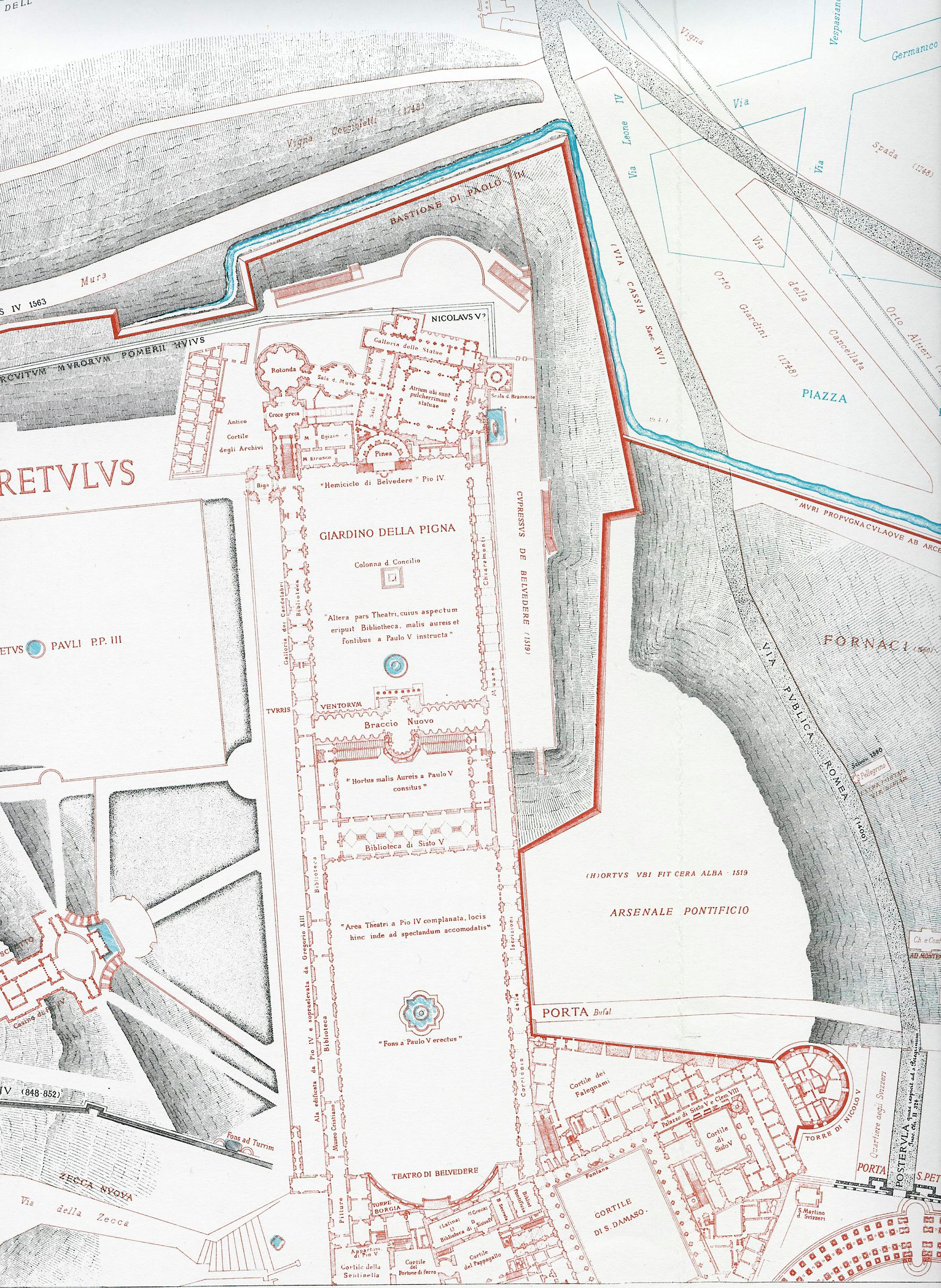
Plan of the Apostolic Palace (1893–1901)

== See also ==
- Domus Sanctae Marthae
- Index of Vatican City-related articles
