= Edgard Rimaycuna =

Peruvian priest (born 1989)

The Reverend Monsignor Edgard Rimaycuna
- Private Secretary to the Pope
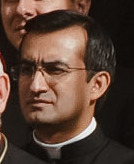
- Fr Rimaycuna in 2025
- Church: Catholic Church
- Diocese: Rome
- See: Holy See
- Appointed: 11 May 2025
- Predecessor: Juan Cruz Villalón

Orders
- Ordination: 22 November 2014 by Jesús Moliné Labarte

Personal details
- Born: Edgard Iván Rimaycuna Inga; 24 September 1989 (age 37) Chiclayo, Lambayeque, Peru
- Denomination: Catholicism
- Education: Pontifical Biblical Institute (SSL)

Edgard Iván Rimaycuna Inga (born 24 September 1989) is a Peruvian Catholic priest and the current private secretary to Pope Leo XIV.

== Biography ==
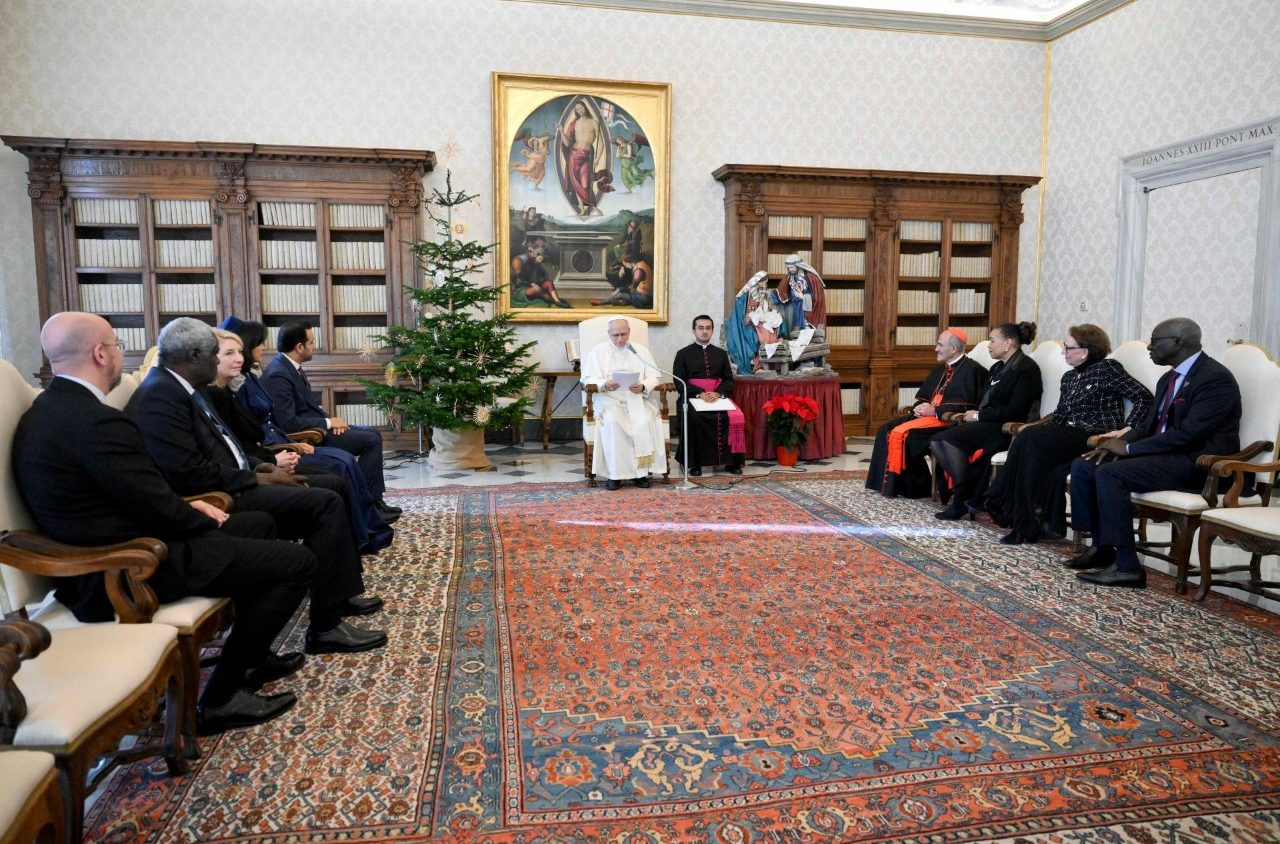
Rimaycuna seated to the right of Pope Leo during an audience in December 2025

Rimaycuna Inga was born on 24 September 1989 in Chiclayo, Peru. He grew up in the La Victoria district of Chiclayo. From 2001, he attended a high school in his hometown (Colegio Nacional San José de Chiclayo). After graduating, he studied philosophy and theology at the Santo Toribio de Mogrovejo seminary in Chiclayo from 2006 to 2013.

During a study visit to Rome in 2006, he first met "Padre Roberto", the Rome-based Prior General of the Augustinian Order (and former Prior of the Peruvian province of the Order), Robert Francis Prevost, the later pope. From 2013 to 2015, Rimaycuna Inga was parochial vicar of Our Lady of Guadalupe Parish in Chiclayo. When Prevost was bishop of the Diocese of Chiclayo from 2015 to 2023, he appointed Rimaycuna Inga as parochial vicar at St. Mary's Cathedral, Chiclayo. In September 2017, he began his studies at the Pontifical Biblical Institute in Rome. After graduating a Licentiate in Scripture in 2021, Rimaycuna Inga went to Manesseno, a district of Sant'Olcese in Liguria, Italy, as parish vicar.

After Prevost moved back to Rome in 2023, as a cardinal of the Roman Curia, he appointed Rimaycuna Inga as his secretary in the Dicastery for Bishops in 2024. Following Prevost's election as Pope Leo XIV on 8 May 2025, Rimaycuna Inga became papal private secretary on 11 May 2025. Papal private secretaries hold a position that is subordinate in protocol, but in practice often quite influential. In December 2025, Rimaycuna Inga was made Chaplain of His Holiness, and therefore granted the title Monsignor, as an expression of his work with the Pope Leo.

Catholic Church titles
Preceded by Juan Cruz Villalón & Daniel Pellizzon	Private Secretary to the Pope; 8 May 2025–present	Incumbent
