= Fabio Salerno =

Italian Roman Catholic priest (born 1979)

The Most Reverend Fabio Salerno
- Second Personal Papal Secretary
- Church: Roman Catholic Church
- Appointed: 1 August 2020
- Term ended: 27 September 2025
- Predecessor: Yoannis Lahzi Gaid
- Successor: Marco Billeri
- Previous post: Secretary of the Apostolic Nunciature to Indonesia (2015-18)

Orders
- Ordination: 19 March 2011 by Antonio Ciliberti

Personal details
- Born: Fabio Salerno; 25 April 1979 (age 47) Catanzaro, Italy
- Residence: Domus Sanctae Marthae
- Education: Pontifical Ecclesiastical Academy; Pontifical Lateran University

Fabio Salerno (born 25 April 1979) is an Italian Roman Catholic priest who served from 2020 to 2025 as the second private secretary to Pope Francis. Prior to this, Salerno had been attached to the apostolic nunciature in Indonesia from 2015 to 2018 while serving in Strasbourg from 2018 until his appointment.

== Life ==
Fabio Salerno was born on 25 April 1979 in Catanzaro. He completed his education in Rome first in the Pontifical Ecclesiastical Academy and then in the Pontifical Lateran University where he earned his doctorate in utroque iure. Archbishop Antonio Ciliberti ordained him to the priesthood on 19 March 2011.

Salerno served as the secretary in the apostolic nunciature in Indonesia from 2015 to 2018 until he served in the Holy See delegation to the Council of Europe from 2018 to 2020. It was following this that he began working in the Section for Relations with States in the Secretariat of State. Pope Francis appointed him on 1 August 2020 to be his second personal secretary to replace Yoannis Lahzi Gaid.

Catholic Church titles
Preceded by Yoannis Lahzi Gaid	Second Personal Papal Secretary; 1 August 2020 – 27 September 2025	Succeeded by Marco Billeri
