= Gonzalo Aemilius =

Uruguayan Roman Catholic cleric

Monsignor Gonzalo Aemilius
- Personal Secretary to Pope Francis
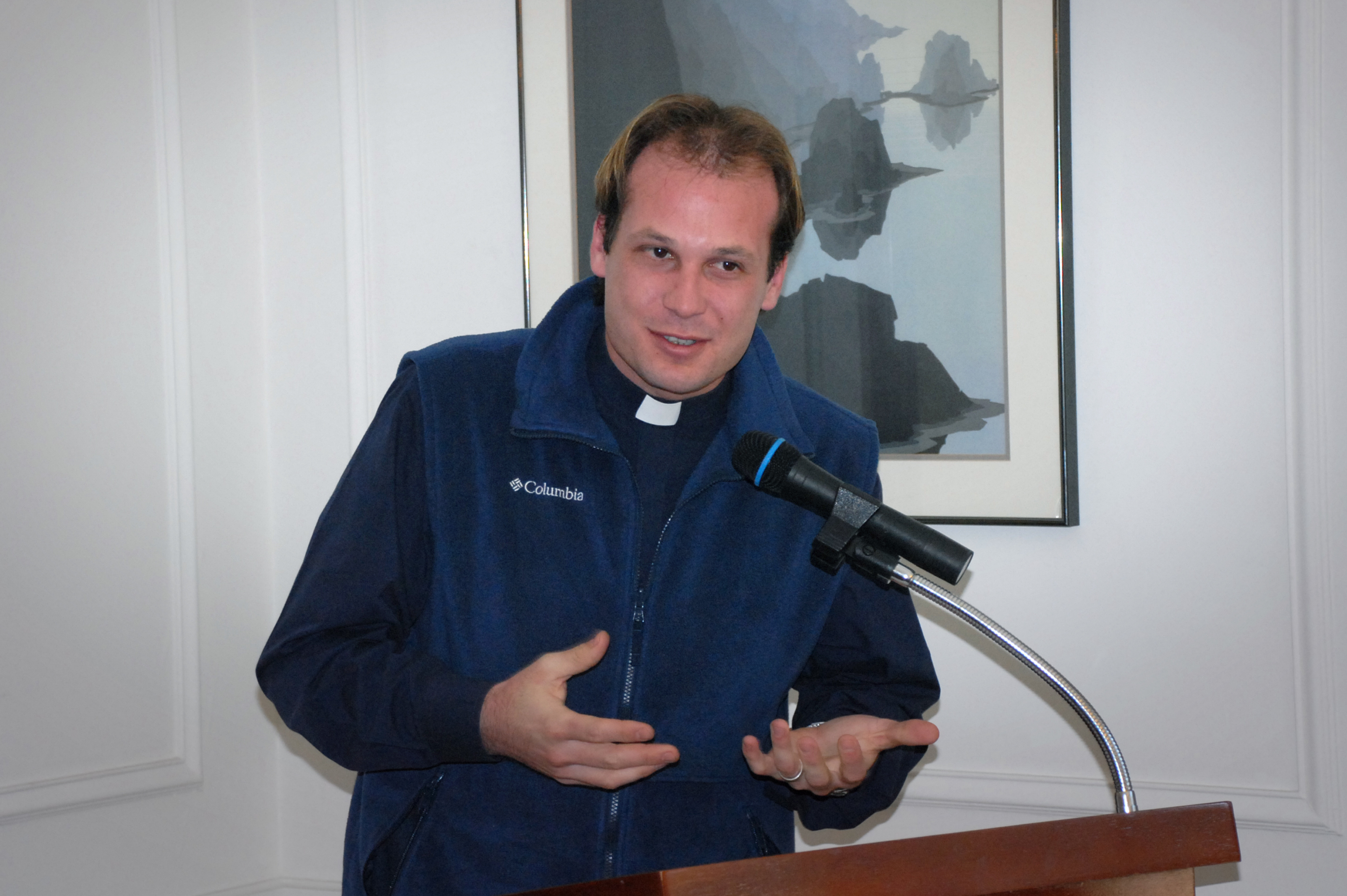
- Diocese: Rome
- See: Holy See
- Installed: 26 January 2020
- Term ended: July 2023
- Predecessor: Fabián Pedacchio
- Successor: Daniel Pellizzon

Orders
- Ordination: 6 May 2006 by Nicolás Cotugno

Personal details
- Born: Gonzalo Aemilius; 18 September 1979 (age 46) Montevideo, Uruguay
- Denomination: Catholic Church

Gonzalo Aemilius (born 18 September 1979 in Montevideo) is a Uruguayan Roman Catholic cleric who served as a personal secretary to Pope Francis from 2020 to 2023. In July 2023, he was replaced by Daniel Pellizzon.

== Biography ==
Gonzalo Aemilius was born in Montevideo on 18 September 1979. His parents were not practicing Christians and one of his grandmothers was Jewish. He grew up in a middle-class family and attended a Catholic school in Montevideo. He was member of the Scout Movement in the Grupo Scout Juan de Córdoba. When he came of age he discovered his vocation for a religious career. He was ordained a priest on 6 May 2006.

He was appointed principal of the Liceo Jubilar Juan Pablo II in 2005; his contribution was vital for the development of this Roman Catholic institution devoted to the education of poor children. While he was working there, Pope Francis, then Archbishop of Buenos Aires, learned of his work and telephoned him periodically to discuss it, beginning in 2006. At the end of 2012 he was sent to the parish of Puntas del Manga to take up a new assignment.

He studied in Rome and earned a doctorate in theology.

On 17 March 2013, as Pope Francis was on his way to celebrating Mass at the Vatican's parish church of Sant'Anna, he recognized Aemilius in the crowd and invited him to attend and after the service introduced him and asked for prayers in support of his work. He told L'Osservatore Romano the next day: "He taught me to take the best that is in each individual, however different he or she may be from others, and to put it to good use for the good of all." Aemilius' family had funded his trip to Rome because they knew of his relationship with Pope Francis. After a few days as a public figure, he returned to his work in Uruguay.

On 26 January 2020, the Vatican announced that Pope Francis had appointed Aemilius to serve as one of his two private secretaries. He replaced Fabian Pedacchio and joined Yoannis Lahzi Gaid in that role.
