= Papal apartments =

Non-official designation for the apartments of the Apostolic Palace in Vatican City

Coordinates: 41°54′13″N 012°27′23″E

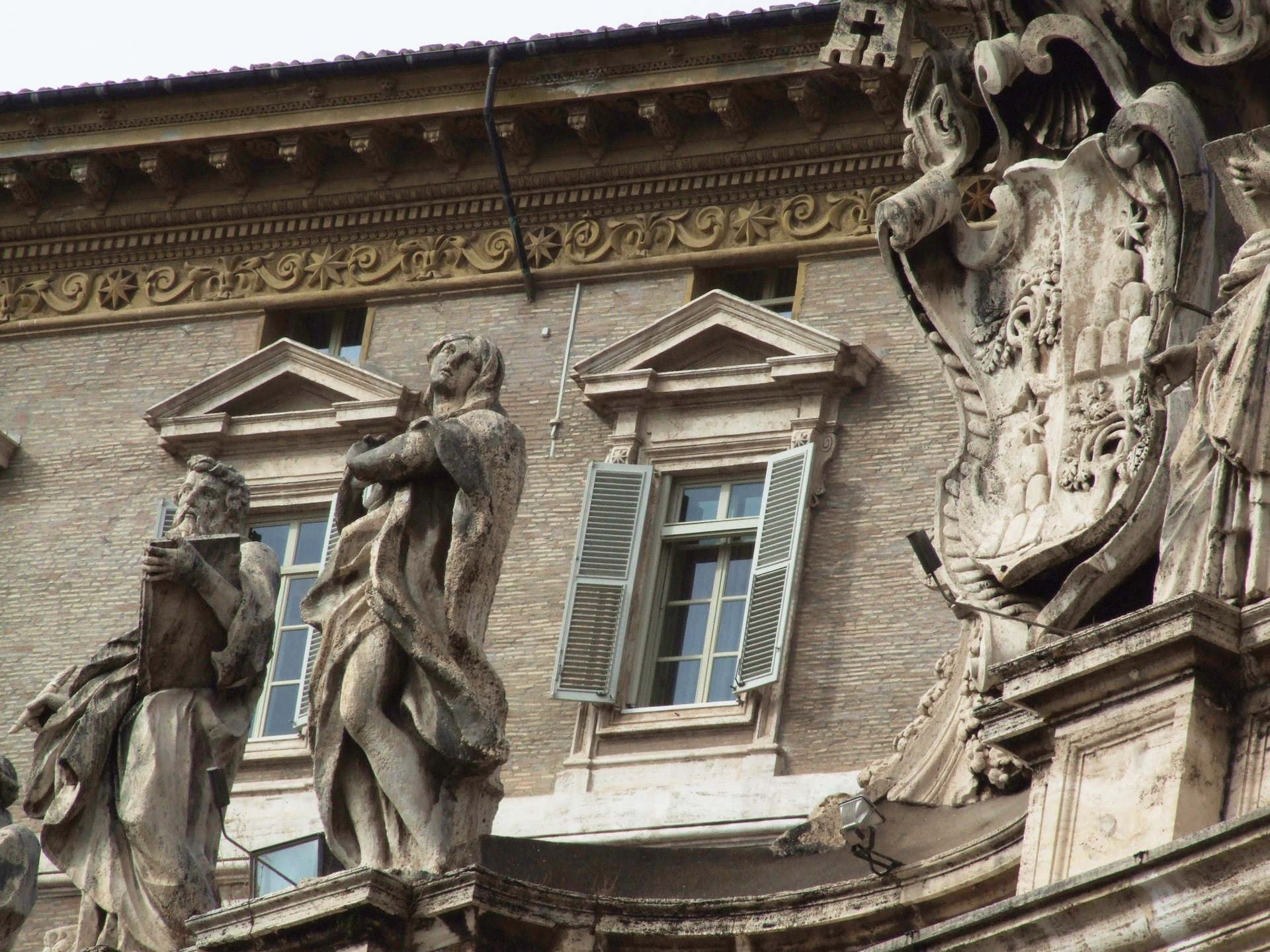
The pope's window, from which he delivers the Angelus

The papal apartments is the non-official designation for the collection of apartments, which are private, state, and religious, that wrap around a courtyard (the Courtyard of Sixtus V, Cortile di Sisto V) on two sides of the third (top) floor of the Apostolic Palace in Vatican City.

Since the 17th century, the papal apartments have been the official residence of the pope in his religious capacity (as supreme pontiff). Prior to 1870, the pope's official residence in his temporal capacity (as sovereign of the Papal States) was the Quirinal Palace, which is now the official residence of the president of the Italian Republic. The papal apartments are referred to in Italian by several terms, including appartamento nobile and appartamento pontificio.

== Facilities ==
The apartments include about ten rooms consisting of a vestibule, a small studio office for the papal secretary, the pope's private study, the pope's bedroom in the corner of the building, a medical suite (which includes dental equipment and equipment for emergency surgery), a dining room, a small living room, and a kitchen. There is a roof garden and staff quarters for the housekeepers. It is from the window of his small study that the pope greets and blesses pilgrims to Saint Peter's Square on Sundays. The private library has been described as a "vast room with two windows overlooking Saint Peter's Square." The pope's private chapel occupies the top storey on the east side of the Cortile di Sisto V.

== Residency ==
The pope usually lives at the papal apartments except for the months of July to September, when the Papal Palace of Castel Gandolfo is the official summer residence.

Vatican News reported that the current Papal Apartments were first used by Pope St. Pius X. Since then, successive Popes, with the exception of Pope Francis, lived at the Papal Apartments. Francis declined to use the Papal Apartments, instead living at Domus Sanctae Marthae; he would continue to appear at the study window for the Angelus/Regina Caeli, and would use the library for receiving guests.

Pope Leo XIV announced he would follow the tradition of many predecessors and take up residence in the papal apartments. On March 14, 2026, the Holy See Press Office confirmed that Pope Leo, together with his closest collaborators, officially moved in to the papal apartments, 10 months after he assumed the Papacy and months of internal and external repairs at the apartments.

Three of the six previous popes, John XXIII, John Paul I, and John Paul II, died in the papal apartments; the fourth, Paul VI, died at Castel Gandolfo; the fifth, Benedict XVI, died at Mater Ecclesiae Monastery, his home after his resignation in 2013; and the sixth, Francis, died at Domus Sanctae Marthae, where he lived throughout his pontificate. The Apostolic Constitution Universi Dominici Gregis prohibits anyone living at the papal apartments during the Vacancy of the Apostolic See (at the death or resignation of the Pope). The Cardinal Camerlengo of the Holy Roman Church is responsible for the sealing of the papal apartments during the sede vacante; the seals will later be broken by the new Pope after his election.

== Renovations ==
The papal apartments are customarily renovated according to each new pope's preferences.

Prior to the renovation in 2005, following the death of Pope John Paul II and the election of Pope Benedict XVI, the papal apartments had reportedly been in disrepair, with "outmoded furnishings and lack of lighting" and large drums placed in the false ceiling to catch water leaks. The 2005 renovation, carried out over three months while Benedict was in summer residence at Castel Gandolfo, included the building of a new library to accommodate Benedict's 20,000 books (placed in exactly the same order as in his previous residence), upgrading the electrical wiring (125-volt electrical outlets, phased out in Italy years prior, were replaced with 220-volt outlets) and plumbing (new pipes were installed to replace those "encrusted with rust and lime"). The heating system was repaired and the kitchen was refurbished, reportedly with new ovens, ranges, and other appliances donated by a German company. The floors, which are 16th-century marble slabs and inlay, were restored. The medical studio ("hastily installed in the papal lodgings for the ailing John Paul II") was renovated and expanded to include dental facilities, and the papal bedroom was completely redone. Wallpaper and other furnishings were put in throughout. The project was carried out by over 200 architects, engineers, and workers. Benedict also moved personal possessions to the papal apartments, including an upright piano.

The latest renovations occurred from 2025–2026, ten months after the election of Pope Leo XIV, who remained at the Palace of the Holy Office (where he also lived as Prefect of the Dicastery for Bishops) after his election until the renovations were completed. The renovations reportedly included modernization of the bathroom and fixing dampness in the walls. During the renovations, cranes were seen working outside the papal apartments.

== See also ==
- Index of Vatican City-related articles
