= Loris Francesco Capovilla =

Italian Roman Catholic prelate and cardinal (1915–2016)

His Eminence Loris Francesco Capovilla
- Cardinal-Priest of Santa Maria in Trastevere
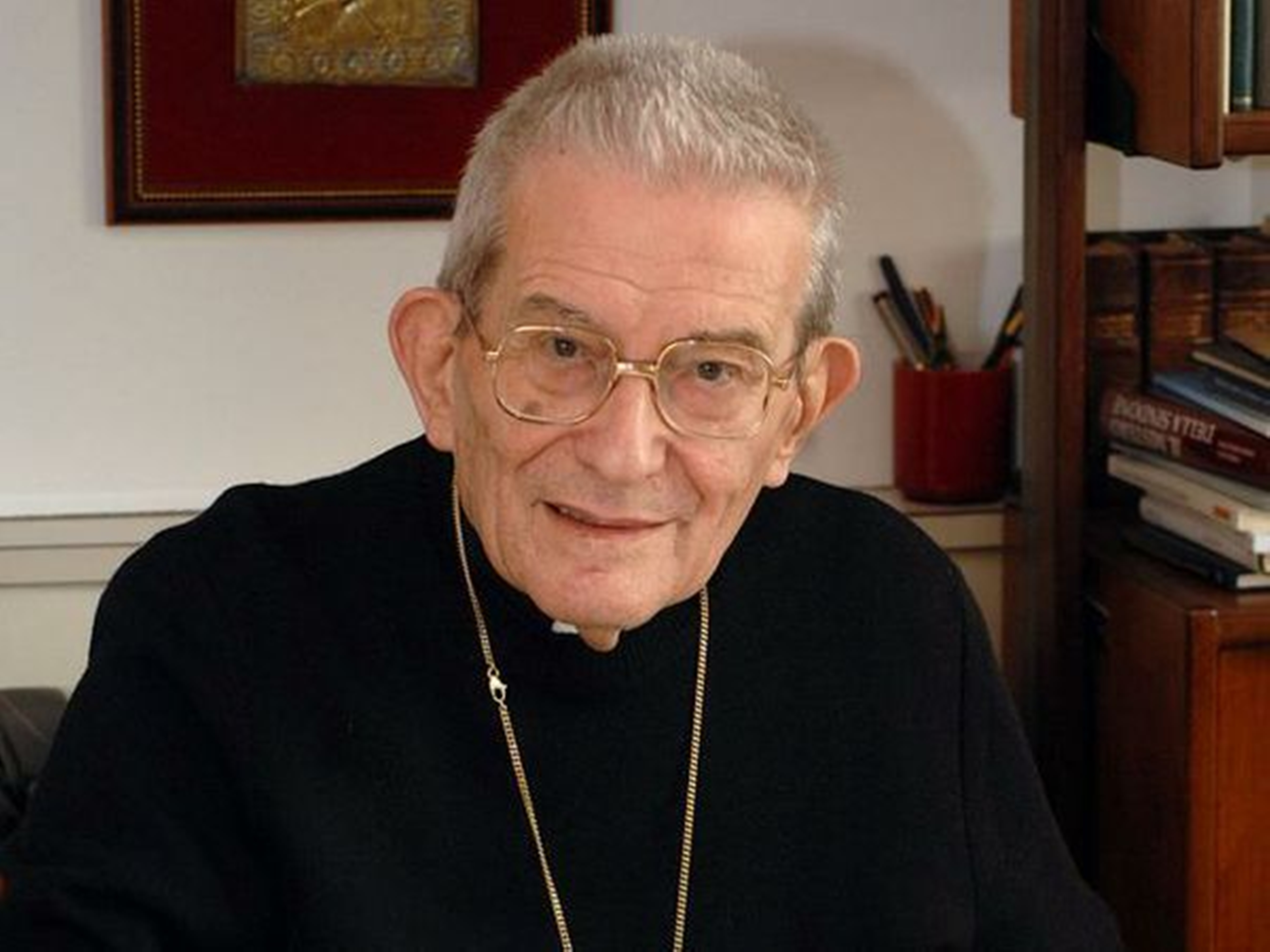
- Loris Francesco Capovilla in 2014
- Church: Roman Catholic Church
- In office: 22 February 2014 – 26 May 2016
- Predecessor: Józef Glemp
- Successor: Carlos Osoro Sierra
- Previous posts: Archbishop of Chieti (1967–1971); Apostolic Administrator of Vasto (1967–1971); Prelate of Loreto (1971–1988); Titular Archbishop of Mesembria (1971–2014)

Orders
- Ordination: 23 May 1940 by Adeodato Giovanni Piazza
- Consecration: 16 July 1967 by Pope Paul VI
- Created cardinal: 22 February 2014 by Pope Francis
- Rank: Cardinal-Priest

Personal details
- Born: 14 October 1915 Pontelongo, Veneto, Kingdom of Italy
- Died: 26 May 2016 (aged 100) Bergamo, Lombardy, Italy
- Motto: Oboedientia et Pax (Obedience and Peace)
- Coat of arms: Loris Francesco Capovilla's coat of arms

Ordination history of Loris Francesco Capovilla
History
Priestly ordination
- Ordained by: Adeodato Giovanni Piazza
Episcopal consecration
- Principal consecrator: Pope Paul VI
- Co-consecrators: Augusto Gianfranceschi (Cesena); Jacques-Paul Martin (Neapoilis in Palastina)
Cardinalate
- Elevated by: Pope Francis

Styles of Loris Francesco Capovilla
- Reference style: His Eminence
- Spoken style: Your Eminence
- Religious style: Cardinal
- Informal style: Cardinal

Loris Francesco Capovilla (14 October 1915 – 26 May 2016) was an Italian Roman Catholic prelate and a cardinal. At his death, he was the oldest living Roman Catholic bishop from Italy and the fourth oldest in the world. At the time of his elevation to the rank of cardinal in 2014, he was the oldest member of the College of Cardinals.

He served as the personal secretary to Pope John XXIII from 1958 to 1963.

== Biography ==
=== Early life and priesthood ===
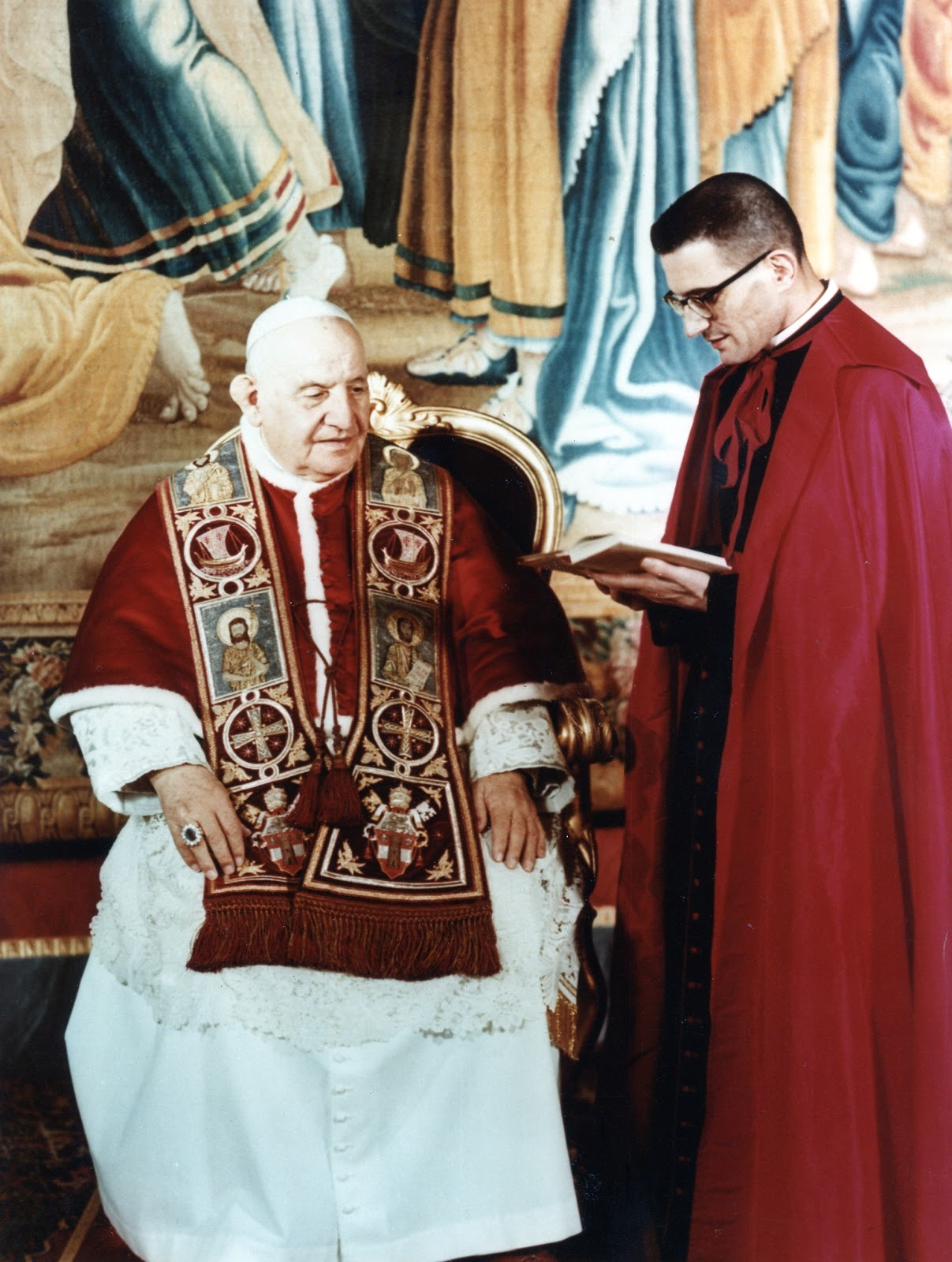
Capovilla with Pope John XXIII.

Capovilla was born in Pontelongo in 1915 as the son of Rodolfo Capovilla and Letizia Callegaro. He had one sister, Lia. He was baptized in Pontelongo. His father later died in 1922 and this in turn led Capovilla to move to Mestre in 1929 following a period of precariousness and wandering.

Capovilla studied at the Patriarchal Seminary of Venice and was later ordained a priest of the Archdiocese of Venice on 23 May 1940 by Cardinal Piazza, the Patriarch of Venice. He was made the capitular master of ceremonies in the Basilica of Saint Mark and also served as a catechist in middle schools. During World War II, Capovilla served in the Regia Aeronautica as a chaplain and later went on to become a Sunday preacher at Radio Venezia from 1945 to 1953. He was also made the director of the diocesan weekly La Voce di San Marco in 1949.

He formed a close friendship with Cardinal Angelo Giuseppe Roncalli (later Pope John XXIII) when the cardinal was the Patriarch of Venice. He commenced his service under Roncalli on 15 March 1953. He claimed, however, to have never called himself Roncalli's friend, but considered him his bishop, his father and his patriarch. He remained at Roncalli's side as papal secretary after Roncalli's election to the papacy in 1958 until his death in 1963.

Capovilla served as Roncalli's conclavist at the conclave of 1958 that saw the latter's election. He was confirmed as the new pope's secretary on the night of the election and was made a Domestic Prelate of His Holiness on 12 December 1958. After the death of John XXIII in 1963, Pope Paul VI appointed him as a prelate di anticamera and expert to the Second Vatican Council.

=== Episcopate and cardinalate ===
Capovilla was appointed bishop of the Archdiocese of Chieti-Vasto on 26 June 1967 and consecrated on 16 July 1967 by Pope Paul VI. The co-consecrators were Augusto Gianfranceshi and Jacques-Paul Martin. He chose as his motto the one used by Pope John XXIII. On 23 September 1971 he was appointed prelate to the Loreto Prelature and the Titular archbishop of Mesembria. His resignation from his position in Loreto was accepted on 10 December 1988.

On 12 January 2014 Pope Francis announced that Capovilla would be elevated to the College of Cardinals on 22 February 2014. Capovilla said it was a "sign of attention to all those thousands of priests around the world who have spent their lives in silence, in poverty, in obedience, happy to serve God and our humble people, who need, as Pope Francis continually says, tenderness, friendship, respect and love."

Capovilla received a dispensation and did not attend the consistory where he was named cardinal. He said: "I'm not strong enough and I feel uncomfortable at the thought of meeting so many people." He was named Cardinal-Priest of Santa Maria in Trastevere. Cardinal Angelo Sodano, the Dean of the College of Cardinals, bestowed the biretta and cardinal's ring upon Capovilla on 1 March.

He died in Bergamo on 26 May 2016. For his entire cardinalate, he was the oldest living Cardinal.

In 1964, he published a memoir, The Heart and Mind of John XXIII: His Secretary's Intimate Recollection (published by Hawthorn Books). As of 2013, he resided in Sotto il Monte Giovanni XXIII, about 25 miles (40 km) northeast of Milan.

== See also ==
- Cardinals created by Francis

Catholic Church titles
Preceded by Robert Leiber	Personal Papal Secretary; 1958–1963	Succeeded by Pasquale Macchi
Preceded by Giovanni Batista Bosio	Archbishop of Chieti; 1967–1971	Succeeded by Vincenzo Fagiolo
Preceded by Aurelio Sabattani	Prelate of Loreto; 1971–1988	Succeeded by Pasquale Macchi
Preceded by Jozef Glemp	Cardinal Priest of Santa Maria in Trastevere; 2014–2016	Succeeded by Carlos Osoro Sierra
Records
Preceded by Fiorenzo Angelini	Oldest living cardinal 22 February 2014 – 26 May 2016	Succeeded by José de Jesús Pimiento Rodríguez
