= Pasquale Macchi =

Catholic archbishop (1923–2006)

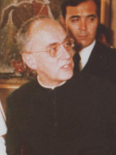
Pasquale Macci in 1977

Pasquale Macchi (9 November 1923 – 5 April 2006) was a Catholic archbishop and the private secretary to Pope Paul VI.

Born in Varese, Italy, Pasquale Macchi was ordained to the Catholic priesthood on 15 June 1946. On 10 December 1988, he was appointed to the Roman Catholic Territorial Prelature of Loreto by Pope John Paul II and was consecrated a bishop by Pope John Paul II on 6 January 1989. Archbishop Macchi retired on 7 October 1996.

During the years spent in Rome as Montini's secretary, he was close friends and collaborators with Paul Marcinkus, whose character was diametrically opposed to his own.

Catholic Church titles
Preceded by Loris Capovilla	Personal papal secretary 1963–1978	Succeeded by Diego Lorenzi
