= Yoannis Lahzi Gaid =

Coptic Catholic priest

Monsignor Yoannis Lahzi Gaid
- Second Personal Secretary to Pope Francis
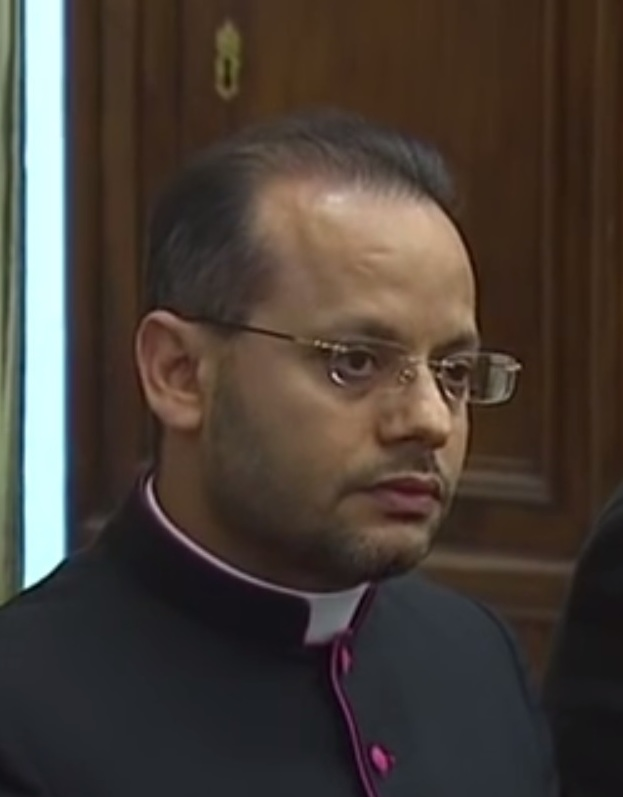
- Yoannis Lahzi Gaid in 2016
- Diocese: Rome
- See: Holy See
- Appointed: 17 April 2014
- Term ended: 1 August 2020
- Predecessor: Fabián Pedacchio
- Successor: Fabio Salerno

Personal details
- Born: Yoannis Lahzi Gaid; 5 March 1975 (age 51) Cairo, Egypt
- Denomination: Catholic Church
- Residence: Domus Sanctae Marthae

Yoannis Lahzi Gaid (Arabic: يوأنس لحظي جيد; born 1975) is a Coptic Catholic priest who served as second personal secretary to Pope Francis from April 2014 to 21 April 2025. He is the first Eastern Catholic to hold the position.

== Biography ==
Yoannis Lahzi Gaid was born in Cairo, Egypt, in 1975. He was one of seven siblings, Enjy, Micheal, Sanaa, Suzie, Milad, Gerges, Sameh. He studied at the Coptic Catholic seminary in Cairo. He was ordained priest for Coptic Catholic Patriarchate of Alexandria, Egypt. He studied at the Pontifical Oriental Institute, earning a doctorate in the canon law of the Eastern Churches. He edited a volume of texts from the Code of Canon Law for the Eastern Churches.

He worked for several years as associate pastor of the church of Santa Domitilla in Latina, south of Rome.

He attended the Pontifical Ecclesiastical Academy and in 2007 joined the diplomatic service of the Holy See. His assignments included stints in the Democratic Republic of the Congo and Gabon, and as chargé d'affaires of the Apostolic Nunciatures to Jordan and Iraq. He also served as an Arabic translator for Pope Francis at his general audiences and in meetings with Arabic-speaking diplomats and government officials.

On 1 July 2011, Pope Benedict XVI appointed him a chaplain of His Holiness with the title monsignor.

In April 2014 Pope Francis appointed him as his second personal secretary. He continues to work for the Secretariat of State as well. His appointment was interpreted as gesture of support for Eastern Catholic churches and dialog with the Arab and Muslim world. By the time he took on this position, he was already living in the same residence as Pope Francis, the Domus Sanctae Marthae. In rare public remarks for a papal secretary, he praised the development of dialog with Islam, saying that the meeting of Pope Francis and Ahmad al-Tayyib in Cairo in 2017 "gave proof that we can talk, we can talk, we can also love each other people of different religions. Before there was no dialogue, and therefore there was distance, there was also a bit of hostility towards one another. Now there is deep friendship." After the same two leaders issued their Document on Human Fraternity in February 2019, Lahzi Gaid was named in September as one of the first members of a committee to promote its principles. He was also named a member of its executive board.
