= Robert Leiber =

German Roman Catholic priest (1887–1967)

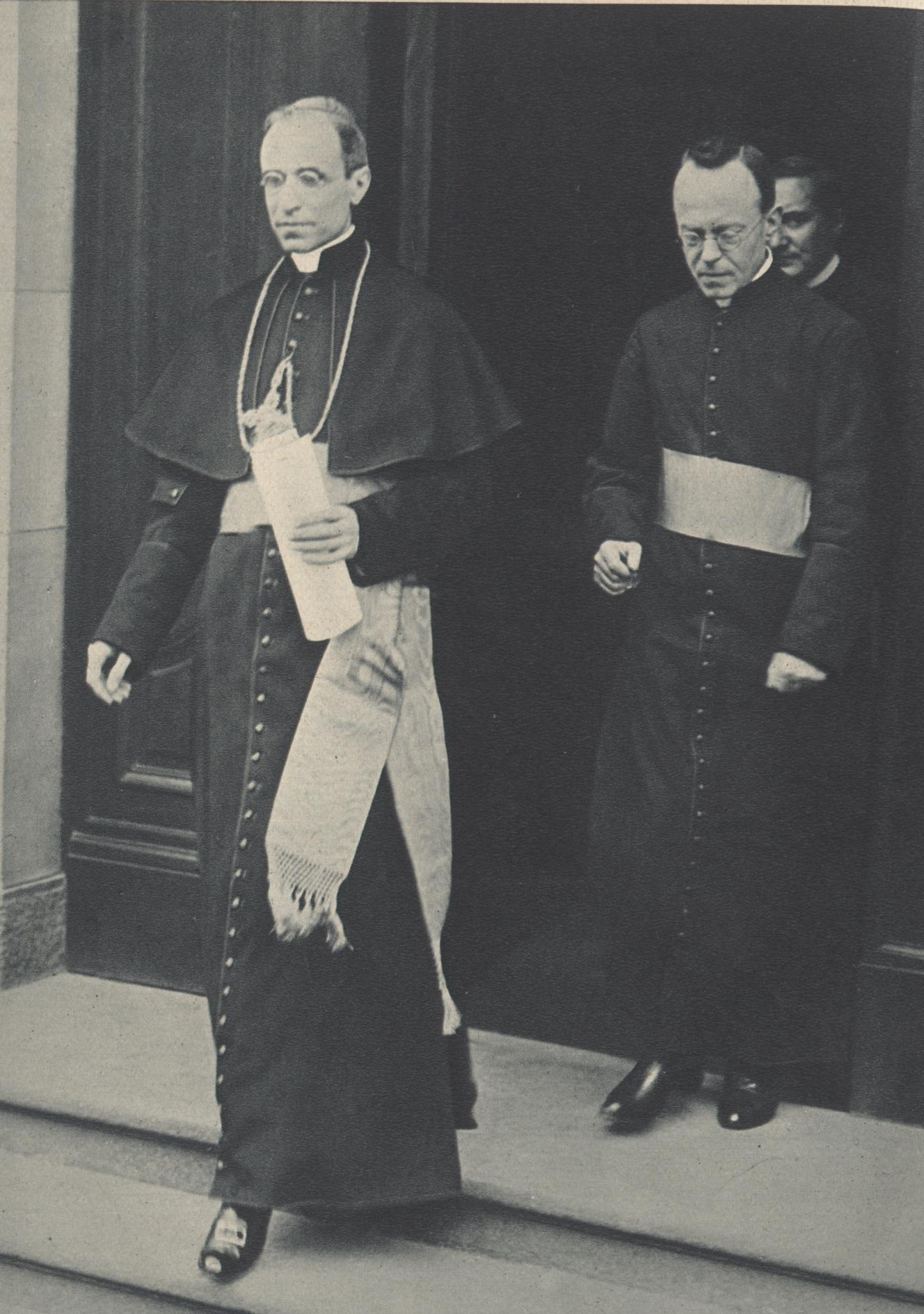
Eugenio Pacelli and Robert Leiber (right), 1929

Robert Leiber, S.J. (10 April 1887 – 18 February 1967) was a Jesuit priest from Germany, Professor for Church History at the Gregorian University in Rome from 1930 to 1960.

Leiber was the private secretary to Pius XII and, according to the pontiff's biographer Susan Zuccotti, was his closest advisor "throughout his entire papacy".

== Biography ==
Before 1924, Leiber worked with Ludwig Pastor on the publication of his 20-volume Papal History. From 1924 to 1929, he was advisor to Eugenio Pacelli while he was Nuncio in Munich and in Berlin. While Professor at the Gregorian, he continued advising Pacelli, who was then Cardinal Secretary of State. After Pacelli was elected to the papacy as Pope Pius XII in 1939, Leiber helped and advised him until the Pope's death on 9 October 1958. Leiber is described as Pius XII's "most trusted aide". However he never was a Vatican official. He was a respected and feared "unofficial official". Known in papal Rome as the "little asthmatic", some described him with a Latin quip: Timeo non Petrum sed secretarium eius - "I do not fear Peter [the Pope], but his secretary".

He assisted Pius XII in researching the topics for his speeches and radio messages. Leiber was one of an "impromptu band of willing Jesuits" whom Pius XII employed "checking and double-checking every reference" in his written works. Leiber, stationed at the Pontifical Gregorian University, three miles from the Vatican, complained after Pius XII's death that he was often expected to "drop whatever he was doing and hasten to the Vatican", taking public transportation.

As the Pope's trusted private secretary, Leiber acted at the intermediary between Pius XII and the German Resistance. He met with Joseph Müller, who visited Rome in 1939 and 1940 to obtain assistance from the Pope in acting as an intermediary between the Resistance and the Allies in the lead-up to a planned coup against Hitler. Later in the war, Leiber remained the point of contact for communications from Colonel-General Ludwig Beck in the lead up to the 1944 July Plot. Through the German ambassador to the Vatican, Ernst von Weizsäcker, Leiber was informed that Nuncio Cesare Orsenigo's priest assistant was secretly a member of the Nazi Party and an informer for the RSHA.

After World War II, Pius XII charged Leiber and Augustin Bea with investigating the activities of Gertrud Luckner (later declared Righteous among the Nations), the pioneer of a German Catholic philo-Semitic and pro-Israel movement. The Holy Office in 1948 issued a monitum (or warning) to the group, due to concerns that the group's pro-Zionist activities were "encouraging religious indifferentism (the belief that one religion is as good as the next)". Leiber concluded in April 1950 there was nothing theologically wrong with the work of Luckner. Bea went further by actually affirming it.

== Last years and death ==
In an October 1958 meeting, Leiber turned down a position offered by new Pope John XXIII in light of his health and suggested Augustin Bea instead. He authored several books and articles on church history and on the Reichskonkordat. After suffering acute asthma attacks for many years, Leiber died in Rome in 1967, aged 79.

== Involvement in ratlines ==
According to Michael Phayer, Leiber "sparked new life" into Austrian Bishop Alois Hudal's plan to set up a "ratline", an escape route from Europe for Nazis and fascists including war criminals. Leiber wrote to Hudal around the time of Operation Barbarossa, telling the latter to "look at the [ratline] mission as a crusade".

According to a history professor at the Pontifical Gregorian University, Leiber had no direct authority to correspond with Hudal but "[his] role as one of Pius XII's closest confidantes allowed the German Jesuit to act as the pope's intermediary and messenger". Hudal maintained contact with Leiber and other Vatican officials during and after the war. Leiber destroyed all his personal papers before his death, rather than leave them for posterity, which confirmed to van Room that he had destroyed his papers because he feared they "would cast Pius in an unfavorable light".

== Statements on Pius XII and the Holocaust ==
After the war, Leiber became actively involved in debates over the legacy of Pius XII during the Holocaust and frequently wrote and spoke publicly, always as a staunch defender of Pius XII. Leiber wrote an article, published on 27 March 1963 in the Frankfurter Allgemeine Zeitung, the main claim of which was that Pius XII had limited and generally-unreliable information about the Holocaust.

As Leiber related to the Dutch historian Ger van Roon, Leiber believed that Pius XII chose not to speak out about the Holocaust because he "wanted to play the peacemaker during the war" by maintaining Vatican neutrality and independence. On this point, Leiber and British diplomat Francis d'Arcy Osborne, another contemporary close to Pius XII, were in agreement. During the war, Pius XII surrounded himself with German advisers including Leiber but also Ludwig Kaas and Pasqualina Lehnert. That attracted the attention of the United States Department of State historian George Kent and others, who questioned the pope's neutrality because of the apparent Germanophilia.

In 1961, Leiber asserted that Pius personally ordered superiors of church properties to open their doors to Jews. If such orders were ever put into writing (which is unlikely, given the situation), no such written order has been found, which prompted some historians to deny the orders. Michael Phayer argues that Catholic institutions in Italy and elsewhere that admitted or helped Jews did so "independently, without the Vatican's instructions". For his statistics on the number of Jews he claimed Pius XII to have saved, Leiber relied on the fellow Jesuit Beato Ambord; the original compilation of the numbers is unknown.

Above all, Leiber disputed that the disbanding of the German Catholic Centre Party had been a quid pro quo for the signing of the Reichskonkordat. Leiber wrote in 1958m "[Pacelli] wished that [the party] could have postponed its dissolution until after the signing of the concordat. The mere fact of its existence, he said, might have been of use at the negotiating state".

== Notes ==
Catholic Church titles
Preceded by Carlo Confalonieri	Personal Papal Secretary; 1939–1958	Succeeded by Loris Francesco Capovilla
