= Domus Sanctae Marthae =

Guest house in Vatican City

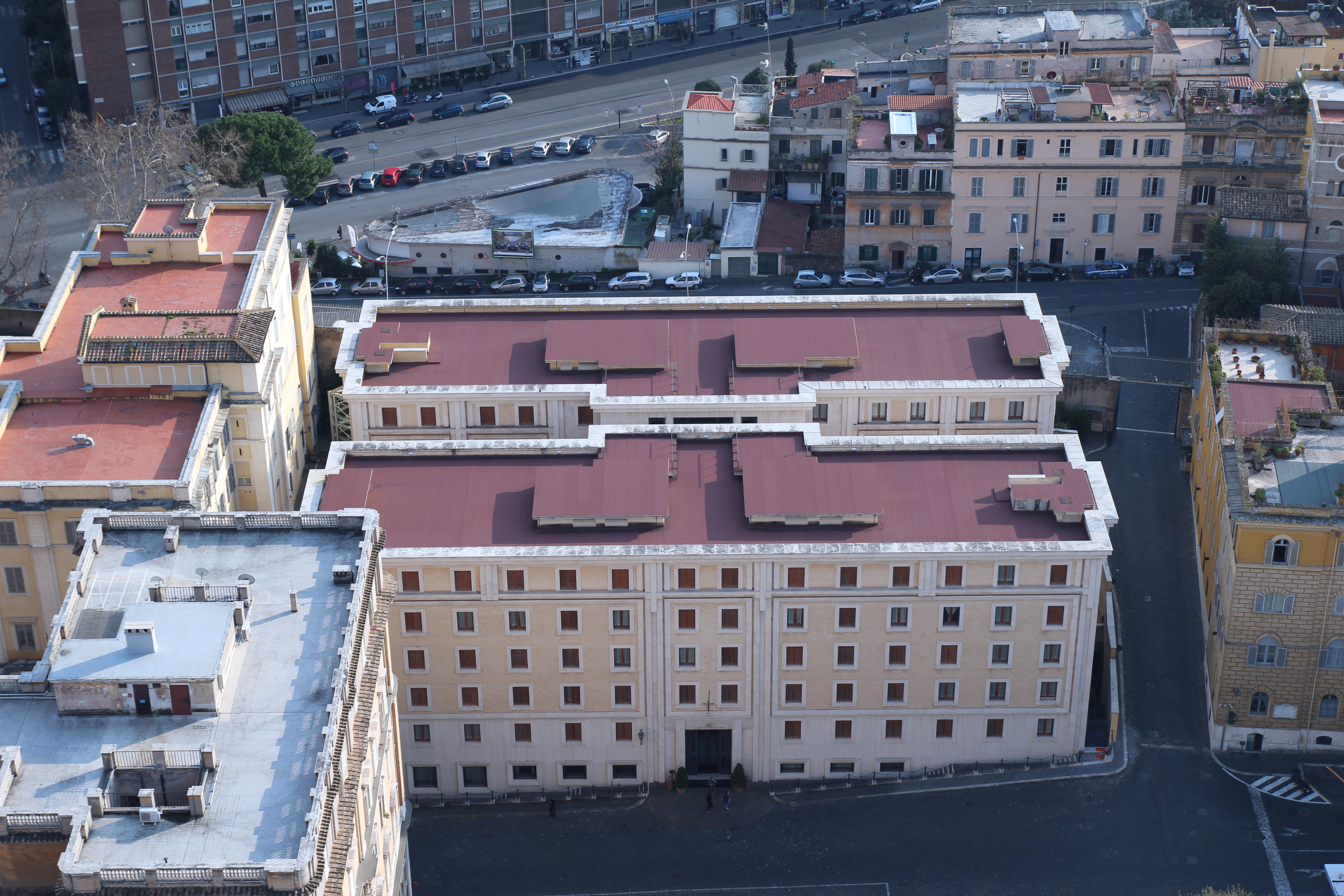
- The Domus Sanctae Marthae seen from the dome of St. Peter's Basilica

- Location within Vatican City

General information
- Type: Residence, guest house
- Architectural style: Modern
- Location: Vatican City
- Coordinates: 41°54′03″N 12°27′12″E
- Completed: 1996 (30 years ago)
- Opened: 1996 (30 years ago)
- Owner: The Holy See

The Domus Sanctae Marthae (Latin for House of Saint Martha; Italian: Casa di Santa Marta) is a building adjacent to St. Peter's Basilica in Vatican City. Completed in 1996, during the pontificate of Pope John Paul II, it is named after Martha of Bethany, who was a sibling to Mary and Lazarus of Bethany. The building functions as a guest house for clergy having business with the Holy See and as the temporary residence of members of the College of Cardinals while participating in a papal conclave to elect a new pope.

Pope Francis lived in a suite in the Domus Sanctae Marthae from his election in 2013 to his death in 2025, declining to live in the papal apartments in the Apostolic Palace.

== Building and facilities ==
Prior to the construction of Domus Sanctae Marthae, cardinals participating in conclaves lived in uncomfortable makeshift rooms in the Apostolic Palace, which had limited bathroom and dining facilities and no air conditioning, which was difficult for older cardinals.

Pope John Paul II, after participating in two conclaves, decided to make the process more comfortable and less strenuous on the elderly cardinals, and commissioned the construction of Domus Sanctæ Marthæ. He specified it would serve for conclaves and at other times be available to "ecclesiastical personnel serving at the Secretariat of State and, as far as possible, at other Dicasteries of the Roman Curia, as well as to cardinals and bishops visiting Vatican City to see the Pope or to participate in events and meetings organized by the Holy See". Laymen have stayed there as well.

Italian environmental groups, joined by Italian politicians, protested against the construction because it would block the view of St. Peter's Basilica enjoyed from some nearby apartments. The head of the Vatican's Department of Technical Services contended that it would be lower in height than many neighborhood buildings and rejected challenges to the Vatican's right to build within its borders.

The hotel cost $20 million, with $13 million initially pledged by casino owner John E. Connelly, from Pittsburgh, Pennsylvania, who later received a contract to sell copies of Vatican art in the United States. Connelly did not fulfil his initial financial commitment after his business encountered financial setbacks. His art contract was also rescinded after he failed to extend his marketing efforts beyond Pittsburgh.

Connelly proposed Louis D. Astorino, a Pittsburgh-based architect, to design the building. When his design was rejected, Astorino remained to design the adjacent Chapel of the Holy Spirit while the Italian architect Giuseppe Facchini, former deputy director of the technical services of the governorate of the Vatican, designed the new building. The chapel occupies a site between the Leonine Wall and the guesthouse proper.

The five-story building has 106 suites, 22 single rooms and one apartment. It is run by the Daughters of Charity of Saint Vincent de Paul. Its amenities include furnished bedrooms, lavatories, and studies for each occupant. Dining facilities and personal services are offered. Mary Ann Glendon, U.S. Ambassador to the Holy See from 2008 to 2009, described the accommodations as "comfortable, but by no means deluxe".

== Previous structure ==
In 1891, Pope Leo XIII had the St. Martha Hospice built on the site now occupied by the Domus, when it was feared that the cholera epidemic of that time might reach Rome. After it did not, the building was used to provide services to the sick of Rome's Borgo and Trastevere neighborhoods, and as a hospice for pilgrims. Electricity was provided in 1901, and a chapel added in 1902. Medical services were expanded to cover priests and Swiss Guards.

During World War II the building was used by refugees, Jews, and ambassadors from countries that had severed diplomatic relations with Italy. At the end of the war, Pope Pius XII greeted 800 Roman children who breakfasted at St. Martha Hospice after receiving their First Communion. It served as a home where senior clerics could live their last years. Increasingly it served as a residence for clerics assigned to Vatican offices.

== Conclave use ==
A map showing the location of the Domus Sanctae Marthae and the Sistine Chapel relative to St. Peter's Basilica

Pope John Paul II's Apostolic Constitution Universi Dominici gregis of February 1996 changed the rules governing papal conclaves, to house the cardinal-electors at the Domus Sanctae Marthae. The building also houses support staff for conclaves, such as doctors, confessors, cooks, and cleaning staff. It was used for the conclaves of 2005, 2013 and 2025. As the Sistine Chapel, the site of conclave voting, is on the opposite side of St. Peter's Basilica from the Domus, the cardinals are driven to the chapel daily via bus, while others may be allowed to walk, as the areas were secured. Provisions are made that no outsiders can approach or speak to the cardinals during this time.

The Domus was used by the cardinal electors at the 2025 papal conclave following the death of Pope Francis. As the building has 129 total bedrooms, housing the record-high 133 cardinal-electors participating in the 2025 conclave required use of other Vatican facilities. Several cardinals were lodged at the neighbouring Santa Marta Vecchia, or Old Saint Marta building, ordinarily used to house other Vatican officials. Other facilities, including rooms at the Ethiopian College, and apartments owned by the Fabric of Saint Peter were considered for supplemental space.

As at previous conclaves, the cardinal electors were assigned rooms by lot. All radios, television sets and telephones were disconnected, and Wi-Fi blocked, in accordance with regulations which call for the cardinals to be secluded from the outside world. Mobile devices are also surrendered during this time; the Vatican provided alarm clocks to the Cardinals to avoid oversleeping since others rely on their cellphones as alarm clocks. Cooking during the conclave is taken care of by religious sisters, who prepare dishes from the Lazio region surrounding Rome, with strict restrictions on the types of foodstuffs served.

== Papal residence (2013–2025) ==
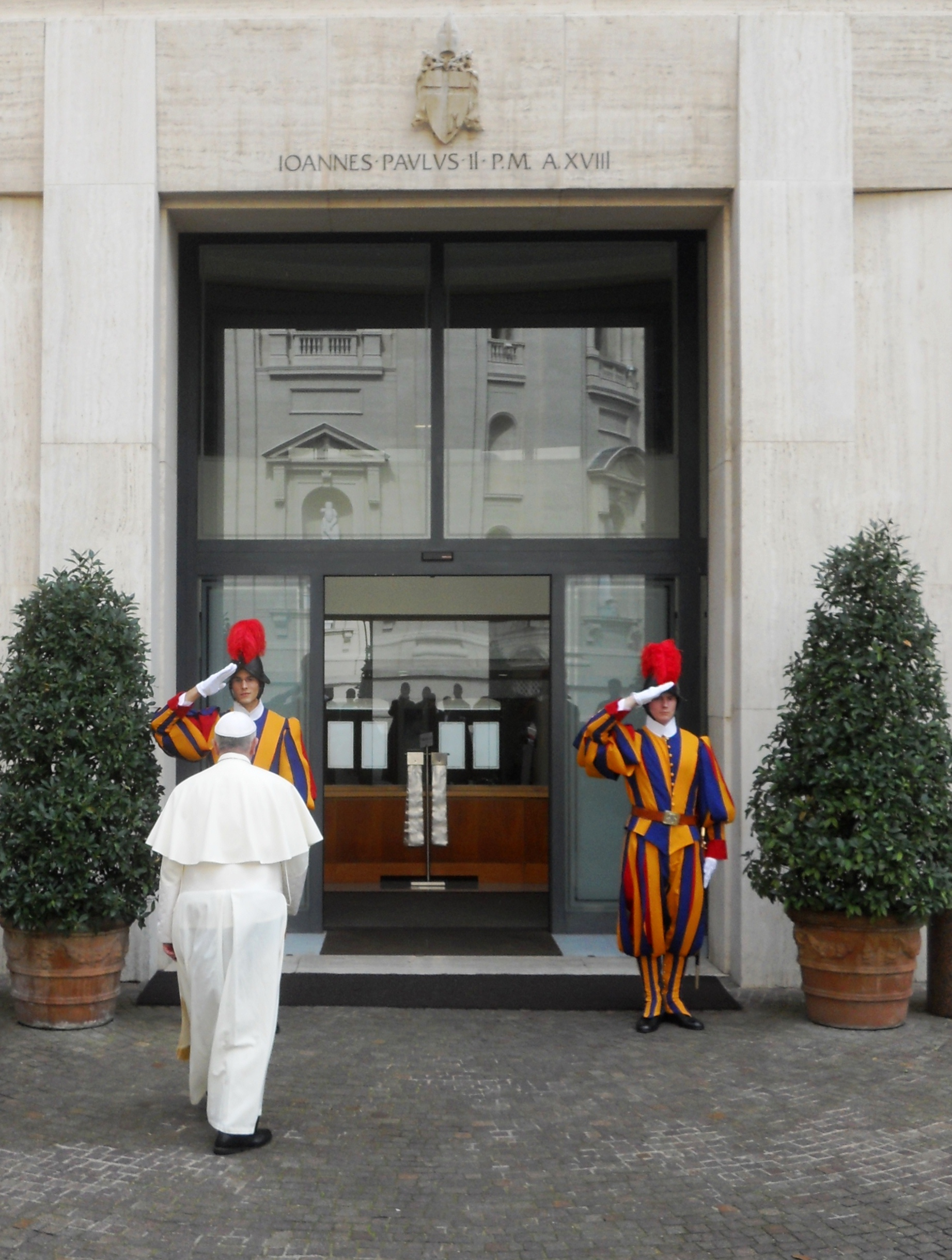
Pope Francis enters the Domus Sanctae Marthae.

On 26 March 2013, the Vatican announced that Pope Francis would not move into the papal apartments in the Apostolic Palace. He was the first pope not to live in the papal apartments on the third floor of the Apostolic Palace since Pius X occupied them in 1903. Rather, he used the palace suite there as his office. He remained for a time in the room he was assigned by lot at the start of the conclave that elected him, and then moved to Suite 201 in the Domus Sanctae Marthae. He celebrated morning Mass and took communal meals in the residence.

Francis explained his decision saying: "The residence in the Apostolic Palace is ... large and made with good taste, but not luxurious.... It is large, but the entrance is narrow. Only one person at a time can get in and I cannot live alone. I must live my life with others."

He occupied a bedroom furnished with basic necessities, a wooden standing crucifix, along with a small statue of Our Lady of Luján, the Marian patroness of Argentina, Uruguay, and Paraguay. Outside his bedroom were two Swiss Guards who worked day and night shifts, and a statue of Saint Joseph under which the pontiff placed prayer requests.

Pope Francis died on April 21, 2025, at 07:35 CEST, inside his apartment. At 09:45 Cardinal Kevin Farrell, the camerlengo of the Holy Roman Church, announced his death from the complex's chapel. The rite of certification of death and the laying of the body in the coffin took place at the same chapel at 20:00, presided by Farrell, in the presence of the Dean of the College of Cardinals, the Pope's relatives, and the Vatican Health Department. The apartment where Pope Francis lived was later sealed by Cardinal Farrell, along with the papal apartments at the Apostolic Palace. Following the 2025 conclave that elected Leo XIV, media reported that he would take up permanent residence in the Apostolic Palace rather than in the Domus.

== See also ==
- Index of Vatican City-related articles
- The Santa Marta Group, a Catholic leadership group combating modern slavery, takes its name from the papal residence.
