= United Arab Emirates =

Country in West Asia

United Arab Emirates الإِمَارَات العَرَبِيَّة المُتَّحِدة (Arabic) al-Imārāt al-'Arabiyya al-Muttaḥida
- Flag Emblem
- Anthem: عيشي بلادي; Īshī Bilādī "Long Live My Country"
- Location of United Arab Emirates (green) in the Arabian Peninsula
- United Arab Emirates
- Capital: Abu Dhabi; 24°28′N 54°22′E
- Largest city: Dubai; 25°15′N 55°18′E
- Official languages: Arabic
- Common languages: Emirati Arabic; English (Note: English is the most commonly spoken language in the UAE.)
- Ethnic groups (2015): 59.4% South Asian; 38.2% Indian; 9.5% Bangladeshi; 9.4% Pakistani; 2.3% other; 12% Emirati Arab; 10.2% Egyptian; 6.1% Filipino; 12.4% other
- Religion (2020): 74.5% Islam (official); 63.3% Sunni Islam; 6.7% Shia Islam; 12.9% Christianity; 6.2% Hinduism; 3.2% Buddhism; 1.3% Agnosticism; 1.9% other
- Demonym: Emirati
- Government: Federal semi-presidential elective semi-constitutional monarchy
  - President: Mohamed bin Zayed Al Nahyan
  - Vice Presidents: Mohammed bin Rashid Al Maktoum; Mansour bin Zayed Al Nahyan
  - Prime Minister: Mohammed bin Rashid Al Maktoum
  - Deputy Prime Minister: Mansour bin Zayed Al Nahyan Saif bin Zayed Al Nahyan Maktoum bin Mohammed Al Maktoum Hamdan bin Mohammed Al Maktoum
- Legislature: Federal Supreme Council

Establishment
  - British protectorate as part of Trucial States: 1820 and 1892
  - Independence from the United Kingdom: 2 December 1971
  - Admission of Ras Al Khaimah: 10 February 1972

Area
  - Total: 83,600 km^{2} (32,300 sq mi) (114th)
  - Water (%): Negligible

Population
  - 2024 estimate: ▲11,027,129
  - Density: 132/km^{2} (341.9/sq mi) (83rd)
- GDP (PPP): 2026 estimate
  - Total: ▼$968.842 billion (35th)
  - Per capita: ▼$83,704 (13th)
- GDP (nominal): 2026 estimate
  - Total: ▲$661.018 billion (29th)
  - Per capita: ▲$57,109 (21st)
- Gini (2018): 26 low inequality
- HDI (2023): ▲0.940 very high (15th)
- Currency: Emirati dirham (AED)
- Time zone: UTC+04:00 (GST)
- Calling code: +971
- ISO 3166 code: AE
- Internet TLD: .ae; امارات.
- Website u.ae

The United Arab Emirates (UAE), (Note: Arabic: الإمارات العربيّة المتّحدة, romanised: al-ʾImārāt al-ʿArabiyya al-Muttaḥida ALA-LC: al-Imārāt al-ʻArabīyah al-Muttaḥidah) also known simply as the Emirates, (Note: Arabic: الإمارات, romanised: al-ʾImārāt) is a country in West Asia, situated at the eastern end of the Arabian Peninsula. It is a federal semi-constitutional monarchy made up of seven emirates, with Abu Dhabi serving as its national capital. The UAE borders Oman to the east and northeast, and Saudi Arabia to the south and southwest. It shares maritime borders with Saudi Arabia, Qatar, and Iran in the Persian Gulf, and with Oman in the Gulf of Oman. In 2024, the UAE had an estimated population of over 11 million. Dubai is the country's largest city. Islam is the state religion. Arabic is the official language while English remains the most spoken language and the language of business.

The present-day United Arab Emirates is located within the historical region of Eastern Arabia, which was oriented to maritime trade and seafaring. The Portuguese arrived in the region around 1500 and set up bases on the territory while waging wars against the Persians. By the 19th century, with pearling becoming a major economic activity, piracy became rampant in the gulf, prompting British intervention. Local sheikhdoms formed a pact with the United Kingdom to create the Trucial States, a British protectorate that was effectively shielded from attempted Saudi and Omani suzerainty. The Trucial States remained under British influence until full independence as the United Arab Emirates in 1971. Zayed bin Sultan Al Nahyan, ruler of Abu Dhabi and the country's first president (1971–2004), oversaw rapid development of the Emirates by investing revenues from newly found oil into healthcare, education, and infrastructure.

The United Arab Emirates is considered a middle power in global affairs; Dubai serves as an international hub of finance, tourism, and commerce. Only 11% of the population are native Emiratis; the vast majority of inhabitants are expatriates and migrant workers, most of whom are from South Asia. The UAE has the world's seventh-largest oil reserves and seventh-largest natural gas reserves. The UAE has the most diversified economy among the members of the Gulf Cooperation Council (GCC), having become less reliant on natural resources in the 21st century and increasingly focusing on tourism and business. The UAE is a member of the United Nations, Arab League, Organisation of Islamic Cooperation, Non-Aligned Movement, World Trade Organization, and BRICS; it is also a dialogue partner of the Shanghai Cooperation Organisation.

The Federal Supreme Council, made up of the seven ruling emirs, is the highest state authority. It jointly appoints one member as federal president, who appoints a prime minister, who forms and leads the cabinet. The UAE is an authoritarian state but generally liberal by regional standards. It ranks highly in several social indicators such as housing, healthcare, education and personal safety, as well as the highest regionally in the Human Development Index. Human rights organisations consider the UAE substandard on human rights, ranking low in the human freedom index due to reports of government critics being imprisoned and tortured, families harassed by the state security apparatus, and cases of forced disappearances. Individual rights such as the freedoms of assembly, association, expression, and the freedom of the press are severely repressed.

== Etymology ==
The United Arab Emirates is named after the seven emirates that formed a federation: the Emirate of Abu Dhabi, the Emirate of Dubai, the Emirate of Ajman, the Emirate of Sharjah, the Emirate of Ras Al Khaimah, the Emirate of Umm Al Quwain, and the Emirate of Fujairah.

== History ==
=== Antiquity ===
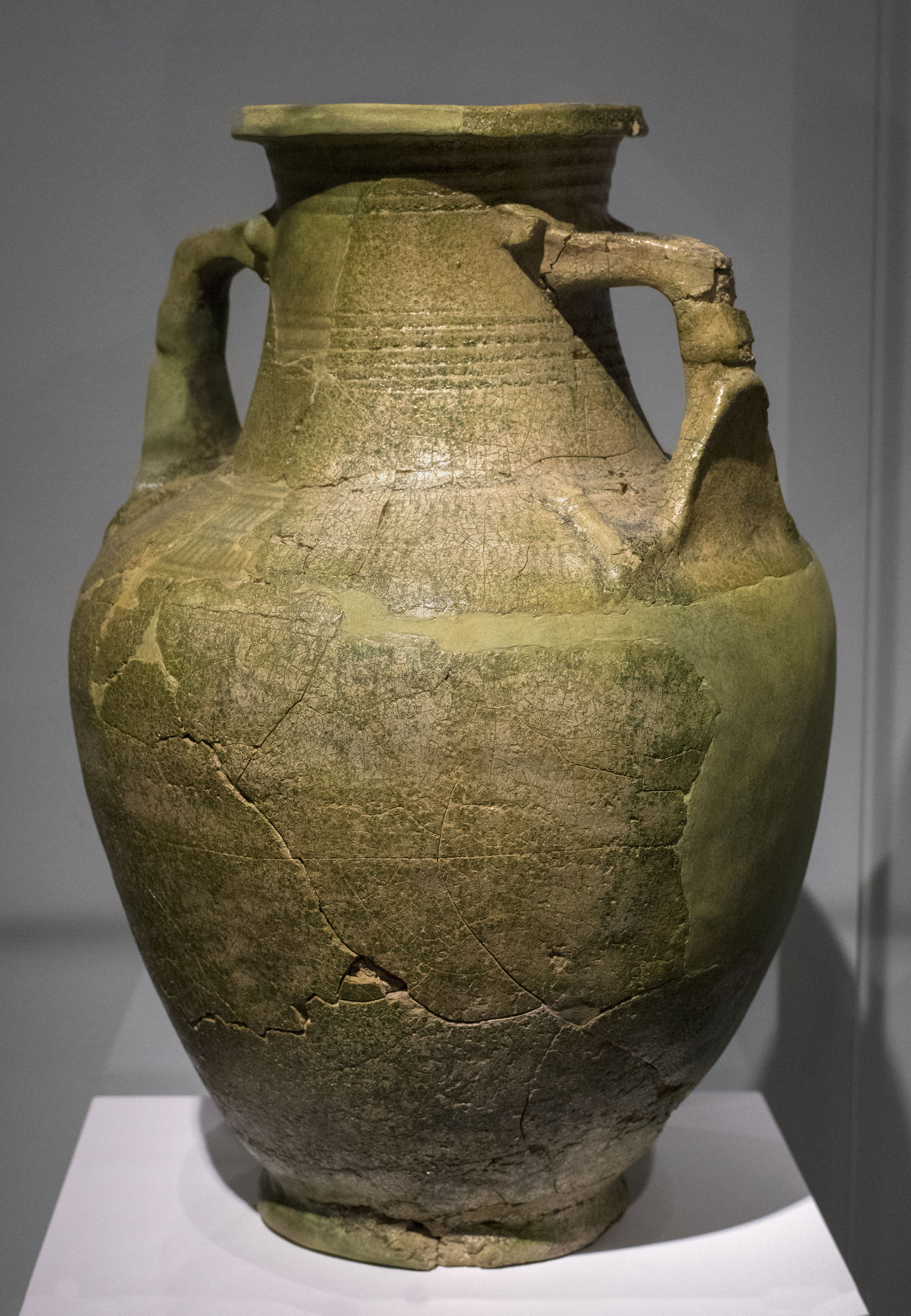
2nd century BCE era jar found in Mleiha Archaeological site in Sharjah

Stone tools recovered reveal a settlement of people from Africa some 127,000 years ago and a stone tool used for butchering animals discovered on the Arabian coast suggests an even older habitation from 130,000 years ago. In time, lively trading links developed with civilisations in Mesopotamia, Iran, and the Harappan culture of the Indus Valley. This contact persisted and became wider, probably motivated by the trade in copper from the Hajar Mountains, which commenced around 3,000 BCE. Sumerian sources talk of the Magan civilisation, which has been identified as encompassing the modern UAE and Oman.

There are six periods of human settlement with distinctive behaviours in the region before Islam, which include the Hafit period from 3,200 to 2,600 BCE, the Umm Al Nar culture from 2,600 to 2,000 BCE, and the Wadi Suq culture from 2,000 to 1,300 BCE. From 1,200 BCE to the advent of Islam in Eastern Arabia, through three distinctive Iron Ages and the Mleiha period, the area was variously occupied by the Achaemenids and other forces, and saw the construction of fortified settlements and extensive husbandry thanks to the development of the falaj irrigation system.

=== Islam ===
The spread of Islam to the northeastern tip of the Arabian Peninsula is thought to have followed directly from a letter sent by the Islamic prophet Muhammad to the rulers of Oman in 630 CE. This led to a group of rulers travelling to Medina, converting to Islam, and subsequently driving a successful uprising against the unpopular Sassanids, who dominated the coast at the time. Following the death of Muhammad, the new Islamic communities south of the Persian Gulf threatened to disintegrate, with insurrections against the Muslim leaders. Caliph Abu Bakr sent an army from the capital Medina which completed its reconquest of the territory (the Ridda Wars) with the Battle of Dibba in which 10,000 lives are thought to have been lost. This assured the integrity of the Caliphate and the unification of the Arabian Peninsula under the newly emerging Rashidun Caliphate.

In 637, Julfar—situated within the geographic boundaries of modern-day Ras Al Khaimah—was an important port that was used as a staging post for the Islamic invasion of the Sasanian Empire. The area of the Al Ain/Buraimi Oasis was known as Tu'am and was an important trading post for camel routes between the coast and the Arabian interior.

The earliest Christian site in the UAE was first discovered in the 1990s, an extensive monastic complex on what is now known as Sir Bani Yas Island and which dates back to the seventh century. Thought to be Nestorian and built in 600 CE, the church appears to have been abandoned peacefully in 750 CE. It forms a rare physical link to a legacy of Christianity, which is thought to have spread across the peninsula from 50 to 350 CE following trade routes. Certainly, by the fifth century, Oman had a bishop named John – the last bishop of Oman being Etienne, in 676 CE.

=== Portuguese era ===
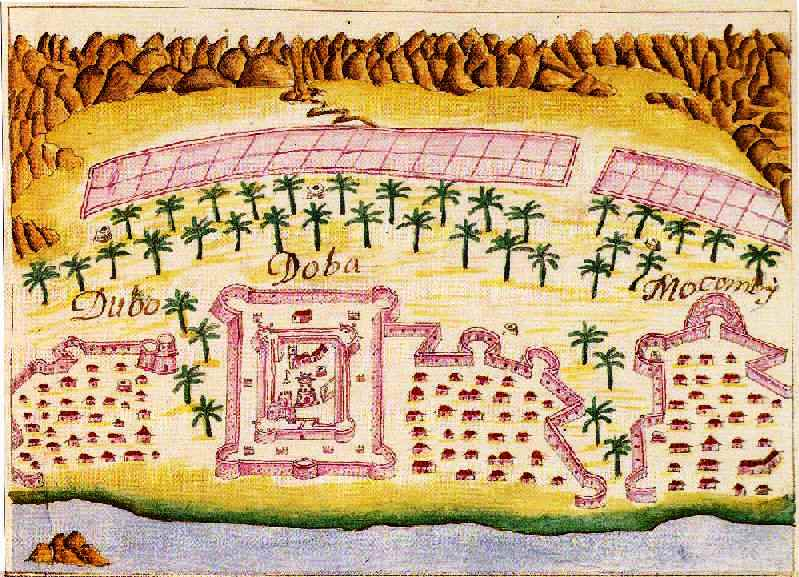
A painting of the Portuguese Empire Doba Fortress in Dibba Al-Hisn in 1620

The harsh desert environment led to the emergence of the "versatile tribesman", nomadic groups who subsisted due to a variety of economic activities, including animal husbandry, agriculture, and hunting. The seasonal movements of these groups led not only to frequent clashes between groups but also to the establishment of seasonal and semi-seasonal settlements and centres. These formed tribal groupings whose names are still carried by modern Emiratis, including the Bani Yas and Al Bu Falah of Abu Dhabi, Al Ain, Liwa, and the west coast; the Dhawahir, Awamir, Al Ali, and Manasir of the interior; the Sharqiyin of the east coast; and the Qawasim to the north.

With the expansion of European colonial empires, Portuguese, English, and Dutch forces appeared in the Persian Gulf region. By the 18th century, the Bani Yas confederation was the dominant force in most of the area now known as Abu Dhabi, while the Northern Al Qawasim (Al Qasimi) dominated maritime commerce. The Portuguese maintained an influence over the coastal settlements, building forts in the wake of the bloody 16th-century conquests of coastal communities by Albuquerque and the Portuguese commanders who followed him – particularly on the east coast at Muscat, Sohar, and Khor Fakkan.

The southern coast of the Persian Gulf was known to the British as the "Pirate Coast", as boats of the Al Qawasim federation harassed British-flagged shipping from the 17th century into the 19th. The charge of piracy is disputed by modern Emirati historians, including the current ruler of Sharjah, Sheikh Sultan Al Qasimi, in his 1986 book The Myth of Arab Piracy in the Gulf.

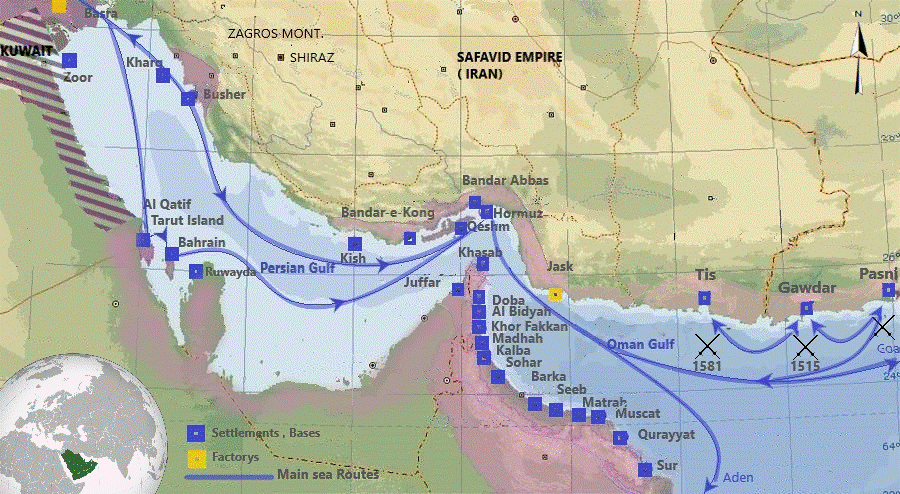
Purple – Portuguese in the Persian Gulf in the 16th and 17th century. Main cities, ports, and routes.

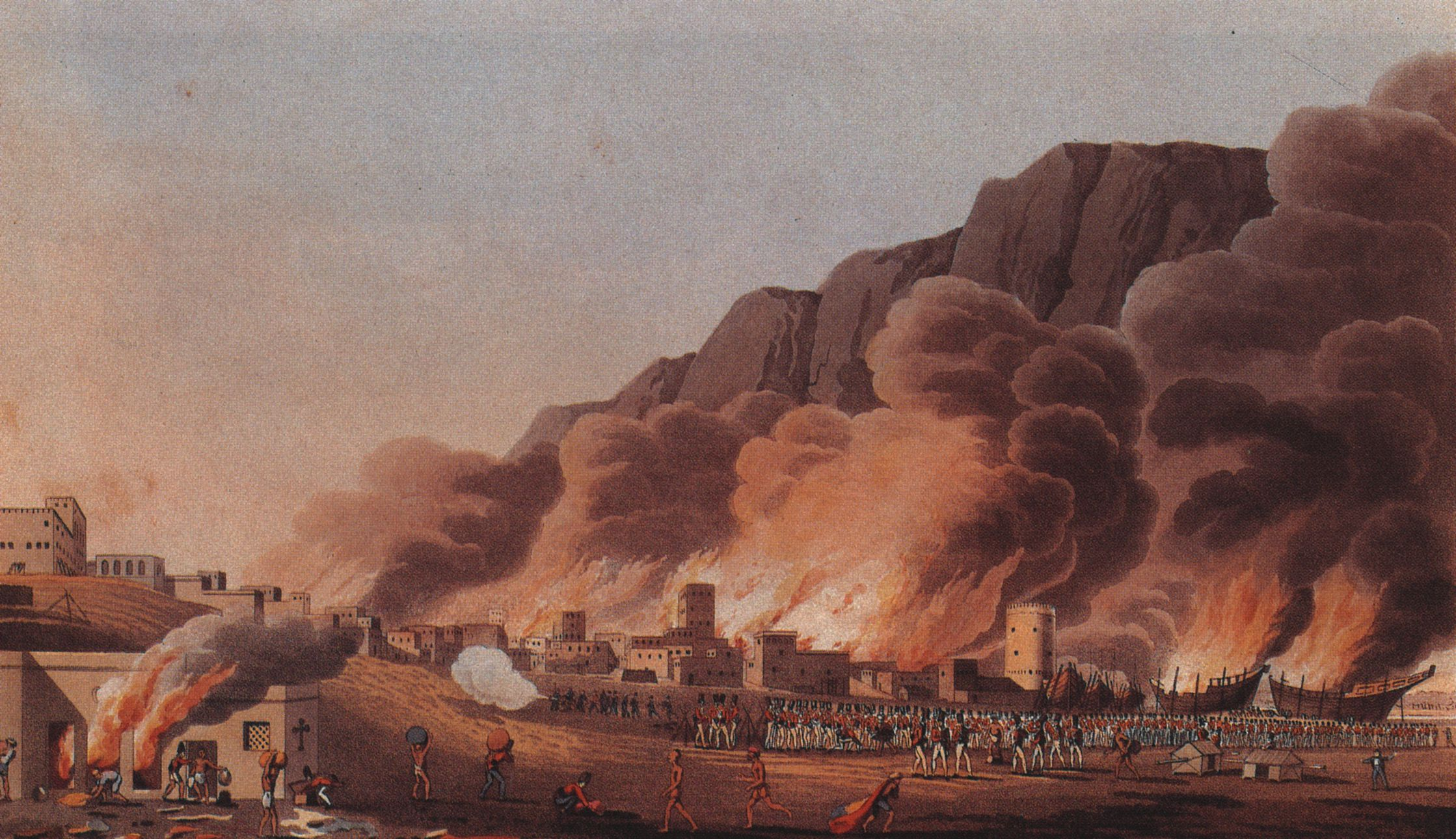
A painting depicting the burning of the coastal town and port of Emirate of Ras Al Khaimah during the Persian Gulf campaign of 1809

British expeditions to protect their Indian trade routes led to campaigns against Ras Al Khaimah and other harbours along the coast, including the Persian Gulf campaign of 1809 and the more successful campaign of 1819. The following year, Britain and a number of local rulers signed a maritime truce, giving rise to the term Trucial States, which came to define the status of the coastal emirates. A further treaty was signed in 1843 and in 1853, the Perpetual Maritime Truce was agreed. To this was added the 'Exclusive Agreements', signed in 1892, which made the Trucial States a British protectorate.

Under the 1892 treaty, the trucial sheikhs agreed not to dispose of any territory except to the British and not to enter into relationships with any foreign government other than the British without their consent. In return, the British promised to protect the Trucial Coast from all aggression by sea and to help in case of land attack. British maritime policing meant that pearling fleets could operate in relative security. However, the British prohibition of the slave trade meant an important source of income was lost to some sheikhs and merchants.

In 1869, the Qubaisat tribe settled at Khor Al Adaid and tried to enlist the support of the Ottomans. Khor Al Adaid was claimed by Abu Dhabi at that time, a claim supported by the British. In 1906, the British Political Resident, Percy Cox, confirmed in writing to the ruler of Abu Dhabi, Zayed bin Khalifa Al Nahyan ('Zayed the Great'), that Khor Al Adaid belonged to his sheikhdom.

=== Discovery of oil ===
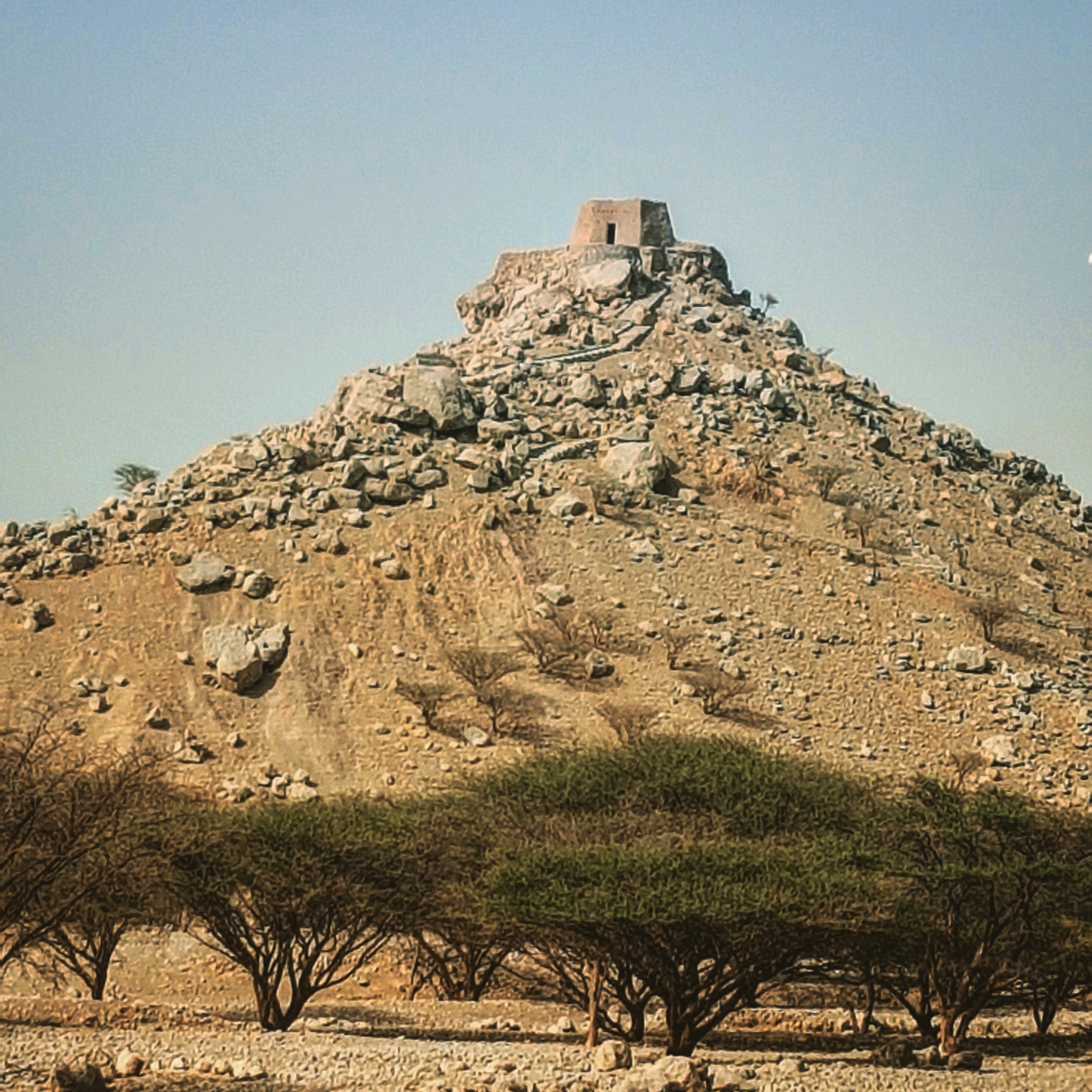
Dhayah Fort at the hill top. In 1819 it was the last Al-Qasimi stronghold to fall in the Persian Gulf campaign of 1819. The fall of Dhayah was to pave the way for the signing of the General Maritime Treaty of 1820.

During the 19th and early 20th centuries, the pearling industry thrived, providing both income and employment to the people of the Persian Gulf. The First World War had a severe impact on the industry, but it was the economic depression of the late 1920s and early 1930s, coupled with the invention of the cultured pearl, that wiped out the trade. The remnants of the trade eventually faded away shortly after the Second World War, when the newly independent Government of India imposed heavy taxation on imported pearls. The decline of pearling resulted in extreme economic hardship in the Trucial States.

In 1922, the British government secured undertakings from the rulers of the Trucial States not to sign concessions with foreign companies without their consent. Aware of the potential for the development of natural resources such as oil, following finds in Persia (from 1908) and Mesopotamia (from 1927), a British-led oil company, the Iraq Petroleum Company (IPC), showed an interest in the region. The Anglo-Persian Oil Company (APOC, later to become British Petroleum, or BP) had a 23.75% share in IPC. From 1935, onshore concessions to explore for oil were granted by local rulers, with APOC signing the first one on behalf of Petroleum Concessions Ltd (PCL), an associate company of IPC.

APOC was prevented from developing the region alone because of the restrictions of the Red Line Agreement, which required it to operate through IPC. A number of options between PCL and the trucial rulers were signed, providing useful revenue for communities experiencing poverty following the collapse of the pearl trade. However, the wealth of oil which the rulers could see from the revenues accruing to surrounding countries remained elusive. The first bore holes in Abu Dhabi were drilled by IPC's operating company, Petroleum Development (Trucial Coast) Ltd (PDTC) at Ras Sadr in 1950, with a 13,000-foot-deep (4,000-metre) bore hole taking a year to drill and turning out dry, at the tremendous cost at the time of £1 million.

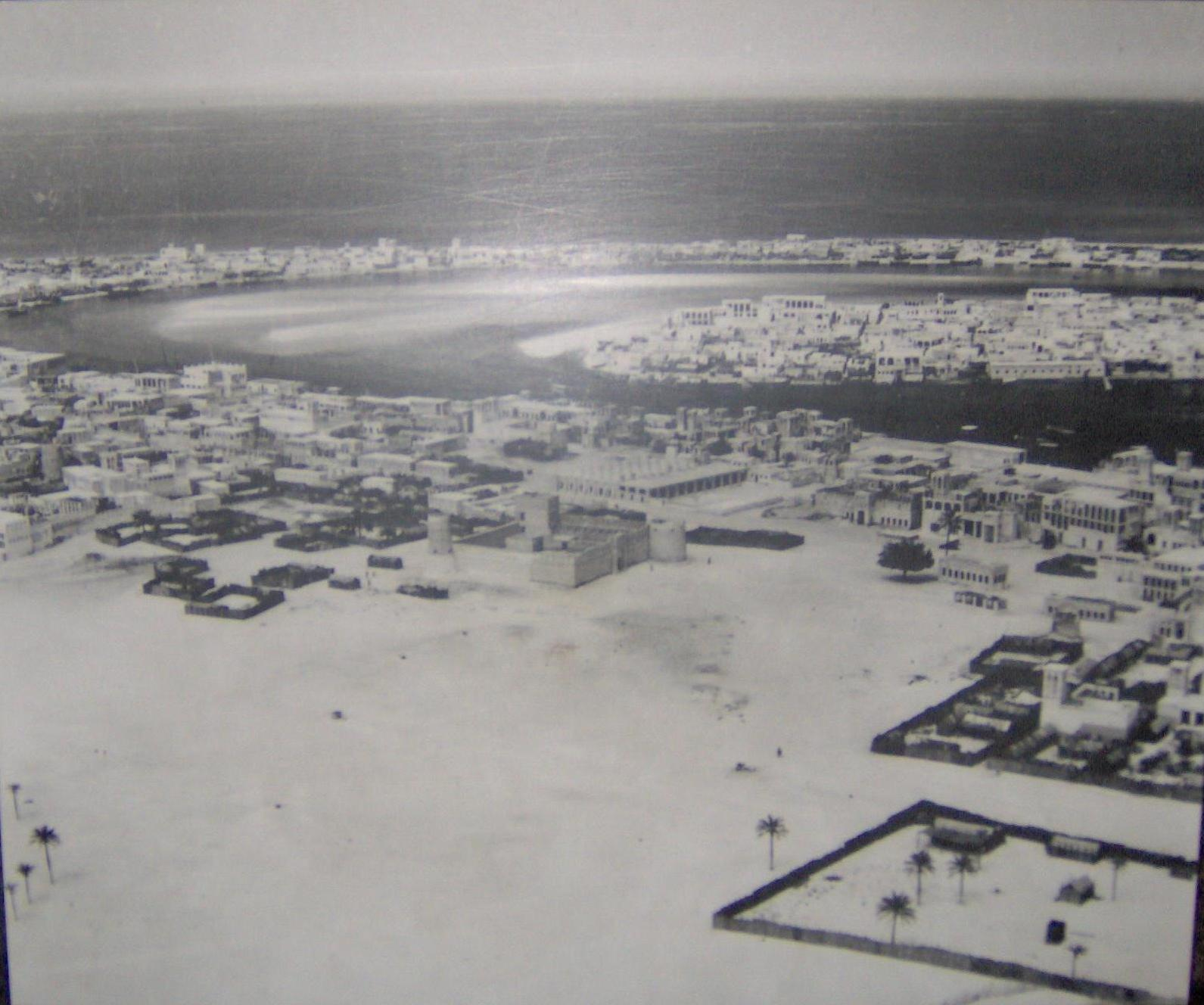
Dubai in 1950: the area in this photo shows Bur Dubai in the foreground (centred on Al-Fahidi Fort), Deira in middle-right on the other side of the creek, and Al Shindagha (left) and Al Ras (right) in the background across the creek, from Deira.

The British set up a development office that helped in some small developments in the emirates. The seven sheikhs of the emirates then decided to form a council to coordinate matters between them and took over the development office. In 1952, they formed the Trucial States Council, and appointed Adi Al Bitar, Dubai's Sheikh Rashid bin Saeed Al Maktoum's legal advisor, as secretary general and legal advisor to the council. The council was terminated once the United Arab Emirates was formed. The tribal nature of society and the lack of definition of borders between emirates frequently led to disputes, settled either through mediation or, more rarely, force. The Trucial Oman Scouts was a small military force used by the British to keep the peace.

In 1953, a subsidiary of BP, D'Arcy Exploration Ltd, obtained an offshore concession from the ruler of Abu Dhabi. BP joined with Compagnie Française des Pétroles (later Total) to form operating companies, Abu Dhabi Marine Areas Ltd (ADMA) and Dubai Marine Areas Ltd (DUMA). A number of undersea oil surveys were carried out, including one led by the famous marine explorer Jacques Cousteau.

In 1958, a floating platform rig was towed from Hamburg, Germany, and positioned over the Umm Shaif pearl bed, in Abu Dhabi waters, where drilling began. In March, it struck oil in the Upper Thamama rock formation. This was the first commercial discovery of the Trucial Coast, leading to the first exports of oil in 1962. ADMA made further offshore discoveries at Zakum and elsewhere, and other companies made commercial finds such as the Fateh oilfield off Dubai and the Mubarak field off Sharjah (shared with Iran).

Meanwhile, onshore exploration was hindered by territorial disputes. In 1955, the United Kingdom represented Abu Dhabi and Oman in their dispute with Saudi Arabia over the Buraimi Oasis. A 1974 agreement between Abu Dhabi and Saudi Arabia seemed to have settled the Abu Dhabi-Saudi border dispute, but this has not been ratified. The UAE's border with Oman was ratified in 2008.

PDTC continued its onshore exploration away from the disputed area, drilling five more bore holes that were also dry. However, on 27 October 1960, the company discovered oil in commercial quantities at the Murban No. 3 well on the coast near Tarif. In 1962, PDTC became the Abu Dhabi Petroleum Company. As oil revenues increased, the ruler of Abu Dhabi, Zayed bin Sultan Al Nahyan, undertook a massive construction programme, building schools, housing, hospitals, and roads. When Dubai's oil exports commenced in 1969, Sheikh Rashid bin Saeed Al Maktoum, the ruler of Dubai, was able to invest the revenues from the limited reserves found to spark the diversification drive that would create the modern global city of Dubai.

=== Independence ===
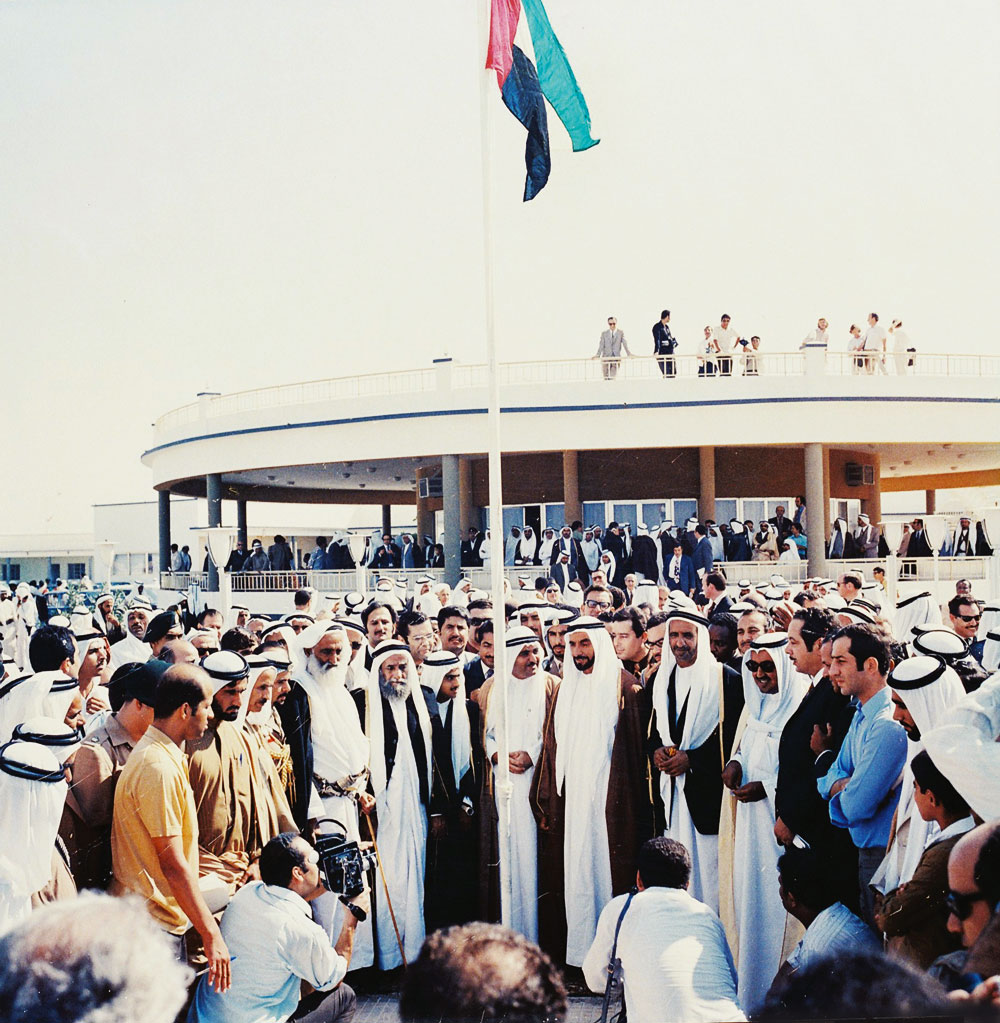
Historic photo depicting the first hoisting of the United Arab Emirates flag by the rulers of the emirates at the Union House in Dubai on 2 December 1971

By 1966, it had become clear that the British government could no longer afford to administer and protect the Trucial States, what is now the United Arab Emirates. British Members of Parliament (MPs) debated the preparedness of the Royal Navy to defend the sheikhdoms. On 24 January 1968, British Prime Minister Harold Wilson announced the government's decision, reaffirmed in March 1971 by Prime Minister Edward Heath, to end the treaty relationships with the seven trucial sheikhdoms. Days after the announcement, the ruler of Abu Dhabi, Sheikh Zayed bin Sultan Al Nahyan, fearing vulnerability, tried to persuade the British to honour the protection treaties by offering to pay the full costs of keeping the British Armed Forces in the Emirates. The British Conservative government rejected the offer. After Labour MP Goronwy Roberts informed Sheikh Zayed of the news of British withdrawal, the nine Persian Gulf sheikhdoms attempted to form a union of Arab emirates, but by mid-1971 they were still unable to agree on terms of union even though the British treaty relationship was to expire in December of that year.

Fears of vulnerability were realised the day before independence. An Iranian destroyer group broke formation from an exercise in the lower Gulf, sailing to the Tunb islands. On 30 November 1971, the islands were taken by force, civilians and Arab defenders alike allowed to flee. Two British warships, the aircraft carriers HMS Eagle and HMS Albion, stood idle during the course of the invasion. A destroyer group approached the island of Abu Musa as well. But there, Sheikh Khalid bin Muhammad Al Qasimi had already negotiated with the Iranian shah, and the island was quickly leased to Iran for $3 million a year. Meanwhile, Saudi Arabia laid claim to swathes of Abu Dhabi. It was not until 1974 that a border agreement was signed with Saudi Arabia, formally demarcating the frontiers between the UAE and Saudi Arabia. The UAE's sense of threat from Iran influenced its financial support for Iraq during the Iran–Iraq War.

Originally intended to be part of the proposed Federation of Arab Emirates, Bahrain became independent in August, and Qatar in September 1971. When the British-Trucial Sheikhdoms treaty expired on 1 December 1971, both emirates became fully independent. On 2 December 1971, six of the emirates (Abu Dhabi, Ajman, Dubai, Fujairah, Sharjah, and Umm Al Quwain) agreed to enter into a union named the United Arab Emirates. Ras al-Khaimah joined later, on 10 January 1972. In February 1972, the Federal National Council (FNC) was created; it was a 40-member consultative body appointed by the seven rulers. The UAE joined the Arab League on 6 December 1971 and the United Nations on 9 December. It was a founding member of the Gulf Cooperation Council in May 1981, with Abu Dhabi hosting the first GCC summit.

=== Post-independence period ===
The founding fathers of the United Arab Emirates were: Zayed bin Sultan Al Nahyan of Abu Dhabi; Rashid bin Saeed Al Maktoum of Dubai; Khalid bin Muhammad Al Qasimi of Sharjah; Rashid bin Humaid Al Nuaimi of Ajman; Ahmad bin Rashid Al Mualla of Umm Al Quwain; Saqr bin Mohammed Al Qasimi of Ras Al Khaimah and Mohammed bin Hamad Al Sharqi of Fujairah.

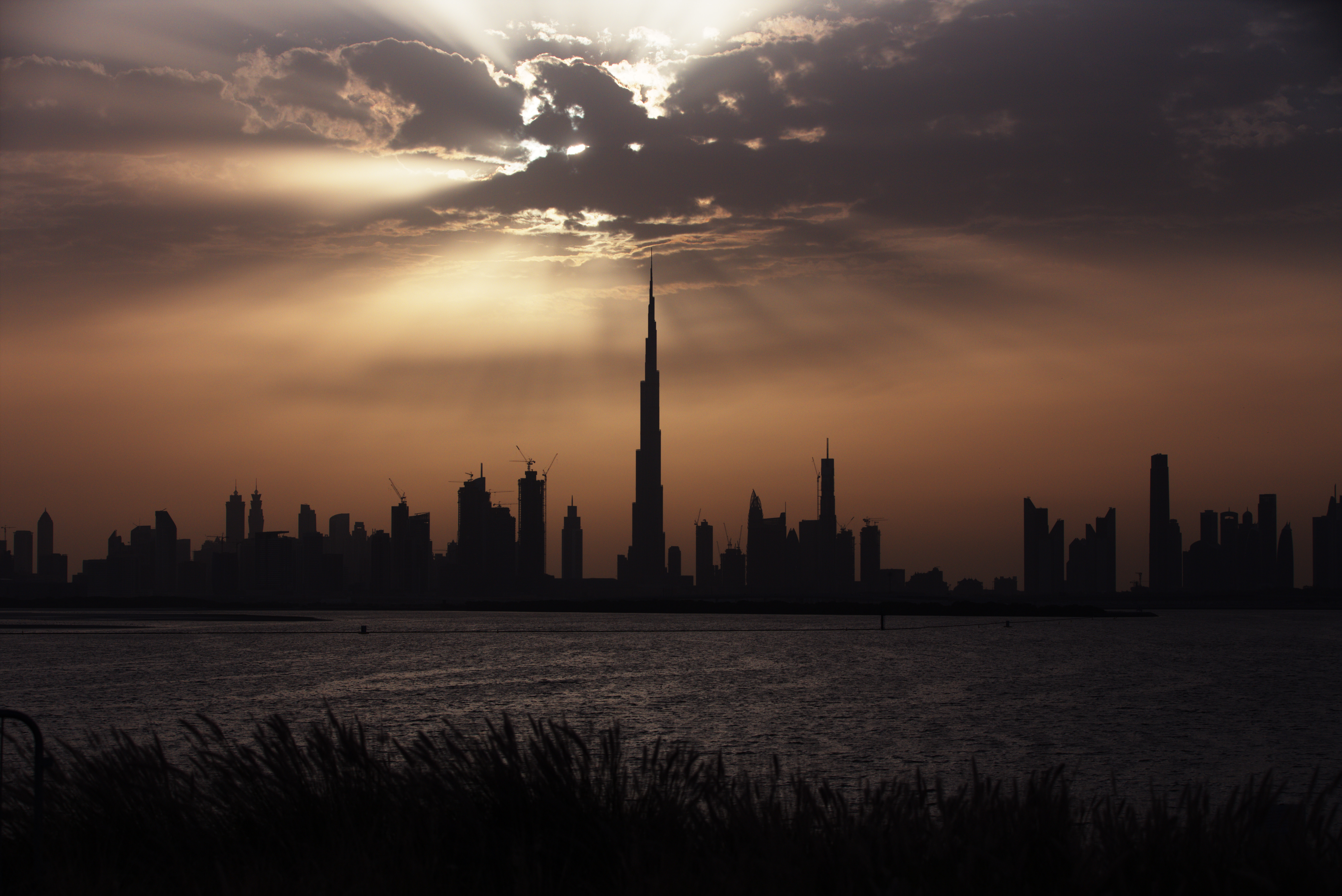
Skyline of Dubai

The UAE supported military operations by the US and other coalition states engaged in the Gulf War against Saddam Hussein in Ba'athist Iraq (1991), as well as operations supporting the global war on terror for the Horn of Africa at Al Dhafra Air Base located outside of Abu Dhabi. The air base also supported Allied operations during the 1991 Persian Gulf War and Operation Northern Watch. The country had already signed a military defence agreement with the U.S. in 1994 and one with France in 1995. In January 2008, France and the UAE signed a deal allowing France to set up a permanent military base in the emirate of Abu Dhabi. The UAE joined international military operations in Libya in March 2011.

On 2 November 2004, the UAE's first president, Sheikh Zayed bin Sultan Al Nahyan, died. Sheikh Khalifa bin Zayed Al Nahyan was elected as the president of the UAE. Sheikh Mohammed bin Zayed Al Nahyan succeeded Sheikh Khalifa as crown prince of Abu Dhabi. In January 2006, Sheikh Maktoum bin Rashid Al Maktoum, the prime minister of the UAE and the ruler of Dubai, died, and Sheikh Mohammed bin Rashid Al Maktoum assumed both roles.

The first ever national elections were held on 16 December 2006. A number of voters chose half of the members of the Federal National Council. The UAE has largely escaped the Arab Spring, which other countries have experienced; however, 60 Emirati activists from Al Islah were apprehended for an alleged coup attempt and the attempt of the establishment of an Islamist state in the UAE. Mindful of the protests in nearby Bahrain, in November 2012 the UAE outlawed online mockery of its government or attempts to organise public protests through social media.

On 29 January 2020, the COVID-19 pandemic was confirmed to have reached the UAE. Two months later, in March, the government announced the closure of shopping malls, schools, and places of worship, in addition to imposing a 24-hour curfew, and suspending all Emirates passenger flights. This resulted in a major economic downturn, which eventually led to the merger of more than 50% of the UAE's federal agencies.

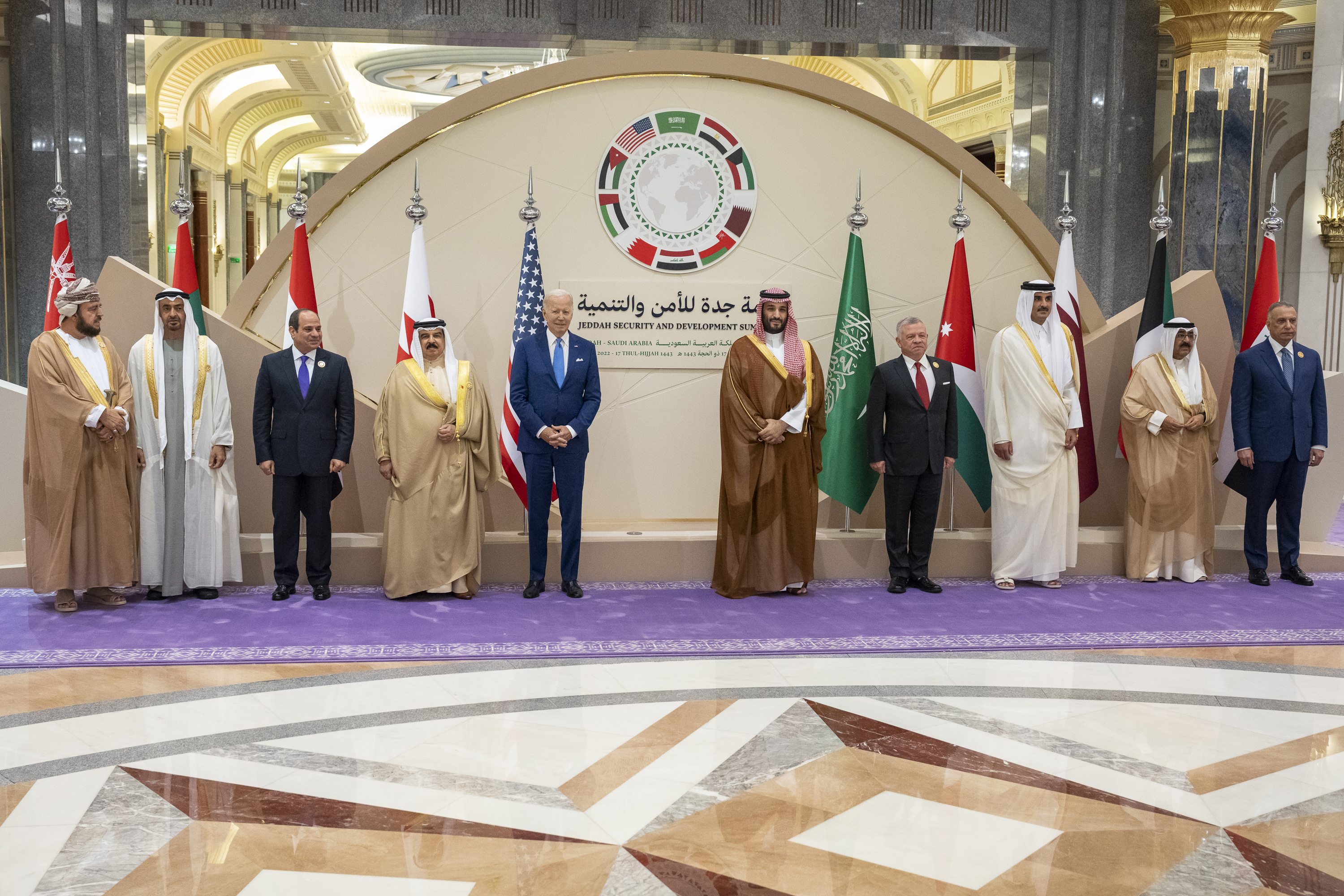
UAE's President Mohamed bin Zayed Al Nahyan and other leaders at the GCC+3 summit in Jeddah, 16 July 2022

On 29 August 2020, the UAE established normal diplomatic relations with Israel and with the help of the United States, they signed the Abraham Accords with Bahrain.

On 9 February 2021, the UAE achieved a historic milestone when its probe, named Hope, successfully reached Mars's orbit. The UAE became the first country in the Arab world to reach Mars, the fifth country to successfully reach Mars, and the second country, after an Indian probe, to orbit Mars on its maiden attempt.

On 14 May 2022, Sheikh Mohamed bin Zayed Al Nahyan was elected as the UAE's new president after the death of Sheikh Khalifa bin Zayed Al Nahyan.

Following the beginning of coordinated U.S. and Israeli strikes on Iran on 28 February 2026, the UAE faced a series of retaliatory drone and missile attacks from Iran, whose Islamic Revolutionary Guard Corps targeted both U.S. military assets and critical Emirati economic infrastructure. The UAE is strengthening security cooperation with Israel. At the start of the Iran war, Israel sent its Iron Dome missile-defence system and military personnel to operate it to the UAE, the first time the technology has been sent to another country. The Wall Street Journal reported citing people familiar with the matter that the UAE had been discreetly striking Iran throughout the war, including a strike on Lavan Island in early April, thus making it an active belligerent.

The UAE announced its decision to quit OPEC on 28 April 2026 effective 1 May 2026, partially to allow increased oil production. On 2 May, the UAE and Qatar signed a new free trade zone agreement with South Korea.

== Geography ==
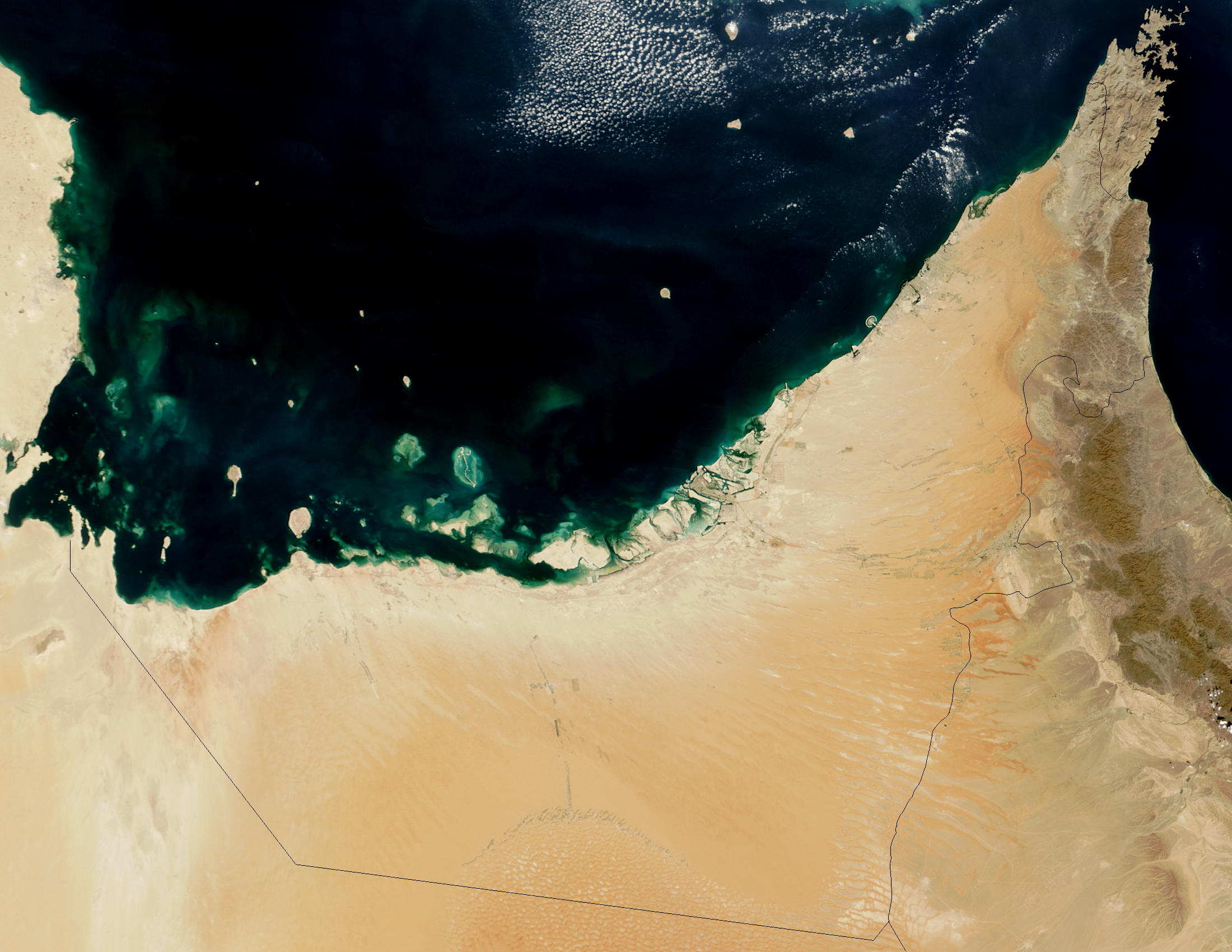
Satellite image of United Arab Emirates

The United Arab Emirates is situated in the Middle East, bordering the Gulf of Oman and the Persian Gulf, between Oman and Saudi Arabia; it is in a strategic location slightly south of the Strait of Hormuz, a vital transit point for world crude oil.

The UAE lies between 22°30' and 26°10' north latitude and between 51° and 56°25′ east longitude. It shares a 530-kilometre (330 mi) border with Saudi Arabia on the west, south, and southeast, and a 450-kilometre (280 mi) border with Oman on the southeast and northeast. The land border with Qatar in the Khor Al Adaid area is about nineteen kilometres (12 miles) in the northwest; however, it is a source of ongoing dispute. Following Britain's military departure from the UAE in 1971, and its establishment as a new state, the UAE laid claim to Iranian-occupied islands of Abu Musa and the Greater and the Lesser Tunbs, when Iran captured them during the British rule, resulting in disputes with Iran that remain unresolved. The UAE also disputes claim on other islands against the neighbouring state of Qatar. The largest emirate, Abu Dhabi, accounts for 87% of the UAE's total area, 67,340 square kilometres (26,000 sq mi). The smallest emirate, Ajman, encompasses only 259 km^{2} (100 sq mi).

The UAE coast stretches for nearly 650 km (404 mi) along the southern shore of the Persian Gulf, briefly interrupted by an isolated outcrop of the Sultanate of Oman. Six of the emirates are situated along the Persian Gulf, and the seventh, Fujairah, is on the eastern coast of the peninsula with direct access to the Gulf of Oman. Most of the coast consists of salt pans that extend 8–10 km (5.0–6.2 mi) inland. The largest natural harbour is at Dubai, although other ports have been dredged at Abu Dhabi, Sharjah, and elsewhere. Numerous islands are found in the Persian Gulf, and the ownership of some of them has been the subject of international disputes with both Iran and Qatar. The smaller islands, as well as many coral reefs and shifting sandbars, are a menace to navigation. Strong tides and occasional windstorms further complicate ship movements near the shore. The UAE also has a stretch of the Al Bāţinah coast of the Gulf of Oman. The Musandam Peninsula, the very tip of Arabia by the Strait of Hormuz, and Madha are exclaves of Oman separated by the UAE.

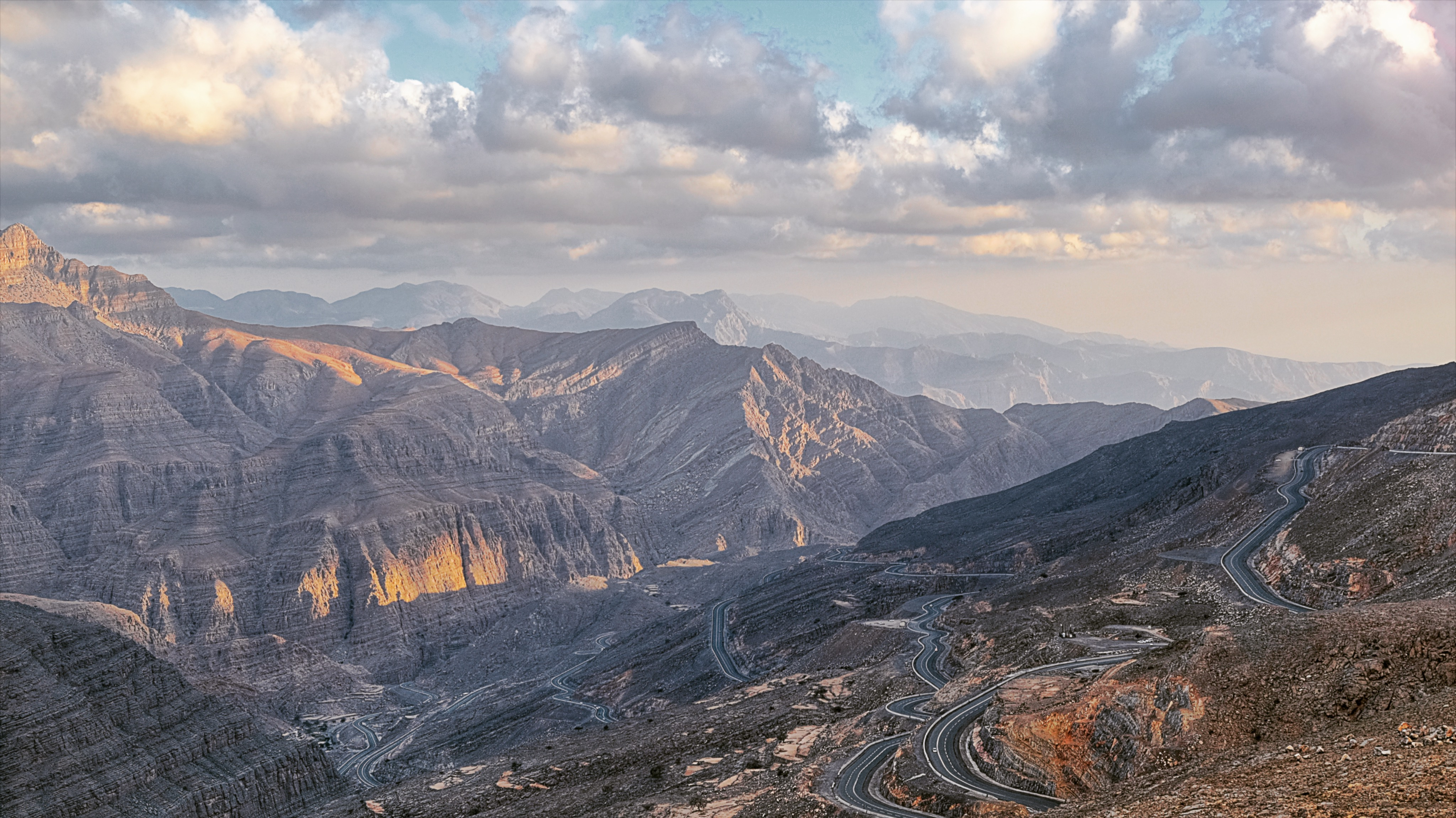
Roads leading to Jebel Jais, the highest mountain in the UAE (1,892 m), in Ras Al Khaimah

South and west of Abu Dhabi, vast, rolling sand dunes merge into the Rub al-Khali (Empty Quarter) of Saudi Arabia. The desert area of Abu Dhabi includes two important oases with adequate underground water for permanent settlements and cultivation. The extensive Liwa Oasis is in the south near the undefined border with Saudi Arabia. About 100 km (62 mi) to the northeast of Liwa is the Al-Buraimi oasis, which extends on both sides of the Abu Dhabi-Oman border. Lake Zakher in Al Ain is a human-made lake near the border with Oman that was created from treated waste water.

Prior to withdrawing from the area in 1971, Britain delineated the internal borders among the seven emirates in order to preempt territorial disputes that might hamper formation of the federation. In general, the rulers of the emirates accepted the British interventions, but in the case of boundary disputes between Abu Dhabi and Dubai, and also between Dubai and Sharjah, conflicting claims were not resolved until after the UAE became independent. The most complicated borders were in the Western Hajar Mountains, where five of the emirates contested jurisdiction over more than a dozen enclaves.

=== Biodiversity ===
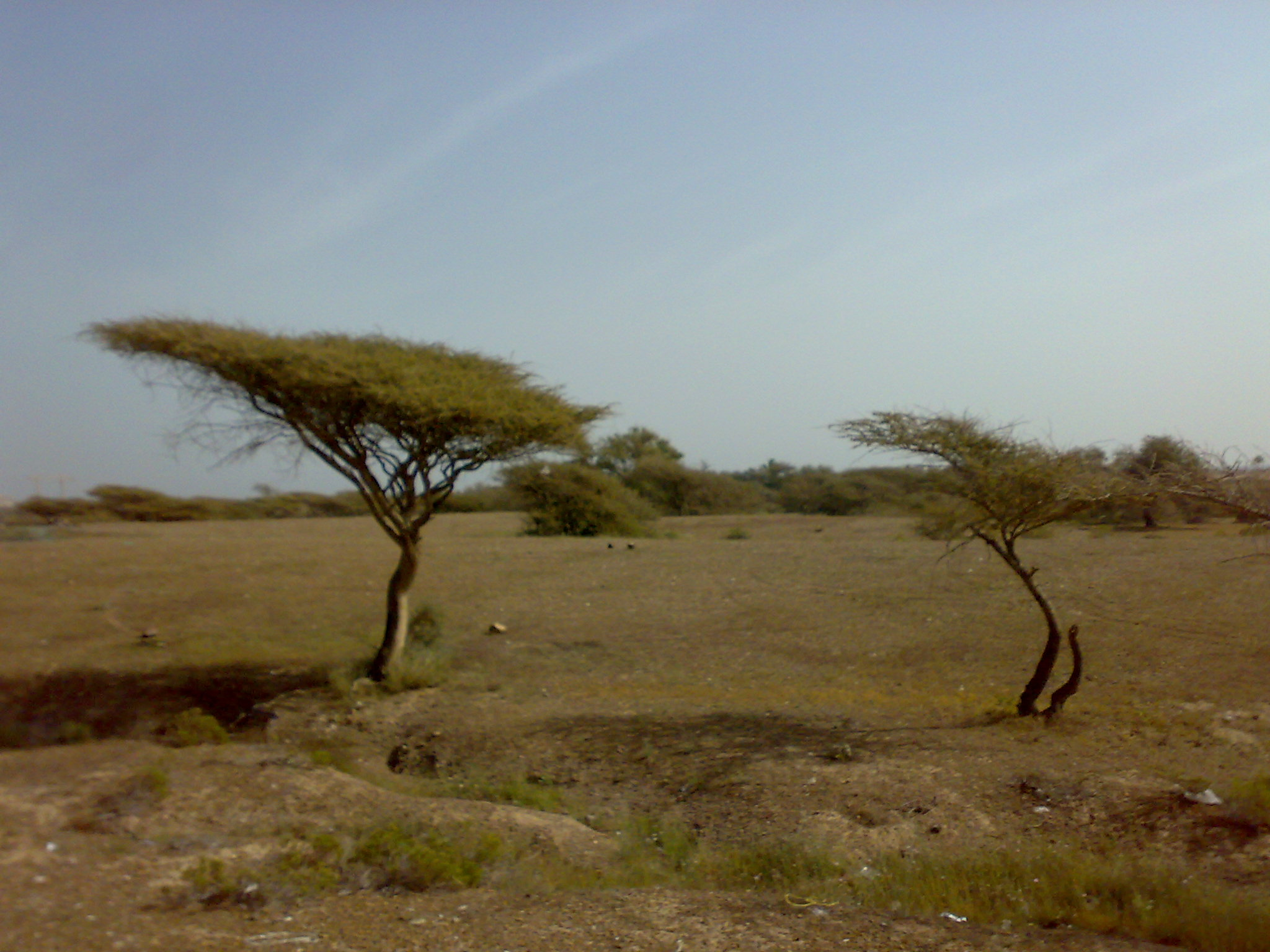
Acacia trees growing in desert suburbs near Fujairah

The UAE contains the following terrestrial ecoregions: Al Hajar montane woodlands and shrublands, Gulf of Oman desert and semi-desert, and Al-Hajar foothill xeric woodlands and shrublands.

The oases grow date palms, acacia, and eucalyptus trees. In the desert, the flora is very sparse and consists of grasses and thorn bushes. The indigenous fauna had come close to extinction because of intensive hunting, which has led to a conservation programme on Sir Bani Yas Island initiated by Sheikh Zayed bin Sultan Al Nahyan in the 1970s, resulting in the survival of, for example, Arabian Oryx, Arabian camel, and leopards. Coastal fish and mammals consist mainly of mackerel, perch, and tuna, as well as sharks and whales.

=== Climate ===
The climate of the UAE is subtropical-arid with hot summers and warm winters. The climate is categorised as desert climate. The hottest months are July and August, when average maximum temperatures reach above 45 °C (113 °F) on the coastal plain. In the Hajar Mountains, temperatures are considerably lower, a result of increased elevation. Average minimum temperatures in January and February are between 10 and 14 °C (50 and 57 °F). During the late summer months, a humid southeastern wind known as Sharqi (i.e. "Easterner") makes the coastal region especially unpleasant. The average annual rainfall in the coastal area is less than 120 mm (4.7 in), but in some mountainous areas annual rainfall often reaches 350 mm (13.8 in). Rain in the coastal region falls in short, torrential bursts during the winter months, sometimes resulting in floods in ordinarily dry wadi beds. The region is prone to occasional, violent dust storms, which can severely reduce visibility.

On 28 December 2004, snow was recorded in the UAE for the first time, in the Jebel Jais mountain cluster in Ras al-Khaimah. A few years later, there were more sightings of snow and hail. The Jebel Jais mountain cluster has experienced snow only twice since records began.

== Government and politics ==
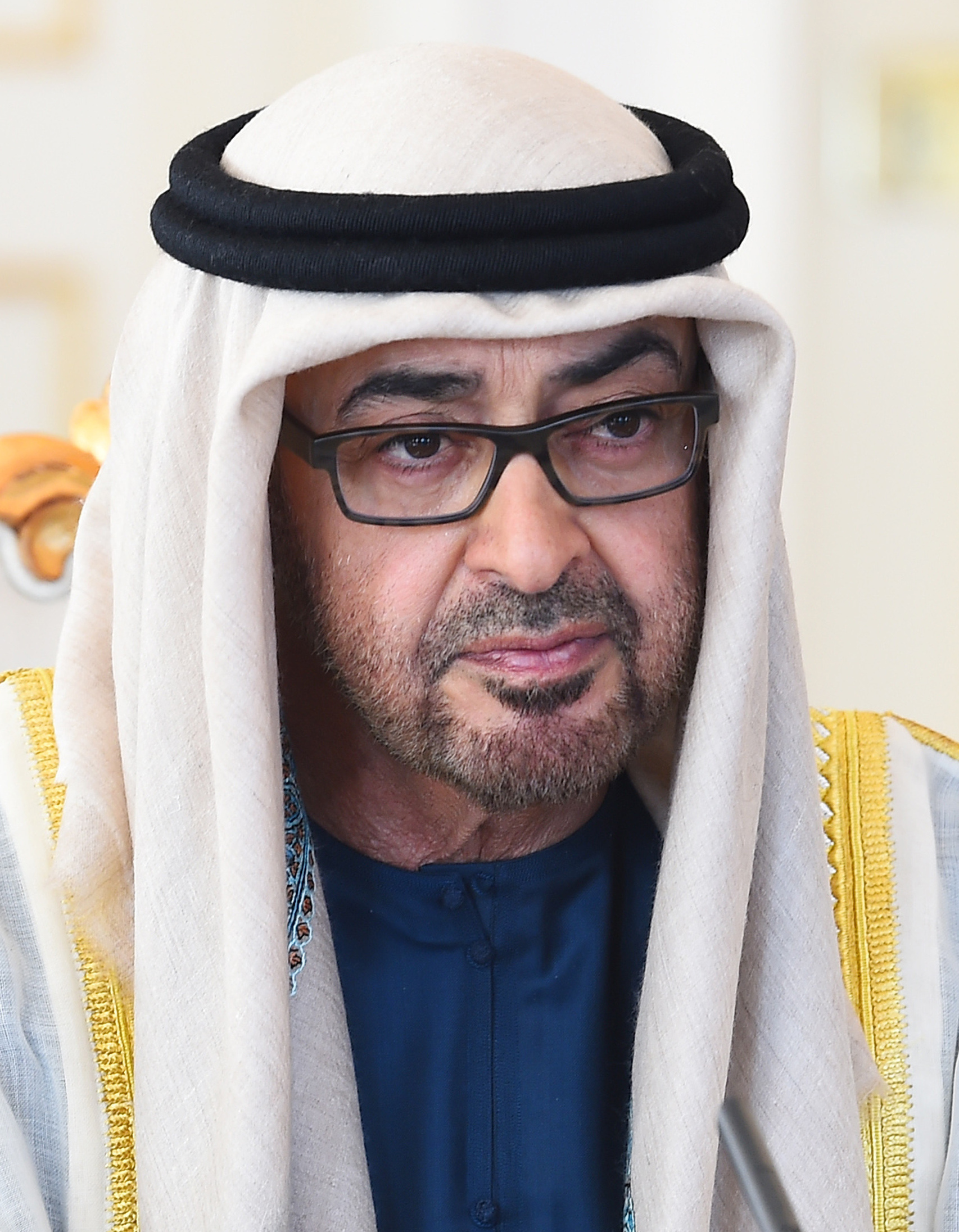
Mohamed bin Zayed Al Nahyan
President

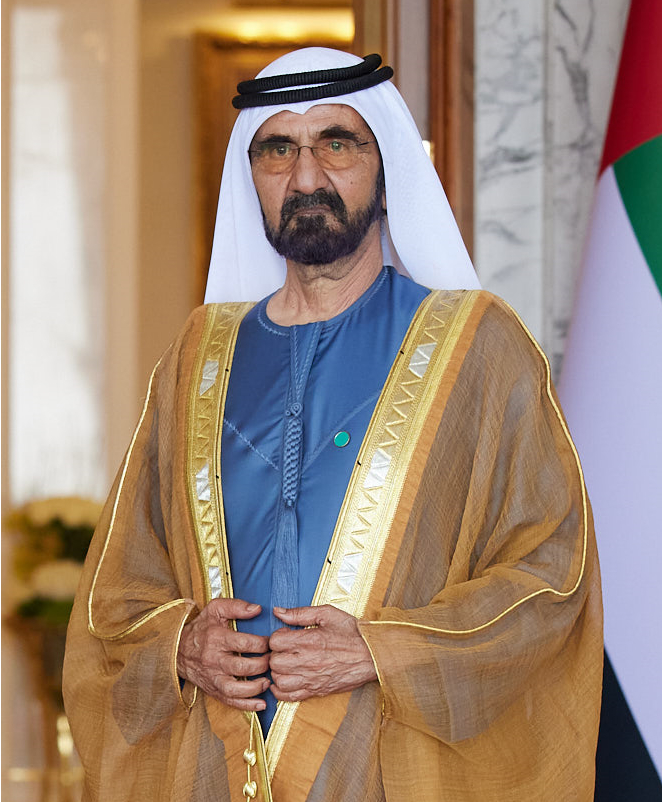
Mohammed bin Rashid Al Maktoum
Prime Minister and
Vice President

The United Arab Emirates is a federal semi-presidential state under a semi-constitutional monarchy made up of seven hereditary tribal monarchy-styled political units called Sheikhdoms. It is governed by a Federal Supreme Council made up of the ruling Sheikhs of Abu Dhabi, Ajman, Fujairah, Sharjah, Dubai, Ras Al Khaimah, and Umm Al Quwain. All responsibilities not granted to the federal government are reserved to the individual emirate. A percentage of revenues from each emirate is allocated to the UAE's central budget.

The UAE uses the title Sheikh instead of Emir to refer to the rulers of individual emirates. The title is used due to the sheikhdom-styled governing system in adherence to the culture of tribes of Arabia, where Sheikh means leader, elder, or the tribal chief of the clan who partakes in shared decision making with his followers. The president and vice president are elected by the Federal Supreme Council. Usually, the Head of the Al Nahyan family, who are based in Abu Dhabi, holds the presidency and the Head of the Al Maktoum family, based in Dubai, the prime ministership. All prime ministers but one have served concurrently as vice president. The federal government is composed of three branches:

- Legislative: A unicameral Federal Supreme Council and the advisory Federal National Council (FNC).
- Executive: The President—who is also commander-in-chief of the military—the prime minister, and the Council of Ministers.
- Judicial: The Supreme Court and lower federal courts.

Entrance to Qasr Al Watan, the presidential palace in Abu Dhabi.

The UAE e-Government is the extension of the UAE federal government in its electronic form. The UAE's Council of Ministers (Arabic: مجلس الوزراء) is the chief executive branch of the government presided over by the prime minister. The prime minister, who is appointed by the Federal Supreme Council, appoints the ministers. The Council of Ministers is made up of 22 members and manages all internal and foreign affairs of the federation under its constitutional and federal law. In December 2019, the UAE became the only Arab country, and one of only five countries in the world, to attain gender parity in a national legislative body, with its lower house being 50 percent women.

The UAE is the only country in the world that has a Ministry of Tolerance, a Ministry of Happiness, and a Ministry of Artificial Intelligence. The UAE also has a virtual ministry called the Ministry of Possibilities, designed to find solutions to challenges and improve quality of life. The UAE also has a National Youth Council, which is represented in the UAE cabinet by the Minister of Youth.

The UAE legislative body is the Federal National Council which convenes nationwide elections every four years. The FNC consists of 40 members drawn from all the emirates. Each emirate is allocated specific seats to ensure full representation. Half are appointed by the rulers of the constituent emirates, and the other half are elected by a small percentage of Emirati citizens, currently 33%, hand-picked by the rulers of each emirate. By law, the council members have to be equally divided between males and females. The FNC is restricted to a largely consultative role.

The UAE is an authoritarian federal monarchy. The UAE has been described as a "tribal autocracy" where the seven constituent monarchies are led by tribal rulers in an autocratic fashion. There are no democratically elected institutions, and there is no formal commitment to free speech. According to human rights organizations, there are systematic human rights violations, including the torture and forced disappearance of government critics. The UAE ranks poorly in freedom indices measuring civil liberties and political rights. The UAE has consistently ranked poorly across a number of freedom indices, including being ranked as "Not Free" in Freedom House's annual Freedom in the World report from 1999 to present day, ranks poorly in the annual Reporters without Borders' Press Freedom Index, International IDEA's Global State of Democracy (GSoD) Indices, the Democracy Tracker, and the Bertelsmann Transformation Index - which describes the UAE as a "moderate monarchy". The country was ranked 91 out of 137 states and is far below the average scoring for development towards a democracy, and is the third least democratic country in the Middle East. The country by all measurements is not democratic, with particular weaknesses in political representation, including inclusive suffrage and credible elections.

=== Administrative divisions ===
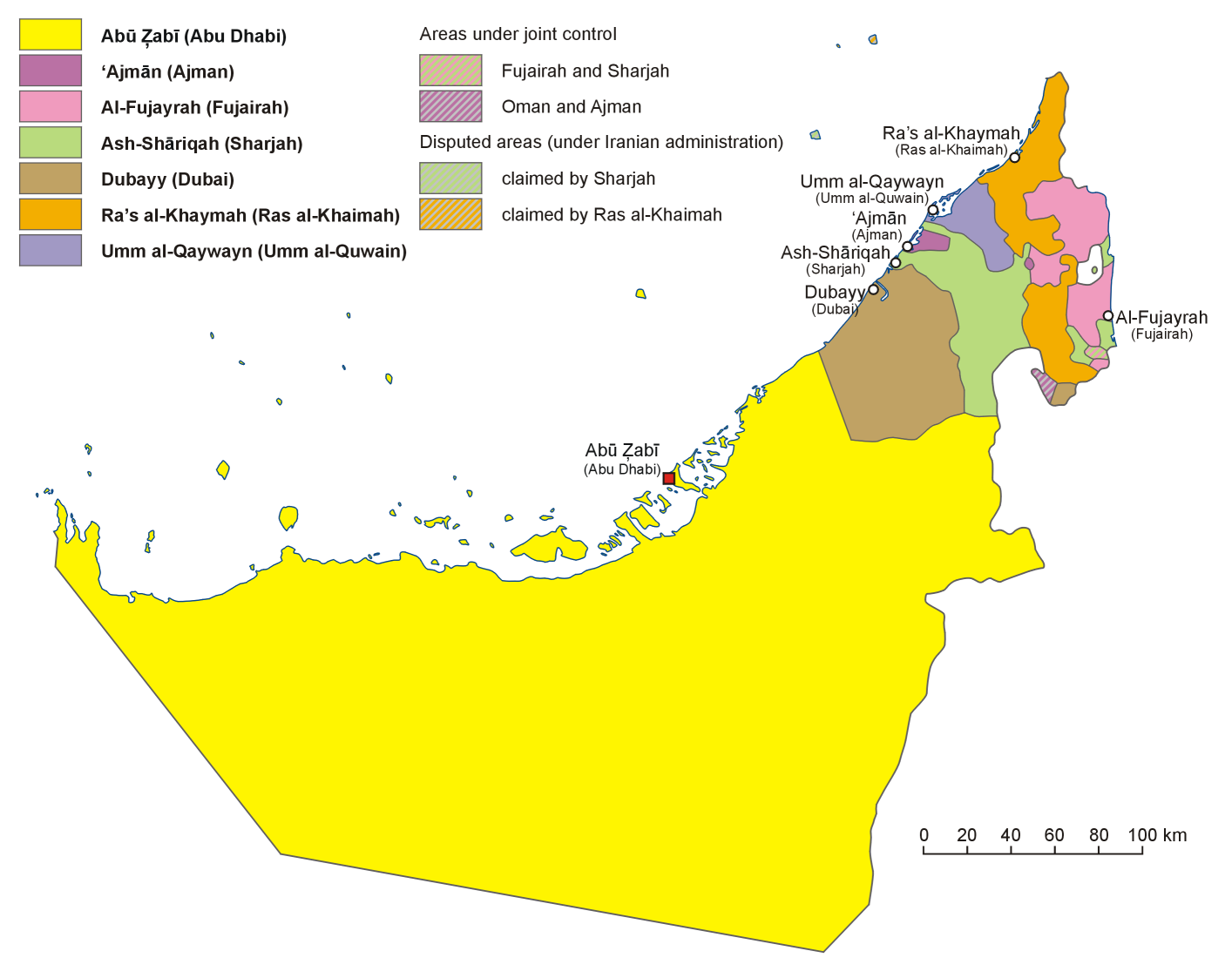

The United Arab Emirates comprises seven emirates. The Emirate of Dubai is the most populous emirate with 35.6% of the UAE population. The Emirate of Abu Dhabi has 31.2%, meaning that over two-thirds of the UAE population lives in either Abu Dhabi or Dubai.

Abu Dhabi has an area of 67,340 square kilometres (26,000 square miles), which is 86.7% of the country's total area, excluding the islands. It has a coastline extending for more than 400 km (250 mi) and is divided for administrative purposes into three major regions. The Emirate of Dubai extends along the Persian Gulf coast of the UAE for approximately 72 km (45 mi). Dubai has an area of 3,885 square kilometres (1,500 square miles), which is equivalent to 5% of the country's total area, excluding the islands. The Emirate of Sharjah extends along approximately 16 km (10 mi) of the UAE's Persian Gulf coastline and for more than 80 km (50 mi) into the interior. The northern emirates which include Fujairah, Ajman, Ras al-Khaimah, and Umm al-Qaiwain all have a total area of 3,881 square kilometres (1,498 square miles). There are two areas under joint control. One is jointly controlled by Oman and Ajman, the other by Fujairah and Sharjah.

There is an Omani exclave surrounded by UAE territory, known as Wadi Madha. It is located halfway between the Musandam peninsula and the rest of Oman in the Emirate of Sharjah. It covers approximately 75 square kilometres (29 square miles) and the boundary was settled in 1969. The north-east corner of Madha is closest to the Khor Fakkan-Fujairah road, barely 10 metres (33 feet) away. Within the Omani exclave of Madha, is a UAE exclave called Nahwa, also belonging to the Emirate of Sharjah. It is about eight kilometres (5.0 miles) on a dirt track west of the town of New Madha. It consists of about forty houses with its own clinic and telephone exchange.

=== Foreign relations ===
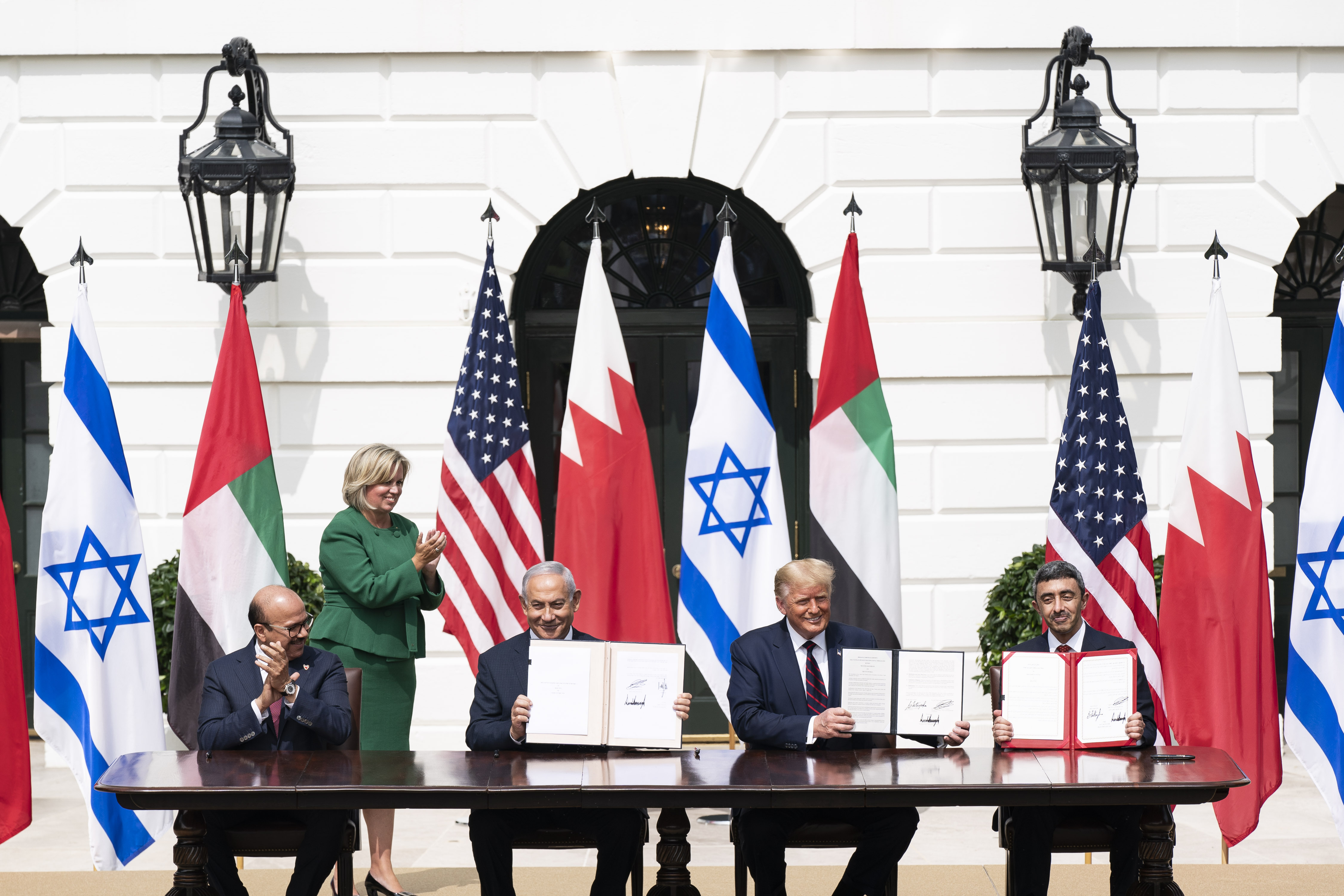
Emirati Minister of Foreign Affairs Abdullah bin Zayed Al Nahyan (furthest right) at the signing of the Abraham Accords

The United Arab Emirates has broad diplomatic and commercial relations with most countries and members of the United Nations, despite significant human rights abuses. It played a significant role in OPEC, prior to its exit from the group on 1 May 2026 and is one of the founding members of the Gulf Cooperation Council (GCC). The UAE is a member of the United Nations and several of its specialised agencies (ICAO, ILO, UPU, WHO, WIPO), as well as the World Bank, IMF, Arab League, Organisation of Islamic Cooperation (OIC), and the Non-Aligned Movement. Also, it is an observer in the Organisation Internationale de la Francophonie. Most countries have diplomatic missions in the capital Abu Dhabi with most consulates being in UAE's largest city, Dubai.

Emirati foreign relations are motivated to a large extent by identity and relationship to the Arab world. The United Arab Emirates has strong ties with Bahrain, China, Egypt, India, Jordan, Pakistan, Russia, Saudi Arabia, and the United States.

Following the British withdrawal from the UAE in 1971 and the establishment of the UAE as a state, the UAE disputed rights to three islands in the Persian Gulf against Iran, namely Abu Musa, Greater Tunb, and Lesser Tunb. The UAE tried to bring the matter to the International Court of Justice, but Iran dismissed the notion. Pakistan was the first country to formally recognise the UAE upon its formation. The UAE alongside multiple Middle Eastern and African countries cut diplomatic ties with Qatar in June 2017 due to allegations of Qatar being a state sponsor of terrorism, resulting in the Qatar diplomatic crisis. Ties were restored in January 2021. The UAE recognised Israel in August 2020, reaching a historic Israel–United Arab Emirates peace agreement and leading towards full normalisation of relations between the two countries.

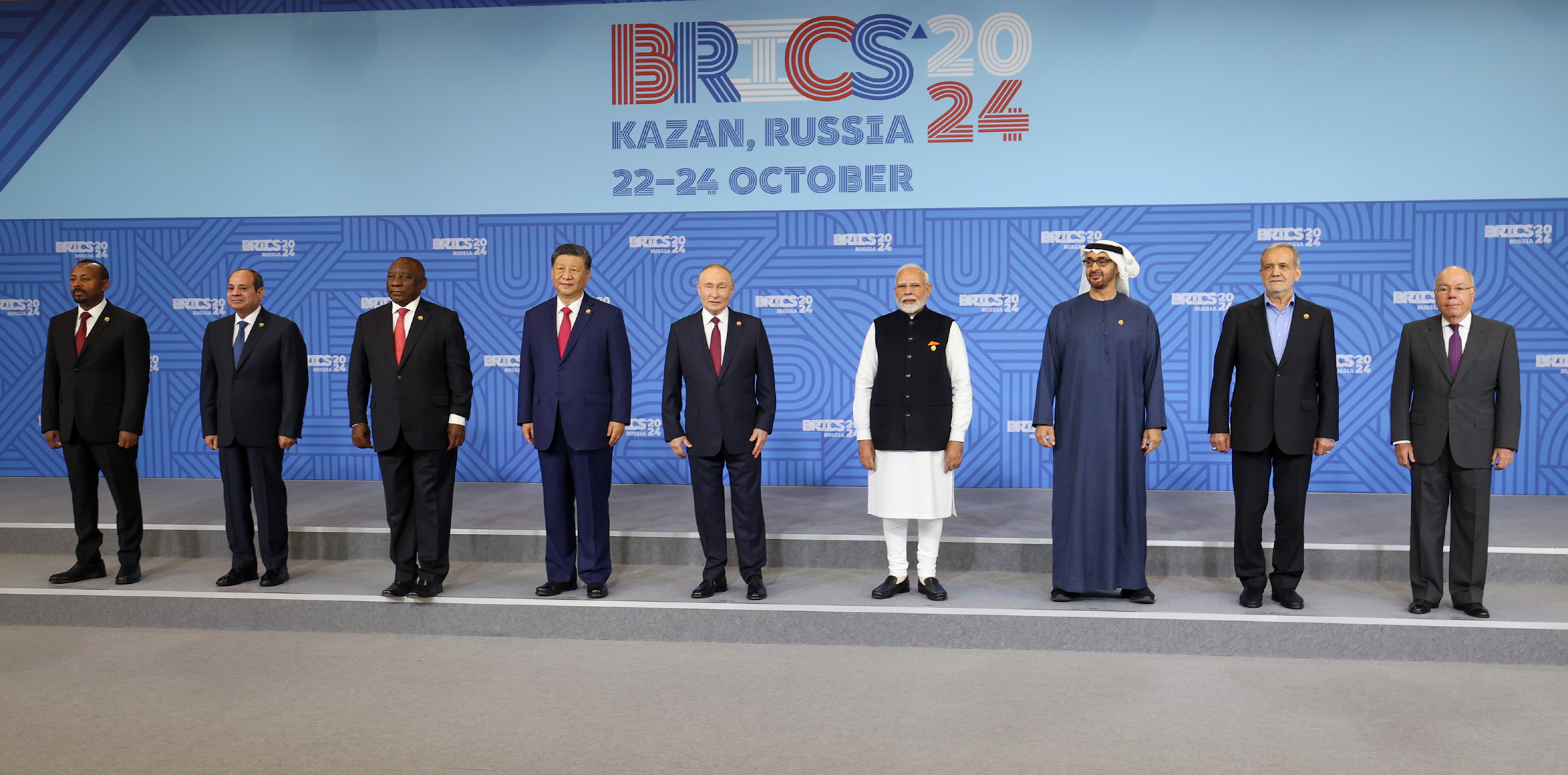
UAE President Mohamed bin Zayed at the 16th BRICS summit in October 2024

Gulf Arab states, including the United Arab Emirates, showed interest in engaging with the Syrian transitional government to promote political transition and address regional concerns following the fall of the Assad regime. Additionally, the UAE leadership see the change in Syria as an opportunity to undermine Iranian influence in the Levant. The hope is to help push Iran out of Syria and cut its pathways between Iraq and Lebanon.

The UAE is the primary supporter of the rebel Rapid Support Forces (RSF) in the ongoing Sudanese Civil War. In 2025, multiple reports exposed the UAE for supplying the RSF with weapons, in violation of international sanctions, and used to commit genocide in the region. On 6 March 2025, Sudan filed a case against the UAE at the International Court of Justice, accusing the UAE of complicity in genocide by supporting the RSF, which are alleged to have committed atrocities against the Masalit people in Darfur. In late 2025, the fall of El Fasher to the RSF led to widespread massacres and intensified global scrutiny of the UAE for its role in supporting the paramilitary group.

Joining US Senator Chris Van Hollen, United States Congress has pushed for an export ban of weapons to the UAE. As of November 2025, the bill remained in Congress.

=== Military ===
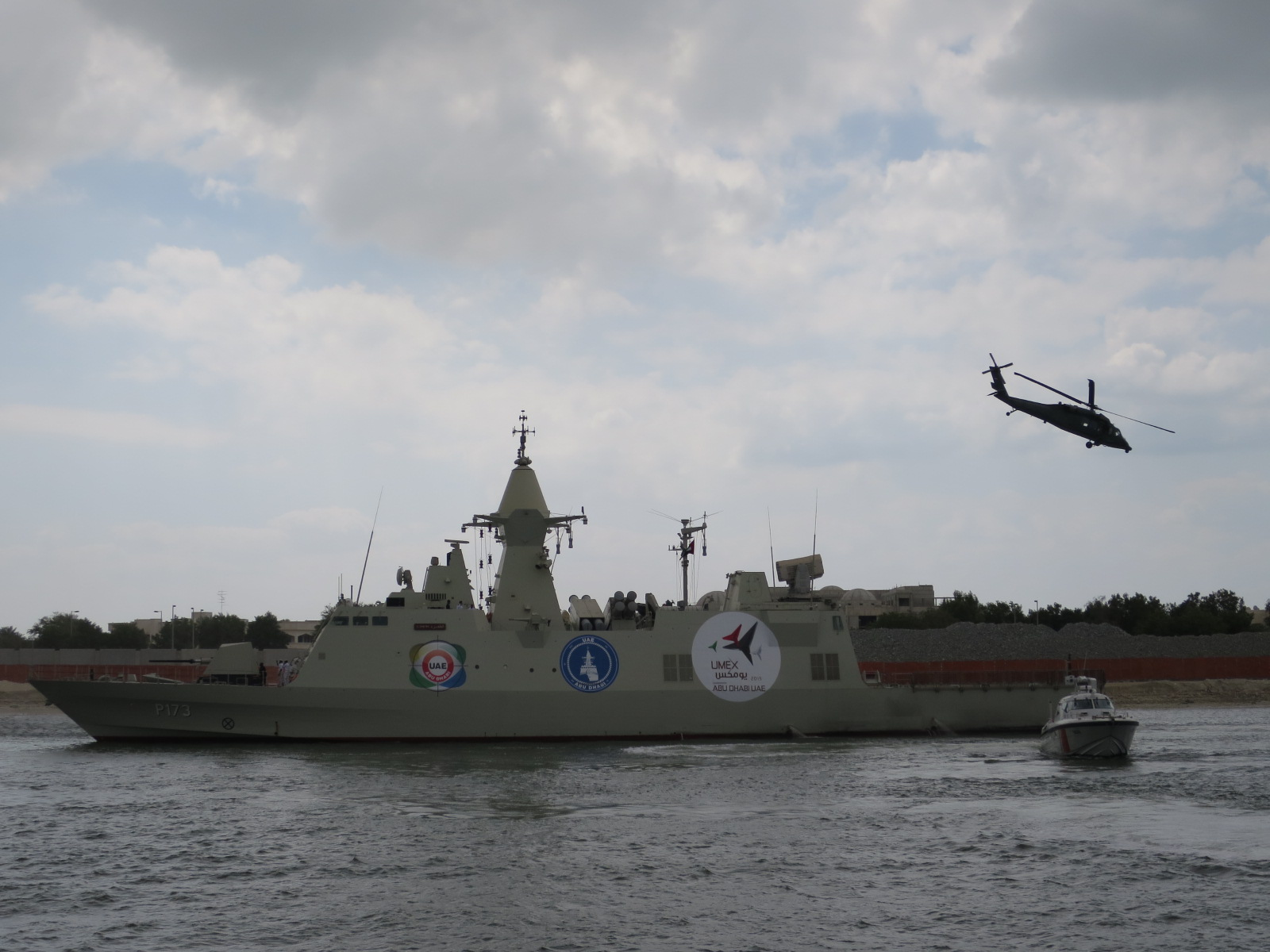
Baynunah-class corvette of the United Arab Emirates Navy

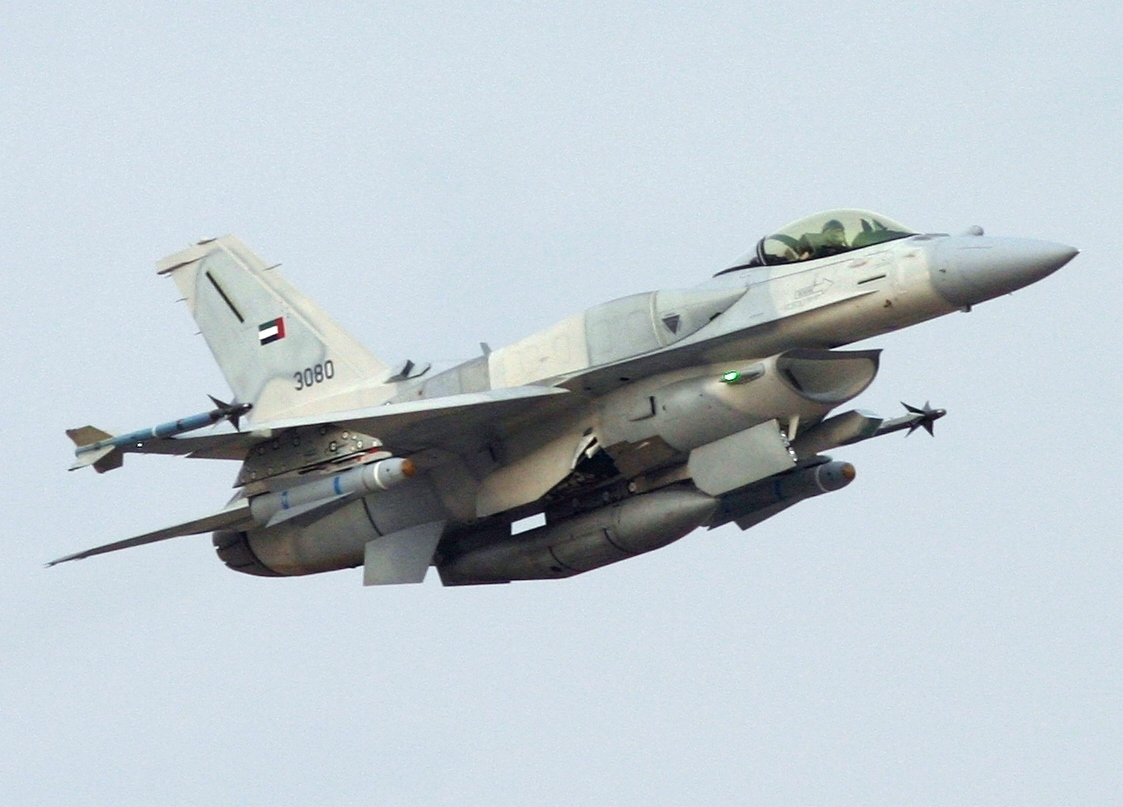
F-16 Desert Falcon of the United Arab Emirates Air Force

The armed forces of the United Arab Emirates consist of 44,000 active personnel in the Army, 2,500 personnel and 46 ships in the Navy, 4,500 personnel and 386 aircraft in the Air Force, and 12,000 personnel in the Presidential Guard. In 2022 the country spent US$20.4 billion on defence, which is 4% of its GDP. The UAE is considered to have the most capable military among the Gulf states.

Although initially small in number, the UAE armed forces have grown significantly over the years and are presently equipped with some of the most modern weapon systems, purchased from a variety of western military advanced countries, mainly France, the US, and the UK. Most officers are graduates of the United Kingdom's Royal Military Academy at Sandhurst, with others having attended the United States Military Academy at West Point, the Royal Military College, Duntroon in Australia, and St Cyr, the military academy of France. France and the United States have played the most strategically significant roles with defence cooperation agreements and military material provision.

Some of the UAE military deployments include an infantry battalion to the United Nations UNOSOM II force in Somalia in 1993, the 35th Mechanised Infantry Battalion to Kosovo, a regiment to Kuwait during the Iraq War, demining operations in Lebanon, Operation Enduring Freedom in Afghanistan, American-led intervention in Libya, American-led intervention in Syria, and the Saudi-led intervention in Yemen. The active and effective military role, despite its small active personnel, has led the UAE military to be nicknamed as "Little Sparta" by United States Armed Forces Generals and former US defence secretary James Mattis.

The UAE intervened in the Libyan Civil War in support of General Khalifa Haftar's Libyan National Army in its conflict with the internationally recognised Government of National Accord (GNA).

Examples of the military assets deployed include the enforcement of the no-fly-zone over Libya by sending six UAEAF F-16 and six Mirage 2000 multi-role fighter aircraft, ground troop deployment in Afghanistan, 30 UAEAF F-16s and ground troops deployment in Southern Yemen, and helping the US launch its first airstrikes against ISIL targets in Syria.

The UAE has begun production of a greater amount of military equipment, in a bid to reduce foreign dependence and help with national industrialisation. Example of national military development include the Abu Dhabi Shipbuilding company (ADSB), which produces a range of ships and is a prime contractor in the Baynunah Programme, a programme to design, develop, and produce corvettes customised for operation in the shallow waters of the Persian Gulf. The UAE is also producing weapons and ammunition through Caracal International, military transport vehicles through Nimr LLC, and unmanned aerial vehicles collectively through Emirates Defence Industries Company. The UAE operates the General Dynamics F-16 Fighting Falcon F-16E Block 60 unique variant unofficially called "Desert Falcon", developed by General Dynamics in collaboration with the UAE and specifically for the United Arab Emirates Air Force. The United Arab Emirates Army operates a customised Leclerc tank and is the only other operator of the tank aside from the French Army. The largest defence exhibition and conference in the Middle East, International Defence Exhibition, takes place biennially in Abu Dhabi.

The UAE introduced a mandatory military service for adult males, since 2014, for 16 months to expand its reserve force. The highest loss of life in the history of UAE military occurred in the 2015 Marib attack on Friday 4 September 2015, in which 52 soldiers were killed in Marib area of central Yemen by a Tochka missile launched by the Houthis which targeted a weapons cache and caused a large explosion.

=== Law ===
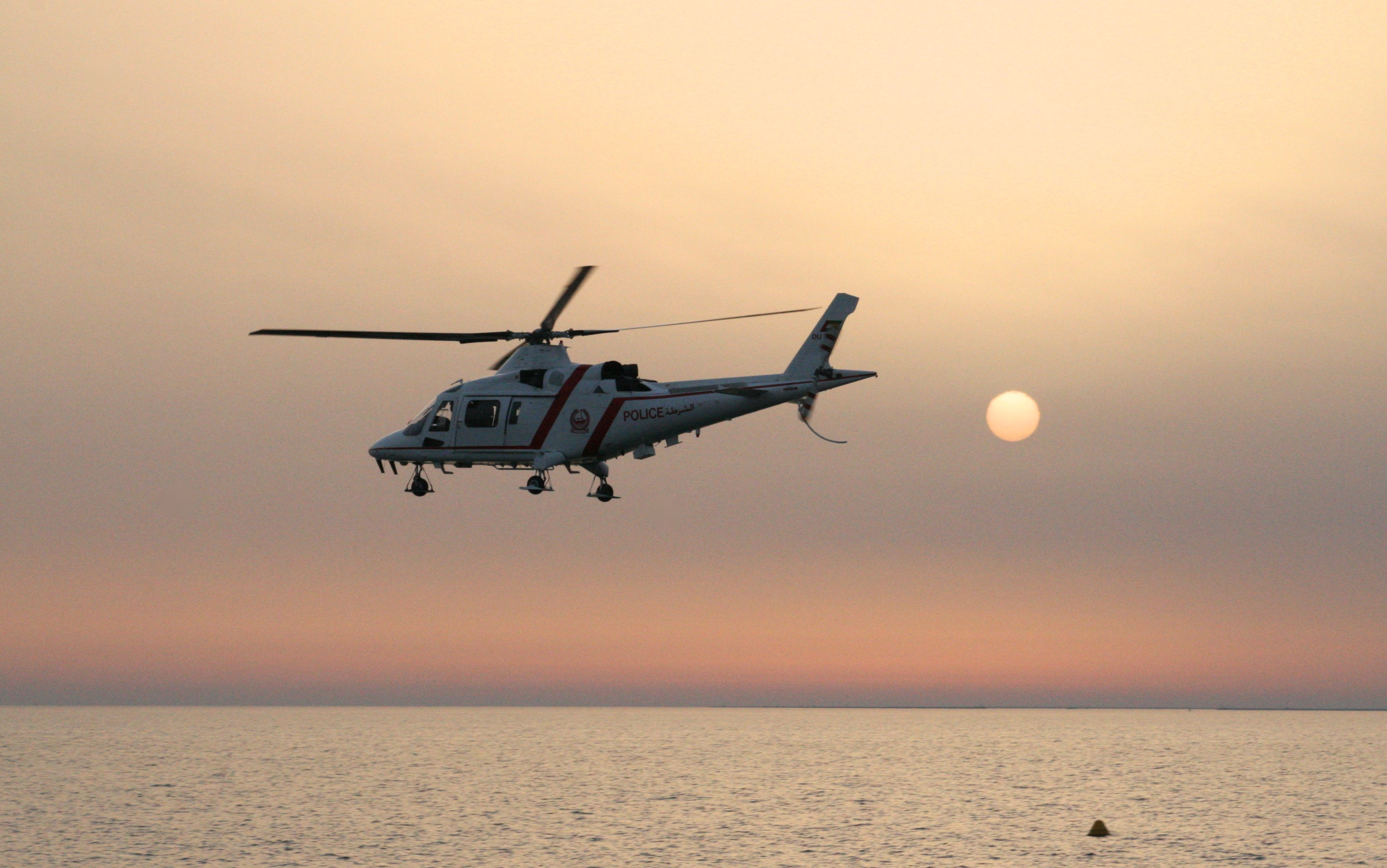
Dubai Police helicopter flying at sunset

The United Arab Emirates has a federal court system, and the emirates of Abu Dhabi, Dubai, and Ras Al Khaimah also have local court systems. The UAE's judicial system is derived from the civil law system and Sharia law. The court system consists of civil courts and Sharia courts. Sharia courts have exclusive jurisdiction in Muslim family law matters, while civil courts deal with all other legal matters. Since September 2020, corporal punishment is no longer a legal form of punishment under UAE federal law. Under the decree, legal forms of punishment are retribution and blood money payments, capital punishment, life imprisonment, temporary imprisonment, indefinite detention, and fines. Article 1 of the Federal Penal Code was amended in 2020 to state that Islamic Law applies only to retribution and blood money punishments; previously the article stated that "provisions of the Islamic Law shall apply to the crimes of doctrinal punishment, punitive punishment and blood money." Before 2020, flogging, stoning, amputation, and crucifixion were technically legal punishments for criminal offences such as adultery, premarital sex, and drug or alcohol use. In recent history, the UAE has declared its intention to move towards a more tolerant legal code, and to phase out corporal punishment altogether in favour of private punishment. With alcohol and cohabitation laws being loosened in advance of the 2020 World Expo, Emirati laws have become increasingly acceptable to visitors from non-Muslim countries.

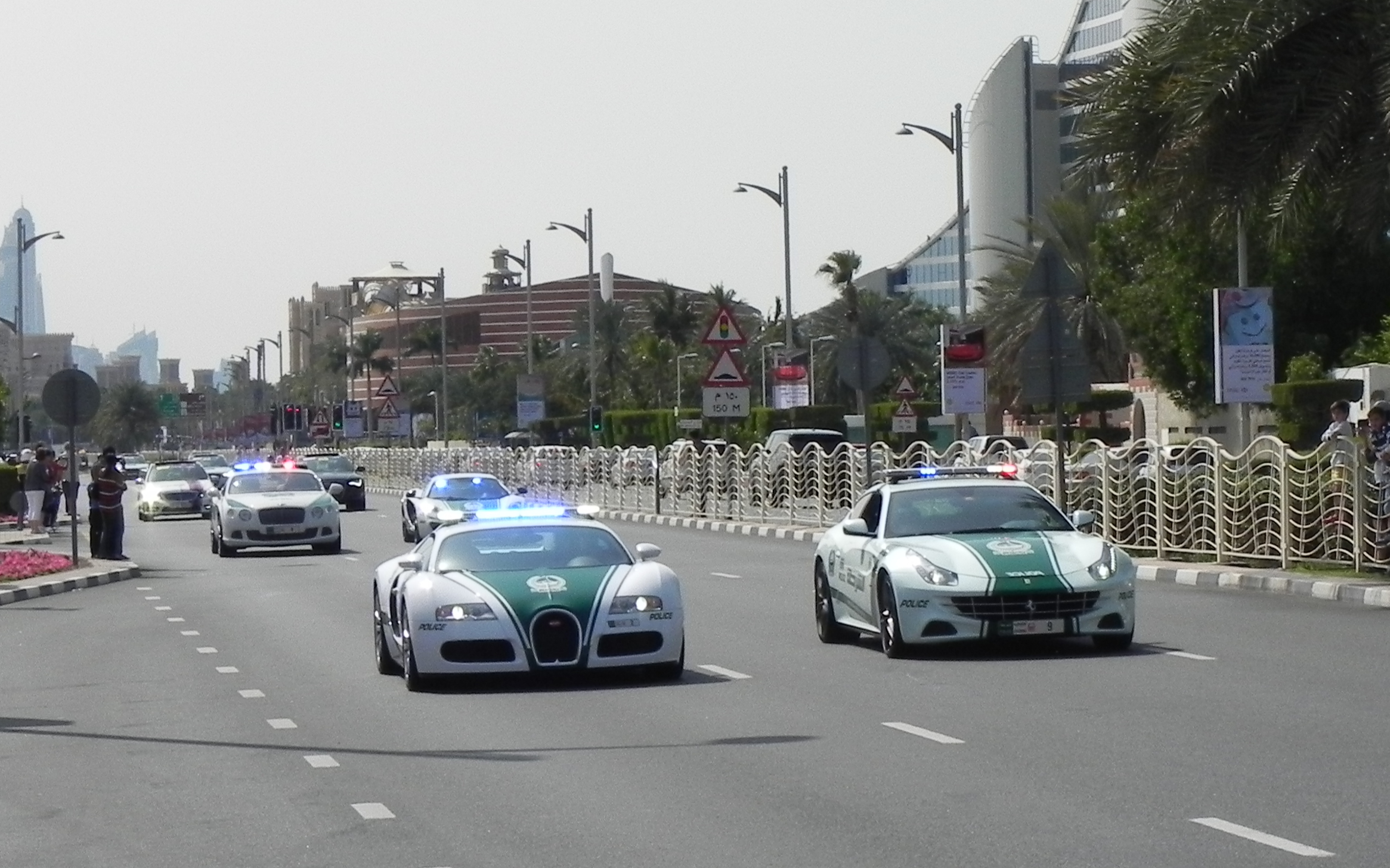
Dubai Police super-car motorcade at Jumeirah Road

Sharia courts have exclusive jurisdiction over Muslim family law matters such as marriage, divorce, child custody, and inheritance. Muslim women must receive permission from a male guardian to marry and remarry. This requirement is derived from Sharia law and has been federal law since 2005. It is illegal for Muslim women to marry non-Muslims and is punishable by law. Non-Muslim expatriates were liable to Sharia rulings on marriage, divorce, child custody, and inheritance, however, federal law was changed to introduce non-Sharia personal status law for non-Muslims. Recently, the emirate of Abu Dhabi opened a civil law family court for non-Muslims and Dubai has announced that non-Muslims can opt for civil marriages.

Apostasy is a technically capital crime in the UAE, however, there are no documented cases of apostates being executed. Blasphemy is illegal; expatriates involved in insulting Islam are liable for deportation.

Sodomy is illegal and is punishable by a minimum of 6-month imprisonment or a fine or both, but the law does not apply "except on the basis of a complaint from the husband or legal guardian", but the penalty may be suspended if the complaint is waived. In 2013, an Emirati man was on trial for being accused of a "gay handshake".

Due to local customs, public shows of affection in certain public places are illegal and could result in deportation, but holding hands is tolerated. Expats in Dubai have been deported for kissing in public. In several cases, the courts of the UAE have jailed women who have reported rape. (Note: Attributed to multiple sources:) Federal law in the UAE prohibits swearing on social media. Dancing in public is illegal in the UAE. In November 2020, UAE announced that it decriminalised alcohol, lifted the ban on unmarried couples living together, and ended lenient punishment on honor killing. Foreigners living in the Emirates were allowed to follow their native country's laws on divorce and inheritance.

Despite the Sharia laws that restrict gambling tools and machines in the UAE, the country granted its first commercial gaming operator's licence to Wynn Resorts that was developing a luxury resort, including a 224,000 ft^{2} (20,800 m^{2}) casino component, at Al Marjan Island in Ras Al Khaimah. In September 2023, the UAE established the General Commercial Gaming Regulatory Authority (GCGRA), hinting towards its plans to legalise gambling. The GCGRA has outlined a comprehensive framework that includes licenses for casinos, slot machines, and poker tables, as well as lotteries, internet gaming, and sports wagering. The GCGRA emphasises responsible gaming, requiring operators to implement socially responsible gaming programmes and undergo audits every two years. These programmes include player education, responsible marketing, employee training, and evaluation plans to measure their effectiveness. Gaming operators must have a "qualifying domestic entity" in the UAE, defined as any UAE company with substantial business operations in the jurisdiction. The GCGRA also mandates player management tools, including deposit limits and cooling-off periods for online gaming.

The first lottery license has been granted to The Game LLC, operating under the banner of the 'UAE Lottery'. This move supersedes existing lottery operators like Mahzooz and Big Ticket, which are no longer legally permitted to offer their services. Players are required to engage only with licensed gaming operators to avoid severe penalties. The regulations also specify that operators must enable players to restrict themselves from online gaming platforms for a period of at least 72 hours upon request. This is part of the broader initiative to ensure a secure and responsible commercial gaming environment in the UAE.

The UAE's move to legalise gaming is seen as a strategic step to enhance its tourism and entertainment sector, leveraging its existing infrastructure and business-friendly environment. This development is expected to attract major gaming operators and contribute significantly to the country's economy.

The country does not have any formal gaming laws, and therefore the project details about the casino were not completely made public. Local citizens are not permitted for gambling, which remains a legal and cultural taboo.

=== Human rights violations ===
Human Rights Watch has reported on the country's ongoing unfair mass trials, restrictions of freedom of speech and abuses to migrant labour forces. The annual Freedom House report on Freedom in the World has listed the United Arab Emirates as "Not Free" every year since 1999, the first year for which records are available on their website. In 2025, the country ranked 18 out of 100 in terms of the freedom index, due to a lack of free elections, lack of government transparency and accountability, and a lack of free media and independent judicial system, and low scores against other metrics.

Freedom of association is also severely curtailed, and in most cases, banned under existing law. In the UAE an association requires twenty individuals, none of which can have previous convictions and must be preauthorized and registered with the government. All associations have to be submitted to censorship guidelines and all publications have first to be approved by the government. Updated in 2022, article 188 in the Penal Code makes the establishment of an association with the intended goal of challenging the existing regime punishable by life imprisonment or the death penalty. In its 2025 Annual Report, Amnesty International has continuously identified severe human rights violations, particularly against freedom of assembly, freedom speech and an uptick in arbitrary arrest and torture.

Immigrant workers are often subject to harsh forms of the law within the country, and are often victims of arbitrary detention or torture within the country. One notable example is Ryan Cornelius, a 71-year-old British citizen who has been unlawfully detained in the UAE since 2008. The Arab Organization for Human Rights obtained testimonies from defendants who claimed being kidnapped, tortured and abused in detention centres; they reported sixteen methods of torture including beatings, threats with electrocution and denial of medical care. Repressive measures, including deportation, were applied on foreigners based on allegations of attempts to destabilize the country. The issue of sexual abuse among female domestic workers is another area of concern, particularly given that domestic servants are not covered by the UAE labour law of 1980 or the draft labour law of 2007. Additionally, the kafala system, or sponsorship for work results in a significant cost to migrant workers and conditions comparable to indentured servitude. Protests by foreign workers have been suppressed, and protesters imprisoned without due process; including in 2008, 2012, and most recently in 2023.

The state security apparatus in the UAE has been accused of human rights abuses including forced disappearance, arbitrary arrests and torture. In a mass trial in 2013, human rights activist and lawyer, Salim al-Shehhi claimed he was held in solitary confinement and forced to give a confession to crimes he was accused of. In 2023, the country held its largest mass trial where defendants were not given fair treatment. Beginning in December 2023, a trial with 84 defendants resulted in 43 people sentenced to life in prison, ten received sentences up to fifteen years for peaceful protests against the government. Those convicted were Bangladeshi individuals in the UAE, protesting their home government, while the UAE claimed the defendants were a part of a terrorist organization. The trial took place in secrecy with no documents or evidence provided in the court. In January 2025, Human Rights Watch (HRW) published a report highlighting the human rights abuses committed by the UAE in 2024, majorly focusing on the unfair mass trial, where the UAE's use of Federal Penal Code and the Cybercrime Law were used to silence government critics, journalists, dissidents and activists, while restricting their freedom of expression.

A December 2024 report by European Centre for Democracy and Human Rights (ECDHR) highlights the country's acute issue with unlawful, political persecution and absence of judicial independence. Trials are often held in secrecy and the defendants' lawyers are neglected from accessing case files and court documents. The UAE's 2014 Counter-Terrorism Law is used to enforce travel bans, life imprisonment and even death penalty for peaceful critics of the regime and those managing an organization. The UAE's counterterrorism law represses freedom of expression. The country's judicial system lacks any form of transparency or independence, and international organizations have called on the UN to form an independent committee to review all allegations of torture, incommunicado detention, and unfair trials.

Investigations have found that Qatari men have been abducted by the UAE government and allegedly withheld information about the men's fate from their families. Over 4,000 Shia expatriates have been deported from the UAE; including Lebanese Shia families for their alleged sympathies for Hezbollah. In 2013, 94 Emirati activists were held in secret detention centres and put on trial for allegedly attempting to overthrow the government; a relative of a defendant was arrested for tweeting about the trial, and sentenced to 10 months in jail. The latest forced disappearance involves three sisters from Abu Dhabi.

As a response to their poor human rights records, the government of the UAE has tried to strengthen relations with a number of western private and public entities through whitewashing, to improve their public image. They established a Soft Power Council in 2017 in order to address their international image. The UAE deploys a number of these techniques, including gender-washing, green-washing and sports-washing; as evident in hosting major events like COP28, sporting events including Formula One races, the Abu Dhabi Cup in 2026; or promoting tourism and business to Dubai. The growing interest in playing a role in the international entertainment industriy is an attempt to scour the country's image of its ongoing human rights violations. They continue to face criticism for its ongoing contribution to climate change and human rights abuses, despite participating in these international events. In 2018, the country hosted the Second Annual World Tolerance Summit, which was protested by a number of NGOs and scholars.

=== Migrant workers ===
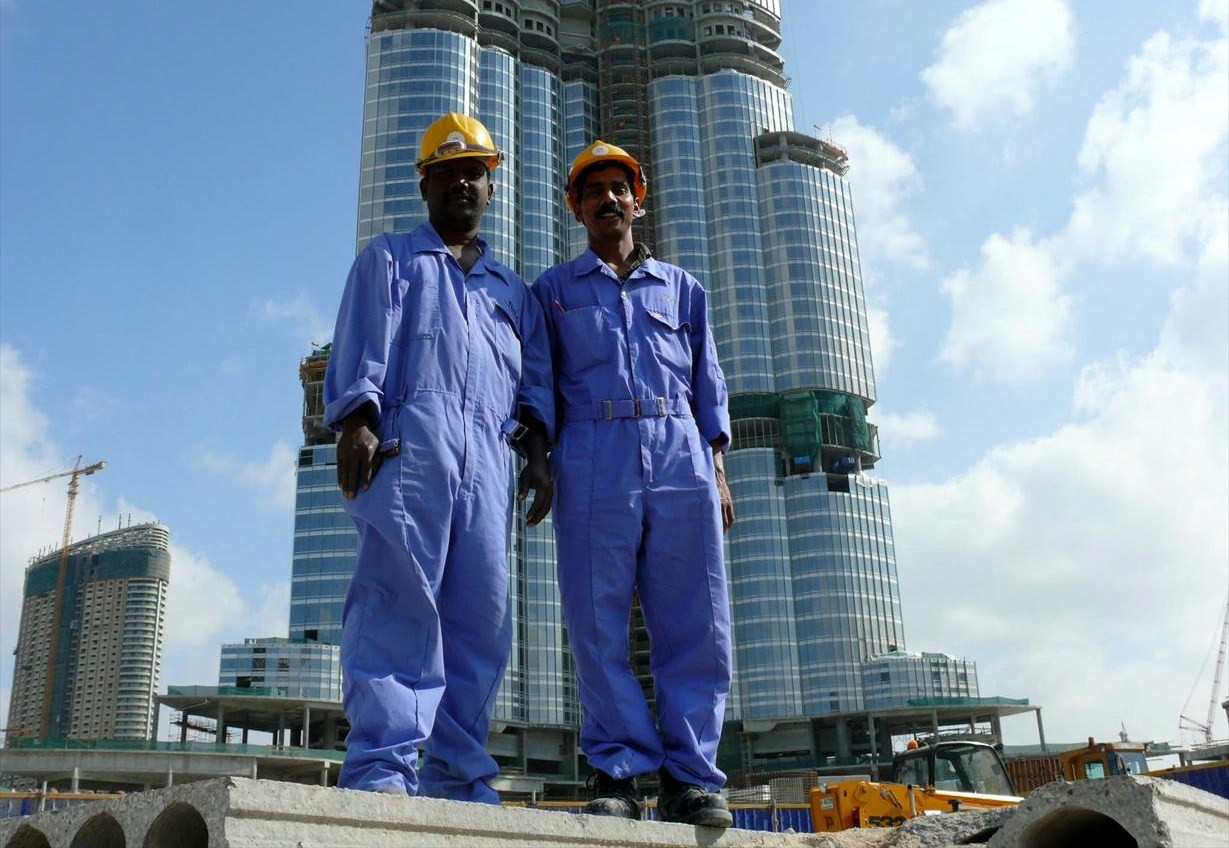
Two South Asian blue-collar workers posing for a picture with the Burj Khalifa on the background

Migrant workers in the UAE are not allowed to join trade unions or go on strike. Those who strike may risk prison and deportation, as seen in 2014 when dozens of workers were deported for striking. The International Trade Union Confederation has called on the United Nations to investigate evidence that thousands of migrant workers in the UAE are treated as slave labour.

In 2019, an investigation performed by The Guardian revealed that thousands of migrant construction workers employed on infrastructure and building projects for the UAE's Expo 2020 exhibition were working in an unsafe environment. Some were even exposed to potentially fatal situations due to cardiovascular issues. Long hours in the sun made them vulnerable to heat strokes.

A report in January 2020 highlighted that the employers in the United Arab Emirates have been exploiting the Indian labour and hiring them on tourist visas, which is easier and cheaper than work permits. These migrant workers are left open to labour abuse, where they also fear reporting exploitation due to their illegal status. Besides, the issue remains unknown as the visit visa data is not maintained in both the UAE and Indian migration and employment records.

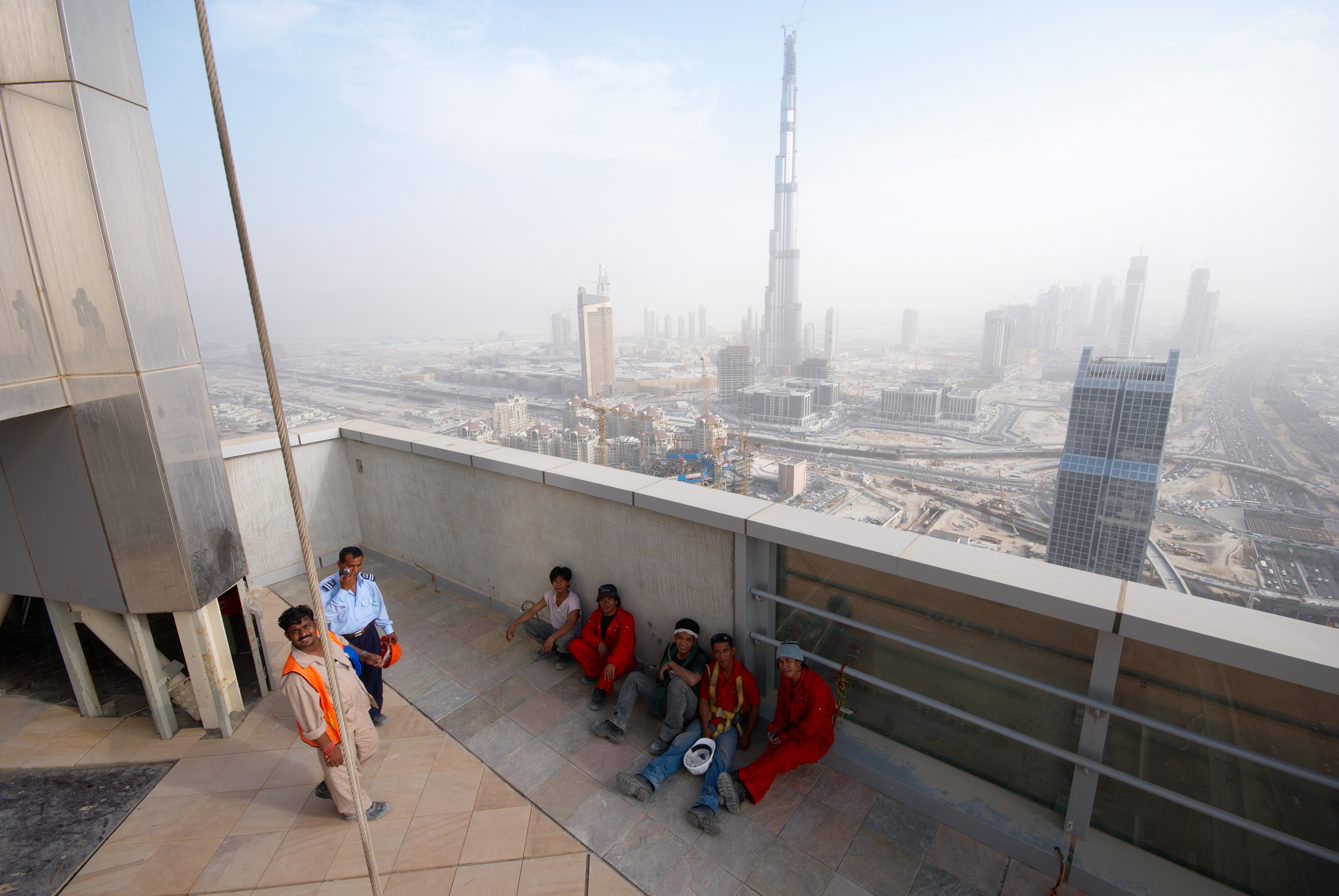
Dubai construction workers having a lunch break

In a 22 July 2020 news piece, Reuters reported human rights groups as saying conditions had deteriorated because of the COVID-19 pandemic. Many migrant workers racked up debt and depended on the help of charities. The report cited salary delays and layoffs as a major risk, in addition to overcrowded living conditions, lack of support and problems linked with healthcare and sick pay. Reuters reported at least 200,000 workers, mostly from India but also from Pakistan, Bangladesh, the Philippines and Nepal, had been repatriated, according to their diplomatic missions.

On 2 May 2020, the Consul General of India in Dubai, Vipul, confirmed that more than 150,000 Indians in the United Arab Emirates registered to be repatriated through the e-registration option provided by Indian consulates in the UAE. According to the figures, 25% of applicants lost their jobs and nearly 15% were stranded in the country due to lockdown. Besides, 50% of the total applicants were from the state of Kerala, India.

On 9 October 2020, The Telegraph reported that many migrant workers were left abandoned, as they lost their jobs amidst the tightening economy due to COVID-19.

Various human rights organisations have raised serious concerns about the alleged abuse of migrant workers by major contractors organising Expo 2020. UAE's business solution provider German Pavilion is also held accountable for abusing migrant workers.

=== Environmental policy ===
Environmental issues in the United Arab Emirates are caused by the exploitation of natural resources, rapid population growth, and high energy demand. Climate change contributes to UAE's water scarcity, drought, and rising sea level. The country is a leading oil and gas producer. Its energy consumption per capita is around 370 Gigajoule. The UAE's carbon dioxide emissions per capita are high, ranking sixth among countries globally. Recently, it made efforts to make itself more sustainable. Those include:

- Setting a target to reduce GHG emissions by 31% in comparison to business scenario by 2030 and reach net zero by 2050.
- Launching a programme to make the 3 most emissions-intensive sectors, 40% more energy efficient.
- Launching some programmes related to green building. Retrofitting of 30,000 buildings alone, should cut 1 million tons emissions.
- Promoting public transport and more.

According to official sources, in Dubai, "the share of mass transport in people's mobility increased from 6 per cent in 2006 to 20.61 per cent in 2022." Together with the USA the country invested 17 billion dollars in sustainable agriculture.

== Economy ==
Burj Khalifa, the tallest human-made structure in the world, located in Dubai

The United Arab Emirates has developed from a juxtaposition of Bedouin tribes to one of the world's wealthiest states in only about 50 years, boasting one of the highest GDP (PPP) per capita figures in the world. Economic growth has been impressive and steady throughout the history of this young confederation of emirates with brief periods of recessions only, e.g. in the global financial and economic crisis years 2008–09, and a couple of more mixed years starting in 2015 and persisting until 2019. Between 2000 and 2018, average real gross domestic product (GDP) growth was at close to 4%. It is the second largest economy in the GCC (after Saudi Arabia), with a nominal gross domestic product (GDP) of US$414.2 billion, and a real GDP of 392.8 billion constant 2010 USD in 2018. Since its independence in 1971, the UAE's economy has grown by nearly 231 times to 1.45 trillion AED in 2013. The non-oil trade has grown to 1.2 trillion AED, a growth by around 28 times from 1981 to 2012. Supported by the world's seventh-largest oil reserves and aided by prudent investments coupled with a resolute commitment to economic liberalism and strong governmental oversight, the UAE has witnessed its real GDP increase by more than three times over the past four decades. Presently, the UAE is among the wealthiest countries globally, with GDP per capita nearly 80% higher than the OECD average.

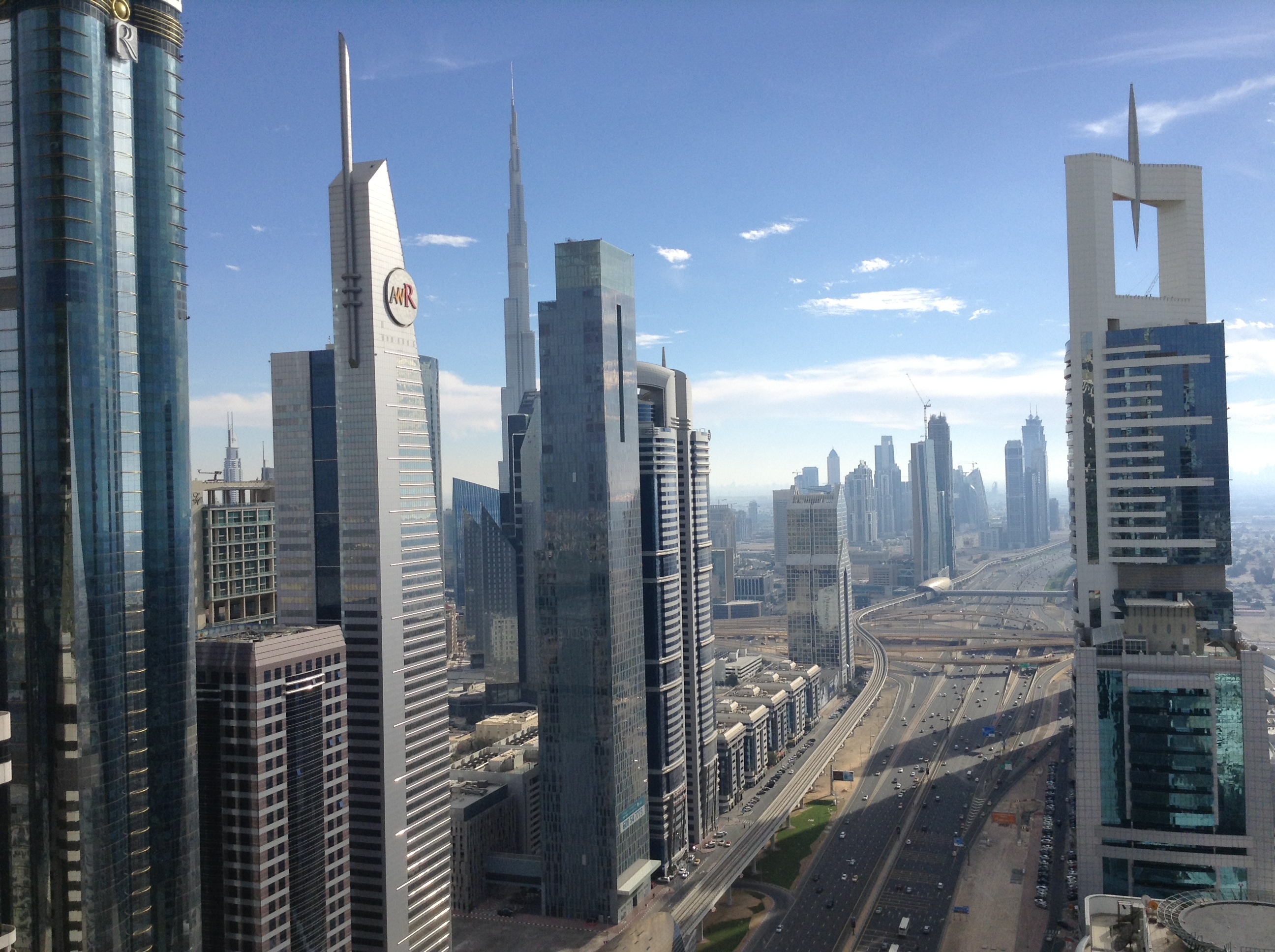
Dubai International Financial Centre

World Trade Center Abu Dhabi

As impressive as economic growth has been in the UAE, the total population has increased from just around 550,000 in 1975 to close to 10 million in 2018. This growth is mainly due to the influx of foreign workers into the country, making the national population a minority. The UAE features a unique labour market system, in which residence in the UAE is conditional on stringent visa rules. This system is a major advantage in terms of macroeconomic stability, as labour supply adjusts quickly to demand throughout economic business cycles. This allows the government to keep unemployment in the country on a very low level of less than 3%, and it also gives the government more leeway in terms of macroeconomic policies – where other governments often need to make trade-offs between fighting unemployment and fighting inflation.

Between 2014 and 2018, the accommodation and food, education, information and communication, arts and recreation, and real estate sectors overperformed in terms of growth, whereas the construction, logistics, professional services, public, and oil and gas sectors underperformed.

As for competitiveness, in June 2024 it was reported that the UAE has moved up three place to the 7th place among the top 10 countries in the IMD World Competitiveness. This ranking is issued by the World Competitiveness Centre of the Institute for Management Development (IMD) in Switzerland.

=== Business and finance ===
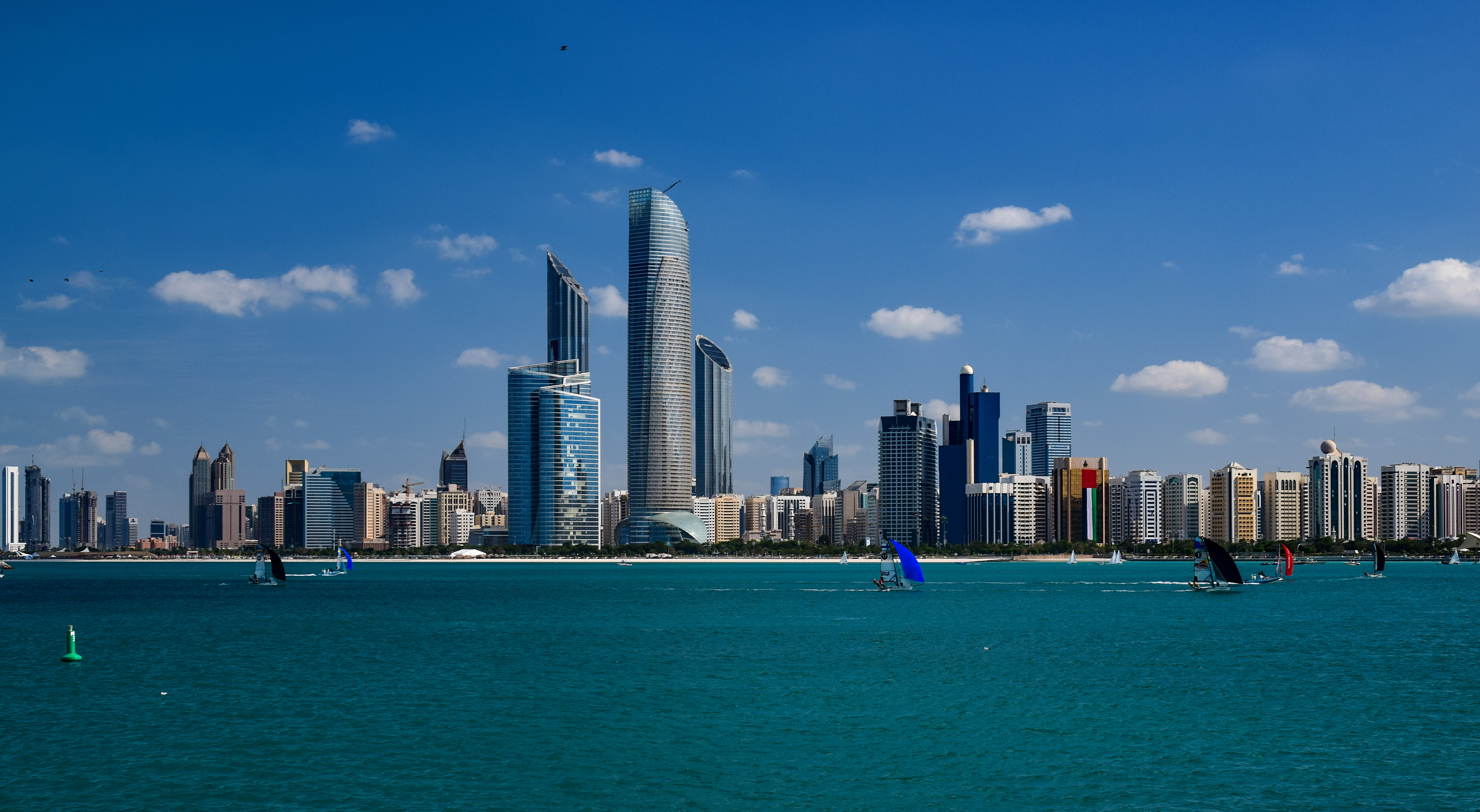
Abu Dhabi skyline

The UAE is ranked as the 26th best country in the world for doing business by the Doing Business 2017 Report published by the World Bank Group. The UAE are in the top ranks of several other global indices, such as the World Happiness Report (WHR) and 30th in the Global Innovation Index in 2025. The Economist Intelligence Unit (EIU) assigns the UAE rank two regionally in terms of business environment and 22 worldwide. From the 2018 Arab Youth Survey, the UAE emerges as the top Arab country in areas such as living, safety and security, economic opportunities, and starting a business, and as an example for other states to emulate.

The weaker points remain the level of education across the UAE population, limitations in the financial and labour markets, barriers to trade and some regulations that hinder business dynamism. The major challenge for the country, though, remains translating investments and strong enabling conditions into innovation and creative outputs.

UAE law does not allow trade unions to exist. The right to collective bargaining and the right to strike are not recognised, and the Ministry of Labour has the power to force workers to go back to work. Migrant workers who participate in a strike can have their work permits cancelled and be deported. Consequently, there are very few anti-discrimination laws in relation to labour issues, with Emiratis – and other GCC Arabs – getting preference in public sector jobs despite lesser credentials than competitors and lower motivation. In fact, just over eighty per cent of Emirati workers hold government posts, with many of the rest taking part in state-owned enterprises such as Dubai Properties and the airline Emirates. Western states, including the United Kingdom, were also warned by the Emirati Trade Minister, Thani bin Ahmed Al Zeyoudi, to keep politics separate from trade and the economy, as it dilutes the agreements' main objectives. In 2023, Al Zeyoudi indicated that these countries should "tone down" the human and workers' rights provisions in the trade deals, in order to gain greater market access and business opportunities.

The UAE's monetary policy stresses stability and predictability. The Central Bank of the UAE (CBUAE) keeps a peg to the US Dollar (USD) and moves interest rates close to the Federal Funds Rate.

According to Fitch Ratings, the decline in property sector follows risks of progressively worsening the quality of assets in possession with UAE banks, leading the economy to rougher times ahead. Even though as compared to retail and property, UAE banks fared well. The higher US interest rates followed since 2016 – which the UAE currency complies to – have boosted profitability. However, the likelihood of plunging interest rates and increasing provisioning costs on bad loans, point to difficult times ahead for the economy.

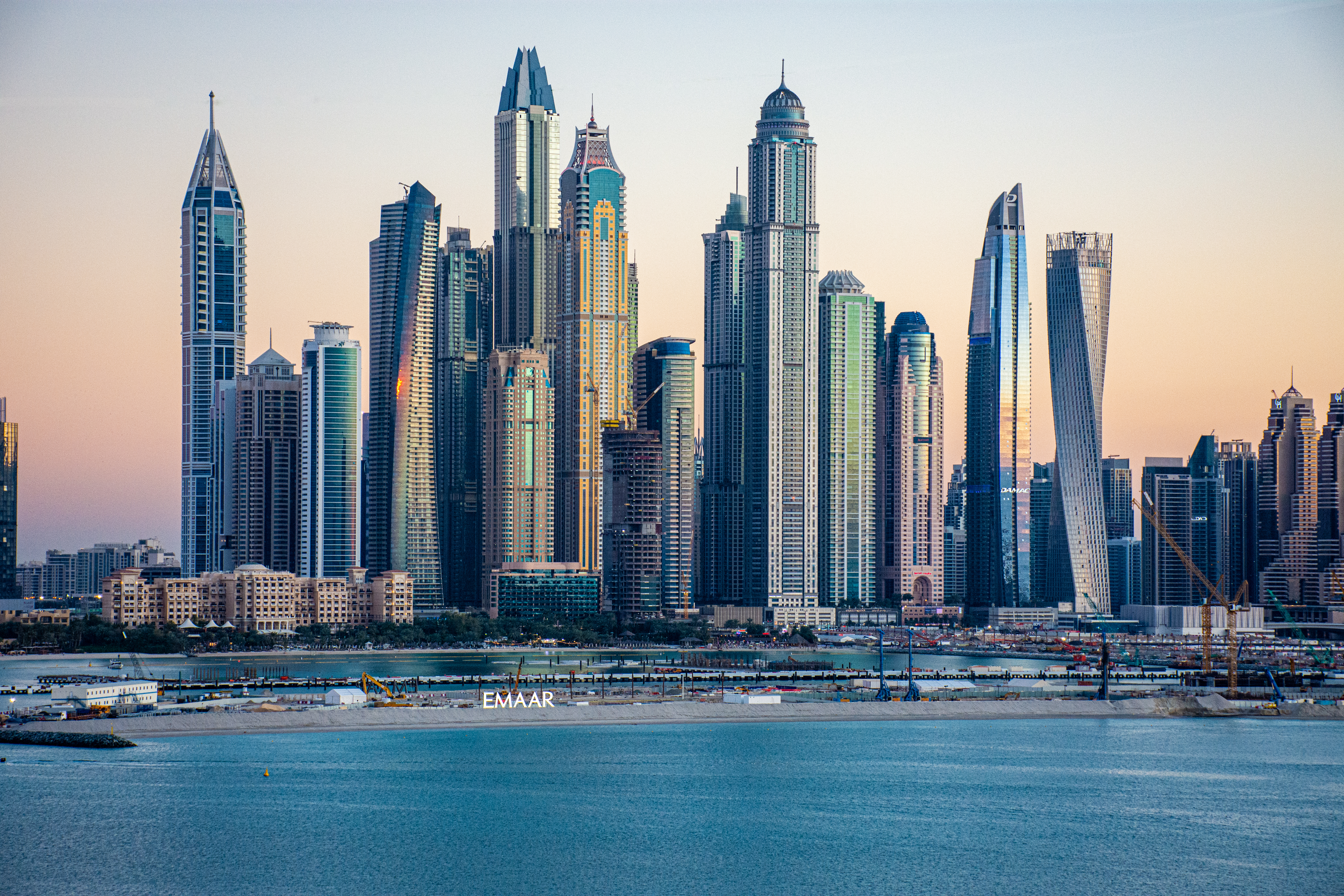
Dubai Marina skyline

Since 2015, economic growth has been more mixed due to a number of factors impacting both demand and supply. In 2017 and 2018, growth has been positive but on a low level of 0.8 and 1.4%, respectively. To support the economy, the government is currently following an expansionary fiscal policy. However, the effects of this policy are partially offset by monetary policy, which has been contractionary. If not for the fiscal stimulus in 2018, the UAE economy would probably have contracted in that year. One of the factors responsible for slower growth has been a credit crunch, which is due to, among other factors, higher interest rates. Government debt has remained on a low level, despite high deficits in a few recent years. Risks related to government debt remain low. Inflation has been picking up in 2017 and 2018. Contributing factors were the introduction of a value added tax (VAT) of 5% in 2018 as well as higher commodity prices. Despite the government's expansionary fiscal policy and a growing economy in 2018 and at the beginning of 2019, prices have been dropping in late 2018 and 2019 owing to oversupply in some sectors of importance to consumer prices.

The UAE has an attractive tax system for companies and wealthy individuals, making it a preferred destination for companies seeking tax avoidance. The NGO Tax Justice Network places them in 2021 in the group of the ten largest tax havens. In 2023, the UAE's legal system fell under international scrutiny, as the members of the British Parliament opened an inquiry into how the foreign business executives are treated in the country, in case of accusations of breaking the law.

2024 will be the third consecutive year that the UAE holds first place as the world's leading wealth magnet, as 6,700 wealthy migrants are set to move to the country.

=== VAT ===
The UAE government implemented value-added tax (VAT) in the country from 1 January 2018, at a standard rate of 5%. While the government may still adjust the exact arrangement of the VAT, it is not likely that any new taxes will be introduced in the foreseeable future. Additional taxes would destroy one of the UAE's main enticements for businesses to operate in the country and put a heavy burden on the economy.

=== Energy ===
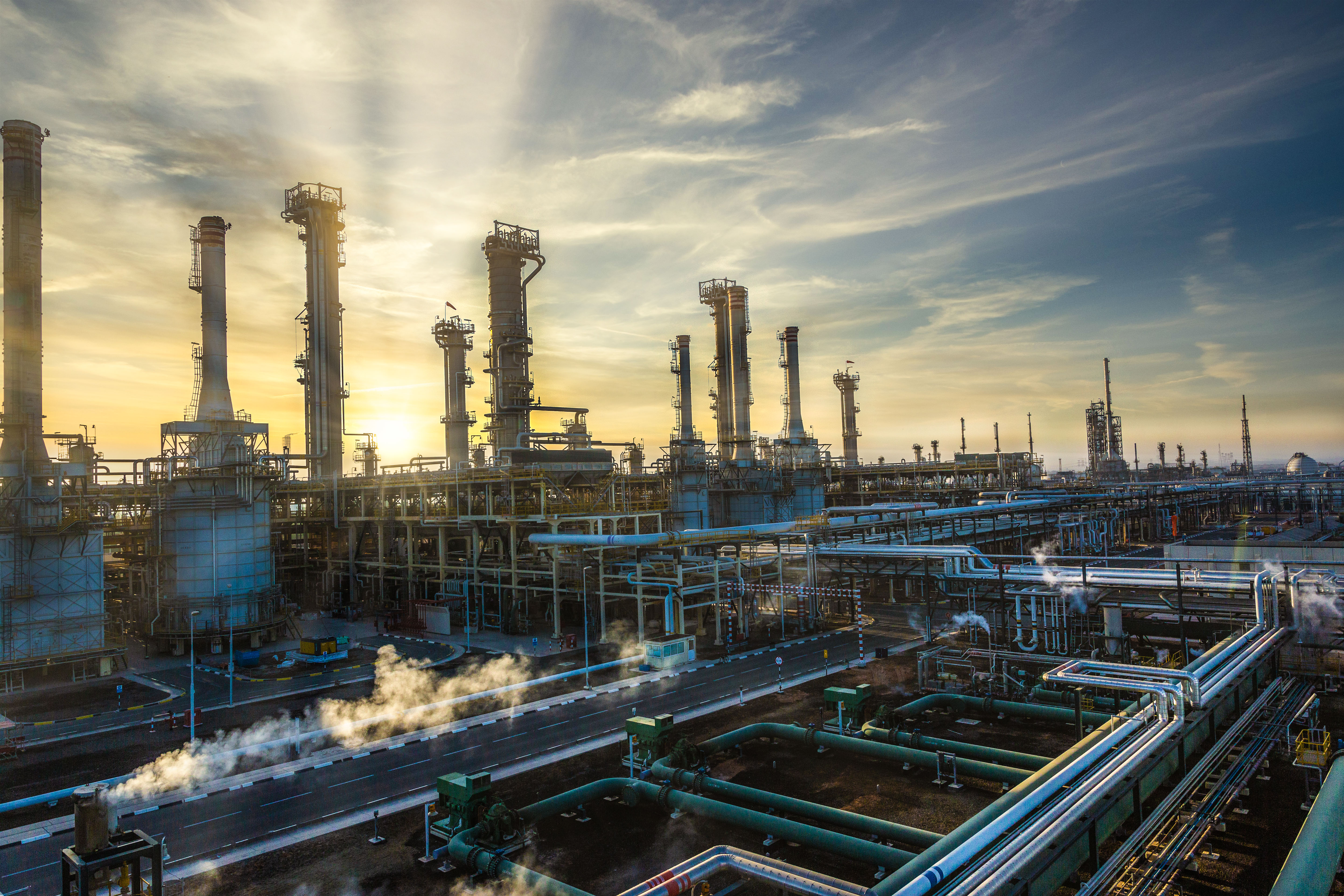
Ruwais Refinery is the fourth-largest single-site oil refinery in the world and the biggest in the Middle East.

Oil and gas production is an important part of the economy of the UAE. In 2018, the oil and gas sector contributed 26% to overall GDP. The UAE leadership initiated economic diversification efforts even before the oil price crash in the 1980s, resulting in the UAE having the most diversified economy in the Middle East and North Africa (MENA) region at present. Although the oil and gas sector continues to be significant to the UAE economy, these efforts have yielded great resilience during periods of oil price fluctuations and economic turbulence. The introduction of the VAT has provided the government with an additional source of income – approximately 6% of the total revenue in 2018, or 27 billion United Arab Emirates dirham (AED) – affording its fiscal policy more independence from oil- and gas-related revenue, which constitutes about 36% of the total government revenue.

The Barakah nuclear power plant is the first on the Arabian peninsula and expected to reduce the carbon footprint of the country.

The UAE has solar generation potential, and its energy policy has shifted due to the declining price of solar. The Dubai Clean Energy Strategy aims to provide 7 per cent of Dubai's energy from clean energy sources by 2020. It will increase this target to 25 per cent by 2030 and 75 per cent by 2050.

In 2023, ADNOC and its CEO Sultan Al Jaber closed at least 20 business deals worth nearly $100 billion. The state oil firm was alleged of exploiting the UAE's COP28 presidency to pursue oil and gas deals. As per leaked documents, Al Jaber's team targeted 16 nations to lobby firms, delegates or ministers on such deals. ADNOC sought deals with companies from 12 countries, which included 11 of the 16 target nations. Al Jaber and senior ADNOC officials openly discussed deals. COP28 organising teams were excluded from meetings and replaced by ADNOC officials, leaving a closed group that made deals.

=== Tourism ===
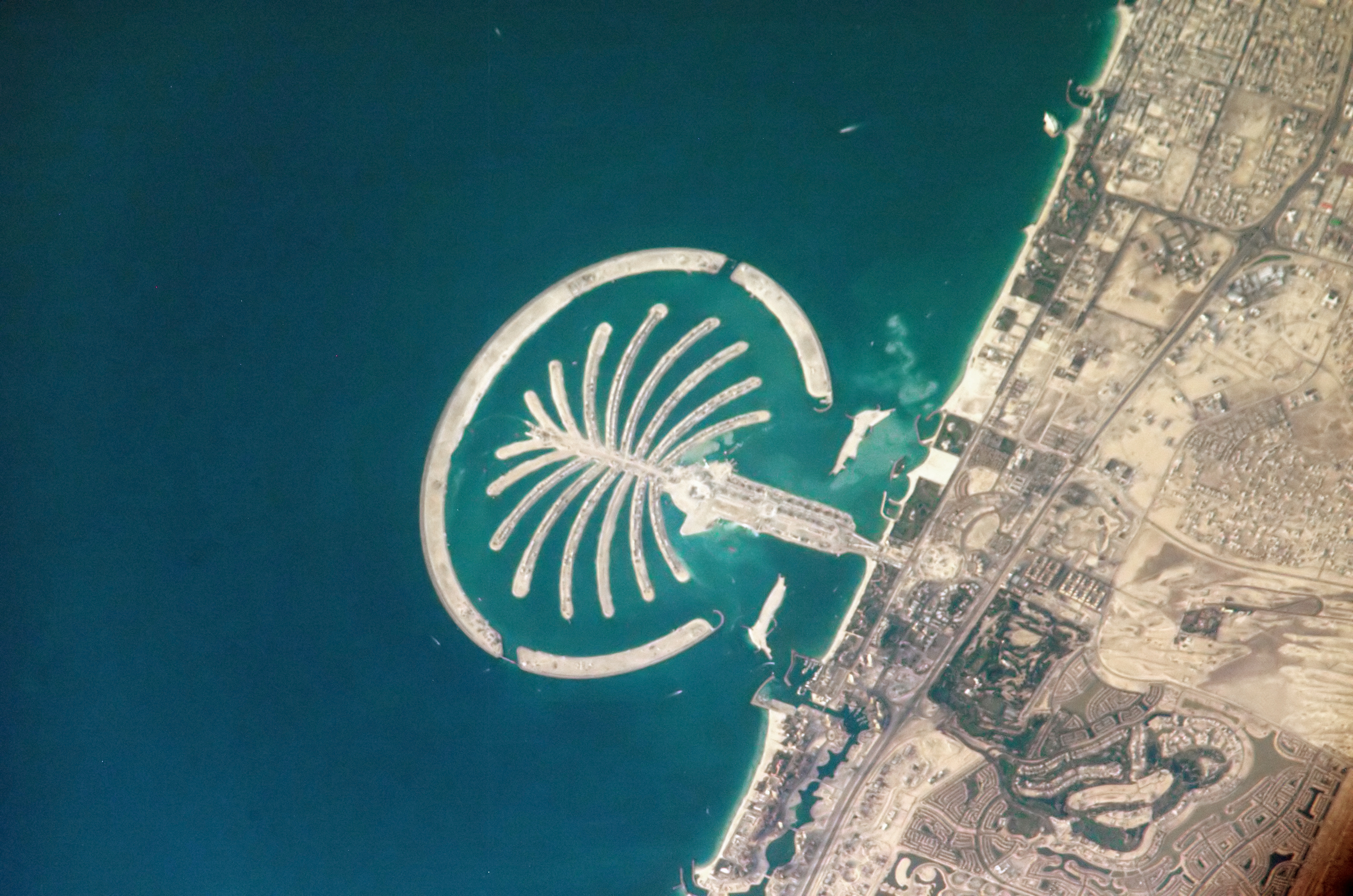
Palm Jumeirah in Dubai

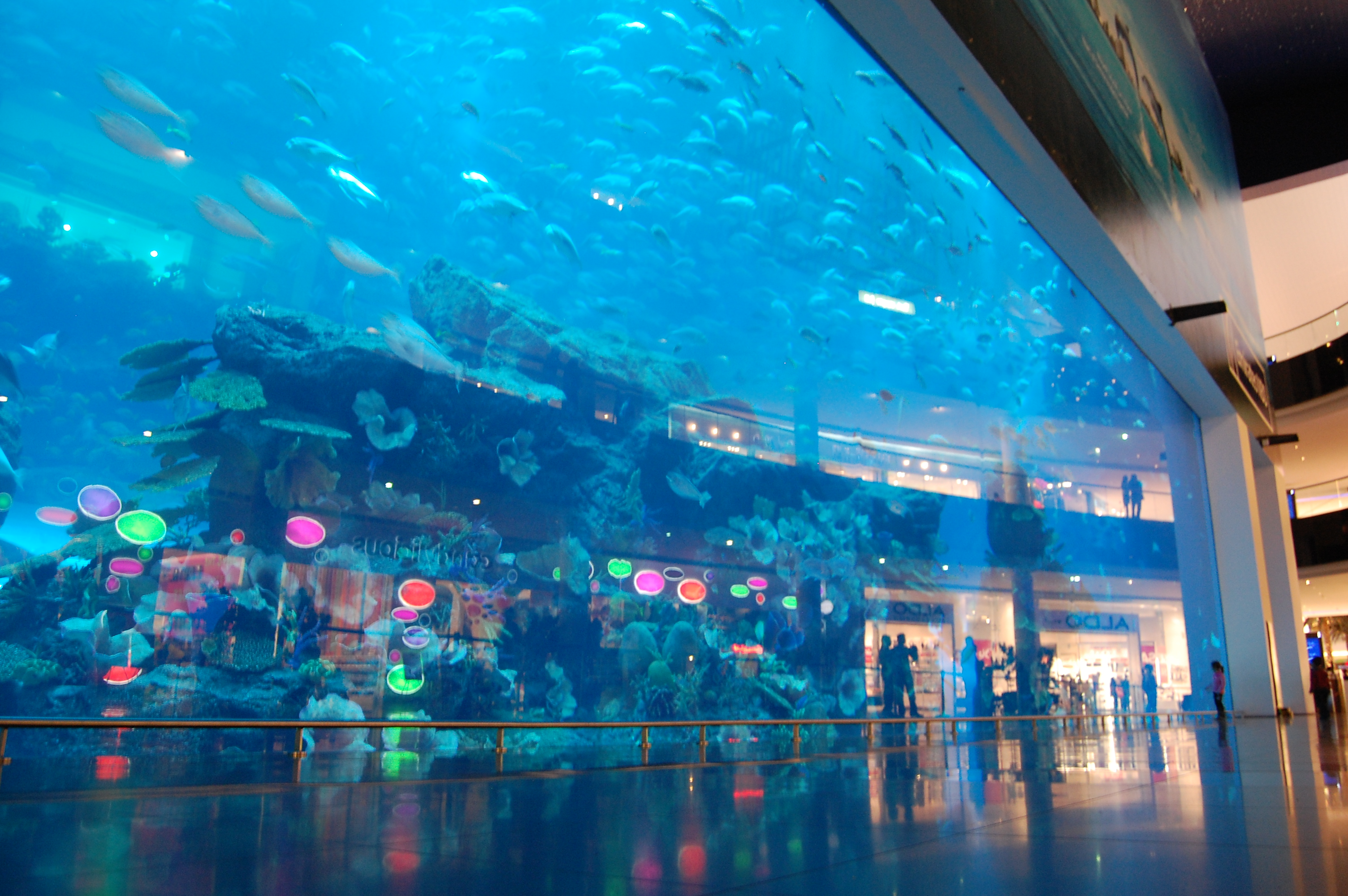
The Dubai Mall

Tourism acts as a growth sector for the entire UAE economy. Dubai is the top tourism destination in the Middle East. According to the annual MasterCard Global Destination Cities Index, Dubai is the fifth most popular tourism destination in the world. Dubai holds up to 66% share of the UAE's tourism economy, with Abu Dhabi having 16% and Sharjah 10%. Dubai welcomed 10 million tourists in 2013.

The UAE has the most advanced and developed infrastructure in the region. Since the 1980s, the UAE has been spending billions of dollars on infrastructure. These developments are particularly evident in the larger emirates of Abu Dhabi and Dubai. The northern emirates are rapidly following suit, providing major incentives for developers of residential and commercial property.

The inbound tourism expenditure in the UAE for 2019 accounted for 118.6 per cent share of the outbound tourism expenditure. Since 6 January 2020, tourist visas to the United Arab Emirates are valid for five years. It has been projected that the travel and tourism industry will contribute about 280.6 billion United Arab Emirati dirham to the UAE's GDP by 2028.

The country's major tourist attraction includes the famous Burj Khalifa in Dubai, the tallest tower in the world; The World archipelago and Palm Jumeirah also in Dubai; Sheikh Zayed Grand Mosque and Yas Marina Circuit in Abu Dhabi; Al Hajar Mountains in Fujairah. The uniqueness of the country's natural desert life, especially with the Bedouins, also facilitates the country's tourist industry.

The UAE will diversify its tourism sector with the introduction of casino gambling. Wynn Al Marjan Island in Ras Al Khaimah will feature the first casino in the country and will also be the country's first integrated resort when it opens in March 2027.

Abu Dhabi is set to become the home of Disneyland Abu Dhabi, the first Disney theme park in the Middle East.

=== Transport ===
Dubai International Airport became the busiest airport in the world by international passenger traffic in 2014, overtaking London Heathrow. Abu Dhabi International Airport is the second-largest airport in the UAE. Due to the announced expansion of Al Maktoum Airport on 28 April 2024, Dubai International Airport will be shut down once Al Maktoum Airport expansion will be completed.

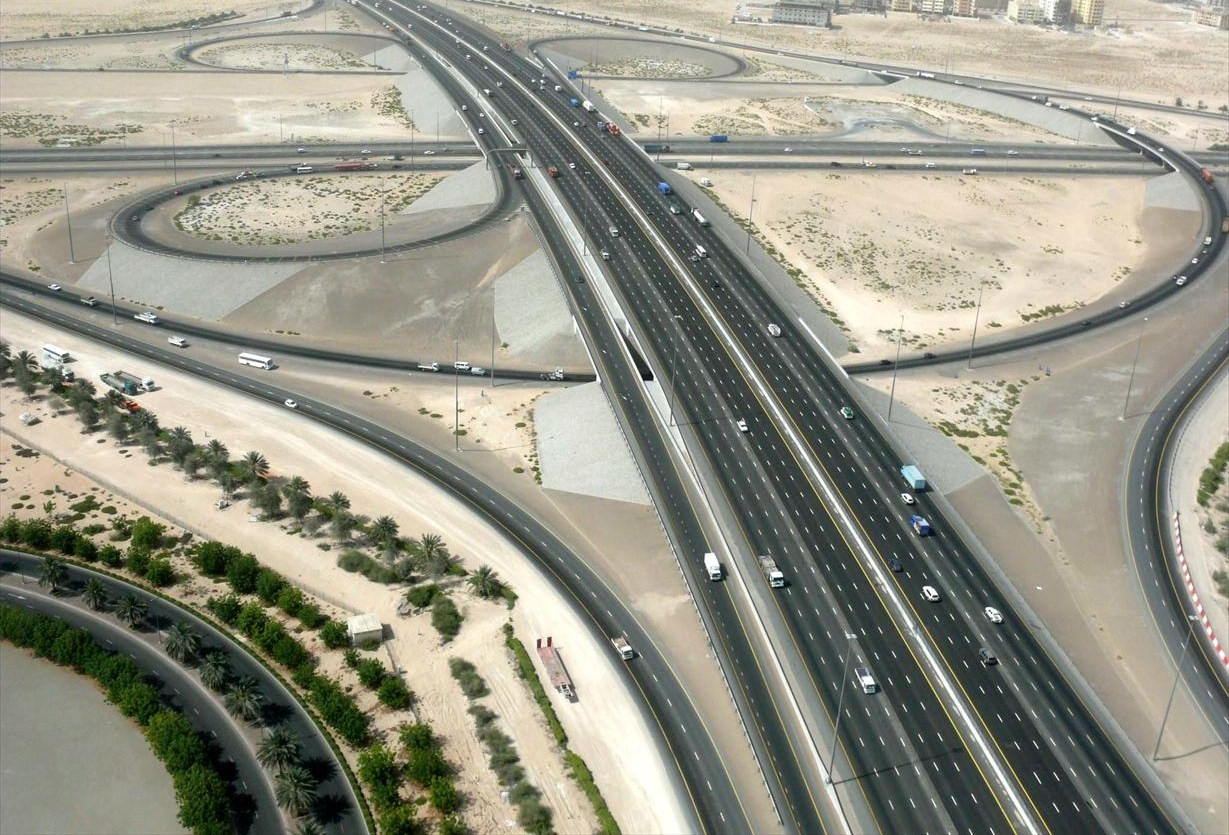
E 311, a major road in the UAE

Abu Dhabi, Dubai, Sharjah, Ajman, Umm Al Quwain, and Ras Al Khaimah are connected by the E11 highway, which is the longest road in the UAE. In Dubai, in addition to the Dubai Metro, The Dubai Tram and Palm Jumeirah Monorail also connect specific parts of the city. There is also a bus, taxi, abra (traditional boat), and water taxi network run by RTA. T1, a double-decker tram system in Downtown Dubai, were operational from 2015 to 2019.

Salik, meaning "open" or "clear", is Dubai's electronic toll collection system that was launched in July 2007 and is part of Dubai's traffic congestion management system. Each time one passes through a Salik tolling point, a toll is deducted from the drivers' prepaid toll account using advanced Radio Frequency Identification (RFID) technology. There are four Salik tolling points placed in strategic locations in Dubai: at Al Maktoum Bridge, Al Garhoud Bridge, and along Sheikh Zayed Road at Al Safa and Al Barsha.

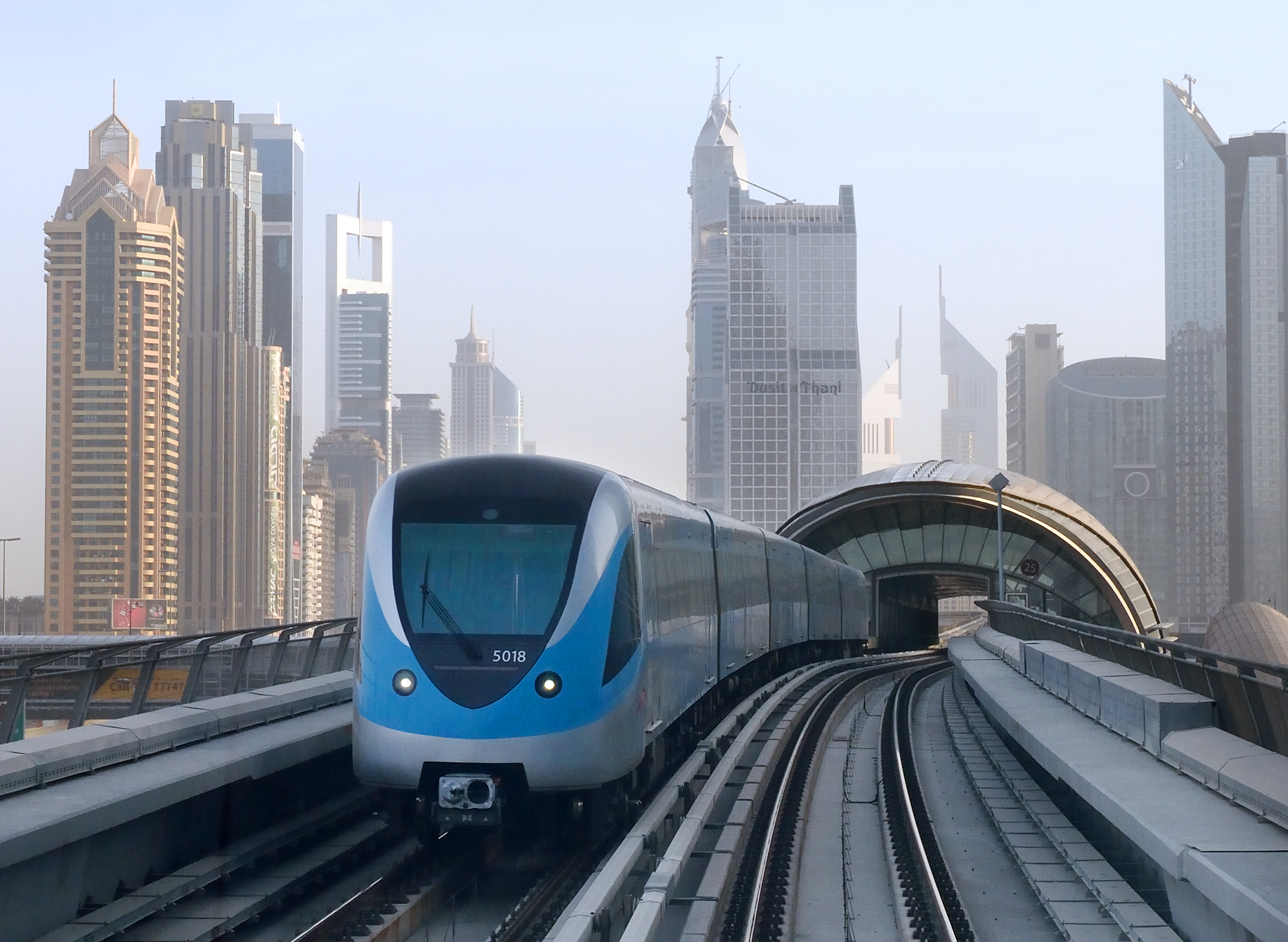
A Dubai Metro train. Dubai Metro is the Arabian peninsula's first rapid transit system and was the world's longest driverless metro network until 2016.

A 1,200 km (750 mi) country-wide railway is under construction which will connect all the major cities and ports. The Dubai Metro is the first urban train network in the Arabian Peninsula.

The major ports of the United Arab Emirates are Khalifa Port, Zayed Port, Port Jebel Ali, Port Rashid, Port Khalid, Port Saeed, and Port Khor Fakkan. The Emirates are increasingly developing their logistics and ports in order to participate in trade between Europe and China or Africa. For this purpose, ports are being rapidly expanded and investments are being made in their technology.

The Emirates have historically been and currently still are part of the Maritime Silk Road that runs from the Chinese coast to the south via the southern tip of India to Mombasa, from there through the Red Sea via the Suez Canal to the Mediterranean, there to the Upper Adriatic region and the northern Italian hub of Trieste with its rail connections to Central Europe, Eastern Europe, and the North Sea.

=== Telecommunications ===
The United Arab Emirates is served by two telecommunications operators, Etisalat and Emirates Integrated Telecommunications Company ("du"). Etisalat operated a monopoly until du launched mobile services in February 2007. Internet subscribers were expected to increase from 0.904 million in 2007 to 2.66 million in 2012. The regulator, the Telecommunications Regulatory Authority, mandates filtering websites for religious, political, and sexual content.

5G wireless services were installed nationwide in 2019 through a partnership with Huawei.

== Demographics ==
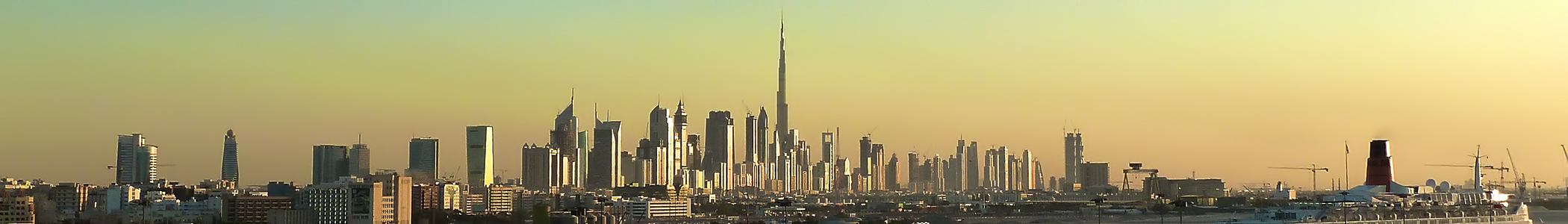
The skyline of Dubai, the largest city in the United Arab Emirates

According to an estimate by the World Bank, the UAE's population in 2020 was 9,890,400. Immigrants accounted for 88.52% while Emiratis made up the remaining 11.48%. This unique imbalance is due to the country's exceptionally high net migration rate of 21.71, the world's highest. UAE citizenship is very difficult to obtain other than by filiation and only granted under very special circumstances.

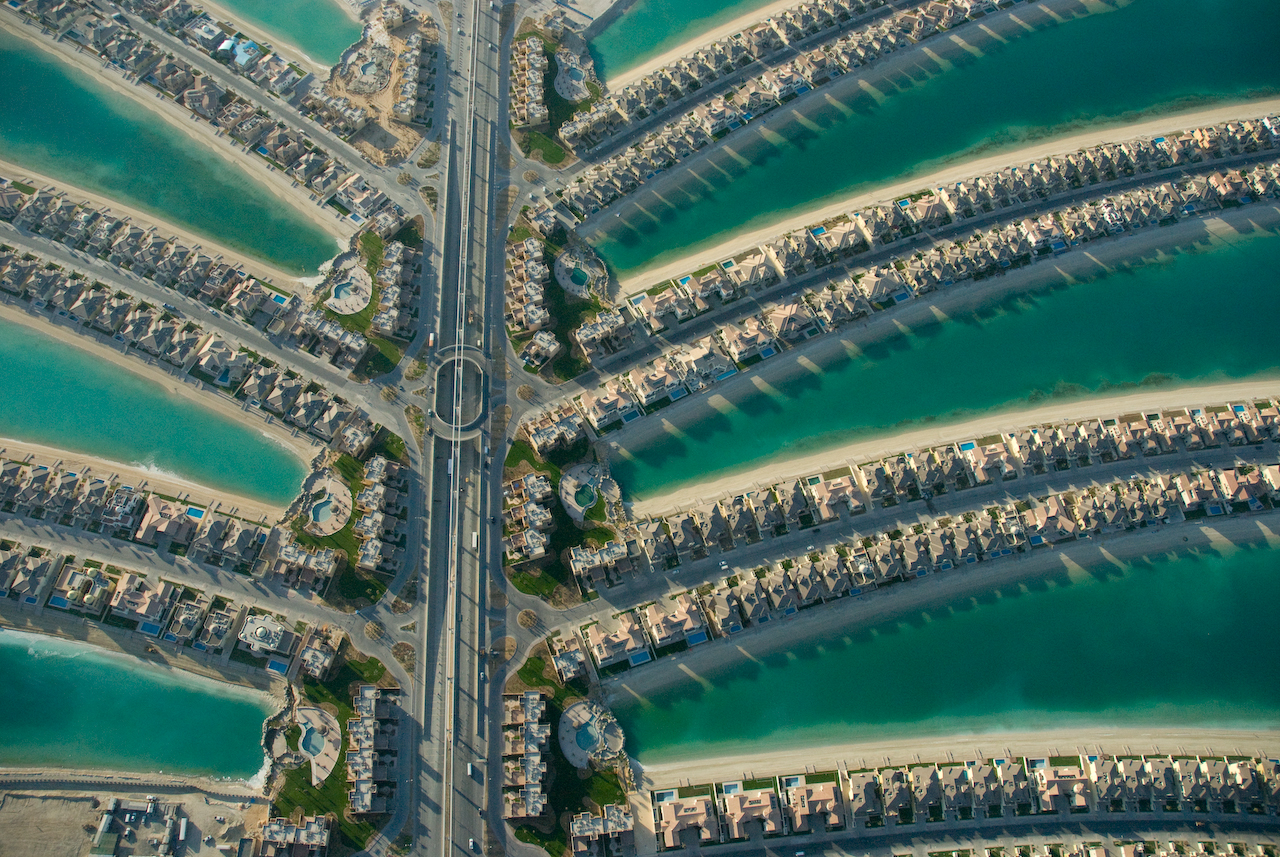
Residential villas in the Palm Jumeirah palm fronds in Dubai

The UAE is ethnically diverse. The five most populous nationalities for expatriates in the emirates of Dubai, Sharjah, and Ajman are Indian (25%), Pakistani (12%), Emirati (9%), Bangladeshi (7%), and Filipino (5%). Expatriates from Europe, Australia, and North America make up around 100,000 of the population. The rest of the population are from other Arab states.

About 88% of the population of the United Arab Emirates is urban. The average life expectancy was 76.7 in 2012, higher than for any other Arab country. With a male/female sex ratio of 2.2 males for each female in the total population and 2.75 to 1 for the 15–65 age group, the UAE's gender imbalance is second highest in the world after Qatar.

=== Largest cities ===
Largest cities or towns in the United Arab Emirates 2023 Calculation
Rank	Name	Emirate	Pop.
1	Dubai	Dubai	3,564,931
2	Abu Dhabi	Abu Dhabi	1,807,000
3	Sharjah	Sharjah	1,405,000
4	Al Ain	Abu Dhabi	846,747
5	Ajman	Ajman	490,035
6	Ras Al Khaimah	Ras al Khaimah	191,753
7	Fujairah	Fujairah	118,933
8	Umm Al Quwain	Umm Al Quwain	59,098
9	Khor Fakkan	Sharjah	53,000
10	Kalba	Sharjah	51,000

=== Language ===
Modern Standard Arabic is the national language of the United Arab Emirates. English is the most commonly spoken language, following British English conventions. Emirati Arabic, a variety of Gulf Arabic, is spoken natively by Emirati people.

=== Religion ===
Sheikh Zayed Grand Mosque in Abu Dhabi

Islam is the largest and the official state religion of the United Arab Emirates. The government follows a policy of tolerance toward other religions and rarely interferes in the religious activities of non-Muslims.

There are more Sunni than Shia Muslims in the United Arab Emirates, and 85% of the Emirati population are Sunni Muslims with most of them adhering to the Maliki school of jurisprudence. The vast majority of the remaining 15% are Shia Muslims, who are concentrated in the Emirates of Dubai and Sharjah. Although no official statistics are available for the breakdown between Sunni and Shia Muslims among noncitizen residents, media estimates suggest less than 20% of the noncitizen Muslim population are Shia. The Sheikh Zayed Grand Mosque in Abu Dhabi is the largest mosque in the country and a major tourist attraction. Ibadi is common among Omanis in the UAE, while Sufi influences exist as well.

Christians account for 9% of the total population of the United Arab Emirates, according to the 2005 census; estimates in 2010 suggested a figure of 12.6%. Roman Catholics and Protestants form significant proportions of the Christian minority. The country has over 52 churches in 2023. Many Christians in the United Arab Emirates are of Asian, African, and European origin, along with fellow Middle Eastern countries such as Lebanon, Syria, and Egypt. The United Arab Emirates forms part of the Apostolic Vicariate of Southern Arabia and the Vicar Apostolic Bishop Paul Hinder is based in Abu Dhabi.

There is a small Jewish community in the United Arab Emirates. Before 2023, there was only one known synagogue in Dubai, which has been open since 2008 and the synagogue also welcomes visitors. Another synagogue, Moses Ben Maimon Synagogue, was completed in 2023 as part of the Abrahamic Family House complex in Abu Dhabi. As of 2019, according to Rabbi Marc Schneier of the Foundation for Ethnic Understanding, it is estimated that there are about 150 families to 3,000 Jews who live and worship freely in the UAE.

Religions in UAE in 2010 (Pew Research)
Religion	Per cent
Islam	76%
Christianity	13%
Hinduism	7%
Buddhism	2%
Other	1%
None	1%

South Asians in the United Arab Emirates constitute the largest ethnic group in the country. Over 2 million Indian migrants (mostly from the southern states of Kerala, Andhra Pradesh, Coastal Karnataka, and Tamil Nadu) are estimated to be living in the UAE. There are currently three Hindu temples in the country. Other religions also exist in the United Arab Emirates, including Jainism, Sikhism, Buddhism, Judaism, Baháʼís, and Druze.

The UAE Minister of Foreign Affairs and International Co-operation, Abdullah bin Zayed, announced in 2019 the design and construction plan of the Abrahamic Family House, which will serve as an interfaith complex that houses a synagogue, mosque, and a church on Saadiyat Island in Abu Dhabi.

=== Education ===
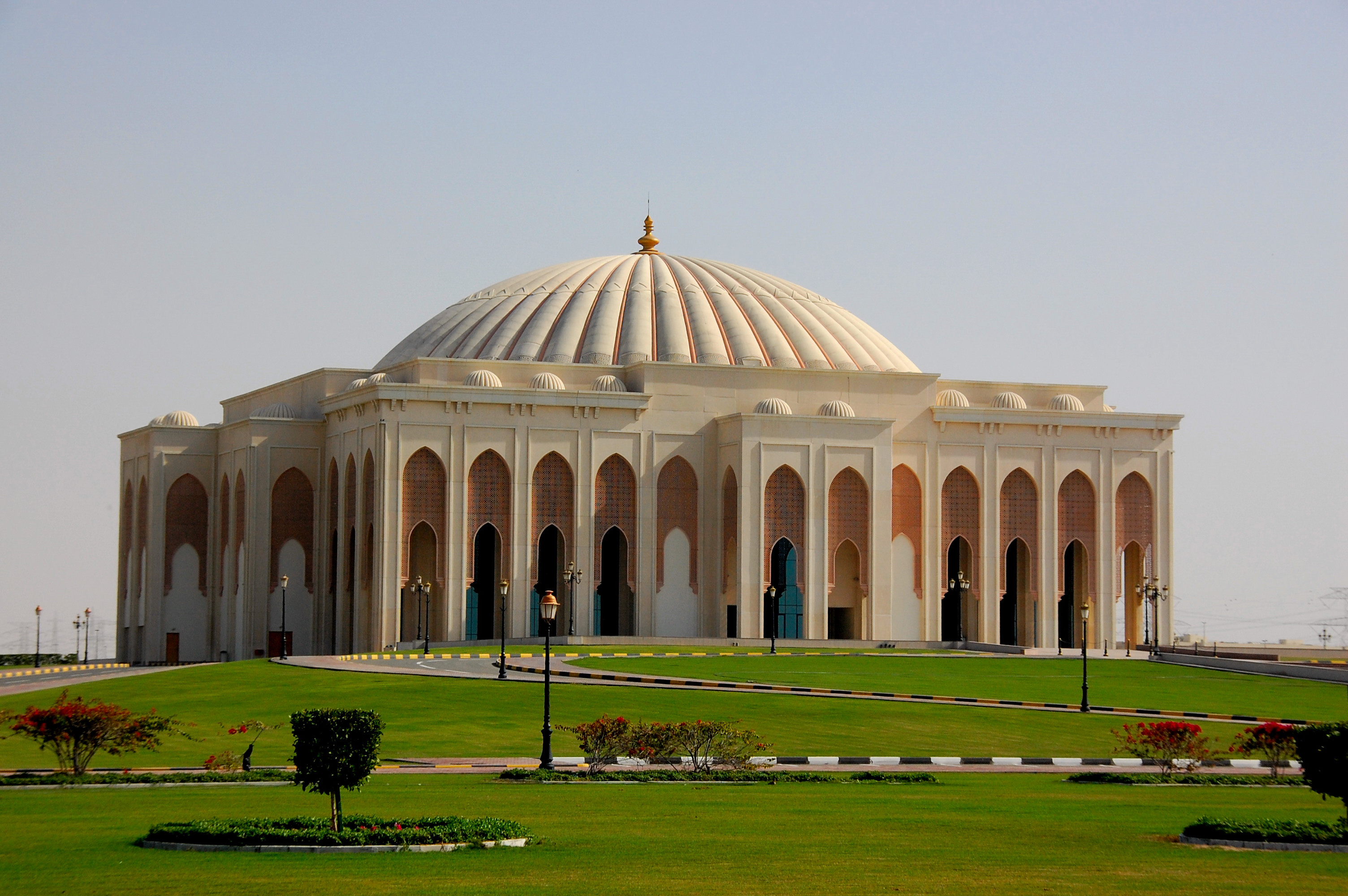
University City Hall is the largest building located in University City in Sharjah. Graduation ceremonies of American University of Sharjah, University of Sharjah, and Higher Colleges of Technology are notably held here.

The education system through secondary level is administered by the Ministry of Education in all emirates except Abu Dhabi, where it falls under the authority of the Department of Education and Knowledge. Public schools are divided into primary schools, middle schools, and high schools. The public schools are government-funded and the curriculum is created to match the United Arab Emirates' development goals. The medium of instruction in the public school is Arabic with emphasis on English as a second language. There are also many private schools which are internationally accredited. Public schools in the country are free for citizens of the UAE, while the fees for private schools vary.

The higher education system is monitored by the Ministry of Higher Education. The ministry also is responsible for admitting students to its undergraduate institutions. The adult literacy rate in 2015 was 93.8%.

The UAE has shown a strong interest in improving education and research. Enterprises include the establishment of the CERT Research Centres and the Masdar Institute of Science and Technology and Institute for Enterprise Development. According to the QS Rankings, the top-ranking universities in the country are the United Arab Emirates University (421–430th worldwide), Khalifa University (441–450th worldwide), the American University of Sharjah (431–440th), and University of Sharjah (551–600th worldwide). United Arab Emirates was ranked 33rd in the Global Innovation Index in 2021, up from 36th in 2019.

=== Health ===
In 2018, the life expectancy at birth in the UAE was 76.96 years. Cardiovascular disease is the principal cause of death in the UAE, constituting 28% of total deaths; other major causes are accidents and injuries, malignancies, and congenital anomalies. According to World Health Organization data from 2016, 34.5% of adults in the UAE are clinically obese, with a body mass index (BMI) score of 30 or more.

In February 2008, the Ministry of Health unveiled a five-year health strategy for the public health sector in the northern emirates, which fall under its purview and which, unlike Abu Dhabi and Dubai, do not have separate healthcare authorities. The strategy focuses on unifying healthcare policy and improving access to healthcare services at reasonable cost, at the same time reducing dependence on overseas treatment. The ministry plans to add three hospitals to the current 14, and 29 primary healthcare centres to the current 86. Nine were scheduled to open in 2008.

The introduction of mandatory health insurance in Abu Dhabi for expatriates and their dependents was a major driver in reform of healthcare policy. Abu Dhabi nationals were brought under the scheme in June 2008 and Dubai followed for its government employees. Eventually, under federal law, every Emirati and expatriate in the country will be covered by compulsory health insurance under a unified mandatory scheme. The UAE has benefited from medical tourists from all over the Cooperation Council for the Arab States of the Gulf. The UAE attracts medical tourists seeking cosmetic surgery and advanced procedures, cardiac and spinal surgery, and dental treatment, as health services have higher standards than other Arab countries in the Persian Gulf.

== Culture ==
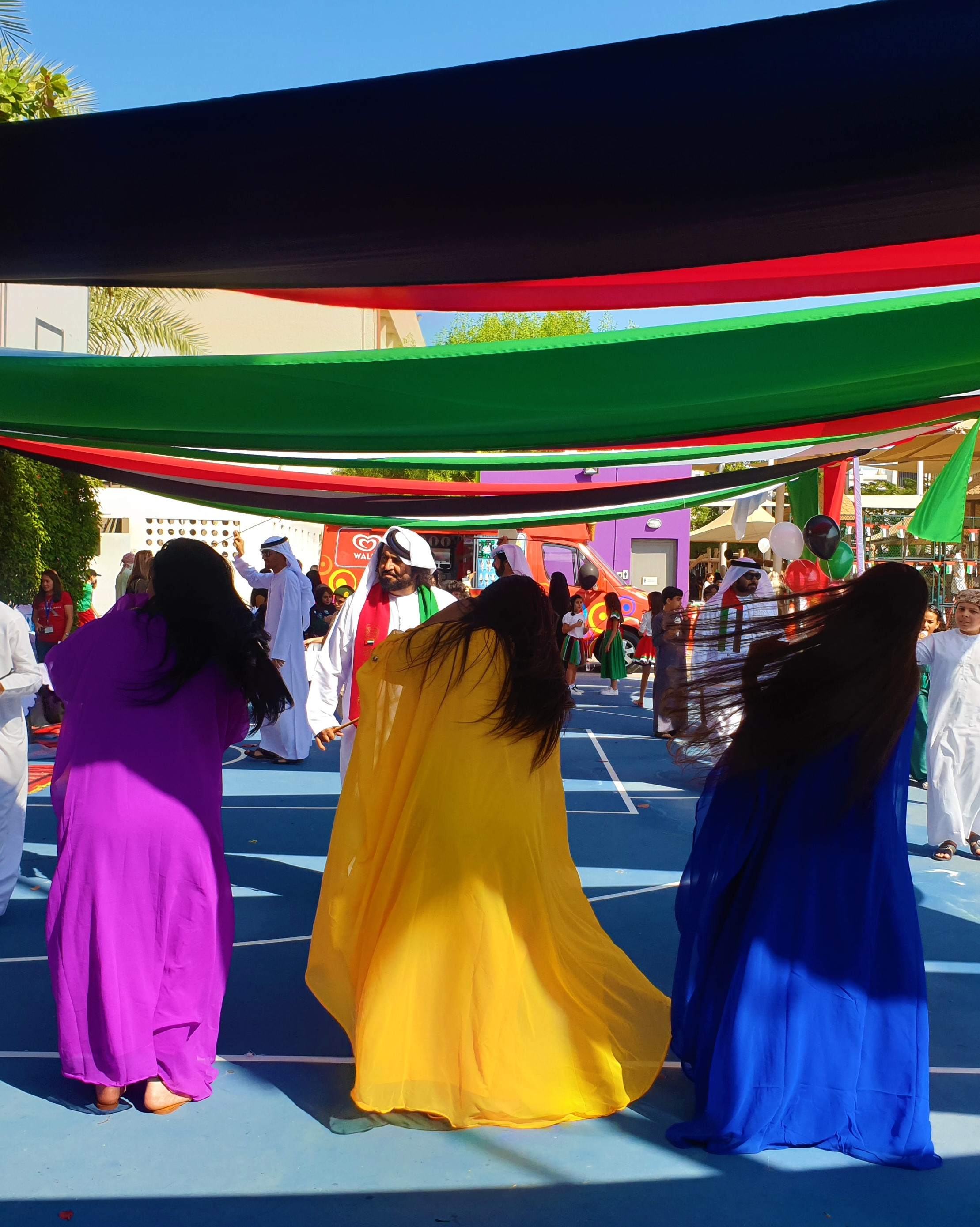
Women in an Emirati folk dance.

Emirati culture is based on Arabian culture and has been influenced by the cultures of Persia, India, and East Africa. Arabian and Persian inspired architecture is part of the expression of the local Emirati identity. Arabian influence on Emirati culture is noticeably visible in traditional Emirati architecture and folk arts. For example, the distinctive wind tower that tops traditional Emirati buildings, the barjeel, has become an identifying mark of Emirati architecture and is attributed to Arabian influence. This influence is derived both from traders who fled the tax regime in Persia in the early 19th century and from Emirati ownership of ports on the Arabian coast, for instance the Al Qassimi port of Lingeh.

Major holidays in the United Arab Emirates include Eid al Fitr, which marks the end of Ramadan, and National Day (2 December), which marks the formation of the United Arab Emirates.

Literature and other written works by modern Emiratis are not well known globally because the majority of writers in the country do not publish in English, women are restricted from participating in traditional literary groups, and freedom of expression is suppressed. The earliest known poet in the UAE is Ibn Majid, born between 1432 and 1437 in Ras Al-Khaimah. The most famous Emirati writers were Mubarak Al Oqaili (1880–1954), Salem bin Ali al Owais (1887–1959), and Ahmed bin Sulayem (1905–1976). Three other poets from Sharjah, known as the Hirah group, are observed to have been heavily influenced by the Apollo and Romantic poets. The Sharjah International Book Fair is the oldest and largest in the country.

Traditional folk dances, such as Al-Ayyala, are performed by men and women in the UAE during festivals, holidays, and weddings. Liwa is a type of music and dance performed locally, mainly in communities that contain descendants of Bantu peoples from the African Great Lakes region.

The list of museums in the United Arab Emirates includes some of regional repute, most famously Sharjah with its Heritage District containing 17 museums, which in 1998 was the Cultural Capital of the Arab World. In Dubai, the area of Al Quoz has attracted a number of art galleries as well as museums such as the Salsali Private Museum. Abu Dhabi has established a culture district on Saadiyat Island. Six grand projects are planned, including the Guggenheim Abu Dhabi and the Louvre Abu Dhabi. Dubai also plans to build a Kunsthal museum and a district for galleries and artists. There are very few cinemas of the United Arab Emirates, and any published material is subject to strict censorship guidelines, despite a repeal of the harshest guidelines in 2021. To view a movie in the country you must be 21 years old.

=== Media ===
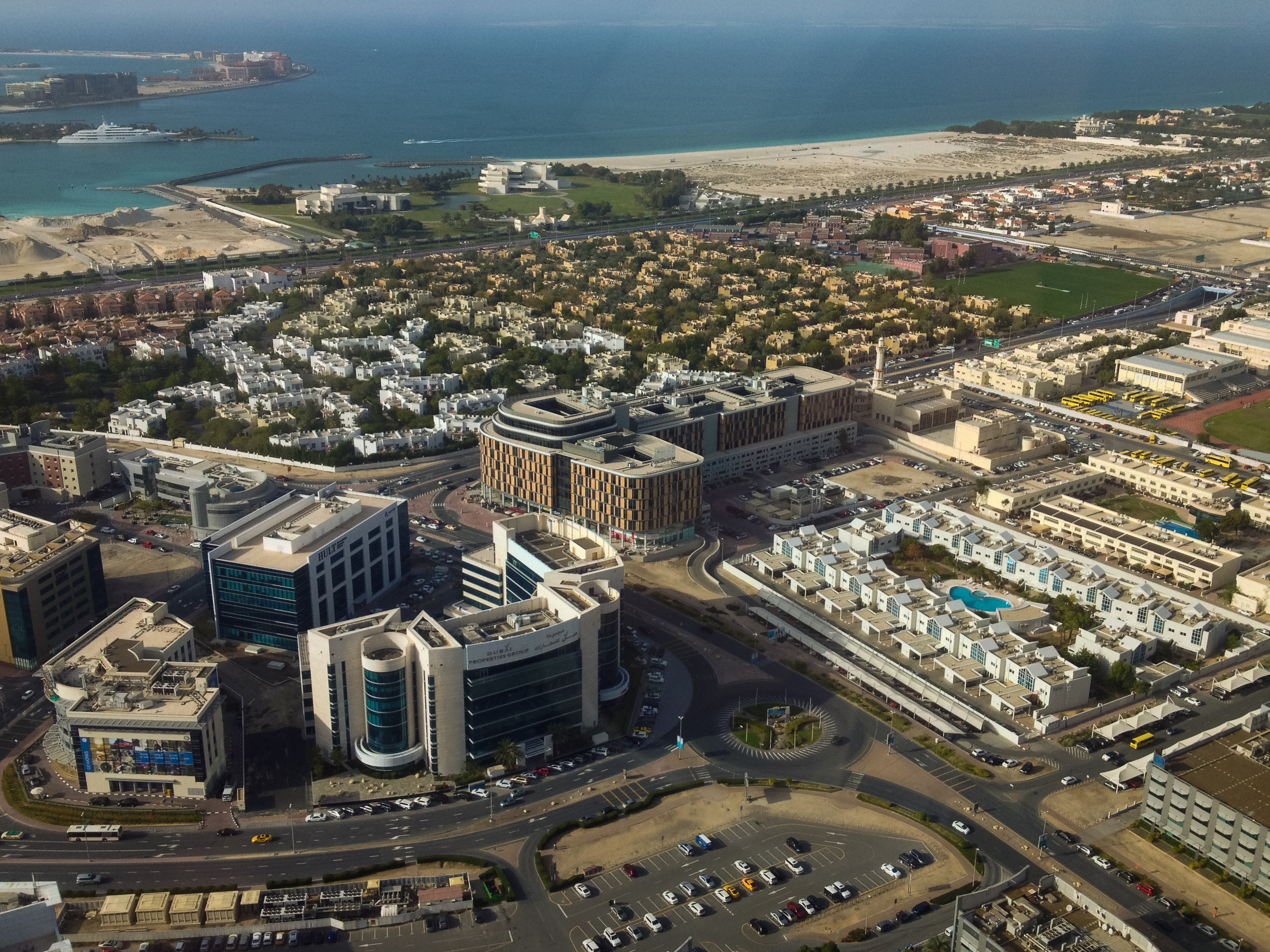
Dubai Media City is home to diverse news and tech companies.

The UAE's media is annually classified as "not free" in the Freedom of the Press report by Freedom House. The UAE ranks poorly in the annual Press Freedom Index by Reporters without Borders. Dubai Media City is the UAE's main media zone. The UAE is home to some pan-Arab broadcasters, including the Middle East Broadcasting Centre and Orbit Showtime Network. In 2007, Sheikh Mohammed bin Rashid Al Maktoum decreed that journalists can no longer be prosecuted or imprisoned for reasons relating to their work.

At the same time, the UAE has made it illegal to disseminate online material that can threaten "public order", and hands down prison terms for those who "deride or damage" the reputation of the state and "display contempt" for religion. Journalists who are arrested for violating this law are often brutally beaten by the police.

According to UAE Year Book 2013, there are seven Arabic newspapers and eight English language newspapers, as well as a Tagalog newspaper produced and published in the UAE.

New media, such as Facebook, Twitter, YouTube, and Instagram are used widely in the UAE by the government entities and by the public as well. The UAE government avails official social media accounts to communicate with public and hear their needs.

In recent years, there has been a notable surge in digital media consumption in the UAE, driven by the widespread use of platforms like Snapchat and TikTok among the younger population. Influencers on these platforms play a significant role in shaping trends and promoting various products and services. The government has also implemented digital initiatives to enhance e-Government services and promote smart city concepts, further demonstrating the UAE's commitment to technological advancements.

=== Cuisine ===
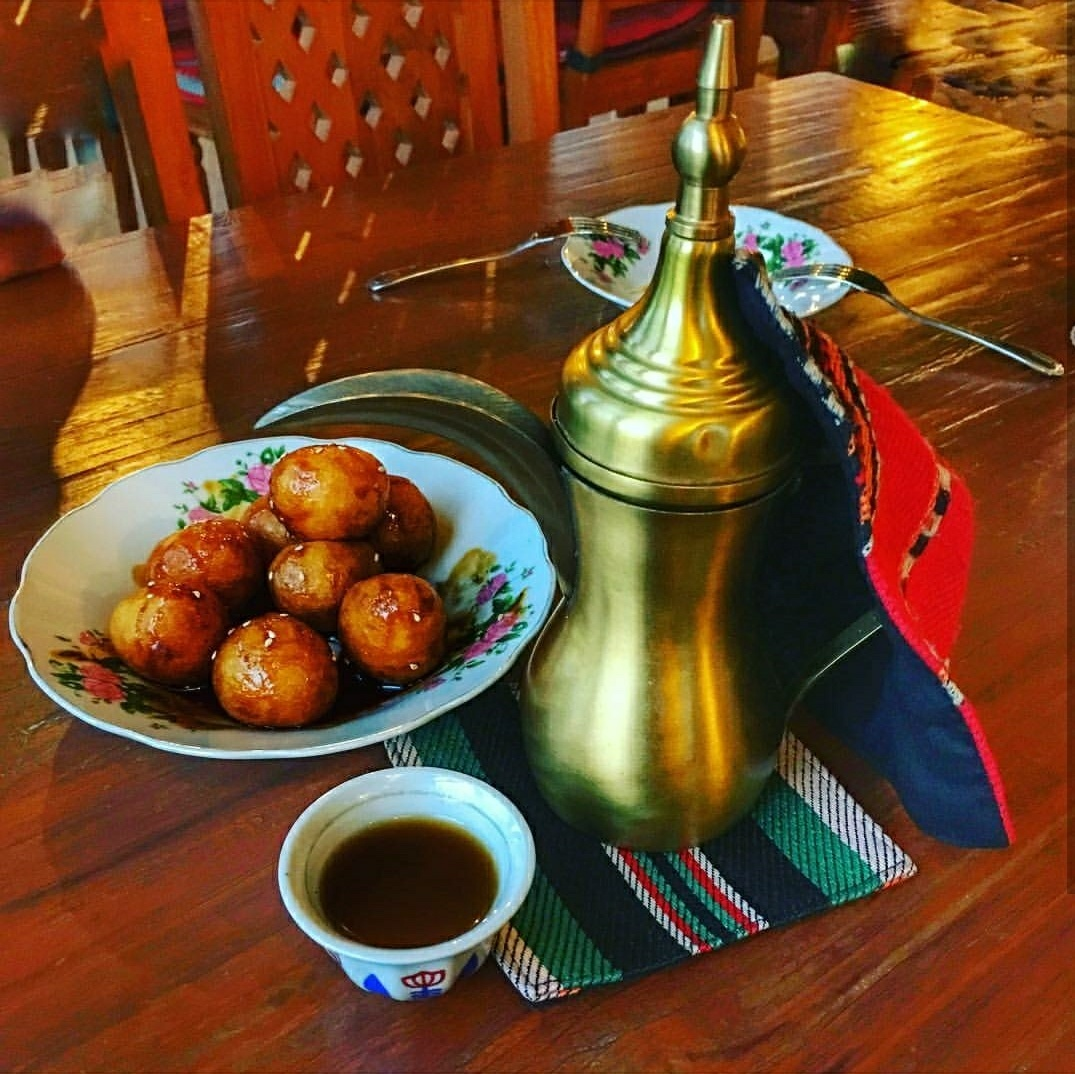
Arabic coffee with lugaimat, a traditional Emirati sweet

The traditional food of the Emirates has always been rice, fish, and meat. The people of the United Arab Emirates have adopted most of their foods from other West and South Asian countries including Iran, Saudi Arabia, Oman, Pakistan, and India. Seafood has been the mainstay of the Emirati diet for centuries. Meat and rice are other staple foods, with lamb and mutton preferred to goat and beef. Popular beverages are coffee and tea, which can be complemented with cardamom or saffron to give them a distinctive flavour.

Popular cultural Emirati dishes include threed, machboos, khubisa, khameer, and chabab bread among others while lugaimat is a famous Emirati dessert.

With the influence of western culture, fast food has become very popular among young people, to the extent that campaigns have been held to highlight the dangers of fast food excesses. Alcohol is allowed to be served only in hotel restaurants and bars. All nightclubs are permitted to sell alcohol. Specific supermarkets may sell alcohol, but these products are sold in separate sections. Likewise, pork, which is haram (not permitted for Muslims), is sold in separate sections in all major supermarkets. Although alcohol may be consumed, it is illegal to be intoxicated in public or drive a motor vehicle with any trace of alcohol in the blood.

=== Sports ===
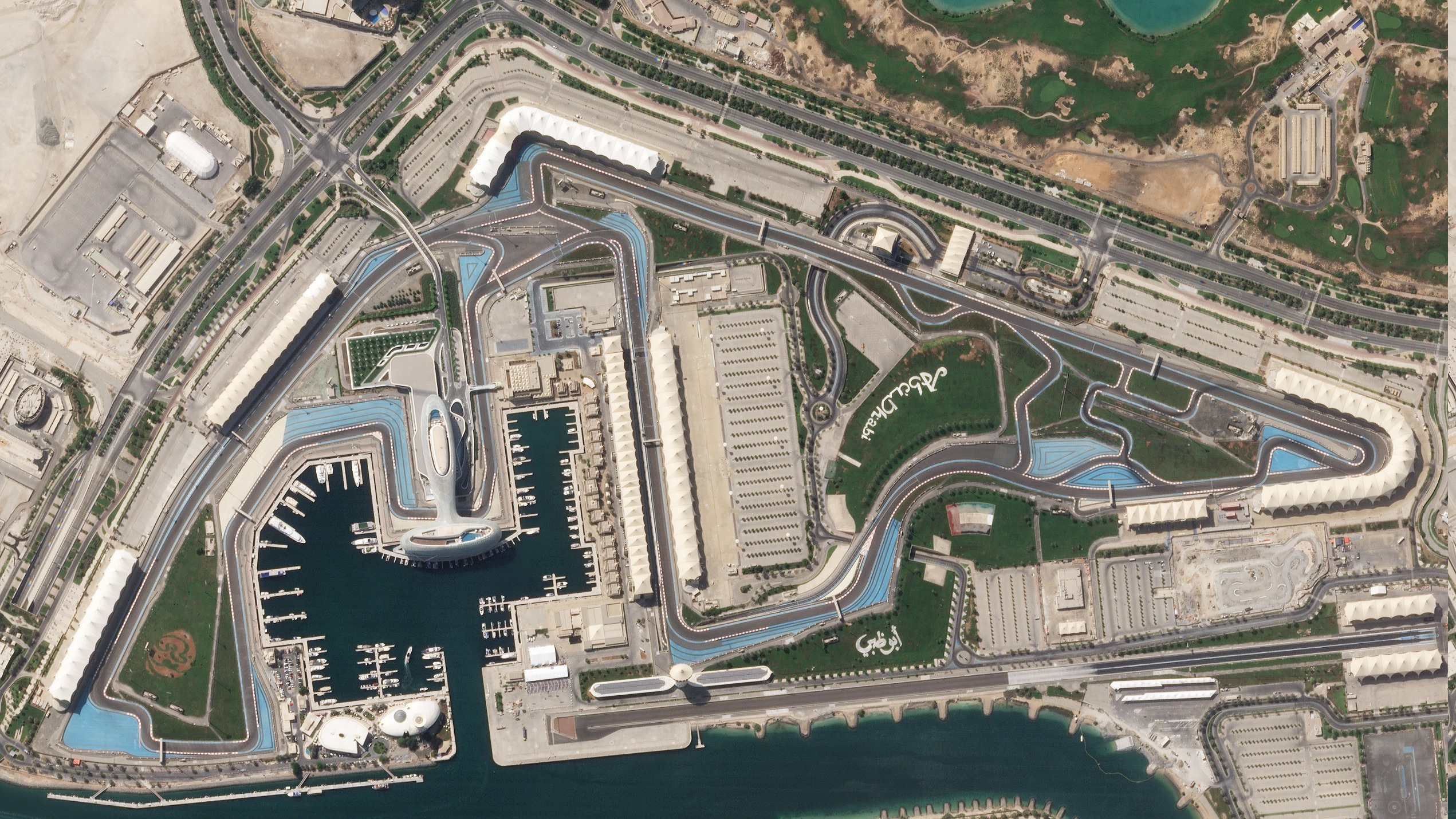
The Yas Marina Circuit in Abu Dhabi

Formula One is particularly popular in the United Arab Emirates, and a Grand Prix is annually held at the Yas Marina Circuit in Yas Island in Abu Dhabi. The race takes place in the evening, and was the first ever Grand Prix to start in daylight and finish at night. Other popular sports include camel racing, falconry, endurance riding, and tennis. The emirate of Dubai is also home to two major golf courses: the Dubai Golf Club and Emirates Golf Club.

Aside from the leisure aspect, sports can play an important part in shaping national identity. Falconry, for example, has functioned as a national symbol since its inception in 1971. Aside from the national prevalence of falconry, the UAE have played a formative role internationally in the co-ordination of UNESCO's recognition of falconry as intangible heritage.

In the past, child camel jockeys were used, leading to widespread criticism. Eventually, the UAE passed laws banning the use of children for the sport, leading to the prompt removal of almost all child jockeys. Recently robot jockeys have been introduced to overcome the problem of child camel jockeys which was an issue of human rights violations. Ansar Burney is often praised for the work he has done in this area.

==== Football ====
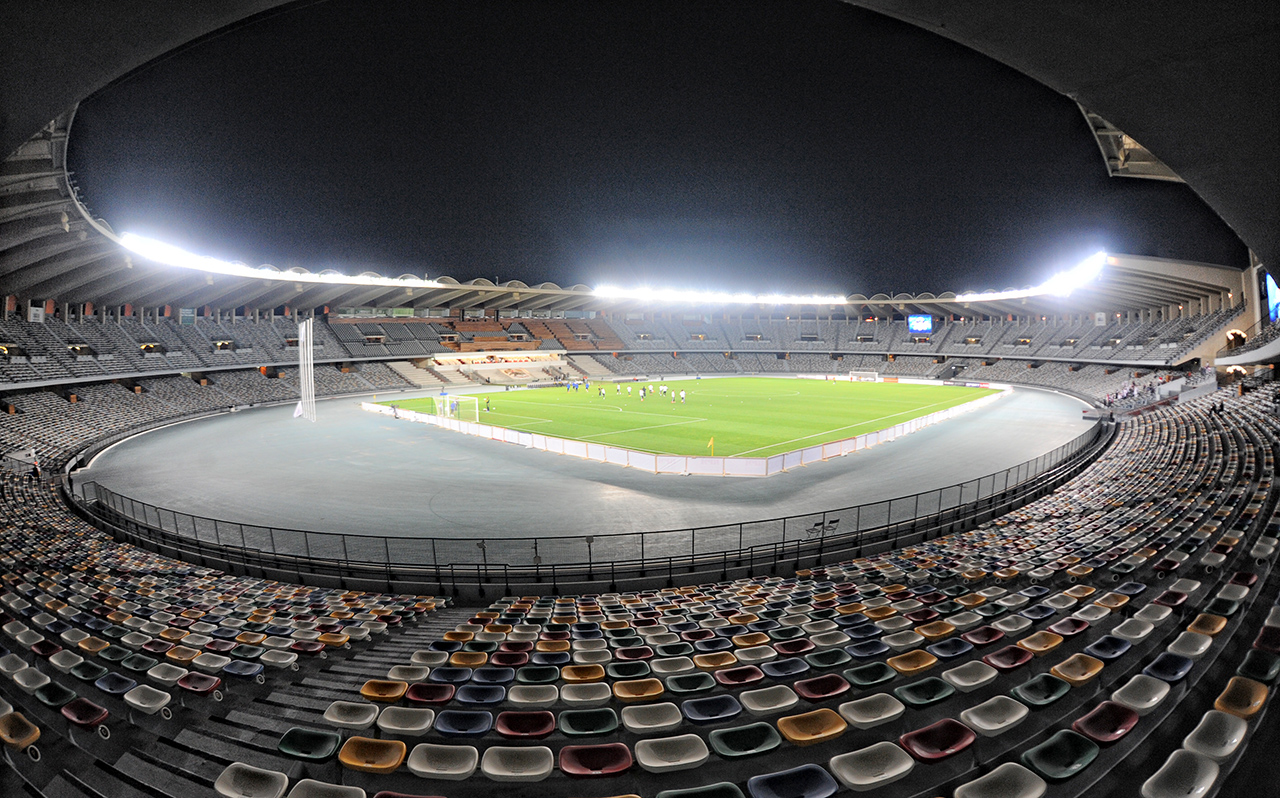
Zayed Sports City Stadium in Abu Dhabi

Football is a popular sport in the UAE. Al Nasr, Al Ain, Al Wasl, Sharjah, Al Wahda, Shabab Al Ahli, Baniyas, Emirates, and Al Jazira are the most popular teams and enjoy the reputation of long-time regional champions. The United Arab Emirates Football Association was established in 1974 and since then has dedicated its time and effort to promoting the game, organising youth programmes, and improving the abilities of not only its players, but also the officials and coaches involved with its regional teams.

The UAE’s senior men's team qualified for the Italy FIFA World Cup in 1990 (along with Egypt) and finished at 24th place. It was the third consecutive World Cup with two Arab nations qualifying, after Kuwait and Algeria in 1982, and Iraq and Algeria again in 1986. The UAE has won the Gulf Cup Championship twice: the first cup won in January 2007 held in Abu Dhabi and the second in January 2013, held in Bahrain; they were runners-up four times and placed third four times.

The UAE hosted the 1996 AFC Asian Cup and went all the way to the final, where they were defeated by the eventual champions and placed 2nd; subsequently they qualified for the 1997 Confederations Cup as Asian champions and finished in 6th place. They also finished 3rd at the 2015 Asian Cup in Australia. In the Olympic level the UAE finished 2nd in 2010 and 3rd in 2018 Asian Games, and participated in the 2012 Summer Olympics at London to finish 15th. In the Arab Cup they finished 2nd in 2005 at Switzerland and 3rd in 2025 at Qatar. Other tournaments they Won were the 2005 Kirin Cup, 2000 LG Cup, 2013 OSN Cup in Saudi Arabia, and Friendship Tournament which they won twice, placed 2nd twice and placed 3rd once.

Regarding Emirati clubs' international level, Al Ain qualified for the 2018 FIFA Club World Cup, defeating the champions of Oceania, Africa, and South America to ultimately face European champions Real Madrid in the final and finish as runners-up. Al Ain also qualified for the expanded 2025 FIFA Club World Cup, finishing with three points and being eliminated in the group stage. Al Ain won the AFC Champions League Elite twice, in 2003 and 2024, and finished as runners-up twice, in 2005 and 2016, a feat also achieved by Shabab Al Ahli in 2015. They also finished third in 1999, a position also attained by Al Wasl in 1993.

In the AFC Champions League Two, Al Shaab (now Sharjah) finished as runners-up in 1995 and won the title 30 years later in 2025. Eight editions of the AGCFF Champions League were won by Emirati clubs, most of whom were Al Shabab Al Arabi (part of Shabab Al Ahli today), finished as runners-up four times and third place twice. Al Ain also finished as runners-up for the 2024 African–Asian–Pacific Cup, part of the 2024 FIFA Intercontinental Cup. The only two editions of the UAE–Morocco Super Cup, which were held in 2015 and 2016, ended with the Emirati clubs winning, and the four Qatar-UAE Super/Challenge Cups and Shields in 2025 ended with all Emirati clubs winning them.

Emirati ownership extends to several professional football clubs outside the United Arab Emirates through City Football Group, a UK-based holding company majority owned by an Abu Dhabi–registered investment vehicle controlled by Sheikh Mansour bin Zayed Al Nahyan. The group holds full or partial ownership of clubs in multiple countries, including Manchester City FC (England), New York City FC (United States), Melbourne City FC (Australia), Yokohama F. Marinos (Japan), Girona FC (Spain), ESTAC Troyes (France), Lommel SK (Belgium), and Palermo FC (Italy).

==== Cricket ====
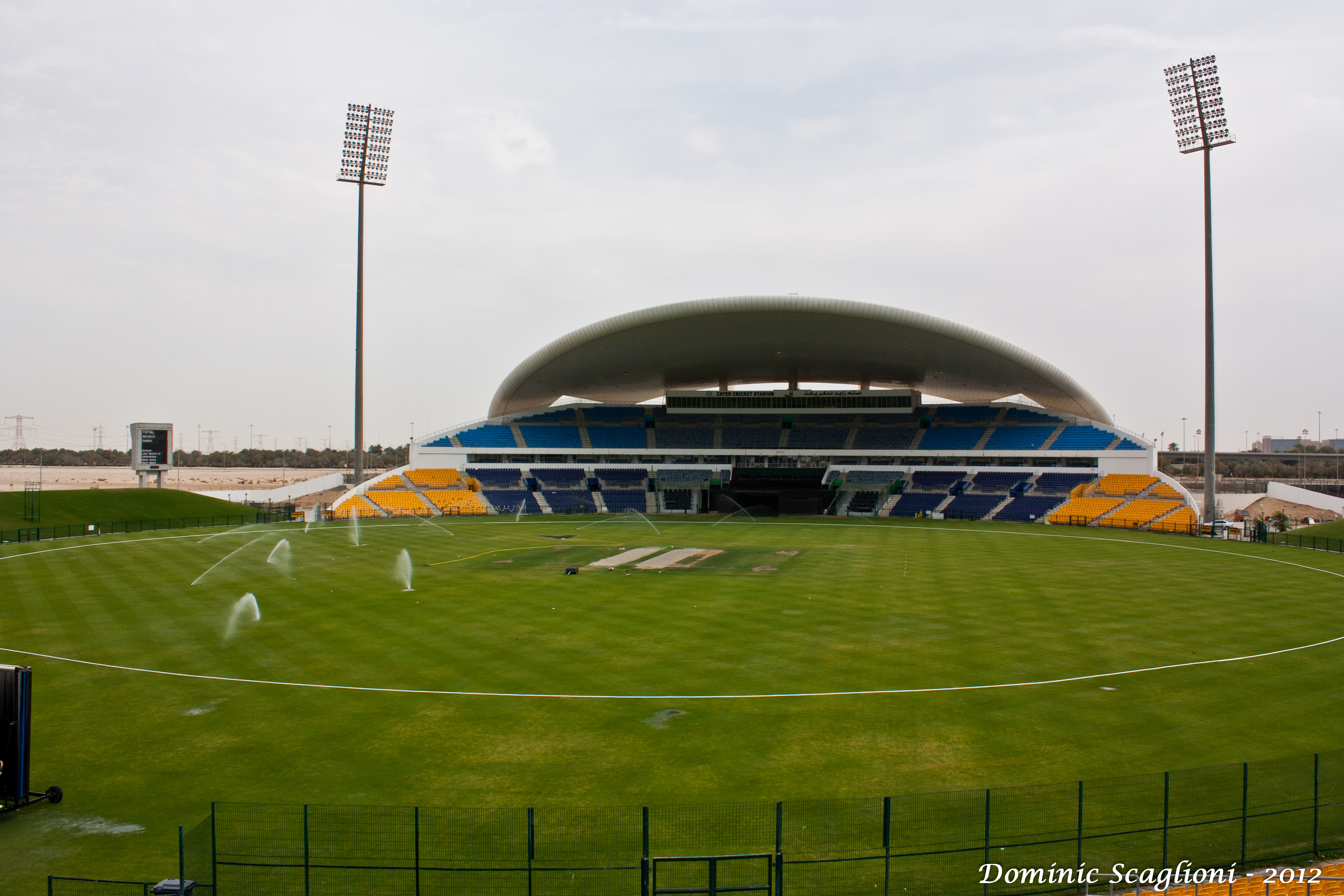
Sheikh Zayed Cricket Stadium in Abu Dhabi

Cricket is one of the most popular sports in the UAE, largely because of the expatriate population from the SAARC countries, the United Kingdom, and Australia. The headquarters of the International Cricket Council (ICC) have been located in the Dubai Sports City complex since 2005, including the ICC Academy which was established in 2009. There are a number of international cricket venues in the UAE, which are frequently used for international tournaments and "neutral" bilateral series due to the local climate and Dubai's status as a transport hub.

Notable international tournaments hosted by the UAE have included the 2014 Under-19 Cricket World Cup, the 2021 ICC Men's T20 World Cup, and three editions of the Asia Cup (1984, 1995, and 2018). Notable grounds include the Sharjah Cricket Association Stadium in Sharjah, Sheikh Zayed Cricket Stadium in Abu Dhabi, and Dubai International Cricket Stadium in Dubai.

The Emirates Cricket Board (ECB) became a member of the ICC in 1990. The UAE national cricket team has qualified for the Cricket World Cup on two occasions (1996 and 2015) and the ICC Men's T20 World Cup on two occasions (2014 and 2022). The national women's team is similarly one of the strongest associate teams in Asia, notably participating in the 2018 ICC Women's World Twenty20 Qualifier.

Following the 2009 attack on the Sri Lanka national cricket team, the UAE served as the de facto home of the Pakistan national cricket team for nearly a decade, as well as hosting the Pakistan Super League. The UAE has also hosted one full edition of Indian Premier League (IPL) in 2020 and two partial editions of the Indian Premier League (IPL) in 2014 and 2021.

== See also ==
- List of United Arab Emirates–related topics
- Outline of the United Arab Emirates

== Sources ==
- Heard-Bey, Frauke (1996). From Trucial States to United Arab Emirates: A Society in Transition. London: Longman. ISBN 978-0-582-27728-1. OCLC 38355501.
