= Demographics of the United Arab Emirates =

Demographics of United Arab Emirates
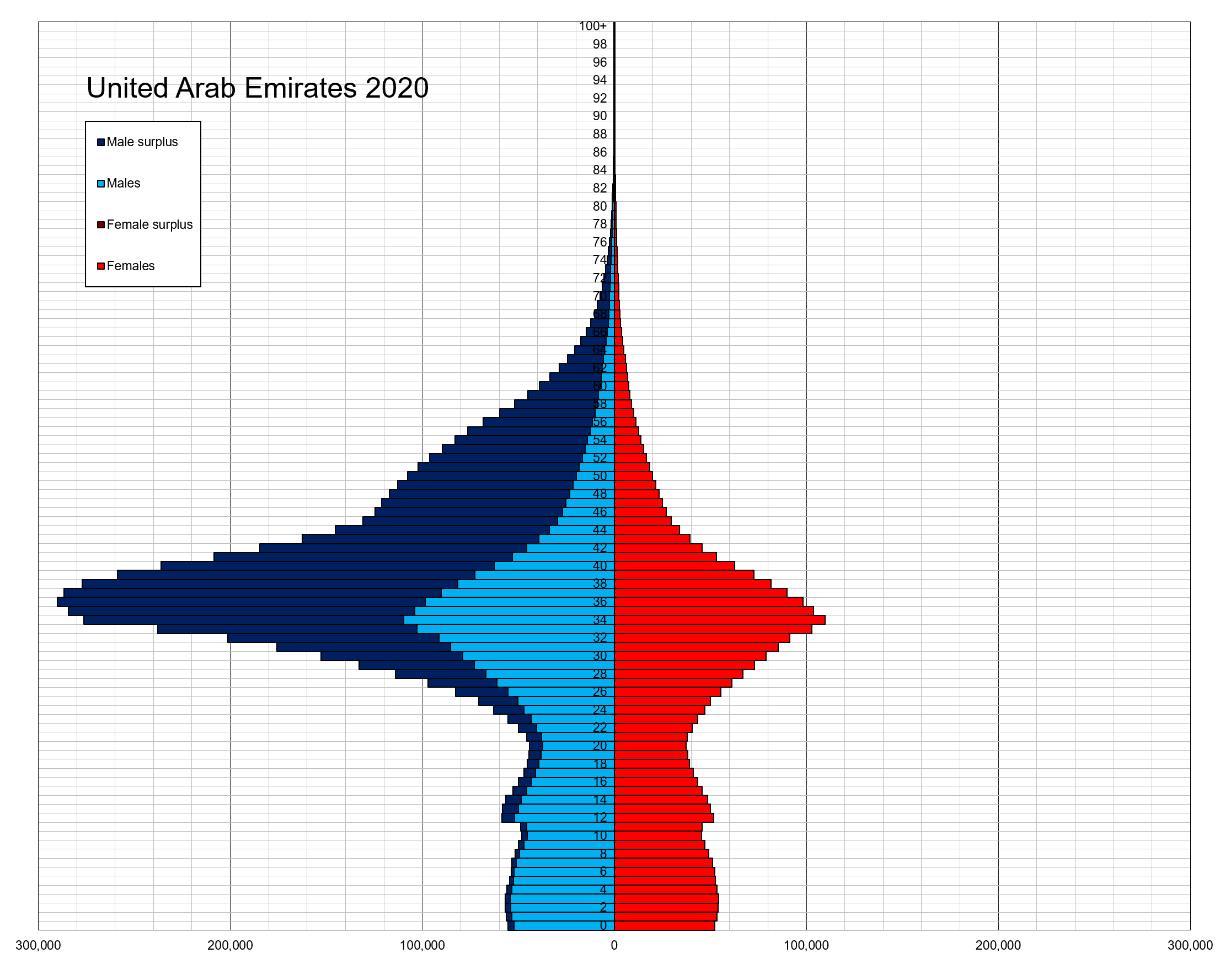
- Population pyramid of the United Arab Emirates in 2020
- Population: 11,027,129 (2024 est.)
- Growth rate: 0.58% (2022 est.)
- Birth rate: 10.81 births/1,000 population (2022 est.)
- Death rate: 1.56 deaths/1,000 population (2022 est.)
- Life expectancy: 79.56 years
  - male: 80.99 years
  - female: 78.21 years
- Fertility rate: 1.46 children born/woman (2022 est.)
- Infant mortality: 5.14 deaths/1,000 live births
- Net migration rate: 3.45 migrant(s)/1,000 population (2022 est.)
- Immigrant share: 74.0% (2024)

Age structure
- 0–14 years: 14.45%
- 15–64 years: 83.65%
- 65 and over: 1.90%

Sex ratio
- Total: 2.21 male(s)/female (2022 est.)
- At birth: 1.06 male(s)/female
- Under 15: 1.06 male(s)/female
- 65 and over: 1.86 male(s)/female

Nationality
- Nationality: Emirati
- Major ethnic: Arabs; South Asians; Iranians; Filipinos
- Minor ethnic: Afro-Arabs; Britons; Chinese

Language
- Official: Arabic
- Spoken: Arabic, English, Punjabi, Hindi–Urdu, Malayalam, Pashto, Tagalog, Persian

Demographic features of the United Arab Emirates (UAE) include population density, vital statistics, immigration and emigration data, ethnicity, education levels, religions practiced, and languages spoken within the UAE.

The majority of the population comes from South Asia and the Middle East. It is predominantly Muslim.

== Population ==
Historical population
Year	Pop.	±%
1963	95,000	—
1968	180,226	+89.7%
1975	557,887	+209.5%
1980	1,042,099	+86.8%
1985	1,379,303	+32.4%
1995	2,411,041	+74.8%
1999	2,938,000	+21.9%
2005	4,106,427	+39.8%
2010	8,264,070	+101.2%
2018	9,599,353	+16.2%
2025 estimate	11,350,000	+18.2%

The United Arab Emirates experienced a significant population increase in recent years as a result of major economic growth. This led to an influx of workers from diverse cultural and religious backgrounds, increasing the population from 4 million in 2004 to roughly 11.35 million in 2024. As of 2024, foreigners represent 88.50% of the population, the third largest proportion of expats in the world in relation to the nationals after Qatar and the Vatican. As of 2024, the largest group of non-UAE nationals are South Asian 68.36% (Indians 37.96%,Pakistanis 16.72%, Bangladeshis 7.38% and others 6.3%), Filipinos 6.1%, Iranians 4.72%, Egyptians 4.23% and other 2.16%.

Female citizens and non-citizens account for 36.20% percent of the UAE's population due to the high level of male foreign workers. The majority of the UAE population is between 25 and 54 years old 64.12%. A large part of this can be attributed to the expatriate worker population who fall in the age category. Population is heavily concentrated to the northeast on the Musandam Peninsula. The three largest Emirates (Dubai, Abu Dhabi, and Sharjah), are home to nearly 83% of the population.

As of 2024 the population of the UAE stood at 11.35 million, with 63.80% being male and 36.20% female. The country's total fertility rate (TFR) was 1.46, while that of the Emirati citizen population was 3.1, significantly higher than the national average, though reflecting a 16% decline from 3.7 in 2015. In 2024 the population density of the Emirates has reached a record 114 per km^{2}.

Emirate	Census 1975	Census 1985	Census 1995	Census 2005	Est. 2025
(Emirate of Abu Dhabi) Abu Dhabi	211,812	566,036	942,463	1,399,484	3,789,860
(Emirate of Dubai) Dubai	183,187	370,788	689,420	1,321,453	3,943,683
(Emirate of Sharjah) Sharjah	78,790	228,317	402,792	793,573	1,808,000
(Emirate of Ajman) Ajman	16,690	54,546	121,491	206,997	504,846
(Emirate of Umm Al Quwain) Umm Al-Quwain	6,908	19,285	35,361	49,159	49,159
(Emirate of Ras Al Khaimah) Ras Al-Khaimah	43,845	96,578	143,334	210,063	400,000
(Emirate of Fujairah) Fujairah	16,655	43,753	76,180	125,698	316,790
UAE	557,887	1,379,303	2,411,041	4,106,427	11,350,000.

=== Age structure ===
UAE Census (05/12/2005)

Age group	Male	Female	Total	%
Total	2 806 141	1 300 286	4 106 427	100
0-4	145 601	136 538	282 139	6.87
5-9	139 929	129 453	269 382	6.56
10-14	130 778	118 279	249 057	6.07
15-19	121 388	110 838	232 226	5.66
20-24	272 036	161 530	433 566	10.56
25-29	483 657	178 137	661 794	16.12
30-34	489 879	150 482	640 361	15.59
35-39	386 762	113 844	500 606	12.19
40-44	262 718	78 543	341 261	8.31
45-49	174 459	51 311	225 770	5.50
50-54	107 339	31 539	138 878	3.38
55-59	51 303	15 804	67 107	1.63
60-64	18 820	8 527	27 347	0.67
65-69	9 172	5 285	14 457	0.35
70-74	5 391	4 013	9 404	0.23
75-79	2 440	1 837	4 277	0.10
80-84	1 537	1 439	2 976	0.07
85+	1 250	1 165	2 415	0.06
unknown	1 682	1 722	3 404	0.08
Age group	Male	Female	Total	Percent
0-14	416 308	384 270	800 578	19.50
15-64	2 366 679	898 833	3 265 512	79.52
65+	21 472	15 461	36 933	0.90

== Vital statistics ==
=== UN estimates ===
Period	Live births per year	Deaths per year	Natural change per year	CBR	CDR	NC	TFR	IMR
1950–1955	4,000	2,000	2,000	49.4	20.8	28.6	6.97	175
1955–1960	4,000	2,000	3,000	49.3	18.0	31.3	6.97	156
1960–1965	5,000	2,000	4,000	46.3	13.2	33.2	6.87	120
1965–1970	8,000	2,000	6,000	41.2	8.7	32.5	6.77	77
1970–1975	12,000	2,000	10,000	32.6	6.4	26.2	6.36	51
1975–1980	23,000	4,000	19,000	29.1	4.6	24.5	5.66	36
1980–1985	36,000	4,000	32,000	30.5	3.7	26.8	5.23	25
1985–1990	45,000	5,000	40,000	28.4	3.1	25.4	4.83	17
1990–1995	48,000	5,000	42,000	23.0	2.5	20.4	3.88	12
1995–2000	49,000	6,000	43,000	18.1	2.1	16.0	2.97	10
2000–2005	57,000	6,000	51,000	16.2	1.7	14.4	2.38	8
2005–2010	81,000	8,000	73,000	14.0	1.4	12.6	1.86	7
CBR = crude birth rate (per 1000); CDR = crude death rate (per 1000); NC = natural change (per 1000); IMR = infant mortality rate per 1000 births; TFR = total fertility rate (number of children per woman)

Source: United National World Population Prospects

=== Registered births and deaths ===
Year	Population	Live births	Deaths	Natural change	Crude birth rate (per 1000)	Crude death rate (per 1000)	Natural change (per 1000)	Total fertility rate	Emirati Fertility Rate
1976	646,900	21,394			33.1				
1977	748,100	23,119			30.9				
1978	852,200	27,645			32.4				
1979	952,000	31,685			33.3				
1980	1,042,000	34,774			33.4				
1981	1,121,000	38,547			34.4				
1982	1,190,000	41,961			35.3				
1983	1,253,000	43,419			34.7				
1984	1,318,000	43,704			33.2				
1985	1,391,000	44,192			31.8				
1986	1,472,000	45,460	3,222	42,238	30.9	2.2	28.7		
1987	1,561,000	47,703	3,231	44,472	30.6	2.1	28.5		
1988	1,656,000	50,836	3,447	47,389	30.7	2.1	28.6		
1989	1,756,000	51,903	3,640	48,263	29.6	2.1	27.5		
1990	1,860,000	52,264	3,938	48,326	28.1	2.1	26.0		
1991	1,970,000	49,496	4,026	45,470	25.4	2.0	23.4		
1992	2,087,000	50,604	4,271	46,333	24.2	2.0	22.2		
1993	2,207,000	50,197	4,342	45,855	22.7	2.0	20.7		
1994	2,329,000	52,440	4,584	47,856	22.5	2.0	20.5		
1995	2,449,000	48,567	4,779	43,788	19.8	2.0	17.8		
1996	2,571,000	47,050	4,785	42,265	18.3	1.9	16.4		
1997	2,700,000	46,360	4,878	41,482	17.2	1.8	15.4		
1998	2,838,000	48,136	5,033	43,103	17.0	1.8	15.2		
1999	2,988,000	49,659	5,194	44,465	16.6	1.7	14.9		
2000	3,155,000	53,686	5,396	48,290	17.0	1.7	15.3		
2001	3,326,000	56,136	5,777	50,359	16.9	1.7	15.2		
2002	3,507,000	58,070	5,994	52,075	16.6	1.7	14.9		
2003	3,742,000	61,165	6,002	55,163	16.3	1.6	14.7		
2004	4,088,000	63,113	6,123	56,990	15.4	1.5	13.9		
2005	4,580,000	64,623	6,361	58,262	14.1	1.4	12.7		
2006	5,242,000	62,960	6,483	56,477	12.0	1.2	10.8		
2007	6,044,000	67,677	7,414	60,263	11.2	1.2	10.0		
2008	6,894,000	68,779	7,755	61,024	9.9	1.1	8.8		
2009	7,666,000	76,366	7,789	68,577	10.0	1.0	9.0		
2010	8,271,000	79,625	7,414	72,211	9.6	0.9	8.7		
2011	8,672,000	83,950	7,350	76,600	9.7	0.8	8.9		
2012	8,900,000	89,578	7,702	81,876	10.1	0.9	9.2		
2013	9,006,000	93,539	8,015	88,524	10.4	0.9	9.5		
2014	9,071,000	95,860	8,265	87,595	10.6	0.9	9.7		
2015	9,154,000	97,328	8,755	88,573	10.6	1.0	9.6		3.7
2016	9,121,200	98,299	8,988	89,311	10.8	1.0	9.8		
2017	9,304,277	97,738	8,826	88,912	10.5	0.9	9.6		
2018	9,366,828	95,309	8,794	86,515	10.2	0.9	9.3		
2019	9,503,738	94,697	9,006	85,691	10.0	1.0	9.0		
2020	9,282,410	97,572	10,357	87,215	10.5	1.1	9.4		
2021	9,861,007	92,777	11,911	80,866	9.7	1.2	8.5	1.494	
2022	10,288,946	96,631	11,762	84,869	9.4	1.1	8.3	1.611	3.1
2023	10,678,556	101,088	11,514	89,574	9.5	1.1	8.4		2.9
2024	11,294,243	106,915	12,741	94,174	9.5	1.1	8.3		2.78 (e)

(e)=estimate

View source data.
View source data.

=== Life expectancy ===
Life expectancy at birth in the United Arab Emirates

Period	Life expectancy in Years	Period	Life expectancy in Years
1950–1955	43.9	1985–1990	70.7
1955–1960	49.6	1990–1995	72.2
1960–1965	54.7	1995–2000	73.6
1965–1970	59.6	2000–2005	74.8
1970–1975	63.4	2005–2010	75.9
1975–1980	66.4	2010–2015	76.7
1980–1985	68.8	2019	78

Source: UN World Population Prospects

== Nationalities ==
The UAE government does not publish demographic data regarding nationality. The table below records estimates of various reliable sources.

UAE population by nationality
Nationals of	Population	Year of data
India	4,300,000	2025
Pakistan	1,700,000	2025
UAE	1,310,000	2025
Bangladesh	1,200,000	2024
Philippines	700,000	2026
Iran	600,000	2025
Nepal	450,000	2025
Egypt	400,000	2022
China	370,000	2025
Sri Lanka	300,000	2021
Afghanistan	300,000	2025
Palestine	300,000	2023
Syria	242,000	2017
United Kingdom	240,000	2026
Jordan	200,000	2024
Ethiopia	200,000	2025
Lebanon	200,000	2025
Sudan	200,000	2023
Uganda	160,000	2024
Russia	150,000	2025
South Africa	100,000	2018
Morocco	100,000	2019
Indonesia	100,000	2019
Nigeria	100,000	2026
Iraq	100,000	2025
Yemen	99,638	2019
Saudi Arabia	85,000	2018
Somalia	80,000–100,000	2018
Turkey	60,000	2025
France	64,000	2026
Canada	60,000	2025
United States	50,000	2018
Kenya	40,000	2025
Tunisia	25,000	2025
Ukraine	30,000	2024
Algeria	30,000	2020
Australia	25,000	2025
Thailand	19,000	2025
Italy	18,671	2024
South Korea	13,000	2019
Brazil	12,000	2022
Germany	10,000	2022

== Languages ==
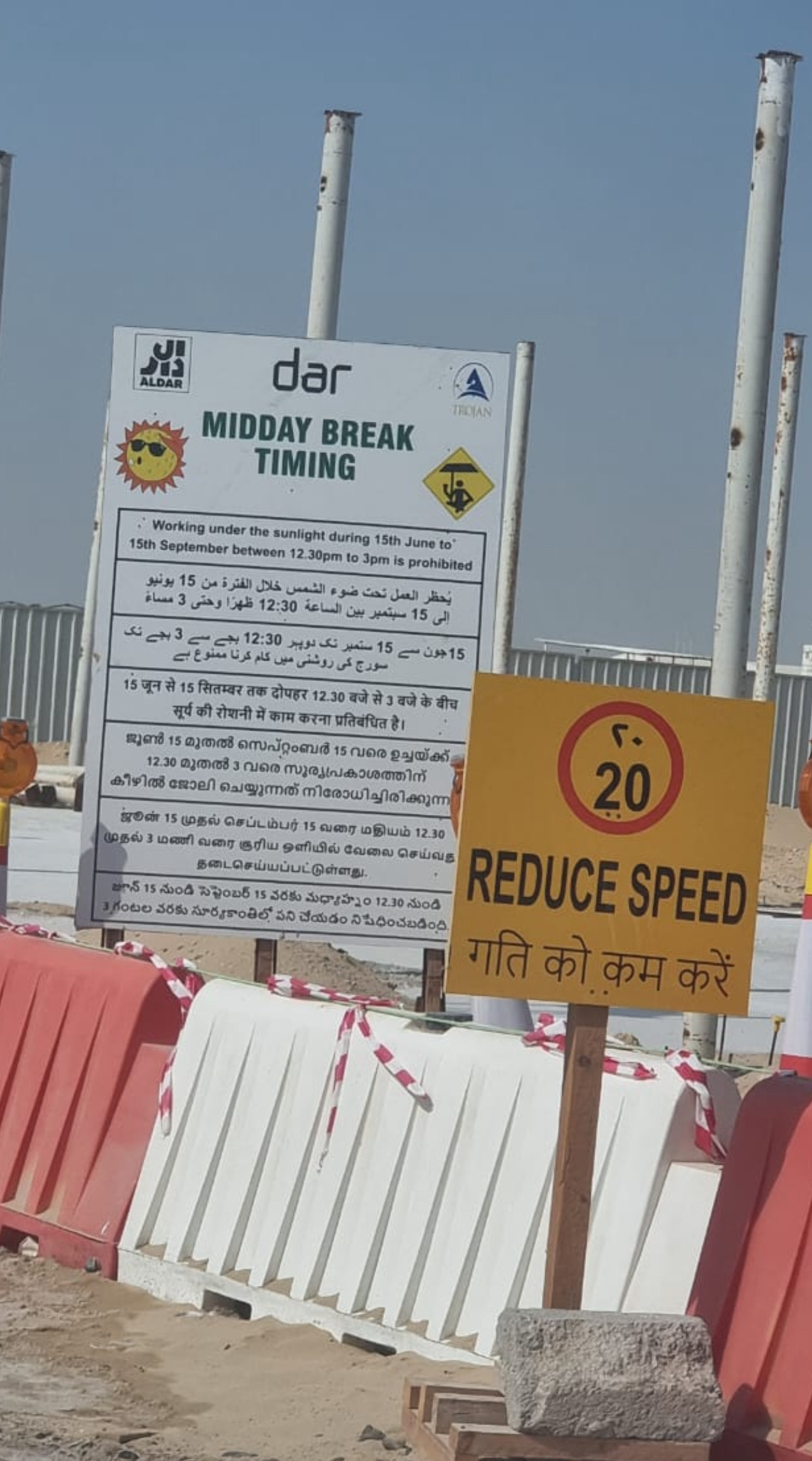
Multilingual signboard featuring English, Arabic, Urdu, Hindi, Malayalam, Tamil, and Telugu.

Most spoken languages in the UAE (>100k users)
Language	Number of speakers (all users)
Gulf Arabic	3,480,000
Modern Standard Arabic	3,090,000
Malayalam	1,060,000
South Levantine Arabic	499,000
Telugu	485,000
Tamil	455,000
Northern Pashto	379,000
Southern Balochi	379,000
Hejazi Arabic	370,000
Kannada	337,000
Tagalog	303,000
Omani Arabic	303,000
Iranian Persian	303,000
Egyptian Arabic	284,000
French language	250,000
Eastern Punjabi	201,000
Southern Pashto	144,000
North Levantine Arabic	127,000
Sinhala	121,000
Sindhi	102,000

Arabic is the official language. Emirati people speak Gulf Arabic. English is the most used language amongst expatriates and in business. Arabic is the main medium of instruction at all levels of schooling in government schools, while English is taught as a second language and used for teaching technical or scientific subjects. Private schools can follow a different curriculum (British, American, French, Pakistani, etc.) and use a different language. Many other languages are spoken in the UAE due to immigration (see table). In 2019, Abu Dhabi included Hindi as third official court language. Currently, the UAE government provides lectures and tests to obtain a driving license in Urdu, Hindi, Malayalam, Tamil and Bengali, besides Arabic and English.

== Religions ==
Religion in the United Arab Emirates (2020 estimate)
1. Islam (official) (74.5%)
2. Christianity (12.9%)
3. Hinduism (6.20%)
4. Buddhism (3.20%)
5. Agnosticism (1.30%)
6. Other religion (1.90%)

Per the United Arab Emirates constitution, Islam is the official religion. 75% of the population were Muslim as of 2020. 63% are Sunni, 7% are Shia and 4% follow another branch of Islam. The royals families of Al Nahyan and Al Maktoum ruling families adhere to the Maliki school of jurisprudence. As such, the Maliki school remains the UAE's dominant school of thought and is sometimes used in legal sharia rulings. The other main religions present in the country include Christianity (13%), Hinduism (6%), and Buddhism (3%). Zoroastrians, Druze, Baha'i, Judaism, and Sikhism are also practiced by some non-nationals. 1% of the population is agnostic.

== See also ==
- Demographics of Dubai
- Emirati diaspora
