= Irreligion in the United Arab Emirates =

Irreligion in the United Arab Emirates is rare, with only up to 4% of people reporting irreligious beliefs according to a Gallup poll. It is illegal for Muslims, with apostates from Islam facing a maximum sentence of the death penalty under the country's anti-blasphemy law (though this has never resulted in any form of execution in the country's history). As such, there have been questions regarding freedom of religion in the United Arab Emirates.

Atheism in the region is mainly present among foreign expatriates and a very small number of local youth. According to Sultan Sooud Al-Qassemi, due to Islam being founded in the Arabian Peninsula over 1,400 years ago, the Persian Gulf region enjoys a long Islamic history and tradition, and it is strongly associated with national identity; thus, any distancing or criticism of religion "equates to distancing oneself from national identity". Al-Qassemi notes that the use of social media via the internet remains the strongest medium of expression for Gulf atheists, while providing anonymity; a pioneering Gulf blogger is the Emirati atheist Ahmed Ben Kerishan, who is known in the Arabic blogosphere for advocating atheist and secular views.

== See also ==
- Religion in the United Arab Emirates
- Freedom of religion in the United Arab Emirates
- Islam in the United Arab Emirates
- Christianity in the United Arab Emirates
- Hinduism in the United Arab Emirates
- Judaism in the United Arab Emirates
- Demographics of the United Arab Emirates
