= Levantines in the United Arab Emirates =

Levantines in the United Arab Emirates may refer to:

- Jordanians in the United Arab Emirates
- Lebanese people in the United Arab Emirates
- Syrians in the United Arab Emirates
- History of the Jews in the United Arab Emirates

== See also ==
- Expatriates in the United Arab Emirates
