= Religion in Asia =

Religion in Asia-Pacific (2022 estimate)
1. Islam (28.0%)
2. Hinduism (22.8%)
3. Unaffiliated (13.9%)
4. Buddhism (11.1%)
5. Folk Religions (9.70%)
6. Christianity (8.40%)
7. Other (6.10%)

Asia is the largest and most populous continent and the birthplace of many religions including Buddhism, Christianity, Confucianism, Hinduism, Islam, Jainism, Judaism, Shinto, Sikhism, Taoism, Korean shamanism, and Zoroastrianism. All major religious traditions are practiced in the region and new forms are constantly emerging. Asia is noted for its diversity of culture. Hinduism and Islam are the largest religions in Asia with approximately 1.2-1.3 billion adherents each.

== Indian religions ==
Indian religions, also called Dharmic religions are the oldest religions of Asia. All Indian religions originated in the Indian subcontinent. These religions all have the similar concepts like dharma, karma, and reincarnation, but the interpretation of these concepts varies with each religion.

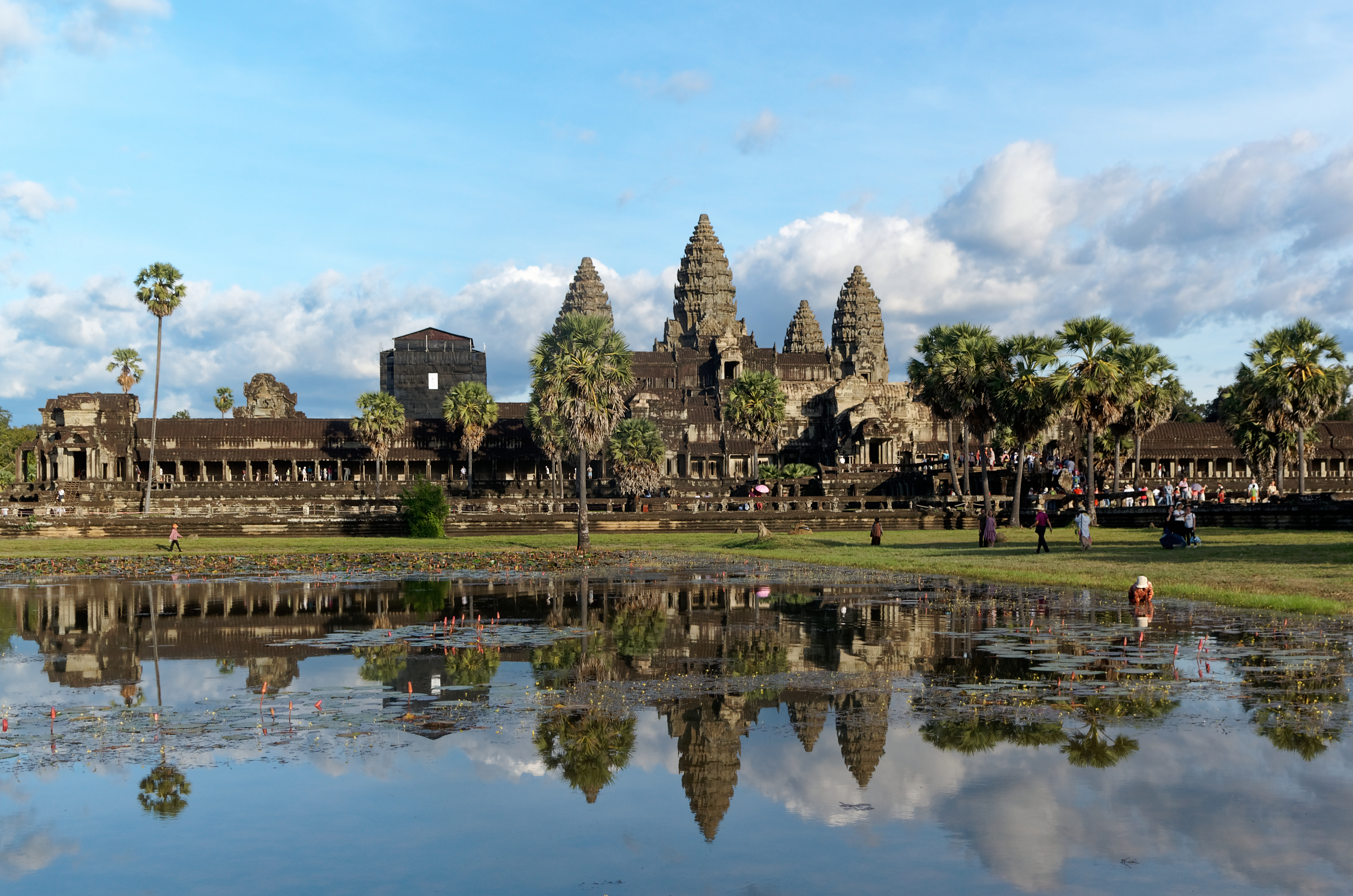
Vrah Viṣṇuloka, Hindu Temple, Cambodia

=== Hinduism ===
Hinduism is the largest religion in Asia with about 1.26 billion followers, mainly in South and Southeast Asia. Hinduism, like all Dharmic religions, originates in India. More than 93% of the global Hindu population live in India. Demographically, it is the largest religion in India (80%), Nepal (85%), and the island of Bali (87%), with strong minorities in the Asian nations of Bhutan, Fiji, Indonesia, Malaysia, Bangladesh, Pakistan, Singapore, Sri Lanka, United Arab Emirates, Oman, Yemen, Russia, Saudi Arabia, Bahrain, Kuwait, Qatar, Myanmar, the Philippines, and Afghanistan. As of 2020, India has a Hindu population of 1.10 billion, Nepal has a Hindu population of 23.5 million, and there are 14.5 million Hindus in Bangladesh.

Hinduism is a fusion that resulted from incorporating the tribal cultures, tribal and folk religions, and tribal deities, Its principles like karma, moksha, rebirth, reincarnation, renunciation, samsara are incorporated into Sramana traditions like Buddhism, Jainism, and the traditions predating the Buddha and Mahavira.

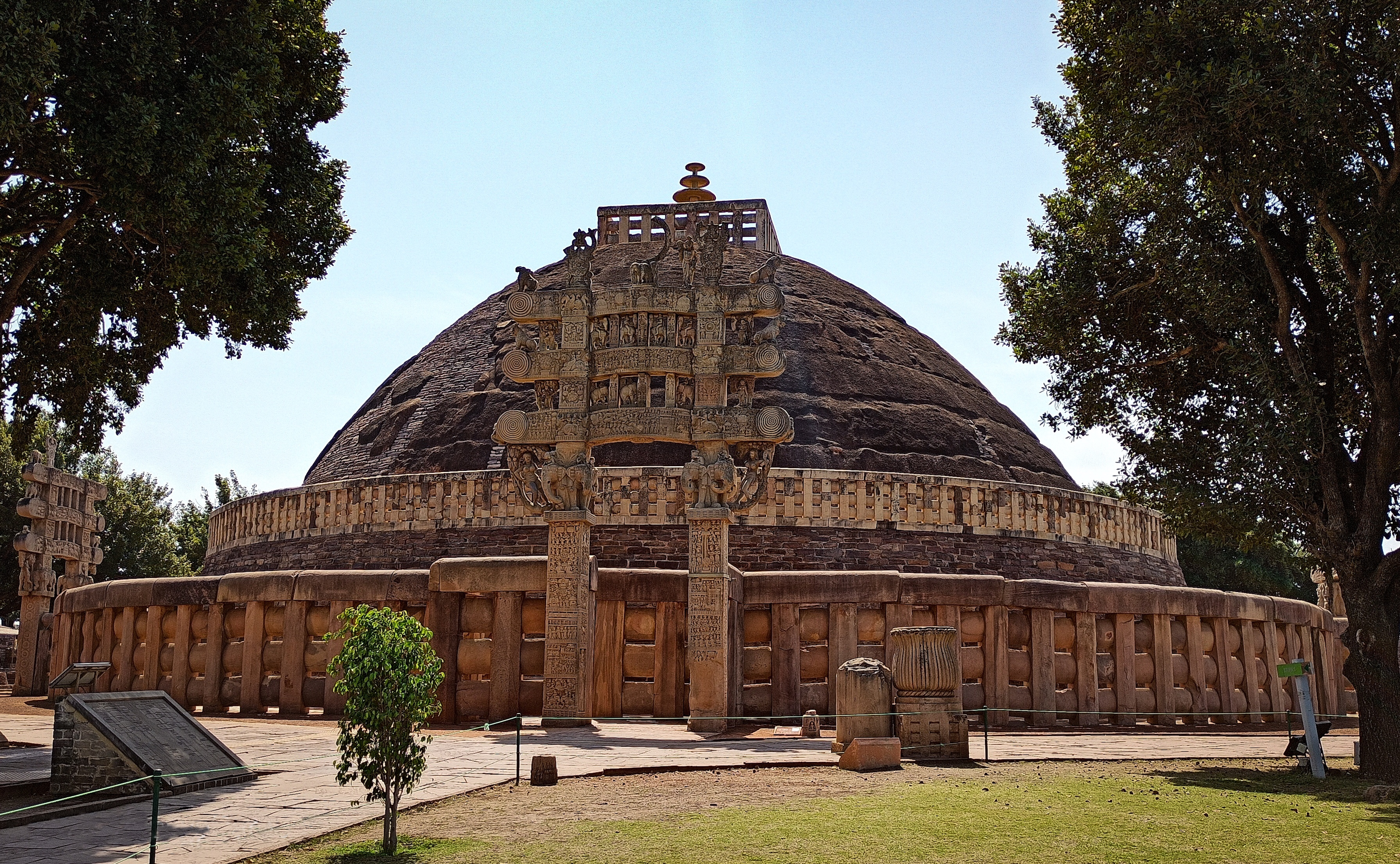
Sanchi Stupa, India

=== Buddhism ===
Buddhism was founded by Siddartha Gautama, who is known as the Buddha. Buddhism is the fourth largest world religion and the third largest religion in Asia, which is adhere by 12% of Asia's population. It is the predominant religion and hold the majority population in Thailand (95%), Myanmar (89%), Cambodia (98%), Sri Lanka (70%), Laos (67%), Mongolia (54%), Japan (20%. - 36% or 67%), Bhutan (75%), Tibet (79%) and Macau (80%). Large Buddhist populations reside in Taiwan (35%), China (4%), Singapore (33%), South Korea (22.9%), Malaysia (19.8%), Hong Kong (15%), North Korea (13.8%), Nepal (10.7%), Vietnam (10%), Ladakh (39.65%) and Sikkim (27.39%). There are also strong Buddhist minorities in India, Indonesia, Brunei, the Philippines, Bangladesh and Russia.

Before the advent of Islam, Buddhism was one of the most widely practiced religions in Central Asia, Afghanistan, Malaysia, the Philippines, and Indonesia.

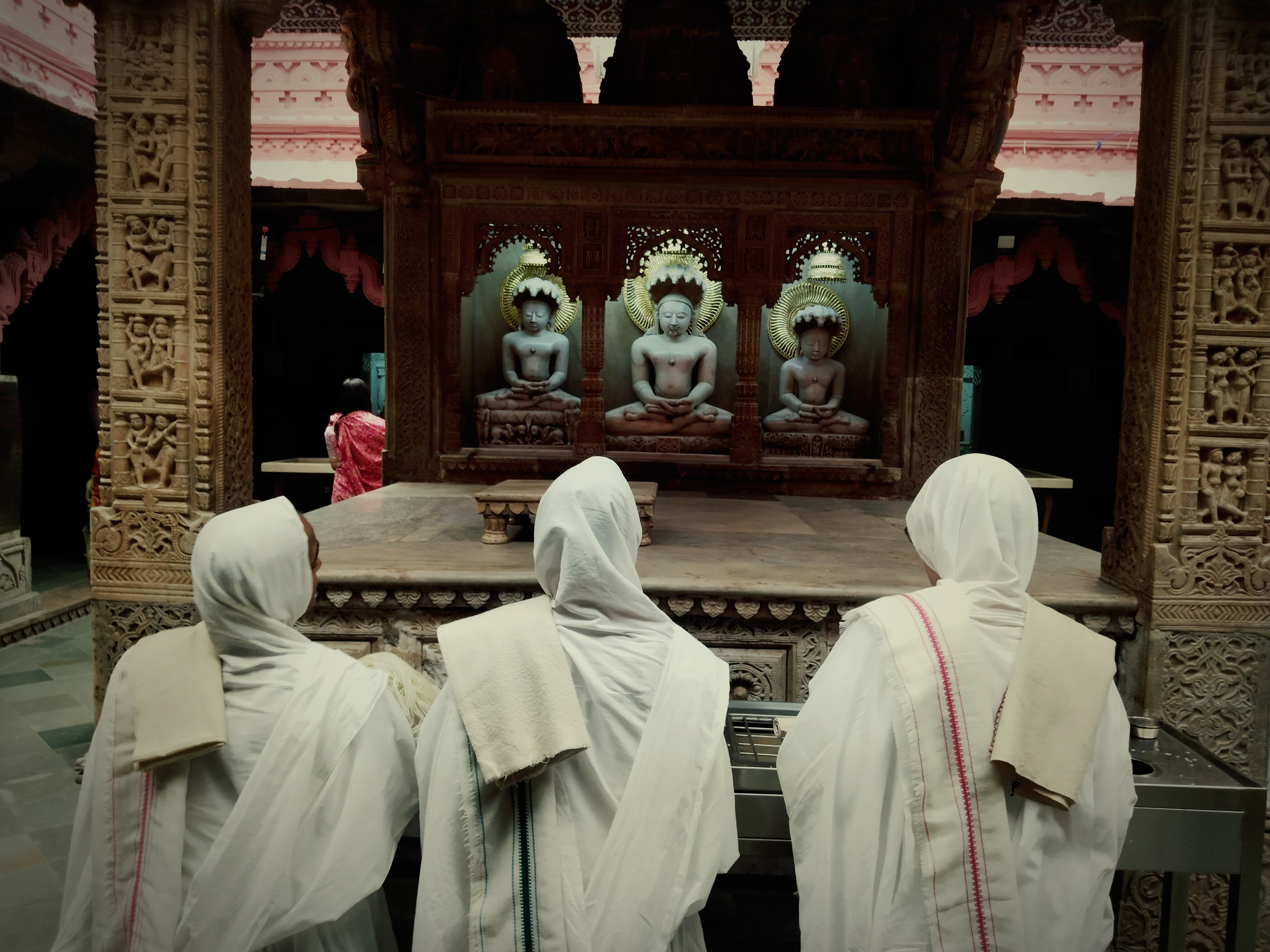
Sanganer Jain Temple, India

=== Jainism ===
Jainism is an Indian religion. Jains are mostly found in India but are increasingly found throughout the world. Jains have significantly influenced and contributed to ethical, political and economic spheres in India. Jains have an ancient tradition of scholarship and have the highest degree of literacy for a religious community in India. Jain libraries are the oldest in the country. It has traditionally been confined to the Indian subcontinent. It is based on the teachings of Vardhaman Mahavir and also on 23 other Tirthankaras.

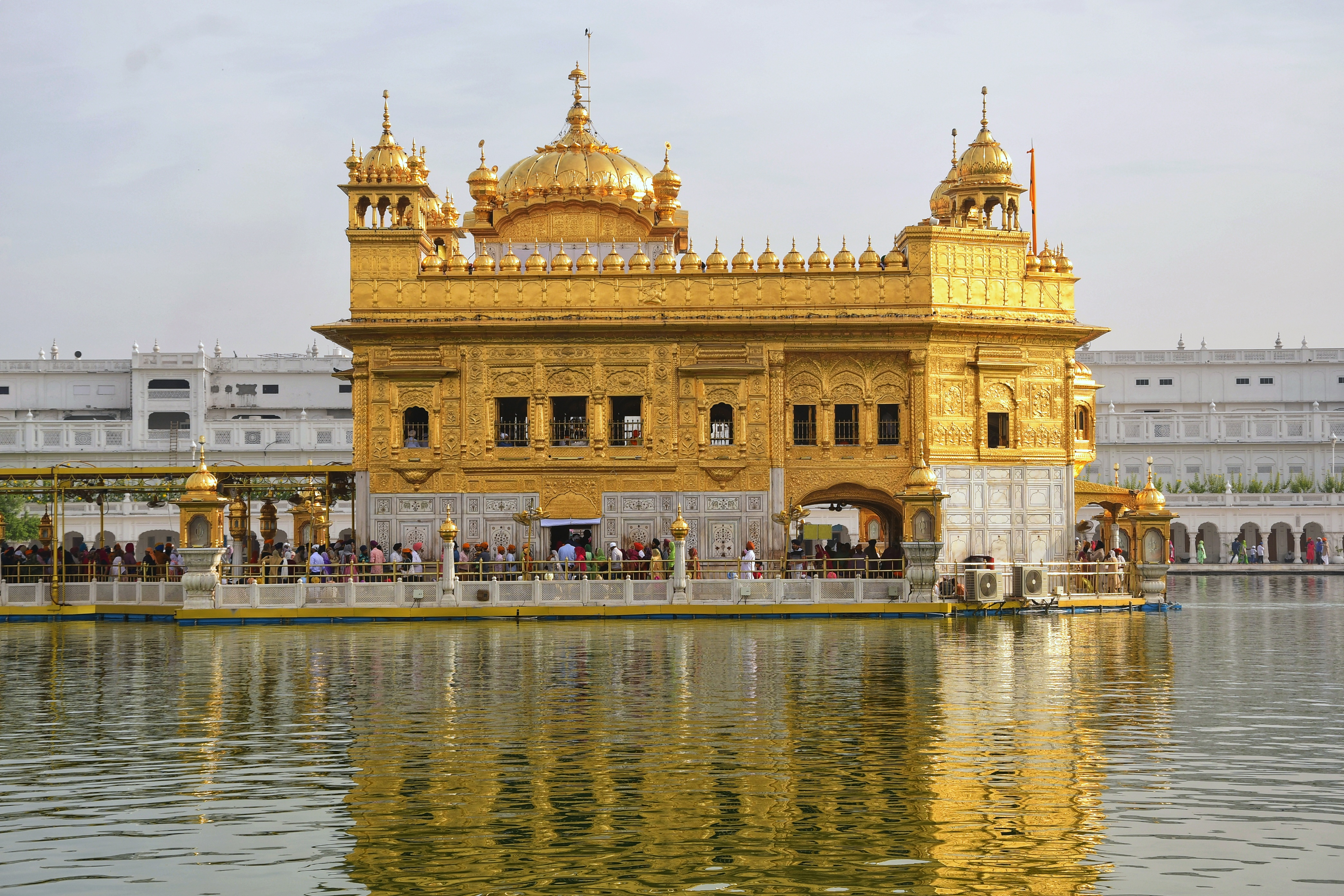
Golden Temple, India

=== Sikhism ===
Sikhism is the fifth largest organized religion in the world, with approximately 30 million adherents. And one of the most steadily growing. It is a monotheistic religion founded by Guru Nanak Dev in the 1500s. The religion professes its roots in the area of Punjab region, in the northern part of the Indian subcontinent.

This system of religious philosophy and expression has been traditionally known as the Gurmat (literally the counsel of the gurus) or the Sikh Dharm. Sikhism originated from the word Sikh, which in turn comes from the Sanskrit root śhiṣhya meaning "disciple" or "learner", or śhikṣha meaning "instruction".

Sikhism is the 4th largest religion in India with 2% of the total population being Sikh. There is also a large concentration of Sikhs in Malaysia, Thailand, Myanmar, the Philippines, Pakistan, Afghanistan, Hong Kong, Singapore, Indonesia, Kuwait and U.A.E.

== Abrahamic religions ==
=== Judaism ===
Judaism is the predominant religion in Israel (75.6%), which has a nominal Jewish population of about 6.1 million.

Outside of Israel there are small diaspora communities of Jewish people living in Palestine (432,800), Turkey (17,400), Azerbaijan (9,100), Iran (8,756), India (5,000) and Uzbekistan (4,000).

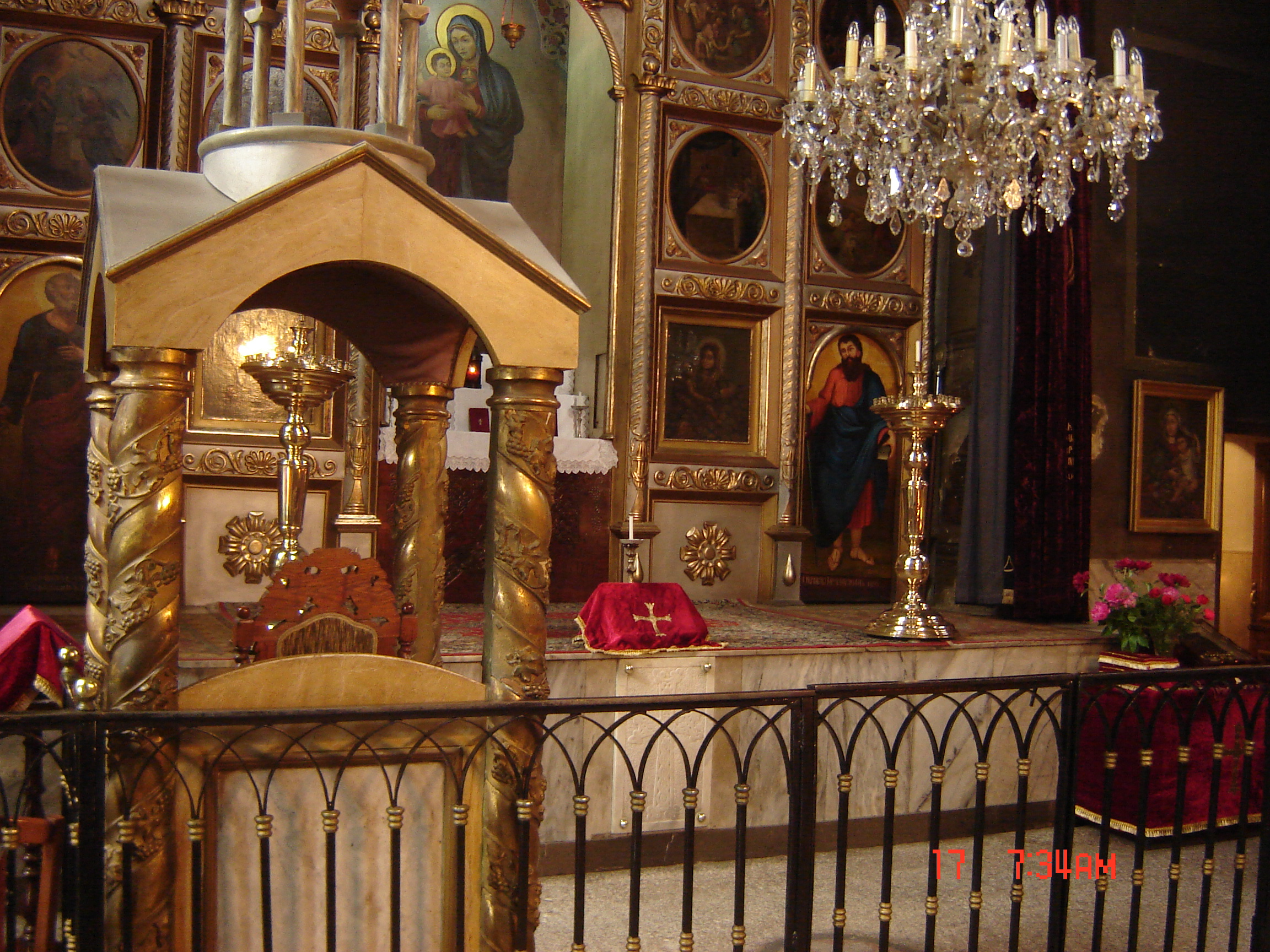
St. Kevork Armenian Apostolic Church, Tbilisi, Georgia

=== Christianity ===
Christianity is an Abrahamic monotheistic religion based on the life and teachings of Jesus of Nazareth. Its adherents, known as Christians, believe that Jesus is the Christ, whose coming as the Messiah was prophesied in the Hebrew Bible, called the Old Testament in Christianity, and chronicled in the New Testament which are brought together in the Christian Bible as canonical scripture. It is the world's largest religion with about 2.4 billion followers and is culturally and traditionally diverse. Christianity is a widespread minority religion in Asia with more than 286 million adherents according to Pew Research Center in 2010, and nearly 364 million according to Britannica Book of the Year 2014 constituting around 8.5% of the total population of Asia.

Only six countries are predominantly Christian: Asian Russia which predominantly adheres to the Russian Orthodox Church; Cyprus, which is predominantly Orthodox; the Philippines, which is the third-largest Roman Catholic nation in the world; Timor Leste, which is the most overwhelming Christian (99.6%) and Roman Catholic nation in Asia (97.6%); Armenia, which was the first state to adopt a Christian denomination as its state religion; and Georgia (88.1). Christianity also accounts for 29.2% of South Korea's population (54.5% of its religious population) and is now the predominant religion in South Korea, Christianity is also a large minority religion in Lebanon accounting for 40% of its population. Christianity is also a large minority religion in Kazakhstan (26%), Singapore (18.3%), and Kyrgyzstan (17%).

Asian countries with large Christian populations are Philippines (84 million), China (68 million), India (30 million), Indonesia (28 million), Kazakhstan (4.7 million), South Korea (15 million), Vietnam (7 million), Georgia (4.6 million), Armenia (3.2 million), Malaysia (2.6 million), Japan (2.5 million), Pakistan (2.5 million), Uzbekistan (2.5 million), Syria (1.8 million), Sri Lanka (1.5 million), East Timor (1.2 million) and Taiwan (one million).

There are still large ancient communities of Middle Eastern Christians and Arab Christians in Lebanon, Iraq, Iran, Turkey, Syria, Jordan, Israel and Palestine numbering more than 3 million in West Asia. There are also a large populations of expatriate workers which include a sizeable Christian communities live in Arabian Peninsula numbering more than 3 million.

=== Islam ===
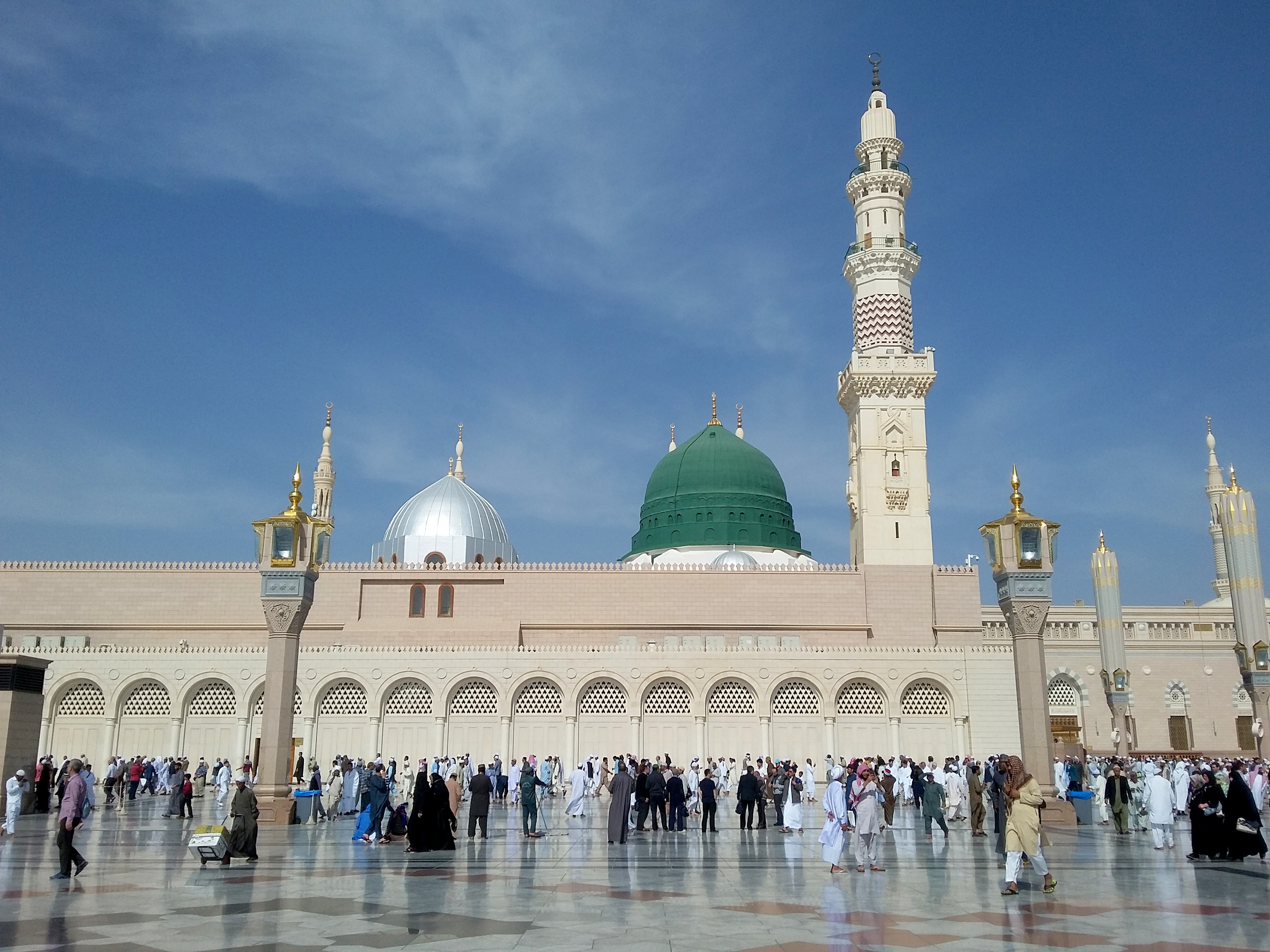
Prophet's Mosque in Medina, Saudi Arabia

Islam is a monotheistic and Abrahamic religion articulated by the Qur'an, a book considered by its adherents to be the verbatim word of God (Allāh) and by the teachings and normative example (called the Sunnah and composed of hadith) of Muhammad, considered by them to be the last prophet of God. Islam is the largest religion in Asia with about 1.2 billion adherents. Asia constitute in absolute terms the world's Muslim population. South and Southeast Asia are home of the most populous Muslim countries, with Indonesia, Pakistan, India, and Bangladesh having more than 100 million adherents. According to U.S. government figures, in 2006 there were 20 million Muslims in China. In Western Asia, the non-Arab countries of Iran and Turkey are the largest Muslim-majority countries. In South Asia, Pakistan and Bangladesh are the countries with the largest Muslim-majority. In Central Asia, Afghanistan and Uzbekistan are the countries with the largest Muslim-majority.

Indonesia is 86% Muslim and is the country with the largest Muslim population in the world, Pakistan is 97% Muslim, Bangladesh is 89% and Malaysia is 65%. India's Muslim population is 14% of the total, approximately 200 million people, which grew because of pluralist mindset of native Indian religions. Around 6-11 percent, some 6 - 12 million people in the Philippines are Muslim. Thailand's Muslims make up 4.6 percent of the population, or approximately 3 million people. Also Sri Lanka's Muslims make up 10 percent of the population, or approximately 2.5 million people

Bangladesh, Malaysia, Indonesia, Brunei, Kazakhstan, Qatar, Kuwait, Pakistan, Afghanistan, Uzbekistan, Maldives, Tajikistan, Turkmenistan, Iraq, Iran, Syria, Saudi Arabia, Bahrain, Yemen, United Arab Emirates, Oman, Turkey, Azerbaijan, Kyrgyzstan, Jordan, Palestine and Lebanon are the 27 Muslim majority states in Asia.

=== Baháʼí Faith ===
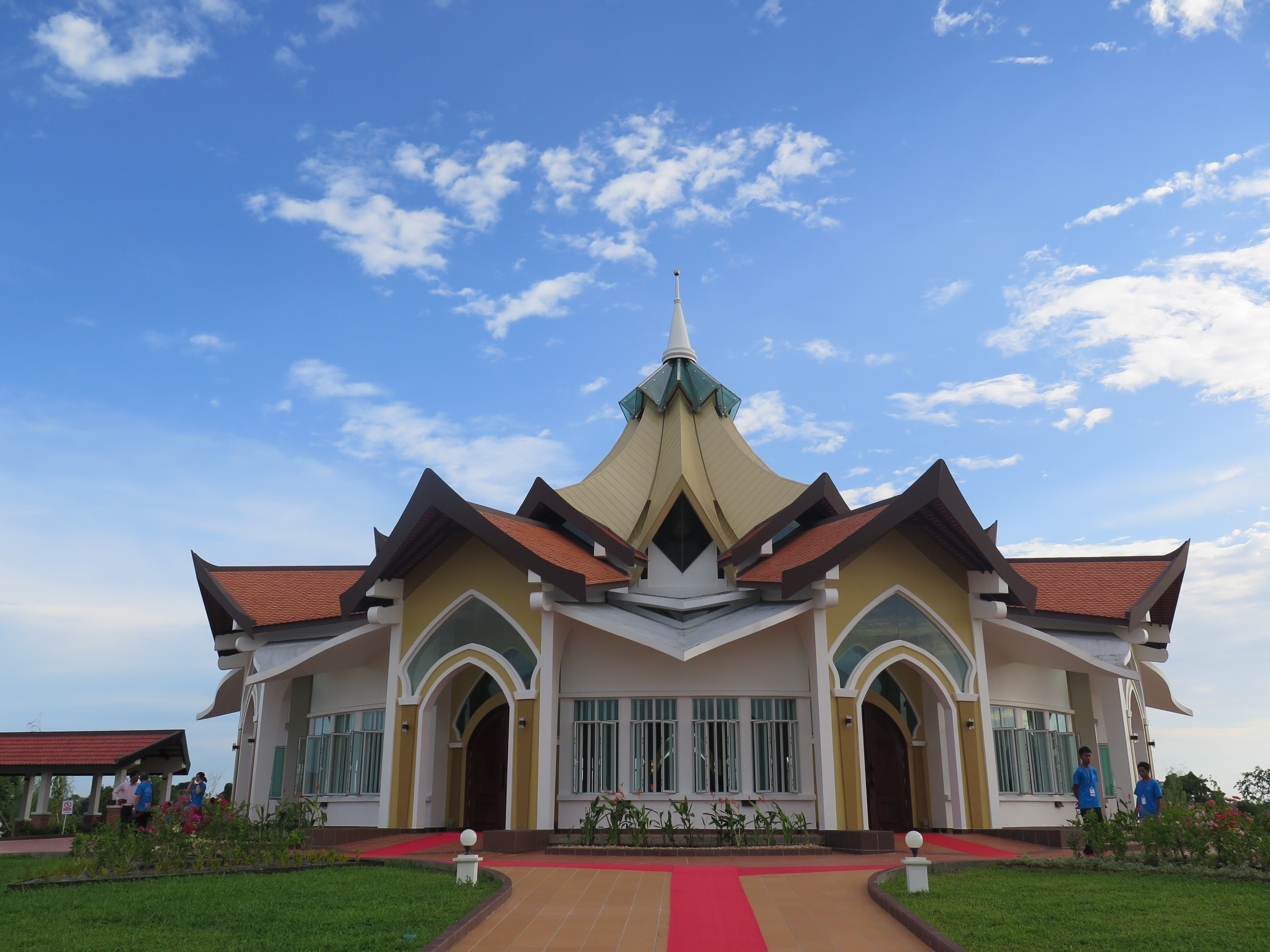
Baháʼí Temple (Battambang, Cambodia)

The Baháʼí Faith is an Abrahamic religion although it is quite different from Christianity, Islam, and Judaism. It was so founded by Bahá'u'lláh in what was then Persia (also known as Iran). Today the largest national population of Baháʼís is in India with between 1.7 million to over 2 million, where there is also the Lotus Temple. Significant populations are found in many countries including Vietnam and Malaysia where "about 1%", some 260,000, of the population are Baháʼís. In other places, like Kazakhstan there are 25 Local Spiritual Assemblies.

In modern-day Iran, the religion is severely persecuted (see Persecution of Baháʼís). In neighboring Turkmenistan, Baháʼí Faith is effectively banned, and individuals have had their homes raided for Baháʼí literature.

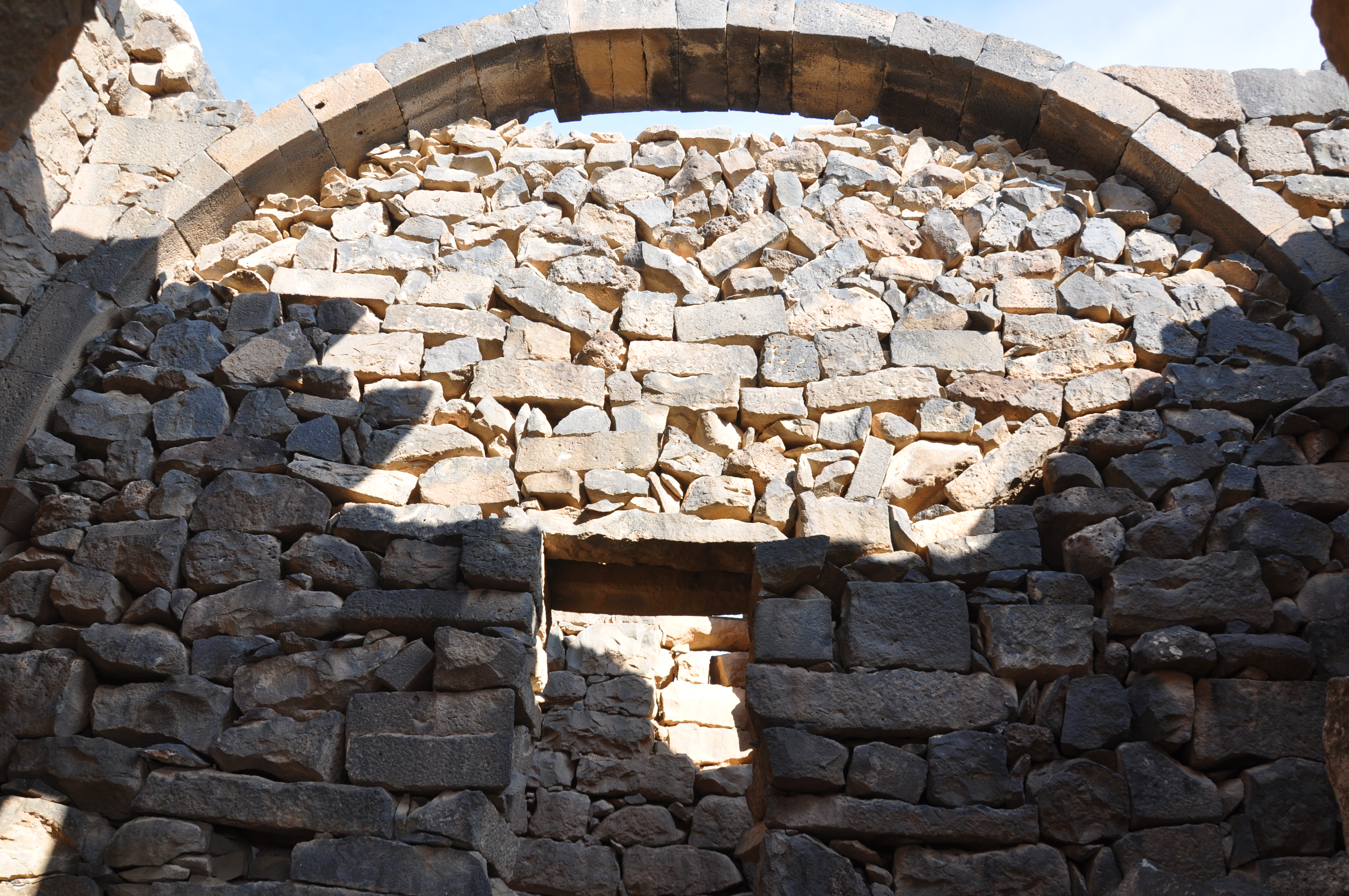
Druze Arch

=== Druze ===
Druze are an Arabic-speaking esoteric ethnoreligious group originating in Western Asia who self-identify as The People of Monotheism (Al-Muwaḥḥidūn). Jethro of Midian is considered an ancestor of Druze, who revere him as their spiritual founder and chief prophet. It is a monotheistic and Abrahamic religion based on the teachings of Hamza ibn Ali ibn Ahmad and the sixth Fatimid caliph, al-Hakim bi-Amr Allah, and Ancient Greek philosophers such as Plato, Aristotle, Pythagoras, and Zeno of Citium. Druze do not identify as Muslims.

The number of Druze people worldwide is between 800,000 and one million, with the vast majority residing in the Levant. The Institute of Druze Studies estimates that 40–50% of Druze live in Syria, 30–40% in Lebanon, 6–7% in Israel, and 1–2% in Jordan. About 2% of the Druze population are also scattered within other countries in the Middle East.

The Lebanese Druze are believed to constitute about 5.2 percent or 250,000, Syrian Druze are believed to constitute an estimated 3.2 percent of the population (as of 2010), or approximately 700,000 persons (including residents of the Golan Heights). In 2019, there were 143,000 Druze living in Israel, 1.6% of the total population of the country. The Jordanian Druze are believed to constitute about 0.5% of the total population of Jordan, which is around 32,000.

== East Asian religions ==
East Asian religions (also known as Far Eastern religions, Chinese religions, or Taoic religions) form a subset of the Eastern religions. Shamanism and animism have historically been practised in Asia, and is still practiced in most of Asia.

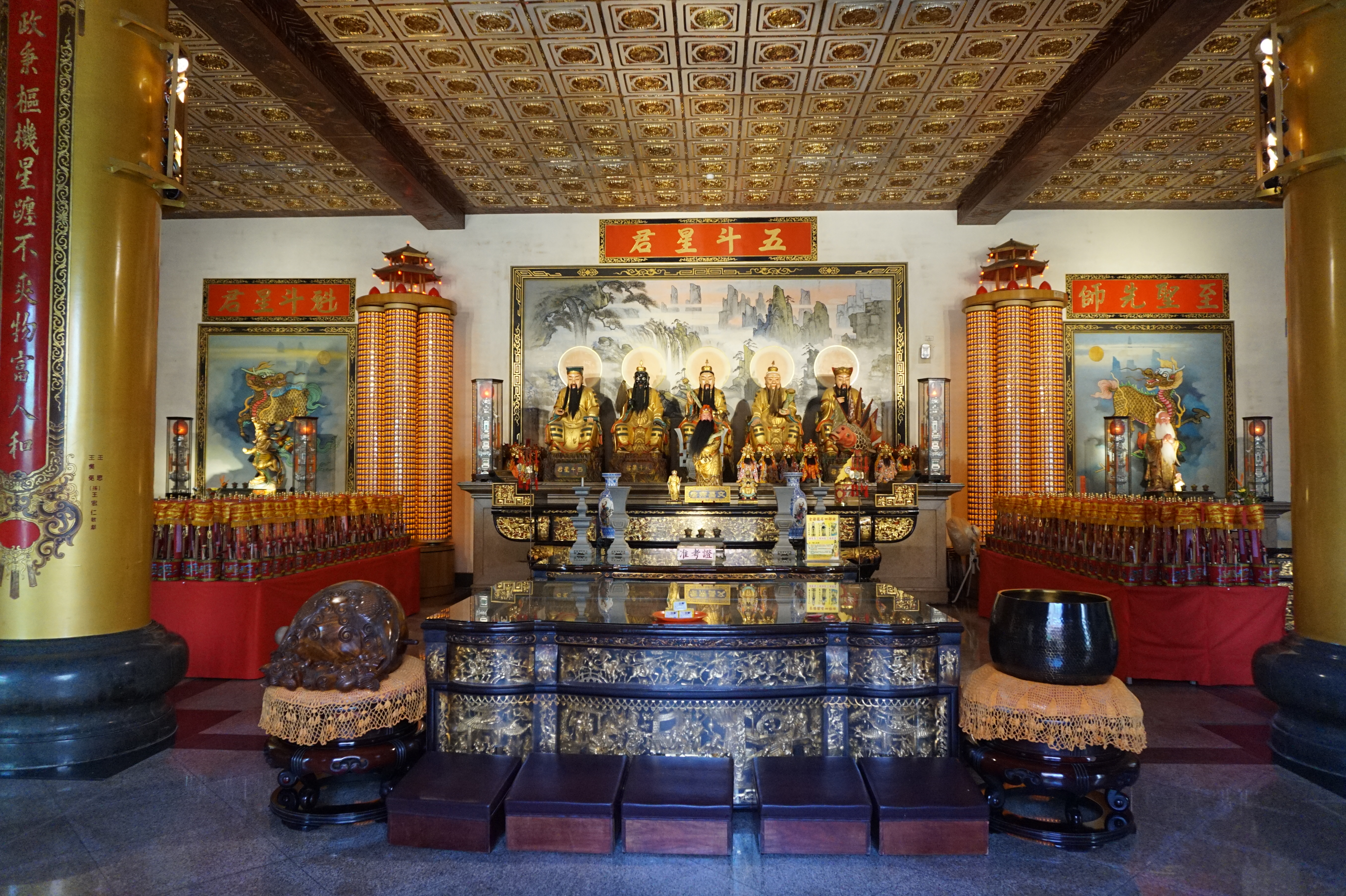
Hall of Wenchang Wangs in Yuanbao Temple, Taichung

=== Confucianism ===
Confucianism was founded in ancient China by Confucius (551 B.C.E. - 479). Confucianism is a complex of moral, social, political, philosophical, and religious concerns that permeated the culture and history of East Asia. Confucianism emphasizes family, social hierarchy, and personal integrity and is manifested in practices and attitudes rather than institutions and is centered on the family and local society. It was, however, considered the state religion of East Asian countries in some periods. Today the Chinese, Korean, Japanese and Vietnamese diasporas have brought Confucianism to all parts of the world.

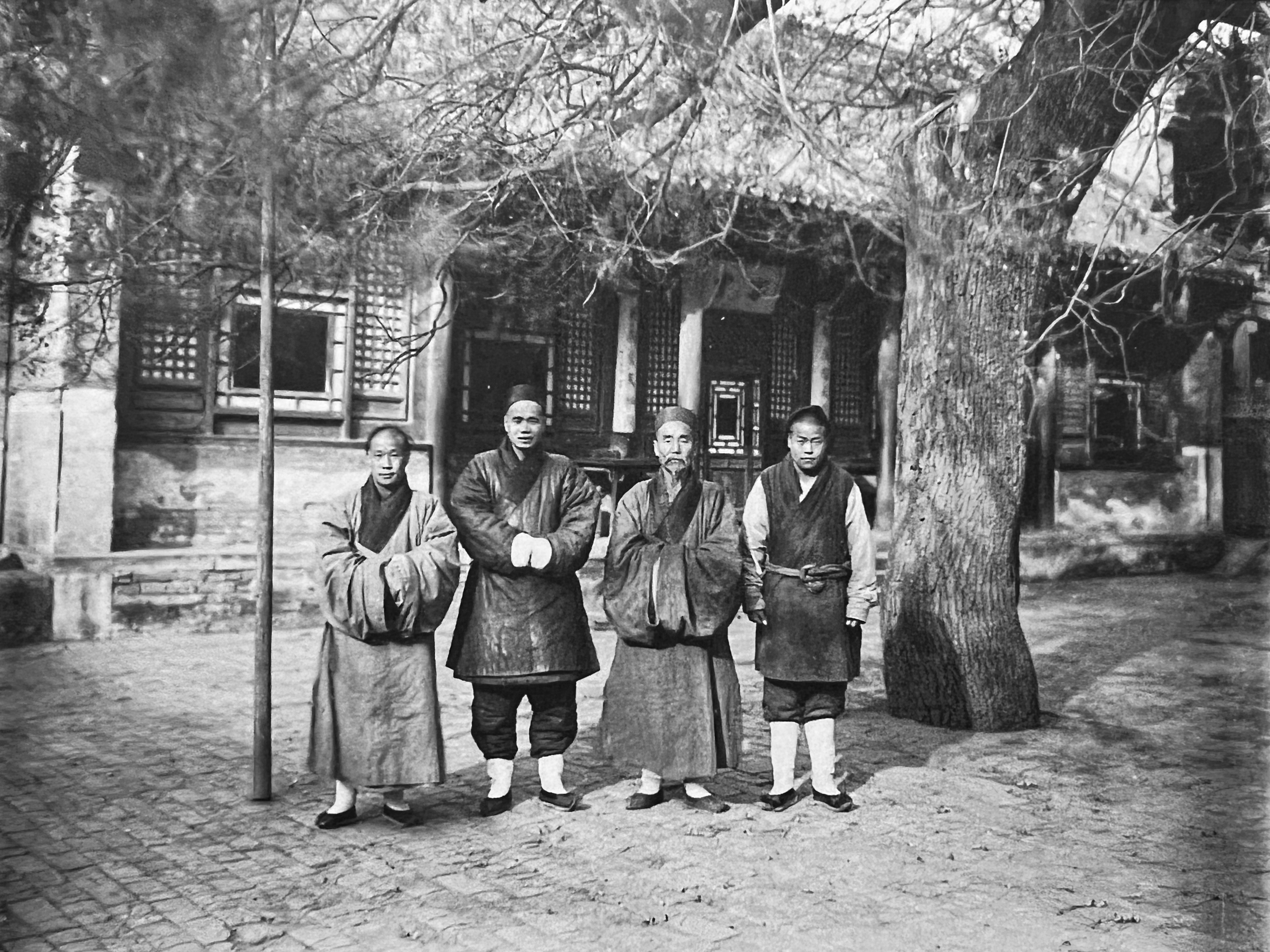
Taoist Priests in White Cloud Temple Beijing Qing Dynasty

=== Taoism ===
Taoism (also romanized Daoism) is a diverse philosophical and religious tradition that emphasizes living in harmony with the Tao (also romanized "Dao"), a term that means "Way", "Path" or "Principle". The concept is shared with other Chinese philosophies and religions. In Taoism, however, Tao denotes both the source and the driving force inherent in everything that exists. It is ultimately ineffable: "The Tao that can be told is not the eternal Tao."

Laozi is traditionally regarded as the founder of Taoism and is closely associated with "original", or "primordial", Taoism. Whether he actually existed is commonly disputed; however, the work attributed to him – the Daodejing – is dated to the late 4th century BC.

Taoist propriety and ethics vary according to the particular school, but in general tends to emphasize wu-wei (action through non-action), "naturalness", simplicity, spontaneity, and the Three Treasures: compassion, moderation, and humility.

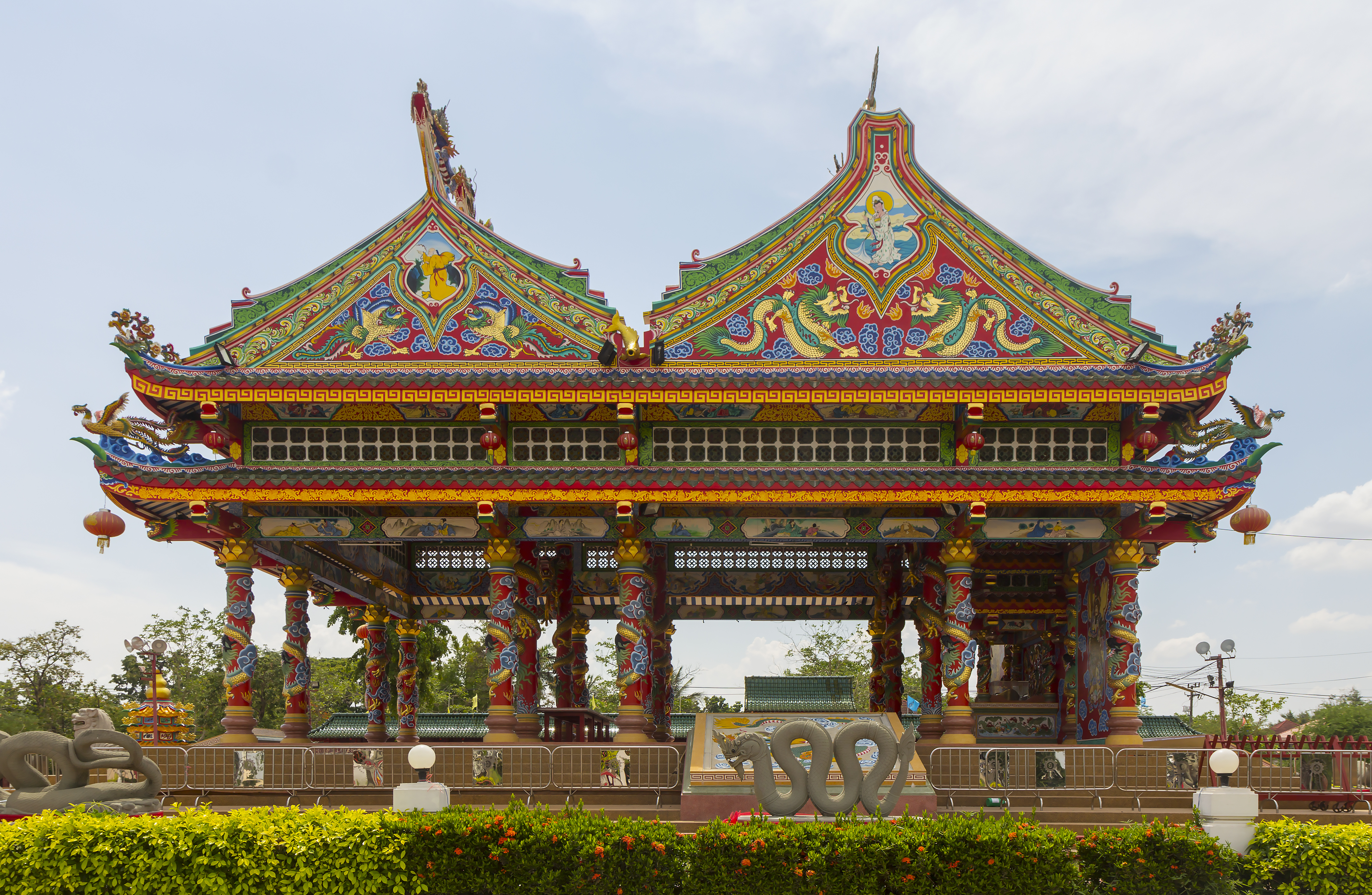
Udon Thani - Chinese Shrine

Significant Taoist communities can be found in China, Taiwan, Hong Kong, Singapore, Malaysia, Korea, Japan, Vietnam and among the Chinese, Korean, Japanese and Vietnamese diaspora communities.

=== Chinese folk religion ===
Chinese folk religion is a label used to describe the ethnic religious traditions which have been a main belief system in China and among the Han Chinese ethnic group for most of the civilization's history. This group of diverse beliefs comprises Chinese mythology and includes the worship of various Shen (神, shén; "deities", "spirits", "awarenesses", "consciousnesses", "archetypes") which can be nature deities, Taizu or clan deities, city deities, national deities, cultural heroes and demigods, dragons and ancestors. Chinese folk religion is sometimes categorized with Taoism, since over the world institutional Taoism has been attempting to assimilate or administer local religions. More accurately, Taoism can be defined as a component of Chinese religion, since it sprang out of folk religion and Chinese philosophy. Chinese folk religion is sometimes seen as a constituent part of Chinese traditional religion, but more often, the two are regarded as synonymous. With around 454 million adherents or about 6.6% of the world population, Chinese folk religion is one of the major religious traditions in the world. In China more than 30% of the population adheres to folk religions or Taoism.

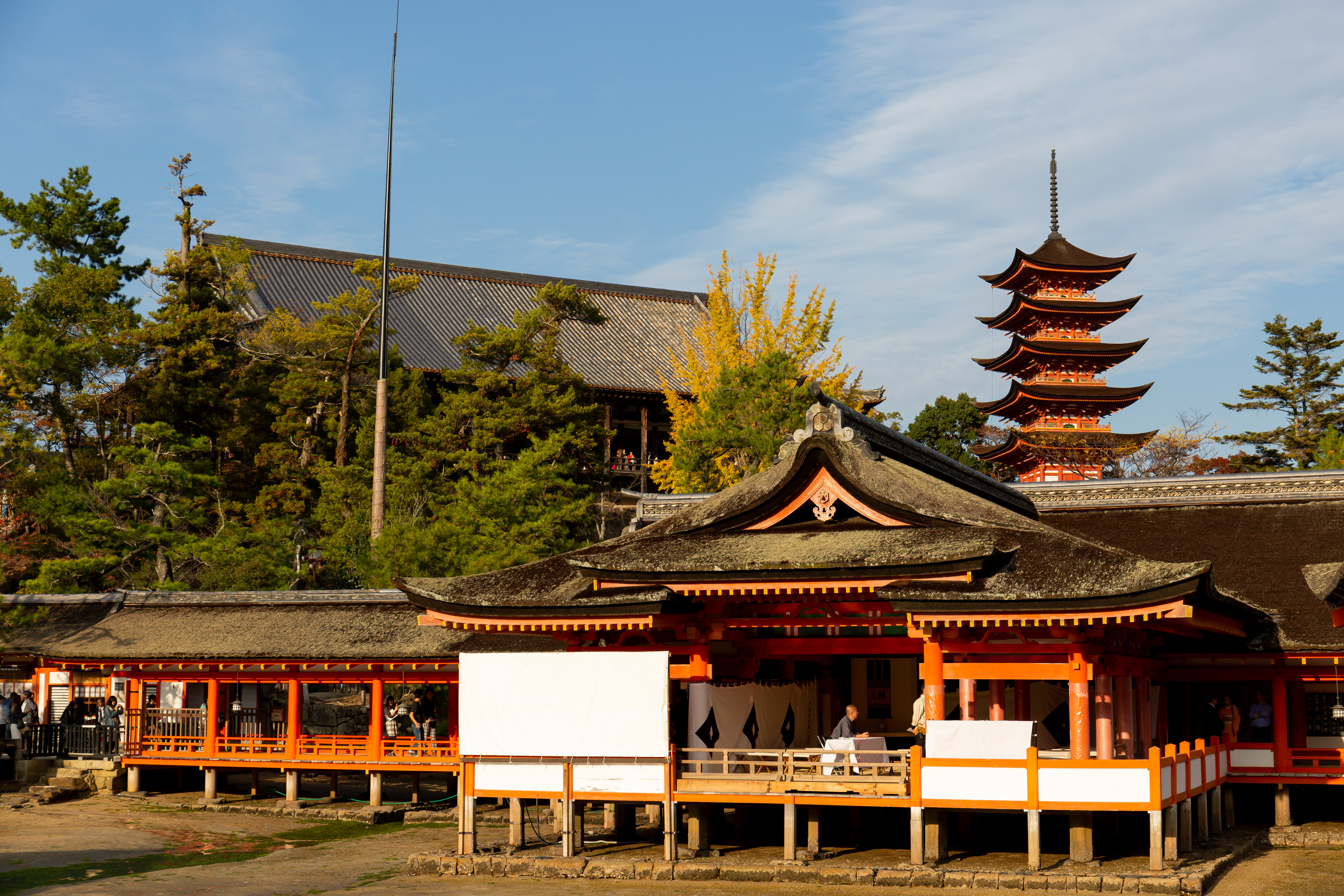
Itsukushima Shrine temple, Japan

=== Shinto ===
Kami-no-michi is almost unique to Japan and the Japanese diaspora. It is a set of practices carried out to establish a connection between present-day Japan and its ancient past. Shinto practices were first recorded and codified in the written records of the Kojiki and Nihon Shoki in the 7th and 8th centuries. Still, these earliest Japanese writings do not refer to a unified "Shinto religion", but rather to disorganized folklore, history, and mythology. Shinto today applies to the public shrines suited to various purposes such as war memorials, harvest festivals, romance, and historical monuments, as well as various sectarian organizations.

Shinto is the largest religion in Japan, practiced by nearly 80% of the population, yet only a small percentage of these identify themselves as "Shintoists" in surveys. According to surveys carried out in 2006 and 2008 show that 3% to 3.9% of the population of Japan are members of Shinto sects and derived religions.

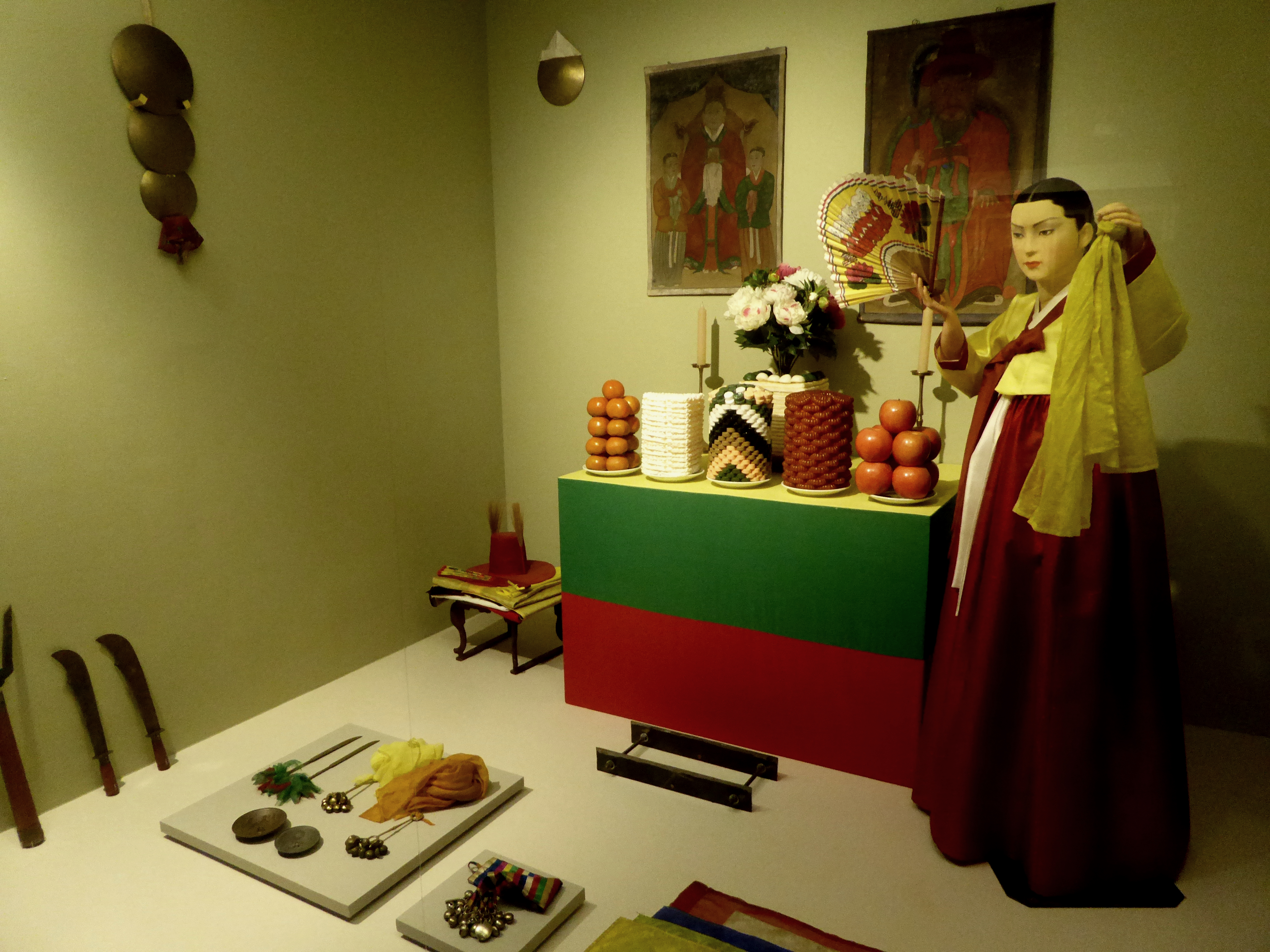
Diorama of a Shamanic Ritual in the National Museum of Korea

=== Musok ===
Korean Shamanism (Musok) ("religion of the Mu") or sometimes Sinism (Shingyo, "religion of the gods", with shin being the Korean character derivative of the Hanja), encompasses a variety of indigenous religious beliefs and practices of the Korean people, the Korean sphere and the Korean diaspora. In contemporary South Korea, the most used term is Musok (Korean: 무속; Hanja: 巫俗) and a shaman is known as a mudang (Korean: 무당; Hanja: 巫堂). The role of the mudang, usually a woman, is to act as intermediary between a spirit entity, spirits or gods and human beings.

Women are enlisted by those who want the help of the spirit world. Shamans hold gut, or services, in order to gain good fortune for clients, cure illnesses by exorcising negative or 'bad' spirits that cling to people, or propitiate local or village gods. Such services are also held to guide the spirit of a deceased person to higher realms. Today this religion is a minority, but has in recent years seen a resurgence.

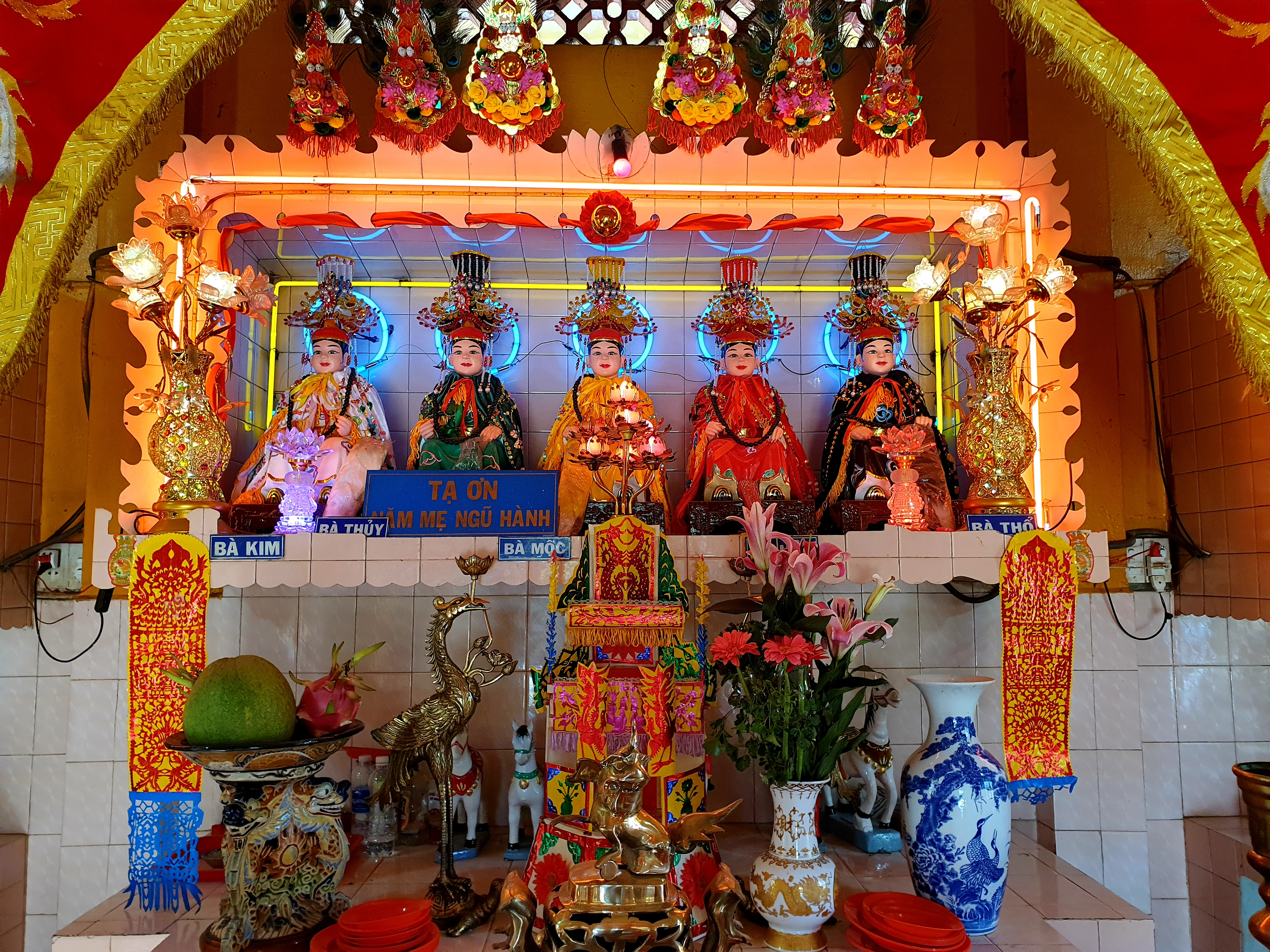
The worshiping space the group of Ngũ hành Nương nương goddess in Đình Bình Đông, Vietnam

=== Vietnamese folk religion ===
Vietnamese folk religion or Vietnamese indigenous religion (Vietnamese: tín ngưỡng dân gian Việt Nam, tôn giáo bản địa Việt Nam, sometimes just called đạo Lương, Chữ Hán: 道良), is the largest religion in Vietnam with about 45.3% of the Vietnamese population that are associated with this religion. Vietnamese folk religion is not an organized religious system, but a set of local worship traditions devoted to the thần, a term which can be translated as "spirits", "gods" or with the more exhaustive locution "generative powers". These gods can be nature deities or national, community or kinship tutelary deities or ancestral gods and the ancestral gods of a specific family. Ancestral gods are often deified heroic persons. Vietnamese mythology preserves narratives telling of the actions of many of the cosmic gods and cultural heroes.

The Vietnamese indigenous religion is sometimes identified as Confucianism since it carries values that were emphasized by Confucius. Đạo Mẫu is a distinct form of Vietnamese folk religion, giving prominence to some mother goddesses into its pantheon. The government of Vietnam also categorises Caodaism as a form of Vietnamese indigenous religion, since it brings together the worship of the thần or local spirits with Buddhism, Confucianism and Taoism, as well as elements of Catholicism, Spiritism and Theosophy.

== Iranian religions ==
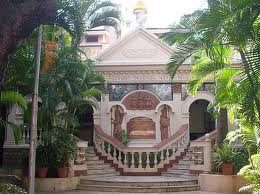
Andheri Parsi Fire Temple, INDIA

=== Zoroastrianism ===
Zoroastrianism was once the state religion of the Persian Empire, but is now a minority mostly found in India and Iran. It worships a monotheistic god, Ahura Mazda, and was founded by Zoroaster. Zoroastrianism is a religion and philosophy based on the teachings of prophet Zoroaster (also known as Zarathustra, in Avestan), probably founded some time before the 6th century BC. The term Zoroastrianism is, in general usage, essentially synonymous with Mazdaism, i.e., the worship of Ahura Mazda, exalted by Zoroaster as the supreme divine authority.

In Zoroastrianism, the Creator Ahura Mazda is all good, and no evil originates from Him. Thus, in Zoroastrianism good and evil have distinct sources, with evil (druj) trying to destroy the creation of Mazda (asha), and good trying to sustain it. Mazda is not immanent in the world, and His creation is represented by the Amesha Spentas and the host of other Yazatas, through whom the works of God are evident to humanity, and through whom worship of Mazda is ultimately directed. The most important texts of the religion are those of the Avesta, of which a significant portion has been lost, and mostly only the liturgies of which have survived. The lost portions are known of only through references and brief quotations in the later works of (primarily) the 9th-11th centuries.

The total number of currently practicing adherents of Zoroastrianism is unknown. A 2004 estimate gives a range of 124,000 to 190,000, roughly half of them in India (the Parsi and Irani groups).

The largest number of Zoroastrians in Asia can be found in India; according to the 2001 census, they amounted 69,000. In Iran, there were some 25,000 according to the 2011 census. In 2012, the numbers for Zoroastrians in Asia were; India (61,000), Iran (15,000 / 22,271), Persian Gulf Countries (1,900), and Singapore (372).

== Irreligion ==
According to a Pew Research Center survey in 2012 religiously unaffiliated (including agnostics and atheists) make up about 21.2% of Asia population. According to the same survey, the religiously unaffiliated are the majority of the population in four Asian countries/territories: North Korea (71%), Japan (57%), Hong Kong (56%), and Mainland China (52%).

Other sources say that in the People's Republic of China, 59% of the population claim to be non-religious. However, this percentage may be significantly greater (up to 80%) or smaller (down to 30%) in reality, because some Chinese define religion differently. Some Chinese define religion as practicing customs (which may be done for cultural or traditional reasons), while others define it as actually consciously believing their religion will lead to post-mortem salvation or reincarnation. A Dentsu statistic states that 46% of Vietnamese and 51% of Japanese are irreligious.

== Religious distribution ==
=== Eastern Asia ===
Country	Population	Christian		Muslim		Irreligion		Hindu		Buddhist		Folk religion		Other religion		Jewish	
Country	Population	Pop.	%	Pop.	%	Pop.	%	Pop.	%	Pop.	%	Pop.	%	Pop.	%	Pop.	%
(mainland China) China	1,341,340,000	68,408,340	5.10	24,144,120	1.80	700,179,480	52.20	100,000	0.01	244,123,880	18.20	293,753,460	21.90	9,389,380	0.70	600 - 1,000	<0.01
Hong Kong	7,053,947	1,048,150	14.30	126,900	1.80	3,955,050	56.10	35,000	0.53	930,600	13.20	902,400	12.80	105,750	1.50	0	0.00
Macau	540,560	38,880	7.20	1,080	0.20	83,160	15.40	200	0.04	93,420	17.30	318,060	58.90	5,400	1.00	0	0.00
Taiwan	23,220,670	1,277,100	5.50	10,000	0.04	2,948,940	12.70	9,000	0.01	4,945,860	21.30	10,263,240	44.20	3,761,640	16.20	0	0.00
Japan	126,540,000	2,024,640	1.60	233,080	0.16	72,127,800	57.00	160,000	0.12	45,807,480	36.20	506,160	0.40	5,947,380	4.70	0	0.00
North Korea	24,350,000	487,000	2.00	0	0.00	17,361,550	71.30	10	0.00	365,250	1.50	2,995,050	12.30	3,141,150	12.90	0	0.00
South Korea	48,180,000	14,164,920	29.40	103,773	0.20	22,355,520	46.40	50,000	0.11	11,033,220	22.90	385,440	0.80	96,360	0.20	0	0.00
Mongolia	3,296,866	42,859	1.3	105,500	3.2	1,338,528	40.6	N/A	N/A	1,704,480	51.7	82,422	2.5	23,078	0.7	N/A	N/A
Total	1,573,980,000	87,472,510	5.56	24,719,860	1.57	820,002,340	52.10	260,000	0.01	308,820,470	19.62	309,220,410	19.65	22,447,060	1.43	600 - 1,000	<0.01

=== Southeastern Asia ===
Country	Population	Christian		Muslim		Irreligion		Hindu		Buddhist		Folk religion		Other religion		Jewish	
Country	Population	Pop.	%	Pop.	%	Pop.	%	Pop.	%	Pop.	%	Pop.	%	Pop.	%	Pop.	%
Brunei	408,540	37,600	9.40	300,400	75.10	1,600	0.40	2,000	0.50	34,400	8.60	24,800	6.20	400	0.10	0	0.00
Cambodia	14,143,680	56,560	0.40	282,800	2.00	28,280	0.20	10,000	0.10	13,701,660	96.90	84,840	0.60	0	0.00	0	0.00
Indonesia	280,725,428	29,403,015	10.41	231,069,932	83.91	8,385,396	3.04	4,677,535	1.69	2,023,719	0.73	122,043	0.04	73,911	0.02	500	0.00
Laos	6,200,000	93,000	1.50	0	0.00	55,800	0.90	1,000	0.01	4,092,000	66.00	1,903,400	30.70	43,400	0.70	0	0.00
Malaysia	33,200,000	3,021,200	9.10	21,082,000	63.50	597,600	1.80	2,025,200	6.10	6,208,400	18.70	0	0.00	298,800	0.90	0	0.00
Myanmar	51,483,949	3,192,005	6.20	2,213,810	4.30	51,483	0.10	257,419	0.50	45,254,391	87.90	411,872	0.80	102,967	0.20	0	0.00
Philippines	108,667,043	92,746,021	85.34	6,981,710	6.42	1,095,000	1.00	30,634	0.02	2,173,400	2.00	259,000	0.23	5,352,805	4.92	28,473	0.02
Singapore	5,700,000	1,077,300	18.90	889,200	15.60	1,140,000	20.00	285,000	5.00	1,772,700	31.10	0	0.00	535,800	9.40	10,456	0.04
Thailand	69,120,000	622,080	0.90	3,801,600	5.50	207,360	0.30	100,120	0.20	64,419,840	93.20	60,000	0.09	0	0.00	0	0.00
Timor-Leste	1,343,875	1,338,500	99.60	2,690	0.20	0	0.00	271	0.02	0	0.00	1,120	0.08	0	0.00	0	0.00
Vietnam	94,700,000	7,765,400	8.20	175,700	0.20	28,031,200	29.60	201,200	0.21	15,530,800	16.40	42,899,100	45.30	351,400	0.40	0	0.00
Total	660,328,354	138,958,397	21.04	266,477,182	40.35	39,593,719	6.00	9,312,430	1.40	155,211,310	23.50	45,766,175	6.90	6,759,483	1.00	28,493	0.00

=== Southern Asia ===
Country	Population	Christian		Muslim		Irreligion		Hindu		Buddhist		Other religion		Jewish	
Country	Population	Pop.	%	Pop.	%	Pop.	%	Pop.	%	Pop.	%	Pop.	%	Pop.	%
Afghanistan	39,090,000	30,000	0.08	39,020,000	99.82	0	0.00	0	0.00	0	0.00	40,000	0.10	0	0.00
Bangladesh	166,290,035	500,000	0.30	151,440,000	91.07	0	0.00	13,140,000	7.90	1,010,000	0.61	200,000	0.12	35	0.00
Bhutan	767,000	0	0.00	7,000	0.91	0	0.00	170,000	22.16	580,000	75.62	10,000	1.30	0	0.00
India	1,402,626,325	31,060,000	2.21	213,060,000	15.19	50,000	0.00	1,113,200,000	79.37	9,550,000	0.68	35,700,000	2.55	6,325	0.00
Maldives	480,000	0	0.00	470,000	97.92	0	0.00	10,000	2.08	0	0	0	0	0	0
Nepal	29,778,748	510,000	1.71	512,000	1.72	1,483,000	4.98	23,680,000	79.52	2,394,000	8.04	1,199,742	4.03	6	0.00
Pakistan	235,000,017	2,990,000	1.27	226,880,000	96.54	30,000	0.01	5,030,000	2.14	20,000	0.01	50,000	0.02	17	0.00
Sri Lanka	22,566,400	1,260,000	5.58	2,300,000	10.19	20,000	0.09	3,280,000	14.53	15,700,000	69.57	6,394	0.03	6	0.00
Total	1,896,598,525	36,350,000	1.92	633,689,000	33.41	1,583,000	0.08	1,158,510,000	61.08	29,254,000	1.54	37,206,136	1.96	3,689	0.00

=== Central Asia ===
Country	Population	Christian		Muslim		Irreligion		Hindu		Buddhist		Folk religion		Other religion		Jewish	
Country	Population	Pop.	%	Pop.	%	Pop.	%	Pop.	%	Pop.	%	Pop.	%	Pop.	%	Pop.	%
Kazakhstan	16,030,460	3,975,440	24.8	11,285,120	70.4	673,260	4.2	5,000	0.01	32,060	0.2	48,090	0.3	16,030	0.1	0	0.00
Kyrgyzstan	5,333,440	607,620	11.40	4,690,400	88.0	21,320	0.40	1,000	0.01	0	0.00	5,330	0.1	0	0.00	0	0.00
Tajikistan	6,880,000	110,080	1.6	6,652,960	96.7	103,200	1.5	9,000	0.01	0	0.00	0	0.00	0	0.00	0	0.00
Turkmenistan	5,040,000	322,560	6.4	4,687,200	93.0	25,200	0.5	6,000	0.00	0	0.00	0	0.00	0	0.00	0	0.00
Uzbekistan	27,440,000	631,120	2.3	26,534,480	96.7	219,520	0.8	16,000	0.01	1,000	< 0.01	1,000	< 0.01	0	0.00	1,000	< 0.01
Total	60,720,000	5,646,820	9.30	53,850,160	88.69	1,042,500	1.72	55000	0.01	33,060	< 0.05	54,420	0.10	16,030	< 0.05	1,000	< 0.01

=== Western Asia ===
Country	Population	Christian		Muslim		Irreligion		Hindu		Buddhist		Folk religion		Other religion		Jewish	
Country	Population	Pop.	%	Pop.	%	Pop.	%	Pop.	%	Pop.	%	Pop.	%	Pop.	%	Pop.	%
Armenia	3,091,245	3,043,650	98.50	<1,000	0.10	40,170	1.30	0	0.00	0	0.00	0	0.00	3,090	0.10	0	0.00
Azerbaijan	9,191,720	275,700	3.00	8,905,110	96.90	0	0.00	0	0.00	0	0.00	0	0.00	0	0.00	0	0.00
Bahrain	1,260,000	182,700	14.50	885,780	70.30	23,940	1.90	123,480	9.80	31,500	2.50	0	0.00	2,520	0.20	7,560	0.60
Cyprus	1,100,000	805,200	73.20	278,300	25.30	13,200	1.20	0	0.00	2,200	0.20	0	0.00	0	0.00	0	0.00
Iran	92,417,681	112,100	0.12	91,955,593	99.5	110,500	0.11	0	0.00	0	0.00	0.00	0.00	149,400	0.16	<10,000	0.01
Iraq	31,670,000	253,360	0.80	31,353,300	99.00	31,670	0.10	0	0.00	0	0.00	0	0.00	20,000	0.06	0	0.00
Israel	7,420,000	148,400	2.00	1,380,120	18.60	230,020	3.10	0	0.00	22,260	0.30	14,840	0.20	7,420	0.10	5,609,520	75.60
Jordan	6,190,000	136,180	2.20	6,016,680	97.20	0	0.00	6,190	0.10	24,760	0.40	0	0.00	0	0.00	0	0.00
Kuwait	2,740,000	391,820	14.30	2,030,340	74.10	0	0.00	232,900	8.50	76,720	2.80	0	0.00	8,220	0.30	0	0.00
Lebanon	4,230,000	2,170,090	47.30	2,592,990	55.30	12,690	0.30	0	0.00	8,460	0.20	0	0.00	0	0.00	0	0.00
Oman	2,780,000	180,700	6.50	2,388,020	85.90	5,560	0.20	152,900	5.50	22,240	0.80	0	0.00	27,800	1.00	0	0.00
Palestine	4,040,000	96,960	2.40	3,943,040	97.60	0	0.00	0	0.00	0	0.00	0	0.00	0	0.00	0	0.00
Qatar	1,760,000	242,880	14.2	1,152,800	65.5	15,840	0.90	242,880	15.1	54,560	3.10	0	0.00	12,320	0.70	0	0.00
Saudi Arabia	27,450,000	1,207,800	4.40	25,528,500	93.00	192,150	0.70	301,950	1.10	82,350	0.30	82,350	0.30	82,350	0.30	0	0.00
Syria	20,410,000	2,122,640	10	18,940,480	92.80	408,200	2.00	0	0.00	0	0.00	0	0.00	0	0.00	0	0.00
Turkey	86,100,000	117,100	0.14	83,600,000	97.09	2,200,000	2.55	37,100	0.04	45,500	0.05	0	0.00	88,500	0.10	25,200	0.03
United Arab Emirates	7,510,000	946,260	14.00	5,775,190	70.00	82,610	1.10	495,660	10.00	150,200	2.00	0	0.00	60,080	0.80	0	0.00
Yemen	24,050,000	48,100	0.20	23,833,550	99.10	24,050	0.10	144,300	0.60	0	0.00	0	0.00	0	0.00	0	0.00
Total	310,787,248	12,759,354	3.87	290,758,294	92.59	4,238,495	1.16	1,562,736	0.28	514,257	0.10	172,635	0.10	712,838	0.30	5,821,928	2.02

== See also ==
- Abrahamic religions
- Agnosticism
- Atheism
- Buddhism and Eastern religions
- Eastern religion
- History of religion
- Indian religions
- List of new religious movements
- List of religions and spiritual traditions
- List of religious populations
- Major religious groups
- Monotheism
- Northeast China folk religion
- Paganism
- Polytheism
- Regional forms of shamanism
- Religions by country
  - Religion in Africa
  - Religion in Europe
  - Religion in Oceania
  - Religion in North America
  - Religion in South America
- Religion in the Mongol Empire
  - Tengrism (a Turko-Mongolic religion)
- Three Teachings (In Chinese philosophy, the Three Teachings are considered a harmonious aggregate of Confucianism, Taoism and Chinese Buddhism.)
