= Expatriates in the United Arab Emirates =

Total population
- 9.66 million (2025 est.); Approximately 89% of the UAE population

Regions with significant populations
- Dubai • Abu Dhabi • Sharjah

Languages
- English (lingua franca) • Arabic • Hindi • Malayalam • Urdu • Bengali • Pashto • Tagalog • Persian • Russian • Others

Religion
- Islam • Christianity • Hinduism • Others

Related ethnic groups
- Expatriates in Kuwait

Expatriates in the United Arab Emirates represent about 89% of the population, while Emiratis constitute roughly 11% of the total population, making the UAE home to the world's highest percentage of expatriates after the Vatican City.

Most immigrants reside in Dubai and the capital, Abu Dhabi. The UAE is home to over 200 nationalities. Indians and Pakistanis form the largest expatriate groups in the country, constituting 28% and 16% of the total population respectively. People from western countries in the United Arab Emirates make up around 5% of its total population.

== History and background ==
A number of immigrants settled in the country prior to independence. The United Arab Emirates attracts immigrants from all over the world; this may be because UAE nationals prefer to work for the government or military. The country's relatively liberal society compared to some of its neighbours has attracted many global expatriates, including people from the Western nations. Many immigrants were also attracted by its tax-free status.

However, since the late 2010s, an influx of high-net-worth individuals has significantly increased the cost of living, especially housing and private school fees. The UAE went from being the 90th most expensive destination for expatriates in 2013 to the 31st in 2023. As a result, thousands of middle-class workers left the country. Saudi Arabia is competing with Dubai to attract these expatriates. The absence of an easy route to citizenship is another cause of emigration. Lower-paid expatriates are less affected by the local inflation as they work in manual professions such as construction and cleaning where their employers pay for their rent, electricity and transportation.

=== Legal status ===
Under Article 8 of UAE Federal Law no. 17, an expatriate can apply for UAE citizenship after residing in the country for a period not less than 30 years providing that person has maintained a good reputation, has never been convicted of a crime and is fluent in Arabic.

== Nationalities ==
The UAE government does not publish demographic data regarding nationality. The table below records estimates of various reliable sources.

UAE population by nationality
Nationals of	Population	Year of data
India	4,300,000	2025
Pakistan	1,700,000	2025
UAE	1,310,000	2025
Bangladesh	1,200,000	2024
Philippines	700,000	2026
Iran	600,000	2025
Nepal	450,000	2025
Egypt	400,000	2022
China	370,000	2025
Sri Lanka	300,000	2021
Afghanistan	300,000	2025
Palestine	300,000	2023
Syria	242,000	2017
United Kingdom	240,000	2026
Jordan	200,000	2024
Ethiopia	200,000	2025
Lebanon	200,000	2025
Sudan	200,000	2023
Uganda	160,000	2024
Russia	150,000	2025
South Africa	100,000	2018
Morocco	100,000	2019
Indonesia	100,000	2019
Nigeria	100,000	2026
Iraq	100,000	2025
Yemen	99,638	2019
Saudi Arabia	85,000	2018
Somalia	80,000–100,000	2018
Turkey	60,000	2025
France	64,000	2026
Canada	60,000	2025
United States	50,000	2018
Kenya	40,000	2025
Tunisia	25,000	2025
Ukraine	30,000	2024
Algeria	30,000	2020
Australia	25,000	2025
Thailand	19,000	2025
Italy	18,671	2024
South Korea	13,000	2019
Brazil	12,000	2022
Germany	10,000	2022

== See also ==
- Demographics of the United Arab Emirates
- Foreign relations of the United Arab Emirates
