= Jordan–United Arab Emirates relations =

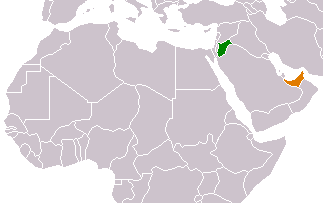

- Jordan: United Arab Emirates

The United Arab Emirates has an embassy in Amman, and Jordan maintains an embassy in Abu Dhabi and a consulate-general in Dubai. Both countries are part of the Middle East region and share close cultural ties. Most notably, Princess Haya bint Al Hussein of Dubai is of Jordanian origin.

On 4 January 2023, during a visit to the United Arab Emirates, King Abdullah II of Jordan met with UAE President Sheikh Mohamed bin Zayed Al Nahyan in Abu Dhabi. They discussed bilateral relations, regional developments and the two-state solution to the Israeli–Palestinian conflict.

== See also ==
- Jordanians in the United Arab Emirates
- Foreign relations of the United Arab Emirates
- Foreign relations of Jordan
