= Baháʼí Faith in the United Arab Emirates =

The Baháʼí Faith in the United Arab Emirates began before the country gained independence in 1971. The first Baháʼís arrived in Dubai and Sharjah by 1940, and by 1957 there were four Baháʼí Local Spiritual Assemblies in the region of the United Arab Emirates and a regional National Spiritual Assembly of the Arabian Peninsula. Looklex Encyclopedia estimated some 75,000 Baháʼís or 1.6% of the national population - second only to Iran in number of Baháʼís in the nations of the Middle East - though the Association for Religious Data Archives (relying on World Christian Encyclopedia) estimated closer to 51,700, 1.3%, in 2005. Recent estimates of the ARDA count some 38,364 Baháʼís or 0.5% of the national population.

== Development ==
Major cities of the United Arab Emirates

By 1940s Baháʼís had arrived in Sharjah and Dubai, and by 1957 there were Baháʼí Local Spiritual Assemblies in Dubai, Abu Dhabi, Ras Al Khaymah, and Sharjah, and a regional Baháʼí National Spiritual Assembly of the Arabian Peninsula. This regional national assembly was re-organized for the Southern and Eastern Arabia in 1967, and of South East Arabia in 1974.

== Modern community ==
Since its inception the religion has had involvement in socio-economic development beginning by giving greater freedom to women, promulgating the promotion of female education as a priority concern, and that involvement was given practical expression by creating schools, agricultural coops, and clinics. The religion entered a new phase of activity when a message of the Universal House of Justice dated 20 October 1983 was released. Baháʼís were urged to seek out ways, compatible with the Baháʼí teachings, in which they could become involved in the social and economic development of the communities in which they lived. Worldwide in 1979 there were 129 officially recognized Baháʼí socio-economic development projects. By 1987, the number of officially recognized development projects had increased to 1482. Many consider the Baháʼís kafir (infidels), and they lack many basic rights but they live peacefully and respectfully in the UAE.

Census figures count Baháʼís as Muslim and since many Baháʼís had passports that identify them as Muslims, the Ministry of Education required Baháʼí children to take the prescribed Islamic studies classes. However, 15 percent of the UAE are not Muslim, Christian, or Jewish. Unofficial sources noted by the U.S. Department of State assert that one-third of these are collectively Baháʼí, Parsi, or Sikh. These estimates differ from census figures because census figures do not count "temporary" visitors and workers, and Baháʼís are counted as Muslim. By some other estimates there were 55,000 Baháʼís (1.95% of the national population) as of 2000, and 75,000 Baháʼís or 1.6% circa 2008 - second only to Iran in the number of Baháʼís in the nations of the Middle East though the World Christian Encyclopedia estimated 51,700 in 2005. The ARDA estimates some 38,364 Baháʼís in 2010 or 0.5% of the national population.

Recently, Baháʼís have been generally able to practise their religion in the country; in 1999 a touring group of youth, a Baháʼí Workshop (see Oscar DeGruy), with members from many countries including the UAE had performed in India and other places. In February 2001, a group of Baháʼís travelled to the UAE from Iran to attend a Ruhi Institute Baháʼí study circle, and the Emirate of Abu Dhabi donated land for a Baháʼí cemetery (and other cemetery lands for other religions).

The UAE government recognizes the Baha’i community and has included them in key dialogues around tolerance. In addition, the government donated land to the Baha’i community in various Emirates for cemeteries and in Abu Dhabi a house of worship as part of the UAE tolerance initiative.

== See also ==
- Baháʼí Faith by country
- Religion in the United Arab Emirates
- Freedom of religion in the United Arab Emirates
- Human rights in the United Arab Emirates
