= Canadians in the United Arab Emirates =

Total population
- 45,000 (2016); 0.42% of the UAE's population

Regions with significant populations
- Dubai · Abu Dhabi

Languages
- Canadian English · Canadian French · Arabic

Related ethnic groups
- Canadians

Canadians in the United Arab Emirates are residents of the United Arab Emirates who originate from Canada. They include Emirati-born residents of Canadian origin or Canadian emigrants in the UAE.

== Demographics ==
As of 2014, there were over 40,000 Canadians living in the country. This includes around 12,000 Arab Canadians. The total population has experienced an increase since 2007, when the number of Canadians was around 12,000.

== Education ==
There are some Canadian-curriculum international schools in the UAE serving expatriate students, as well as a Canadian University of Dubai.

== Canada-UAE relations ==
Canada has an embassy in Abu Dhabi and a consulate-general in Dubai.

== See also ==
- Canada–United Arab Emirates relations
- Canadian diaspora
- Expatriates in the United Arab Emirates
