= Religion in the United Arab Emirates =

Religion in the United Arab Emirates (2020 estimate)
1. Islam (official) (74.5%)
2. Christianity (12.9%)
3. Hinduism (6.20%)
4. Buddhism (3.20%)
5. Agnosticism (1.30%)
6. Other religion (1.90%)

Per the United Arab Emirates constitution, Islam is the official religion. 75% of the population were Muslim as of 2020. 63% are Sunni, 7% are Shia and 4% follow another branch of Islam. The royals families of Al Nahyan and Al Maktoum ruling families adhere to the Maliki school of jurisprudence. As such, the Maliki school remains the UAE's dominant school of thought and is sometimes used in legal sharia rulings. The other main religions present in the country include Christianity (13%), Hinduism (6%), and Buddhism (3%). Zoroastrians, Druze, Baha'i, Judaism, and Sikhism are also practiced by some non-nationals. 1% of the population is agnostic.

== Islam ==
Sheikh Zayed Grand Mosque in Abu Dhabi. Islam is the official religion of the United Arab Emirates.

The constitution designates Islam as the official religion, with over 90% of the Emirati population are Sunni Islam, mainly following the Maliki school. The vast majority of the remainder 5–10% are Shia Muslims, who are concentrated in the Emirates of Dubai and Sharjah. Although no official statistics are available for the breakdown between Sunni and Shia Muslims among noncitizen residents, media estimates suggest less than 20 percent of the noncitizen Muslim population are Shia. The majority of the UAE's population is Muslim, with both citizens and a significant portion of the expatriate community adhering to Islam. Among UAE nationals, nearly all are Muslim, and Islam is integral to their identity.

The federal General Authority of Islamic Affairs and Endowments (Awqaf) oversee the administration of Sunni mosques, except in Dubai, where they are administered by the Dubai's Islamic Affairs and Charitable Activities Department (IACAD). The Awqaf distributes weekly guidance to Sunni imams regarding the themes and content of khutbah with a published script every week which are posted on its website. The Awqaf applied a three-tier system in which junior imams followed the Awqaf khutbah script closely; midlevel imams prepared sermons according to the topic or subject matter selected by Awqaf authorities; and senior imams had the flexibility to choose their own subject for their khutbah. Some Shia religious leaders in Shia majority mosques chose to follow Awqaf-approved weekly addresses, while others write their own khutbah. The government funds and supports Sunni mosques, with the exception of those considered private, and all Sunni imams as considered government employees.

The Jaa'fari Affairs Council manages the Shia affairs for all of the country, including overseeing mosques and endowments. The council also issues additional instructions on sermons to Shia mosques. The government does not appoint religious leaders for Shia mosques. Shia adherents worship and maintain their own mosques and the government considers Shia mosques to be private. However, Shia mosques are eligible to receive funding from the government upon request. The government allows Shia mosques to broadcast the Shia adhan from their minarets. Shia Muslims have their own council, the Jaafari Affairs Council, to manage Shia affairs, including overseeing mosques and community activities, managing financial affairs, and hiring preachers. The government permits Shia Muslims to observe Ashura in private gatherings, but not in public rallies.

For Muslims, the Sharia is the principal source of legislation. However, the judicial system allows for different types of law, depending on the case. Sharia forms the basis for judicial decisions in most family law matters for Muslims, such as marriage and divorce, and inheritance for Muslims. However, in the case of non-Muslims or noncitizens, the laws of their home country apply, rather than Sharia.

Conversion to Islam is viewed favorably, though converting from Islam to other religions is not recognized and deeply discouraged. Muslim men may marry non-Muslim women who are People of the Book, but Muslim women are not permitted to marry non‑Muslim men unless the man converts to Islam; such marriages are not legally recognized.

== Other Abrahamic religions ==
=== Christianity ===
St. Philip the Apostle Russian Orthodox Church in Sharjah

Christians are the largest non-Muslim religious groups in the UAE. Estimates suggest that there are over 1 million Christians in the country, though exact figures vary. Catholics and Protestants form a large proportion of the Christian minority. According to the 2005 census, Christians accounted for 9% of the total population; estimates in 2010 suggested a figure of 12.6%. The country has over 52 churches in 2023. Because Islam considers Christians to be People of the Book, the government has been more willing to consider land grants for churches, resulting in Christian religious buildings outnumbering those of other non-Muslim religions in 2008. Many Christians in the United Arab Emirates are of Asian, African, and European descent, along with fellow Middle Eastern countries Lebanon, Syria, and other countries. In April 2020, a Latter-day Saint temple was announced in Dubai.

The schools in public ownership have no Christian religious education.

=== Judaism ===
As of 2019, according to Rabbi Marc Schneier of the Foundation for Ethnic Understanding, there are about 150 Jewish families (3,000 Jews) living in the UAE who are free to practice their religion. The synagogue in Dubai, which opened in 2008, is supported by the UAE, with the appointment of a Minister for Tolerance in 2016. The Ministry of Tolerance led to the creation of the National Tolerance Programme and official recognition of the Jewish community in the UAE.

As of June 2020 community is headed by the president of the Dubai Jewish Community, Solly Wolf, and Rabbi Levi Duchman. The community has Talmud Torah, Kosher Chicken Shechita and a permanent synagogue located in Dubai.

IMPACT-se launched a report in January 2022 about religious tolerance in the United Arab Emirates. Though the organization denied finding any hateful content in the textbooks, which "generally met" UNESCO peace and tolerance guidelines, it did cite the missing education about the Jewish state and its history. The textbooks in question reportedly taught about the 2020 Abraham Accords leading to the normalization of relations between the UAE and Israel, but skipped Israel in maps or education on the event of Holocaust. Since 2022, Judaism is experiencing a revival in the Emirates.

On 16 February 2023, the Moses Ben Maimon Synagogue was built in Abu Dhabi as part of the Abrahamic Family House, alongside the Imam Al-Tayeb Mosque and St. Francis Church.

== Dharmic religions ==
In 1958, Sheikh Rashid bin Saeed al Makhtoum gifted land to allow a temple to be built. A temple was built that was shared by Sikhs and Hindus.

=== Hinduism ===
Hindus are the second-largest non Muslim religious group in the UAE, primarily because of immigration from India, a hindu majority nation. A temple with over 16 deities was inaugurated in the 'Worship Village' in Jebel Ali on 1 September 2022. Previously, worshipers could attend the Dubai Hindu Temple in Dubai locally referred to as the Shiva and Krishna Mandir. This temple closed down in January 2024. A traditional temple, BAPS Hindu Mandir, opened on 14 February 2024 dedicated to Swaminarayan and various other Hindu deities.

=== Buddhism ===
Approximately 2% of the population, or nearly 500,000 people adhere to Buddhism. The Mahamevnawa Buddhist Monastery in Jumeirah, Dubai is the UAE's only Buddhist temple. In addition, there are smaller Buddhist centers and organizations that serve the Buddhist community. Buddhists in the UAE consist largely of expatriate workers from countries in Asia with large Buddhist populations, such as Thailand, Nepal, and Sri Lanka.

=== Jainism ===
As of 2015, there were approximately 10,000 Jains in Dubai. A Jain temple, with the deities of Vimalnath Bhagwan and Parshwanath Bhagwan is located in Bur Dubai. The Jain community in the UAE mainly consists of expatriates from India, particularly from states like Gujarat, Rajasthan, and Maharashtra, where Jainism has a strong presence.

=== Sikhism ===
In December 2011, Guru Nanak Darbar Gurudwara was inaugurated in Jebel Ali. On 17 January 2012 the gurudwara was open to over 50,000 devotees residing in the UAE. Sikh population is relatively small compared to other religious groups, it is a well-organized and active community.

== Irreligion ==
=== Atheism ===
Up to 4% of people reported irreligious beliefs according to a Gallup poll conducted in 2022. It is illegal for Muslims, with apostates from Islam facing a maximum sentence of the death penalty under the country's anti-blasphemy law. As such, there have been questions regarding freedom of religion in the United Arab Emirates.

Atheism in the region is mainly present among foreign expatriates and a very small number of local youth. According to Sultan Sooud Al-Qassemi, due to Islam being founded in the Arabian Peninsula over 1,400 years ago, the Persian Gulf region enjoys a long Islamic history and tradition, and it is strongly associated with national identity; thus, any distancing or criticism of religion "equates to distancing oneself from national identity". Al-Qassemi notes that the use of social media via the internet remains the strongest medium of expression for Gulf atheists, while providing anonymity; a pioneering Gulf blogger is the Emirati atheist Ahmed Ben Kerishan, who is known in the Arabic blogosphere for advocating atheist and secular views.

== Freedom of religion ==
In 2023, according to Freedom House, where 0 is the least freedom and 4 is the highest degree of freedom, the UAE was scored 2 out of 4 for religious freedom.

== See also ==
- Freedom of religion in the United Arab Emirates
- Bahá'í Faith in the United Arab Emirates
- Shia Islam in the United Arab Emirates
