= Hindu Temple, Dubai =

Dubai Hindu Temple
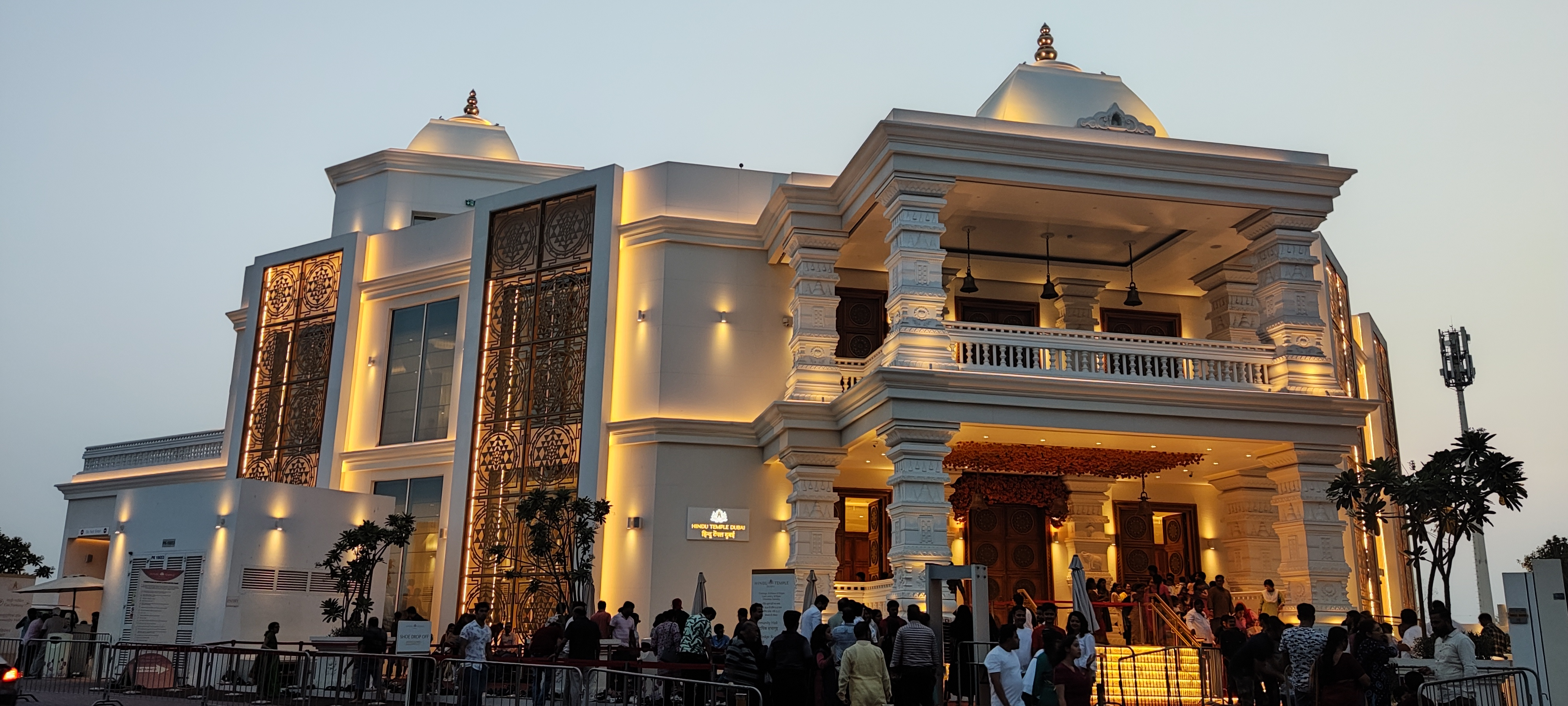
- Hindu Temple, Dubai, United Arab Emirates

- Location within Dubai Hindu Temple, Dubai (United Arab Emirates) Hindu Temple, Dubai (Persian Gulf) Hindu Temple, Dubai (Asia)

Religion
- Affiliation: Hinduism
- Deity: Shiva (main), Ganesh, Krishna, Vishnu, Rama, Durga, Murugan, Hanuman, Ayyappan

Location
- Location: Jebel Ali
- State: Dubai
- Country: United Arab Emirates
- Coordinates: 25.264705°N 55.296759°E

Architecture
- Completed: 2022

The Dubai Hindu Temple is a place of worship for Hindus in Jebel Ali, Dubai, United Arab Emirates (UAE). The temple caters to the large Hindu community in the UAE. The temple complex, initially established in 1958 in Bur Dubai, comprised the Shiva Mandir, Krishna Mandir, and Gurudwara.

In October 2022, the Shiva Mandir and Gurudwara were relocated to a new Hindu Temple at a site in Jebel Ali. Krishna Mandir continues to stay at the Bur Dubai location.

== History ==
In 1958, Sheikh Rashid bin Saeed al Maktoum permitted a Hindu temple to be built on the first floor on top of a warren of old-fashioned shops in Bur Dubai. This shopping center is known as the "Bur Dubai Old Souk" and is located west of the Dubai Creek in the area known as Bur Dubai. This original temple complex housed the Shiva Mandir, Krishna Mandir, and Gurudwara. This temple had a prayer hall with two altars or shrines ("Sannidhis") on two sides, one for Shiva and one for Krishna. And a third altar for Gurudwara. Underneath the temple hall, there are small old-fashioned shops. This is the shopping center, and there's no particular identifiable gateway. There are walls built to make the structure sound proof as per government laws to noise control because of structures position in small crowded market.

The Hindu Temple, Dubai opened on 5 October 2022 (coinciding with the Diwali festival) in Jebel Ali, which includes the Shiva Mandir and Gurudwara. Constructed at a cost of approximately 60 million dirhams, the new Hindu Temple exhibits a fusion of Indian and Arabic architectural styles. The temple was built using 900 tonnes of steel, 6,000 cubic meters of concrete, and 1,500 square meters of marble. The temple has 16 deities including Ganesh, Ayyappan, Guruvayoorappan, Vishnu and Lakshmi, Rama, Krishna, Jhulelal, Shiva with lingam (the main deity), Mookambika, Venkateshwara, Durga, Murugan, Gautamswami, Jalaram Bapa, Sai Baba and Hanuman deities along with the Guru Granth Sahib. The temple's structure includes hard carved pillars and lattice screens with Sri Yantra carvings. The structure also includes nine brass spires (kalashas) ornamenting the outer domes.

On 3 January 2024, the Shiva Mandir and Gurudwara closed at Bur Dubai complex and relocated all services at the new Hindu Temple, Dubai in Jebel Ali. The Krishna Mandir is still located at the temple complex in Bur Dubai.

The Navagraha (9 planetary deities) shrine was initially located on the terrace, but has now been relocated to a separate shrine in the backyard of the temple.

== Features ==
The Hindu Temple, Dubai has a ground floor which features a knowledge room, a community hall (where festivals are celebrated) and a hand-washing area. The knowledge room stores copies of the 4 Vedas and are kept next to idols of Goddess Saraswati and Sage Vyasa. The Saraswati idol is sometimes brought to the main prayer shrine for festivals like Vasant Panchami and the 9th day of Navratri. The first floor main prayer hall is decorated with a pink lotus sculpture and an open terrace with a Tulasi plant. Fire sacrifices (yajnas) are often performed in the terrace. The main prayer hall has 108 brass bells. It features a facade partially shaded with a blend of Arabic mashrabiya architecture and traditional Hindu Sri Yantra designs. White and black marble statues of Hindu deities, crafted in Jaipur, Kanyakumari, and Madurai, are installed in the temple.

== See also ==
- Hinduism in the United Arab Emirates
- Sikhism in the United Arab Emirates
