= Indonesians in the United Arab Emirates =

Total population
- c. 100,000

Regions with significant populations
- Abu Dhabi · Dubai

Languages
- Indonesian · English · Other Indonesian languages

Religion
- Islam · Christianity

Related ethnic groups
- Indonesian diaspora

Indonesians in the United Arab Emirates are Indonesian citizens who live and work in the United Arab Emirates. They are mostly concentrated in the Abu Dhabi and Dubai. As of 2012, their estimated population was 100,000.

== See also ==
- Indonesia–United Arab Emirates relations
- Indonesian diaspora
- Expatriates in the United Arab Emirates
