= Demographics of Dubai =

The population of Dubai, the most populous city in the United Arab Emirates, is estimated to be 3.655 million as of December 2023 according to government data. As of 2021, 3.2 million were non-Emirati, and 69% were male. About 58.50% of the population is concentrated in the 25-44 age group. This unnatural age and gender distribution is due to the large proportion of foreign workers, most of whom are working-age males. Life expectancy at birth was 81 years for males, and 82.1 for females.

== Languages spoken ==
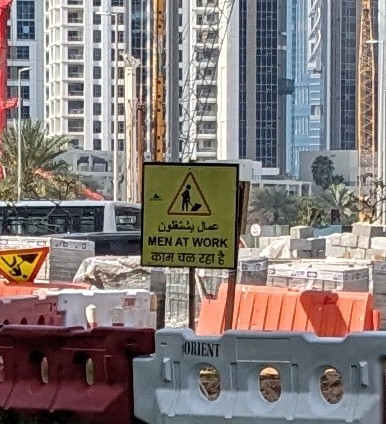
Trilingual signage in Arabic, English and Hindi shows the variety of different languages spoken.

Dubai's official language is Arabic, but English is the lingua franca and is far more commonly used than any other language in the daily communications between the city's residents. Languages such as Hindi–Urdu, Malayalam and Filipino are common among migrant worker communities.

== Religion ==
Article 7 of the UAE's Provisional Constitution declares Islam the official state religion of the Union. The Government funds or subsidizes almost 95 percent of Sunni mosques and employs all Sunni imams; approximately 5 percent of Sunni mosques are entirely private, and several large mosques have large private endowments. Shias are 15% of the UAE's native population. The Shi'a minority is free to worship and maintain its own mosques. Shi'a Muslims in Dubai may pursue Shi'a family law cases through a special Shi'a council rather than the Shari'a courts.

Dubai has large expatriate communities of Hindus, Christians, Buddhists, Sikhs and others. Non-Muslim groups can own their own houses of worship, wherein they can practice their religion freely, by requesting a land grant and permission to build a compound. Groups that do not have their own buildings must use the facilities of other religious organizations or worship in private homes. While the UAE does not offer any federal-level method of granting official status to religious groups, the individual emirates may exercise autonomy in officially recognizing a particular religious denomination. For instance, Dubai granted legal status to the Church of Jesus Christ of Latter-day Saints in 1993.
