= Freedom of religion in the United Arab Emirates =

Freedom of religion in the United Arab Emirates is curtailed. Freedom of worship is allowed, so long as it does not conflict with public policy or morals, subject to designation by the UAE state. The government tightly controls the building of houses of worship for any other religion than Islam. The UAE set up a Ministry of Tolerance to project an image of religious tolerance to the outside world, but critics say it is intended to present the government's version of Islam as moderate and other versions as extremist.

The Constitution of the United Arab Emirates provides for freedom of religion by established customs, but in practice proselytizing by non-Muslims is not allowed, blasphemy is not allowed, and religious groups (in particular, Muslims) are subject to considerable monitoring. The federal Constitution declares that Islam is the official religion of the country.

In 2023, Freedom House scored the country 2 out of 4 for religious freedom.

== Religious demography ==
The 2022 population of the UAE stands at 9.4 million, Only approximately 20% of residents are UAE citizens. According to the CIA World Factbook, 76% of the residents are Muslim, 9% are Christian, other (primarily Hindu and Buddhist, less than 5% of the population consists of Parsi, Baha'i, Druze, Sikh, Ahmadi, Ismaili, Dawoodi Bohra Muslim, and Jewish) 15%. It is one of the most liberal countries found in Middle East. Foreigners are predominantly from South and Southeast Asia, although there are substantial numbers from the Middle East, Europe, Central Asia, the Commonwealth of Independent States, North America and South America.

According to a US report, the 2005 census found that 76 percent of the population were Muslim, 9 percent were Christian, and 15 percent from other noncitizen religious groups, mainly Hindus and Buddhists, but including Zoroastrians, Baha’is, Druze, Sikhs, and Jews; estimates in 2010 suggested that 76.9 percent of the total population was Muslim, 12.6 percent Christian, 6.6 percent Hindu, and 2 percent Buddhist.

== Religious discrimination ==
In recent years, a large number of Shia Muslim expatriates have been deported from the UAE. In particular, Lebanese Shia families have been deported for their alleged sympathy for extremist group Hezbollah. According to some organizations, more than 4,000 Shia expats have been deported from the UAE in recent years.

Chinese Uyghurs who relocated to the UAE after facing human rights abuse at the hands of the Beijing government were subjected to detention, torture, and deportation from Abu Dhabi. According to testimony shared by the wife of one of the detainees, China requested three major Arab countries, which included the UAE, for the deportation of Uyghur migrants. The decision received major backlash and UAE authorities failed to respond when asked to comment on the deportation of Chinese Uyghurs despite not sharing an extradition agreement with China.

== Apostasy ==
Apostasy is a crime in the United Arab Emirates. In 1978, the UAE began the process of Islamising the nation's law, after its council of ministers voted to appoint a High Committee to identify all its laws that conflicted with Sharia. Among the many changes that followed, UAE incorporated hudud crimes of Sharia into its Penal Code - apostasy being one of them. Article 1 and Article 66 of the UAE's Penal Code required hudud crimes to be punished with the death penalty, even though no executions for apostasy have ever taken place. By virtue of Federal Decree Law No. (15) of 2020, Articles 1 and 66 of UAE's Penal Code no longer incorporate hudud crimes.

== Houses of Worship Law ==
The UAE enacted Federal Law 9 of 2023 on Regulating Houses of Worship for Non-Muslims, known as the Houses of Worship Law, which establishes a national framework governing the licensing, financing, operation, and oversight of non-Islamic houses of worship across the country. The Law provides that religious activities are to be conducted within officially licensed premises and sets out the requirements for establishing a house of worship. These include having at least 20 founding members who are long-term residents of good standing, supported by their religious leadership, as well as demonstrating the financial capacity to establish and operate the house of worship, among other criteria.

== See also ==
- Human rights in the United Arab Emirates
- Religion in the United Arab Emirates
