= Australians in the United Arab Emirates =

Total population
- 16,000 (2015); 0.17% of the UAE population

Regions with significant populations
- Abu Dhabi · Dubai · Sharjah

Languages
- English (Australian English) · Arabic

Religion
- Christianity

Australians in the United Arab Emirates consist of 16,000 expatriates, most of whom live in Dubai and the capital of Abu Dhabi.

== Migration history ==
Australians are attracted by the lifestyle Dubai offers, including the wealth of outdoor activities for their families. However, their population fell in 2009 due to the downturn in the economy of Dubai, as retrenched Australian expatriates with underwater real-estate loans fled the country to avoid debtor's prison.

== Organisations ==
In Dubai, Australian and New Zealander expatriates joined to set up the Australia New Zealand Association, which aims to provide mutual support for their communities in the entire UAE.

The Australian International School, Sharjah is an established international school, catering to much of the Australian community. The school's education system and syllabus is Queensland-curriculum based.

== See also ==
- Australia–United Arab Emirates relations
- Unity Resources Group
