= Blasphemy law in the United Arab Emirates =

The United Arab Emirates (UAE) law against blasphemy is governed by article 312 of the United Arab Emirates Penal Code.

== Law ==
According to Article 312 of the Penal code, the following offences if perpetrated publicly shall be a subject to a jail sentence for a minimum period of one year in addition to a fine:

- Offence to any of the Islamic sacred beliefs or rites.
- Insult to any of the divine recognized religions.
- Approving, encouraging or promoting sin or do any act that tempts towards committing it.
- Knowingly eating pork meat by Muslims

== Selected cases ==
In 2008, three Filipino workers were accused in the Emirate of Sharjah allegedly for ripping a page out of the Quran and scribbling on the page. The allegation arose during a dispute between the workers and their employer.

In 2012, a French businessman was accused for defacing the Quran by spitting on it before he assaulted and threatened to kill a new British Muslim convert after she refused to marry him.

In August 2021, Abdul Khader Puthiyangadi, an ex-Muslim from Kerala, was arrested without bail and sentenced to prison for three years for criticizing Quran and Hadith in the United Arab Emirates on the grounds of the blasphemy law.

== See also ==
- Blasphemy law
- Human rights in the United Arab Emirates
- Islam and blasphemy
