= South Africans in the United Arab Emirates =

Total population
- ~100,000 (2014)

Regions with significant populations
- Abu Dhabi; Dubai

Religion
- Christianity, Islam and Hinduism

There is a large population of South Africans in the United Arab Emirates. While the UAE National Bureau of Statistics does not publish any demographic data in relation to nationality, estimates reveal the number of South African immigrants in the country to be about 100,000 as of 2014. Time Out magazine estimated that 50,000 South Africans resided in Dubai alone as of 2009. The influx of South Africans has been so large as to lead South African newspaper Independent Online to unofficially dub the United Arab Emirates "South Africa's 10th province".

== Demographic characteristics ==
Half of the South Africans in the UAE hold higher educational qualifications, and only 15% work in entry-level positions. They are motivated to emigrate from South Africa to escape the country's high crime levels and gain international experience. Additional attractions include the high quality of health care, low cost of cars compared to South Africa, and attractive salaries; conversely, South African employees are attractive to UAE firms because they are accustomed to lower salaries than their European peers. Some also describe "reverse discrimination" as a motivation for their departure from South Africa. They tend to be white, male, under 35, and English- rather than Afrikaans-speaking. Roughly 15% intend to remain in the UAE for 10 years or longer. However, most do not to see the UAE as a long-term home, and stay in the country for shorter times than other expatriates in traditional emigration destinations such as London. Nevertheless, there are worries that South African migration to the UAE could become a permanent "brain drain" for the country.

== Organisations ==
Scholars International Academy has offered courses in Afrikaans to South African children in Dubai since 2007. There is also an Afrikaans-speaking church, and a South African Women's Association.

== See also ==
- South Africa–United Arab Emirates relations
