= Jordanians in the United Arab Emirates =

Total population
- 250,000

Regions with significant populations
- Dubai · Abu Dhabi

Languages
- Arabic (Jordanian · Gulf · Palestinian)

Religion
- Islam, Christianity

There are thousands of Jordanians living in the United Arab Emirates. As of 2009, their population was estimated at 250,000, an increase from 80,000 in 2003, making them one of the largest Jordanian diaspora communities both worldwide and in the Persian Gulf region and also form the second-largest community of non-citizen Arabs in the UAE after the Egyptians. Most Jordanians live in Dubai and the capital, Abu Dhabi.

== Economic status ==
Jordanian labour is in high value and demand throughout the country. Many Jordanians are highly qualified and occupy jobs which require skilled training. Most work in white-collar jobs as professors, managers, bankers, doctors, and engineers. The UAE has previously initiated a number of developments and construction projects in Jordan, many of which have been designed to allow Jordanians living in Dubai to invest in their home country. In 2010, Emirates Post collaborated with Jordan Post to activate an efficient money transfer service which would enable people living in the UAE to send money to Jordan in 'less than 24 hours.' The agreement was thought to be beneficial for hundreds of Jordanian expatriates living in the UAE who could now send money back home on a low transfer fee.

== Notable people ==
Emirati people of Jordanian origin include:

- Princess Haya bint Al Hussein of Dubai
- Al Jalila bint Mohammed bin Rashid Al Maktoum, daughter of Sheikh Mohammed bin Rashid Al Maktoum and Princess Haya of Dubai

== See also ==
- Jordanian American
- Jordan – United Arab Emirates relations
