= Hinduism in the United Arab Emirates =

Hindus in the United Arab Emirates
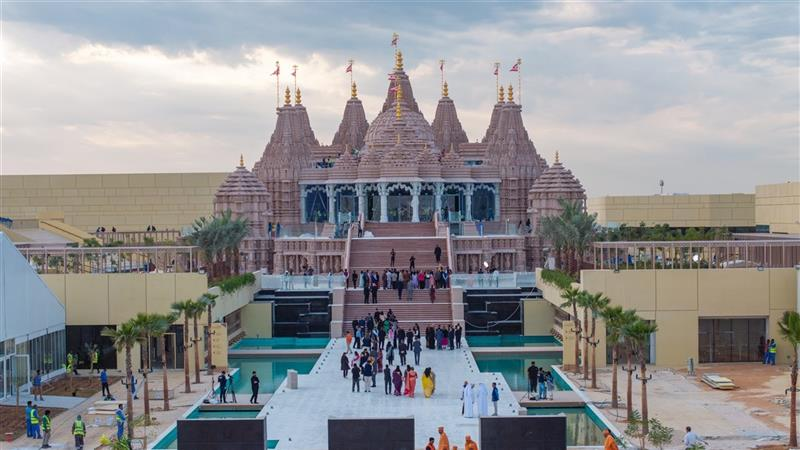
- Visitors at newly constructed BAPS Hindu Mandir at Abu Dhabi.

Total population
- 1,240,000 (2022)▲; 15% of total population

Regions with significant populations
- Abu Dhabi, Dubai, and Sharjah

Religions
- Hinduism

Related ethnic groups
- Indians in the United Arab Emirates

Hinduism is the third largest religion in the United Arab Emirates and Hindus constitute around 6.6%-15% of the population in the nation. Hinduism is followed mainly by the significant Nepali and Indian population in the United Arab Emirates.

== History ==
At the turn of the 20th century, the region that now comprises the UAE experienced an economic boom as a result of the pearling industry; the few Indian traders who immigrated to the emirates settled in coastal towns and remained on the fringes of Emirati society. Dubai has traditionally served as an "entrepôt for trade between the Middle East and the Indian subcontinent and was dominated by Hindu merchants in both gold and textile trade". After the discovery of crude oil and large-scale industrialization and urbanization in the UAE, many workers and employees came to UAE for employment purposes in the nation. Many South Asians immigrated there for work, and after 2000, Dubai became a global hotspot, attracting mainly South Asians, many of whom were Hindus.

== Demographics ==
Most of the Hindu diaspora in UAE are Indian, especially from Gujarat, Tamil Nadu, Karnataka, Uttar Pradesh, Kerala, Maharashtra, and Punjab. The other Hindus are from Nepal, Pakistan, Bangladesh, Sri Lanka, and Bhutan.

According to the 2007 International Religious Freedom Report, unofficial figures estimate that at least 15 percent of the UAE population is Hindu. In 2011, the Pew Research Center estimates that Hindus constitute 6.6% of the population.

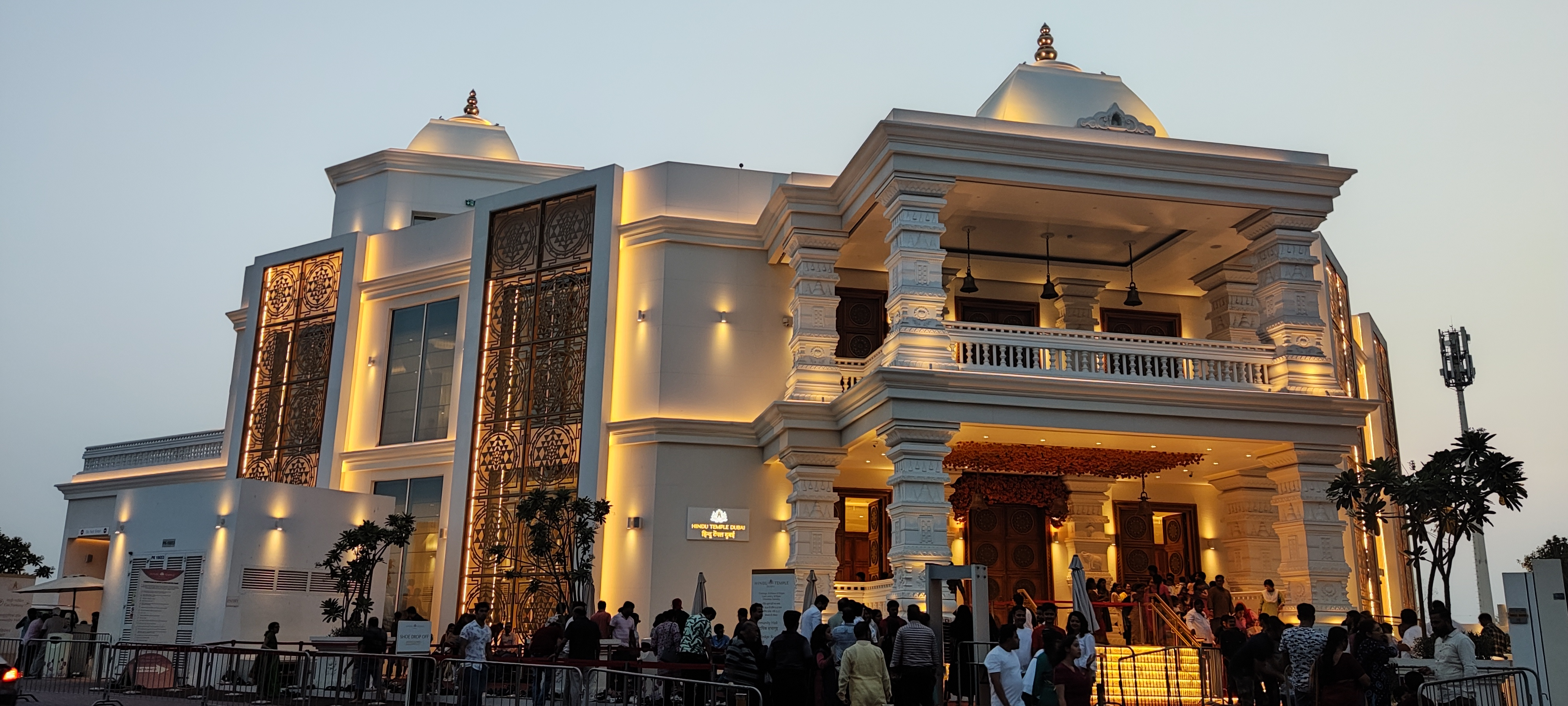
Hindu Temple, Jebel Ali, Dubai

== Temples ==
The first Hindu Temple in Dubai is located in Bur Dubai, and is locally referred to as "Shiva and Krishna Mandir." It was built in 1958. The Shiv temple closed in 2024 due to lack of space and was relocated to Jebel Ali. The Krishna Temple continues to exist there.

The second temple, Hindu Temple, Dubai, is in Jebel Ali Village next to the Sikh Gurudwara and Churches Complex. The temple was opened on October 5, 2022.

In August 2015, the UAE government allocated land for the construction of a Hindu temple in Abu Dhabi. The construction of the BAPS Hindu Mandir in Abu Dhabi commenced in December 2019. Indian Prime Minister Narendra Modi inaugurated the temple on 14 February 2024.

In addition to temples, there are community centers where Hindus can gather for prayer, religious ceremonies, and cultural activities.

== Cremation facilities for Hindus ==
There are two operating cremation facilities for the Hindu community, one in Abu Dhabi and one in Dubai.

== See also ==
- Religion in the United Arab Emirates
- Hinduism in Bahrain
