= Indians in the United Arab Emirates =

Ethnic group

Indians in the United Arab Emirates الهنود في دولة الإمارات العربية المتحدة
Total population
- 4,360,000

Regions with significant populations
- Abu Dhabi • Dubai • Sharjah

Languages
- (lingua franca) Arabic • (mother tongue) Assamese • Bengali • Bhojpuri • Dogri • Gujarati • Hindi • Kannada • Kashmiri • Maithili • Malayalam • Marathi • Nepali • Odia • Punjabi • Rajasthani • Sindhi • Tamil • Telugu • Tulu • Urdu • Other Indian languages

Religion
- Hinduism • Islam • Christianity • Sikhism • Jainism • Zoroastrianism • Buddhism • Baháʼí

Indians in the United Arab Emirates constitute the largest part of the population of the country. Over 4.3 million Indian expats are estimated to be living in the United Arab Emirates, with over 35% of the country's total population and the second highest number of overseas Indians in the world after the United States, ahead of Saudi Arabia and Malaysia. Indian contact with the emirates that now constitute the UAE dates back several centuries, as a result of trade and commerce between the emirates and India. The UAE has experienced a tremendous increase in the population of resident Indians who initially migrated to the country as a result of opportunities in petroleum. Now, Indians are key to the UAE's construction, retail, financial services, healthcare, manufacturing and transport sectors. A sizeable minority of Indian migrants are involved in professional services and entrepreneurship. Relations between India and the UAE have traditionally been very friendly.

== History ==
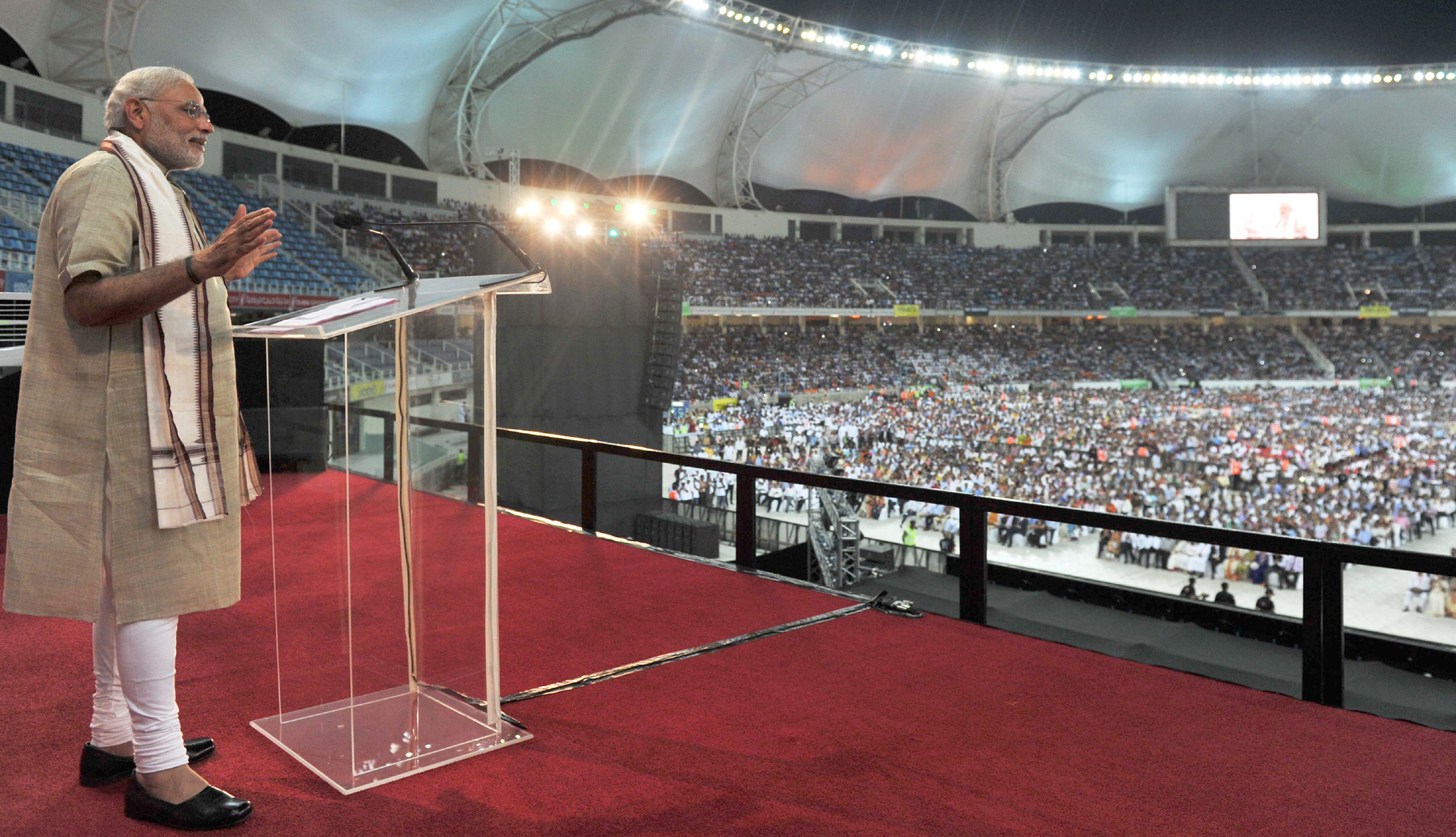
Indian Prime Minister Narendra Modi addressing an Indian community gathering in Dubai Cricket Stadium in August 2015.

Countries in the Persian Gulf region have had a long-established economic and political link with India. The Trucial Oman (now the UAE) was nominally independent in the 19th century but was administered by the British Raj; trade and banking sectors in the territory were administered by the Khoja and Kutchi communities of India. In 1853, the rulers of the emirates signed a Perpetual Maritime Truce with the British, effectively bringing the region under Britain's sphere of influence. Administered from British India, the emirates developed commonalities with South Asia. Indian Rupees were used as currency, as were Indian stamps (overlaid with the name of the emirate) for postal correspondence. A fairly homogeneous society at the turn of the 20th century, the region that now comprises the UAE experienced an economic boom as a result of the pearling industry; the few Indian traders emigrating to the emirates moved to the coastal towns and remained on the fringes of Emirati society. Dubai had traditionally served as an entrepôt for trade between the Middle East and the Indian subcontinent and was dominated by Indian merchants in gold and textile trades. Dubai was also an important trading post for Indians prior to the discovery of oil (in commercial quantities) in the UAE in 1959; the emirate had been at the centre of a smuggling route of gold via small boats to India, where the importation of gold was illegal.

=== Indian footprint on UAE economy ===
Businesses in the largest sheikhdoms in the UAE, Dubai and Abu Dhabi continued to use the Indian Rupee even after India's independence in 1947. But its popularity strained India's foreign reserves, and so in 1959 the Indian government created the Gulf rupee, initially at par with the Indian rupee. It was introduced as a replacement for the Indian rupee for circulation exclusively outside the country, which included apart from the states making up the UAE, the nations of Kuwait, Qatar, Oman and Bahrain.

On 6 June 1966, India devalued the Gulf rupee against the Indian rupee. Following the devaluation, several of the states still using the Gulf rupee adopted their own currencies.

=== Immigration boom ===
The discovery of oil brought with it an influx of workers from India from the mid-1960s onward. Many came via sea, a trip of about three days from Bombay (now Mumbai) to Dubai. Most of the shopkeepers were from the state of Kerala, or were Indian Arabs, descendants of Arabs who had previously emigrated to India. Indian migration to the UAE drastically increased in the 1970s and 1980s, with the expansion of the oil industry and the growth of free trade in Dubai. Annual migration of Indians to the UAE, which stood at 4,600 in 1975, rose to over 125,000 by 1985, and stood at nearly 200,000 in 1999.

== Demographics ==
Of the 3.4 million migrants, 1 million are from Kerala and 450,000 from Tamil Nadu, form the majority in Indian community living in UAE. By 1999, the population of Indian migrants in the UAE, which stood at 170,000 in 1975, was at 750,000. The estimated population of Indians in the UAE as of 2009 is near 2 million. Indians constitute 42% of the total UAE population. A vast majority of Indian migrants are on employment based visas, while others are on business or trade visas. Some are also sponsored by their spouse or parents.

In addition, over 300,000 undocumented migrants, many of whom are Indian, are said to be living in the UAE. Undocumented migrants, if caught, are jailed and then deported to their home countries. A federal law enacted in 1996 in the U.A.E imposed sanctions against undocumented migrants and their employers. The UAE government offers amnesty programs where foreign undocumented workers can voluntarily leave the country without facing imprisonment or having to pay fines. One such three month amnesty program in 2007 benefited 110,000 illegal Indian migrants, all of whom were either legally reabsorbed into the UAE workforce or were allowed to return to India without sanctions or imprisonment.

There is also a sizable population of second or third generation U.A.E-born Indians. They share characteristics with other third culture kids, forming a cultural identity that blends their heritage culture and the myriad of foreign cultures they encounter growing up in the U.A.E, and a more fluid sense of home. Those who grow up in western compounds tend to be well-assimilated into western culture, whereas those who stay in Indian neighborhoods tend to be more in touch with India. Many U.A.E-born Indians further migrate to countries such as the United States, Canada, Australia and New Zealand both for greater economic and lifestyle opportunities, and due to the U.A.E's restrictive citizenship practices; many are forced to leave when no longer deemed valuable by the government, and citizenship is only given to descendants of local Emiratis.

However, in 2020, the COVID-19 pandemic plunged many economies, including the UAE, into a recession. As of September 2020, more than 600,000 Indians applied to be repatriated amid the coronavirus outbreak, of which 400,000 left the country since repatriation flights began in May.

Among Indian migrants in the UAE, the majority of whom originate from the South Indian state of Kerala. Muslims constitute the largest religious group at approximately 50%, with Christians and Hindus each comprising around 25%.

== Economic contribution ==
Foreigners comprise 99% of the UAE's labour force, of which Indians are a part. Some of these foreigners have lived in the country for generations. Around 60% of Indians in the UAE are white collar professionals. In addition to employment-based migrants from India, many Indian entrepreneurs in the UAE have established successful national franchises, the notable ones such as Lulu Group International, Landmark Group, Jashanmal, Ajmal Perfumes, Amber Packaging Industries, Jumbo Electronics, Choithram's, Varkey Group, Alukkas and New Medical Centre.

The Dubai-based Indian billionaires include Micky Jagtiani of the Landmark Group, M. A. Yusuff Ali of LuLu Group International, Ravi Pillai of the RP Group, the Chhabria family of the Jumbo Group, Sunny Varkey of GEMS Education, Prateek Suri of Maser Group,Tony Jashanmal of the Jashanmal Group and Joy Alukkas of Joyalukkas Jewellery.

Rizwan Sajan of Danube Group, Azad Moopen of Aster DM Healthcare, Ramesh S Ramakrishnan of the Transworld Group, and Shamsheer Vayalil of VPS Health Care are also on the list of Indian millionaires living in Dubai.

The Gulf Medical University founded by Thumbay Moideen is an Indian contribution to the Higher Education scenario in the UAE. Today students from over 68 countries study in their campus in Ajman and the university is well known in the medical education circles.

Adnan Chilwan, Group CEO of Dubai Islamic Bank, and Kamal Puri, Founder President of Skyline University, an influencer in the UAE Education Ecosystem, Satish Sanpal, chairman and managing director of Anax Holding (Anax Media, Anax Developments, Anax Hospitality), are also some of the few well known Indians in the UAE.

By 1996, at least 150 Indian companies were operating in the Jebel Ali Free Zone Area (JAFZA), and even today, more than 50% of the work force are Indian, in one of the most successful and model Free Trade Zones of the world. Over 25% of Indian workers in the UAE were engaged in manufacturing, transport and related professions, while 20% were engaged in professional and technical fields. The 2005 Merrill Lynch report estimated that there were approximately 33,000 Indian millionaires living in the UAE. Indian expats typically save most of their earnings through employment benefits on accommodation and transport, and income tax free provisions of the UAE. As a result, a majority of the money is remitted for the maintenance of migrants' households in India. In 2005, an estimated US billion was remitted, about half of which was sent through informal hawala channels. About 70% of all remittances from the UAE (or US billion) was sent to India.

A small number of Indian migrants have been involved in criminal activities in the Middle East, including smuggling, trade in narcotics, extortions and other activities. Dubai, in particular has been associated with the smuggling of gold and precious metals. Dawood Ibrahim, head of the organised crime syndicate D-Company, is estimated to have smuggled 20 to 30 tonnes of gold to India.

== Indo-Emirati relations ==
India and the UAE (United Arab Emirates) have generally enjoyed cordial relations, partly due to their shared history with the British presence in Asia, and partly due to the pre-colonial history of trade, commerce and settlement between the nations. In 1999, the UAE government secured the release of 25 civilian passengers aboard Indian Airlines flight IC-814 that had been hijacked and forced to land in Dubai en route to New Delhi from Kathmandu, Nepal. However, several incidents, mainly concerning India's expatriate workforce in the UAE, have caused friction in Indo-Emirati relations. There is also a Historic Book launched in Dubai titled PEARLS OF DUBAI - INDO ARAB RELATIONS dated 1900–1958, which talks about the contributions of the early Indian business community settlers and their contributions towards development of Dubai. The book was formally launched by HH Shaikh Ahmed bin Saeed Al Maktoum (Chairman & CEO The Emirates Group and President Dubai Civil Aviation) and written by Deepak Vijay Bhatia (managing director of Uncle's Shop) also one of the oldest Indian family living in Dubai for over 100 Years.

== Culture ==
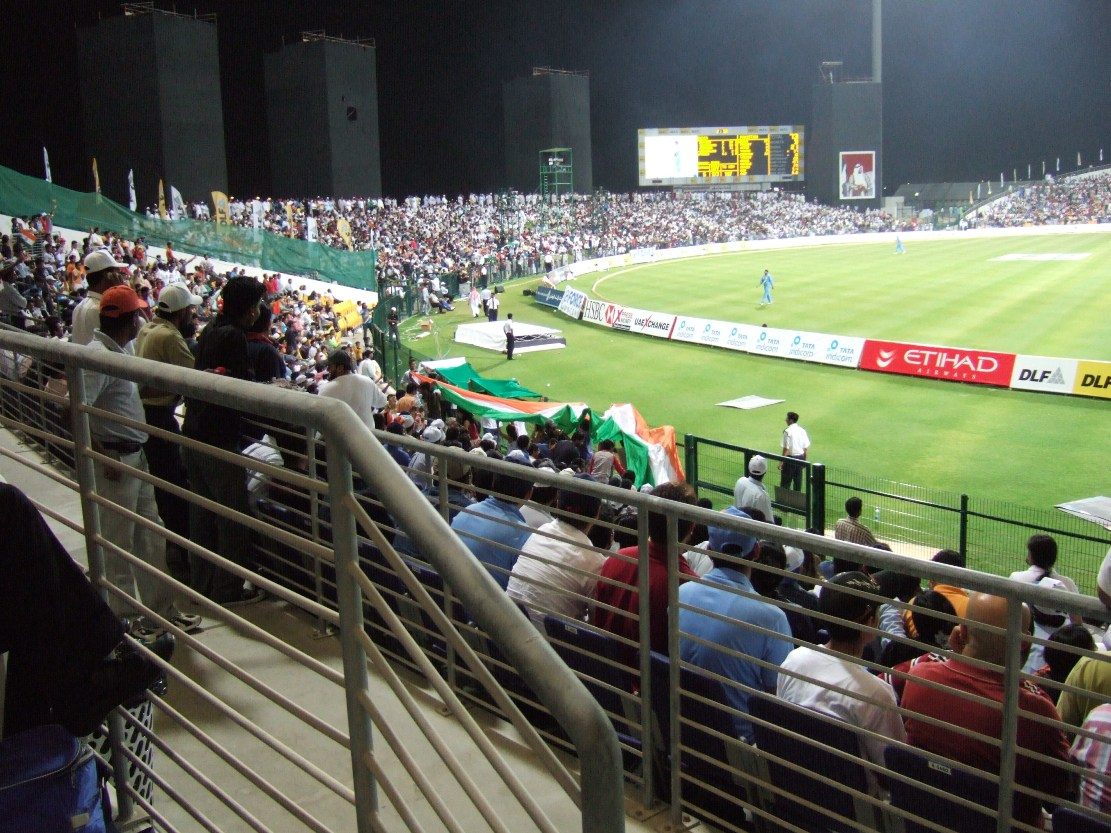
India vs Pakistan cricket charity match at the Sheikh Zayed Cricket Stadium in Abu Dhabi in 2007.

The large segment of Indian migrants, along with comparatively lenient laws in the UAE have allowed Indian communities to more or less practice their native cultures in the country. Middle class Indians in the UAE have established a network of cultural associations which cater to their needs. Cultural associations such as the India Club, Indian Association, Goan Cultural Society and numerous Keralite associations support cultural networks of the Indian sub-communities in the UAE. Additionally, schools such as the Abu Dhabi Indian School and The Indian High School, Dubai provide Indian curricular education to expatriate students. Dubai is the only emirate in the UAE with a Hindu temple and Sikh Gurudwara. In August 2015, in the backdrop of Prime Minister Narendra Modi's visit of the country, the UAE government decided to allot land for the construction of a temple in Abu Dhabi. Dubai and Sharjah are the only emirates with operating cremation facilities in the Emirates. Official permission must be obtained for their use in every instance. Churches exist in Abu Dhabi, Dubai, Sharjah, Ajman, and Ras Al-Khaimah. In 1998, the government of Dubai donated land for the construction of a facility to be shared by five congregations, four Protestant and one Catholic.

Restaurants serving Indian food are very popular and widely available in the Emirates. Many of the hotels in Dubai and Abu Dhabi have Indian restaurants that serve Mughlai or Tandoor cuisine, while vegetarian South Indian are available and popular in the larger cities of the UAE.

India-Pakistan cricket matches are widely followed by the Indian diaspora in the UAE. The Sharjah Cricket Association Stadium, established by Abdul Rahman Bukhatir, hosted several India & Pakistan matches and triangular tournaments through the 1980s and 1990s, which attracted Indian and Pakistani cricket spectators from the UAE as well as from India and Pakistan. More recently, the state-of-the-art Sheikh Zayed Cricket Stadium in Abu Dhabi has hosted bilateral and triangular cricket tournaments featuring India and Pakistan. 2014 also marked the official entry of the Indian Premier League (IPL) into UAE with matches held in Abu Dhabi, Dubai & Sharjah.

Bollywood, Tollywood (Telugu),Kannada cinema, Malayalam cinema and Kollywood are popular among Indian expatriates and are shown in most major theatres in the Emirates' main cities. Award ceremonies such as the International Indian Film Academy Awards, South Indian International Movie Awards, Asianet Film Awards, Filmfare Awards South as well as Filmfare Awards have previously been held in Dubai; the city is also a popular destination for filming Indian films.

== See also ==
- India–United Arab Emirates relations
- Bangladeshis in the United Arab Emirates
- Pakistanis in the United Arab Emirates
- Sri Lankans in the United Arab Emirates
