= Lulu Mall =

Lulu Mall may refer to:

- Lulu Mall, Kochi, located in Kochi, Kerala, India
- Lulu Mall, Thiruvananthapuram, located in Thiruvananthapuram, Kerala, India
- Lulu Mall, Palakkad, located in Palakkad, Kerala, India
- Lulu Mall, Kozhikode, located in Kozhikode, Kerala, India
- Lulu Mall, Lucknow, located in Lucknow, Uttar Pradesh, India
- Lulu Mall, Hyderabad, located in Hyderabad, Telangana, India

== See also ==
- LuLu Group International
