= Al-Wahda =

Wahda, Wehda (وحدة) or Al-Wahda also Al-Wehda or Al-Wihdeh (الوحدة "the unity") may refer to:

- Unity (state), a state of South Sudan
- Al Wahda (newspaper), an Emirati daily
- Sports clubs:
  - Al Wahda FC, a football club based in Abu Dhabi, United Arab Emirates
  - Al-Wahda SC (Oman), a football club based in Sur, Oman
  - Al-Wahda SC (Syria), a football and basketball club based in Damascus, Syria
    - Al Wahda (men's basketball), basketball club in Syria
  - Al-Wahda SC (Tripoli), a football club based in Tripoli, Libya
  - Al Wehda FC, a football club based in Mecca, Saudi Arabia
  - Al-Wehda SCC (Sanaa), a football club based in Sana'a, Yemen
  - Al-Wehda SC (Aden), a football club based in Aden, Yemen
  - Al-Wehdat SC, a football club based in Amman, Jordan
  - Al-Wihdeh SC, a football club based in Madaba Camp, Jordan
- Dams:
  - Al Wahda Dam (Morocco), on Ouergha River
  - Al-Wehda Dam on the border between Jordan and Syria, on Yarmouk river
- Al Wahda Mall in Abu Dhabi, UAE
- Al Wahda Arches in Qatar
- Wehda Street in Gaza City
