= Indian Islamic Centre, Abu Dhabi =

Cultural and religious center in Abu Dhabi, UAE

Indian Islamic Center - Abu Dhabi
- المقر الهندي الإسلامي - أبو ظبي ہندوستانی اسلامی مرکز- ابو ظہبی ഇന്ത്യന്‍ ഇസ്‌ലാമിക് സെന്‍റര്‍ - അബൂദാബി भारतीय इस्लामी केंद्र - अबू धाबी
- Location within United Arab Emirates

Religion
- Affiliation: Islam
- Branch/tradition: Sunni Muslim
- Status: Soci-cultural and Religious Centre; Affiliated to Ministry of Social Affairs - Abu Dhabi, United Arab Emirates

Location
- Location: Al Falah St, Abu Dhabi
- Country: United Arab Emirates
- Interactive map of Indian Islamic Center - Abu Dhabi
- Territory: Abu Dhabi
- Administration: Managing Committee
- Coordinates: 24.485512°N 54.380645°E

Architecture
- Established: 1971
- Construction cost: Dh 12 million
- Capacity: Main Auditorium: 1,200 Two mini Audit.:100 Class Rooms

Website
- www.iicabudhabi.org

The Indian Islamic Center, Abu Dhabi (In Arabic: المقر الهندي الإسلامي - أبو ظبي) is a socio-cultural and religious centre for the Indian community that resides in Abu Dhabi.

The centre is chaired by its chief patron the business tycoon M. A. Yusuff Ali. President Abdu Rauf Ahsani, and General secretary Adv Muhammed Kunhi are some of the committee members who manage the centre.

The centre registered with the Ministry of Social Affairs. It hosts more than nine hundred active members.

== History ==
The Islamic Centre was established in 1971 by social and philanthropic activists from Kerala who regularly assembled at Chithari Compound, a bachelor accommodation.

The center's new building was inaugurated by President of India Pratibha Patil on 23 November 2010 during her official visit.

In 2014, the centre celebrated its 40th anniversary with activities in UAE and India.

Bava Haji is the centre's longest-serving president. He played a key role in opening Al Noor Indian Islamic School under the Islamic Centre for the poor and economically backward. The school closed in 2014.
