= Abu Dhabi Indian School Branch 1, Al Wathba =

Private School in Abu Dhabi, United Arab Emirates

- مدرسة أبو ظبي الهندية - فرع الوثبة

Location
- Al Sahl St, Al Wathba South; Abu Dhabi, Emirate of Abu Dhabi; United Arab Emirates; 24.26375°N 54.658556°E

Information
- Other name: ADIS-1, Indian School
- Established: 2014; 12 years ago
- Chairman: M. A. Yusuff Ali
- Principal: Alpana Sawhney
- Gender: Mixed (Kindergarten to 4); Segregated (5 to 12)
- Age range: 5–18
- Enrollment: 3,450+
- Houses: Summer; Winter; Autumn; Spring
- Colours: Navy Blue and Off-White
- Website: https://adiswathba.com/

Abu Dhabi Indian School Branch 1, Al Wathba (Arabic: مدرسة أبو ظبي الهندية - فرع الوثبة), commonly abbreviated as "ADIS-1", is a private school offering Indian curriculum education in Abu Dhabi, United Arab Emirates. The school is managed by a Board of Governors. The school is established for the Indian community in Abu Dhabi, with the oversight of the Ambassador of India to the United Arab Emirates as Chief Patron. The school is affiliated to the Central Board of Secondary Education, New Delhi, India and is recognized and licensed by the Ministry of Education, Abu Dhabi.

== History ==
Abu Dhabi Indian School Branch 1, Al Wathba was established in 2014 to aid the sister school, Abu Dhabi Indian School which was formed in 1975. There was a growing demand for a larger facility with the capacity to handle the large influx of expatriate students in the Emirate of Abu Dhabi.

== Notable alumni ==
- Kaziah Liz Mejo, Miss Universe India 2026
- Ethan D'Souza, UAE cricketer
