= VPS Healthcare =

Multinational healthcare group

- Type: Private Limited
- Traded as: VPS Healthcare
- Industry: Conglomerate
- Founder: Shamsheer Vayalil
- Headquarters: Abu Dhabi, United Arab Emirates
- Area served: India, Middle East, Europe
- Services: Health Care Services
- Number of employees: 13000+
- Website: vpshealth.com

VPS Healthcare is an Emirati multinational healthcare group headquartered at Abu Dhabi, United Arab Emirates. The group was founded in 2007 by Indian-born businessman Shamsheer Vayalil. The healthcare group now runs 23 hospitals, and about 125 medical centres spread across the Middle East, Europe, and India.

== Hospitals ==
Medeor Hospital, Dubai

VPS Healthcare was founded and established in 2007 in Abu Dhabi, the United Arab Emirates by Shamsheer Vayalil, a doctor-turned-entrepreneur. The first hospital to be opened by the group was LLH Hospital in Abu Dhabi, UAE, in 2007. As of 2019, VPS Healthcare owns 22 hospitals which are operational in UAE, Oman and India:

- LLH Hospital – Abu Dhabi (2007)
- LLH Hospital – Mussaffa (2008)
- Lifeline Hospital, Sohar, Oman (2011)
- Life Care Hospital, Baniyas, Abu Dhabi (2012)
- Burjeel Hospital, Abu Dhabi (2012)
- Burjeel Hospital for Advanced Surgery, Dubai (2013)
- Life Care Hospital, Musaffah, Abu Dhabi (2014)
- Tajmeel Kids Park Medical Centre, Abu Dhabi (2014)
- Medeor Hospital, Abu Dhabi (2015)
- Medeor Hospital, Dubai (2015)
- Burjeel Hospital, Muscat, Oman (2016)
- Medeor Hospitals, Delhi NCR, India (2016)
- Medeor International Hospital, Al Ain, UAE (2016)
- OccuMed Clinic, Abu Dhabi (2016)
- Tajmeel Specialised Medical Centre, Abu Dhabi (2016)
- Educare Institute of Dental Sciences, Kerala, India (2016)
- Burjeel Day Surgery Centre, Abu Dhabi (2017)
- Burjeel Royal Hospital, Al Ain, UAE (2018)
- Burjeel Specialty Hospital, Sharjah (2019)
- Burjeel Medical City (Abu Dhabi) 2020
- Burjeel Retail Pharmacies (Abu Dhabi)
