= Abu Dhabi Indian School =

Private School in Abu Dhabi, United Arab Emirates

- مدرسة أبو ظبي الهندية

Location
- 23rd Street, Salama Bint Butti St; Abu Dhabi, Emirate of Abu Dhabi; United Arab Emirates; 24.445026°N 54.410699°E

Information
- Other name: ADIS, Indian School
- Established: 1975; 51 years ago
- Chairman: M. A. Yusuff Ali
- Principal: Rishikesh Padegaonkar
- Gender: Mixed (Kindergarten to 2); Segregated (3 to 12)
- Age range: 5–18
- Enrollment: 4800+
- Houses: Summer; Winter; Autumn; Spring
- Colours: White and Grey
- Alumni: Adisians
- Website: http://www.adisuae.com/

Abu Dhabi Indian School (Arabic: مدرسة أبو ظبي الهندية), most commonly abbreviated as "ADIS", is a private school offering Indian curriculum education in the city of Abu Dhabi, United Arab Emirates. A Board of Governors manages the school. The school was established for the Indian community in Abu Dhabi, with the oversight of the Ambassador of India to the United Arab Emirates as Chief Patron. The school is affiliated to the Central Board of Secondary Education, New Delhi, India and is recognized and licensed by the Ministry of Education, Abu Dhabi.

== History ==
Abu Dhabi Indian School was initially based at the old Indian Social Center (ISC) premises in the year 1975. It was established to provide educational facilities for the Indian community in the UAE. The school had its own campus by 1980, with the help of the Late UAE President, Sheikh Zayed bin Sultan Al Nahyan, who donated a plot of land in the Shabia Muroor Area to the Indian community.

== Al Wathba branch ==
On 14 September 2014, in the Al Wathba region in the outskirts of Abu Dhabi city, the first external branch of the school opened up with the official name of Abu Dhabi Indian School-Branch 1, Al Wathba (ADIS-1), with an independent administrative system. In 2019, the size of the new school was 3300 students with 240 teachers.

Since 2020, Abu Dhabi Indian School's Al Wathba branch has expanded its technology-focused education, introducing initiatives in STEM and artificial intelligence alongside a dedicated robotics laboratory. The school also received renewed CBSE senior-secondary affiliation for the period from 2025 to 2030.

== Notable alumni ==
- Benny Dayal, Indian singer
- Vishakha Singh, Indian Actress
- Jonathan Figy, UAE cricketer
- Sidin Vadukut, Author
- Adnan Chilwan, CEO of Dubai Islamic Bank
- Nirmal Sahadev, Indian filmmaker, screenwriter and actor, best known for directing Ranam (2018)
