= Lulu Mall, Hyderabad =

Shopping mall in Telangana, India

Coordinates: 17.489973°N 78.393021°E

LuLu Mall Hyderabad
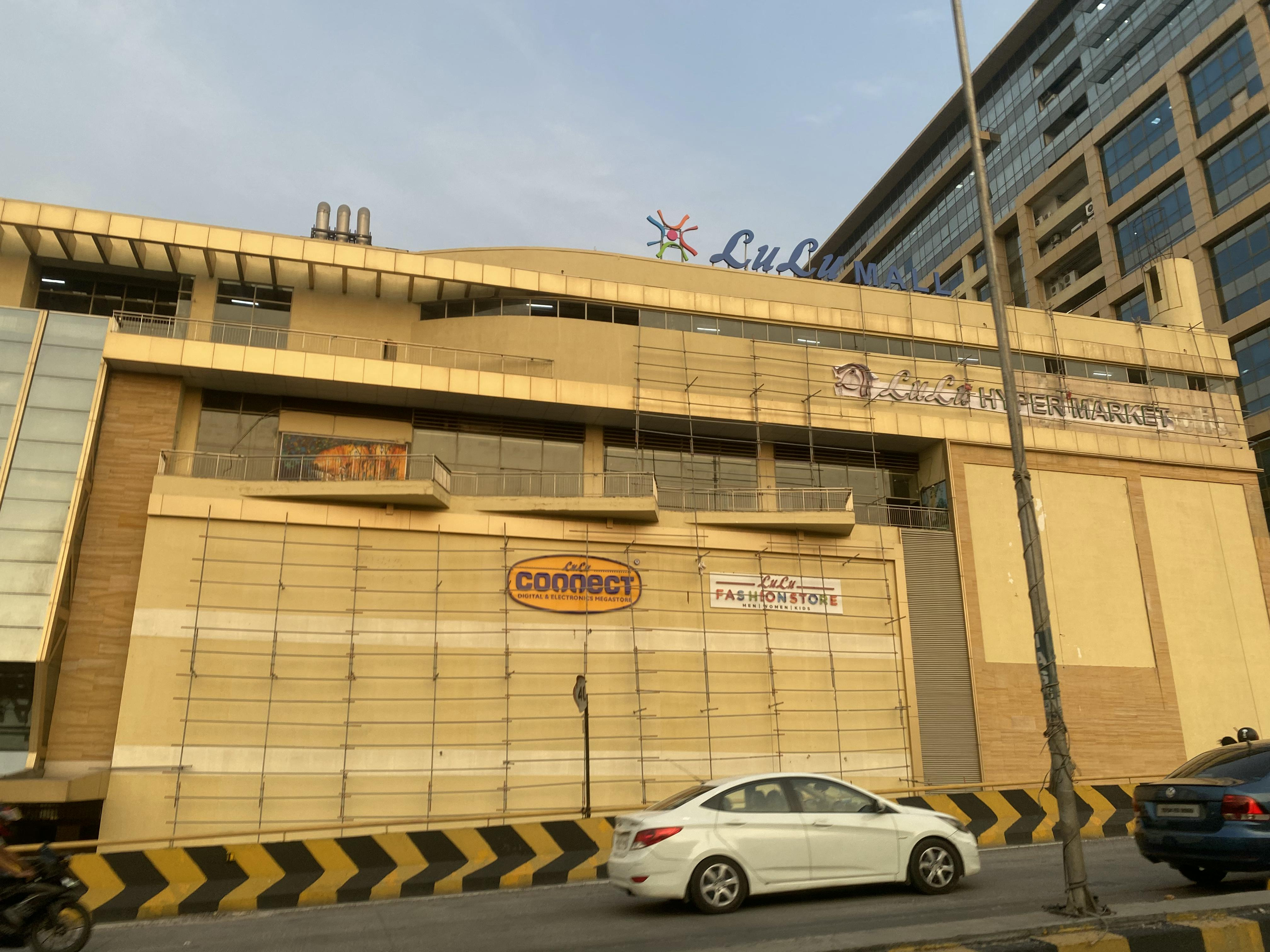
- LuLu Mall in Hyderabad
- Opened: 27 September 2023
- Owner: LuLu Group International
- Website: https://www.hyderabad.lulumall.in/

Lulu Mall Hyderabad is a shopping mall located in Hyderabad, the capital city of Telangana, India. It is the first lulu mall in the state of Telangana, located in Kukatpally. The mall was inaugurated in September 2023 and houses shops for both domestic and international brands as well as a multi-cuisine food court, a theatre, and other amenities. The estimated cost for this project was more than ₹300 crore. The property is owned and managed by Abu Dhabi based LuLu Group International.

== History ==
The LuLu International Shopping Mall, Hyderabad (commonly LuLu Mall Hyderabad) is the first LuLu Group mall in Telangana, opened on 27 September 2023 at Kukatpally Housing Board Colony. Its inauguration by Telangana Municipal Administration Minister K. T. Rama Rao and LuLu Group Chairman M. A. Yusuff Ali marked the culmination of a ₹300 crore investment and a two‑year redevelopment of the former Manjeera Mall site into a destination retail and entertainment hub. The project was part of a broader ₹3,500 crore commitment by LuLu Group to develop retail, food‑processing, and export‑oriented facilities in Telangana, following a memorandum of understanding signed during the World Economic Forum in Davos.

== Architecture ==
The LuLu Mall Hyderabad is spread over 500,000 sq ft of retail space. It comprises six floors of shopping and four basement levels of parking. The steel‑and‑glass facade was redesigned by a European consultant to improve natural lighting and energy efficiency, while the open‑plan atrium rises through all six retail levels, flooded with daylight via a 20 m × 10 m skylight. A 200,000 sq ft LuLu Hypermarket anchors the ground level, with 2 lakh sq ft dedicated to grocery and fresh‑produce sections engineered for optimized cold‑chain logistics and hygienic workflows. Entertainment facilities include a 1,400‑seat Cinepolis multiplex, a 20,000 sq ft Funtura rides zone, and a 15‑outlet multi‑cuisine food court with a combined seating capacity of over 500. The mall's mechanical services central HVAC plants, 12 high‑speed elevators, and 8 escalators are housed in a discrete service core, ensuring streamlined circulation and minimal visual clutter.

== See also ==
- LuLu Group International
