= Lulu Mall, Lucknow =

LuLu Mall Lucknow
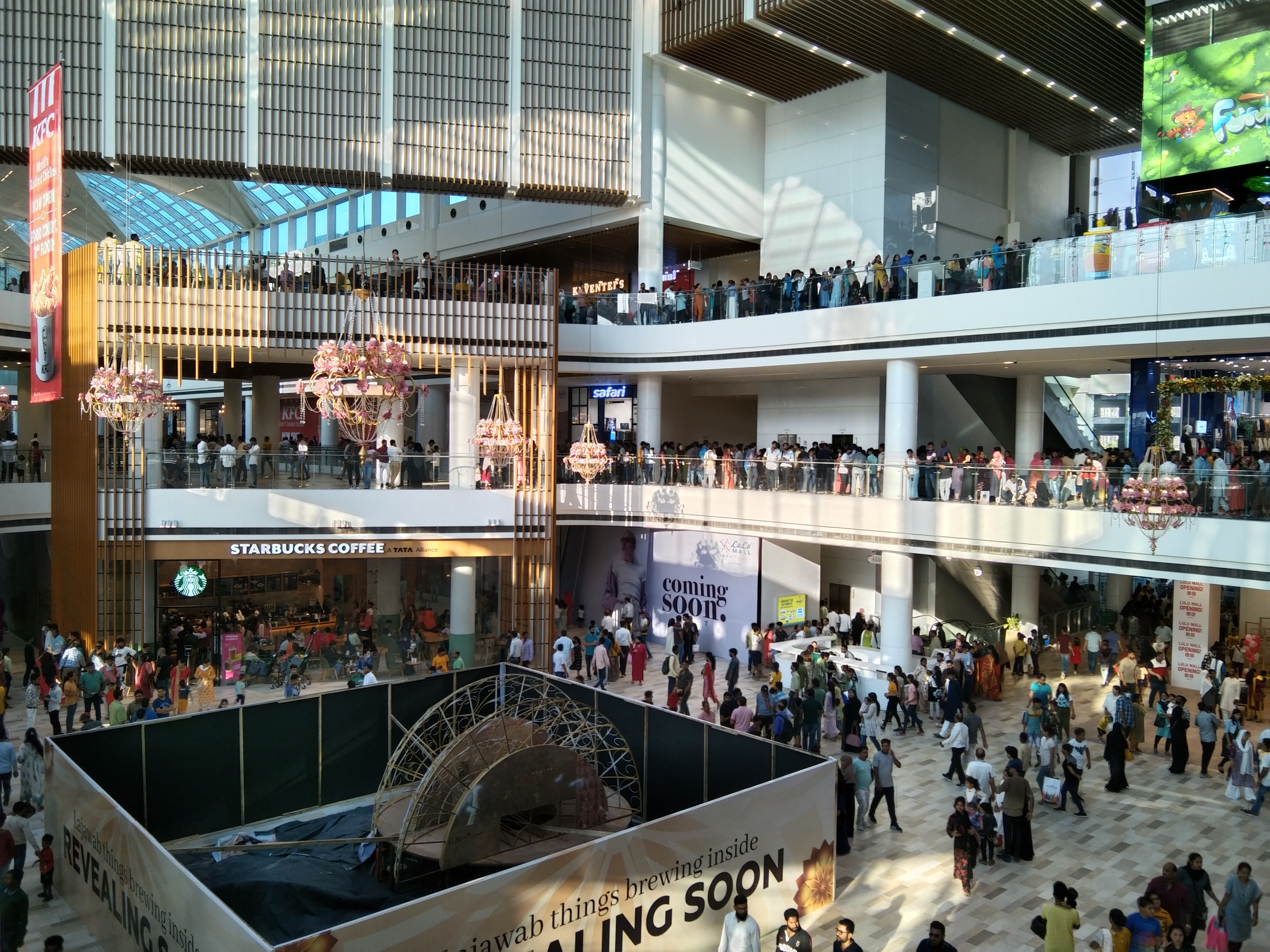
- Location: Lucknow, Uttar Pradesh, India
- Address: Amar Shaheed Path, Golf City, Sector B Ansal API, Lucknow - 226 030
- Opened: 11 July 2022; 4 years ago
- Owner: LuLu Group International
- Website: Official website

LuLu Mall, Lucknow is a shopping mall located in Lucknow, Uttar Pradesh. Spanning 45.9 acres (18.6 ha), it is one of the largest malls in India with a total built up area of 19 lakh square feet. It contains nearly 300 national and international brands and will feature a 6000 sq. m. The Mall is located within Sushant Golf City with a total development of 1,85,800 sq. m. The mixed-use development of Sushant Golf City has luxury housing, educational institutes, clubs, hospitals and a magnificent 18 hole golf course spread across 6.8 lakh sq.m. The mall was opened on 11 July 2022, by then Chief Minister of Uttar Pradesh, Shri Yogi Adityanath.

It is designed by UK-based architects, set a benchmark in the design and architecture industry with its modern art theme. The mall had a unique blend of local stories and innovative design, with a smart space layout and infrastructure that made it superior to many others. Its extraverted architectural projection integrated with the street and introduced the concept of a 'High Street' with 'Piazzas,' inspired by traditional architecture. The skylight's pointed arch geometry allowed natural light into the interior while providing protection and reducing energy demand.

With an average daily footfall of more than 80,000, it is one of the most visited places in Uttar Pradesh. As many as 1 lakh people visited the newly inaugurated LuLu Mall on its first day of operations. LuLu Group’s flagship Lulu Hypermarket and indoor family entertainment centre Funtura became major attractions for visitors. The estimated cost for this project was more than ₹2,000 crore. The property is owned and managed by Abu Dhabi based LuLu Group International. The shops and restaurants in LuLu Mall are franchised via Lulu Group's own retail operations company called Tablez. The head office building of Lulu group in India is in Edapally, Kochi.

== See also ==
- Lulu International Shopping Mall, Thiruvananthapuram
- Lulu International Shopping Mall, Kochi
