= Ethan D'Souza =

Emirati cricketer (born 2006)

Personal information
- Full name: Ethan Carl D'Souza
- Born: March 17, 2006 (age 20); Abu Dhabi, United Arab Emirates
- Batting: Left-handed
- Role: Batsman

International information
- National side: United Arab Emirates (2023–present)
- ODI debut (cap 106): 9 June 2023 v West Indies
- Last ODI: 6 July 2023 v United States
- T20I debut (cap 86): 21 May 2025 v Bangladesh
- Last T20I: 30 August 2025 v Pakistan

Domestic team information
- Years: Team
- 2022–present: Team Abu Dhabi
- 2025–present: Sharjah Warriors
- Source: ESPNcricinfo, 6 January 2024

Ethan Carl D'Souza (born 17 March 2006) is an Emirati cricketer, who is a left-handed batsman. He plays for Team Abu Dhabi in domestic cricket. He made his international debut for the United Arab Emirates cricket team in 2023.

== Early life ==
Ethan was born to John D’Souza and Sharmila. He started playing cricket at the age of three, with his father guiding him in his cricket journey. He received cricket training from Zayed Cricket Academy. He was also a student of St. Joseph's School and Abu Dhabi Indian School Branch 1, Al Wathba.

== Career ==
In September 2022, when he was just 16 years old, he was signed by Team Abu Dhabi to play for them in the 2022 Abu Dhabi T10. He made his T10 debut on 23 November 2022, against Deccan Gladiators. With this, the 16-year-old became the youngest player ever to represent Team Abu Dhabi in Abu Dhabi T10.

Ethan led Team Abu Dhabi to victory in the 2023 U19 ECB Inter-Emirates Tournament. Consequently, in May 2023, he earned his maiden call-up to the UAE cricket team for their series against the West Indies. He made his One Day International (ODI) debut for UAE on 9 June 2023, against the West Indies. In June 2023, he was named in UAE's squad for the 2023 Cricket World Cup Qualifier. In August 2023, he was named in UAE's squad for their Twenty20 International (T20I) series against New Zealand. In December 2023, he was selected to play for UAE in the 2023 ACC Under-19 Asia Cup.
