= Lulu Mall, Palakkad =

Shopping mall in Kerala, India

LuLu Mall Palakkad
- Address: NH544, Kazhchaparambu, Kannadi, Palakkad 678701
- Opened: 18 December 2023
- Owner: LuLu Group International
- Num. of anchor tenants: 3
- Website: Official website

Lulu Mall, Palakkad is a shopping mall located in Palakkad, Kerala, India. It is the third lulu mall in the state of Kerala, located on the Kochi-Salem national highway, around 9km away from city centre in Kannadi, spanning at 2 lakh sq.ft. The mall was inaugurated in December 2023 and houses shops for both domestic and international brands as well as a multi-cuisine food court among other amenities. The property is owned and managed by Abu Dhabi based LuLu Group International.

== Features ==
The major attraction of the mall is the Lulu Hypermarket spreading at an area of one lakh square feet. The mall also has a Lulu Fashion Store, Lulu Connect and a Funtura game area along with a dining area with different food and beverage outlets that can seat 250 people at a time. There is also an extensive two- storied parking area below the mall, that can accommodate around 500 cars.
