= Kochi Marriot Hotel =

Hotel in Kochi, India

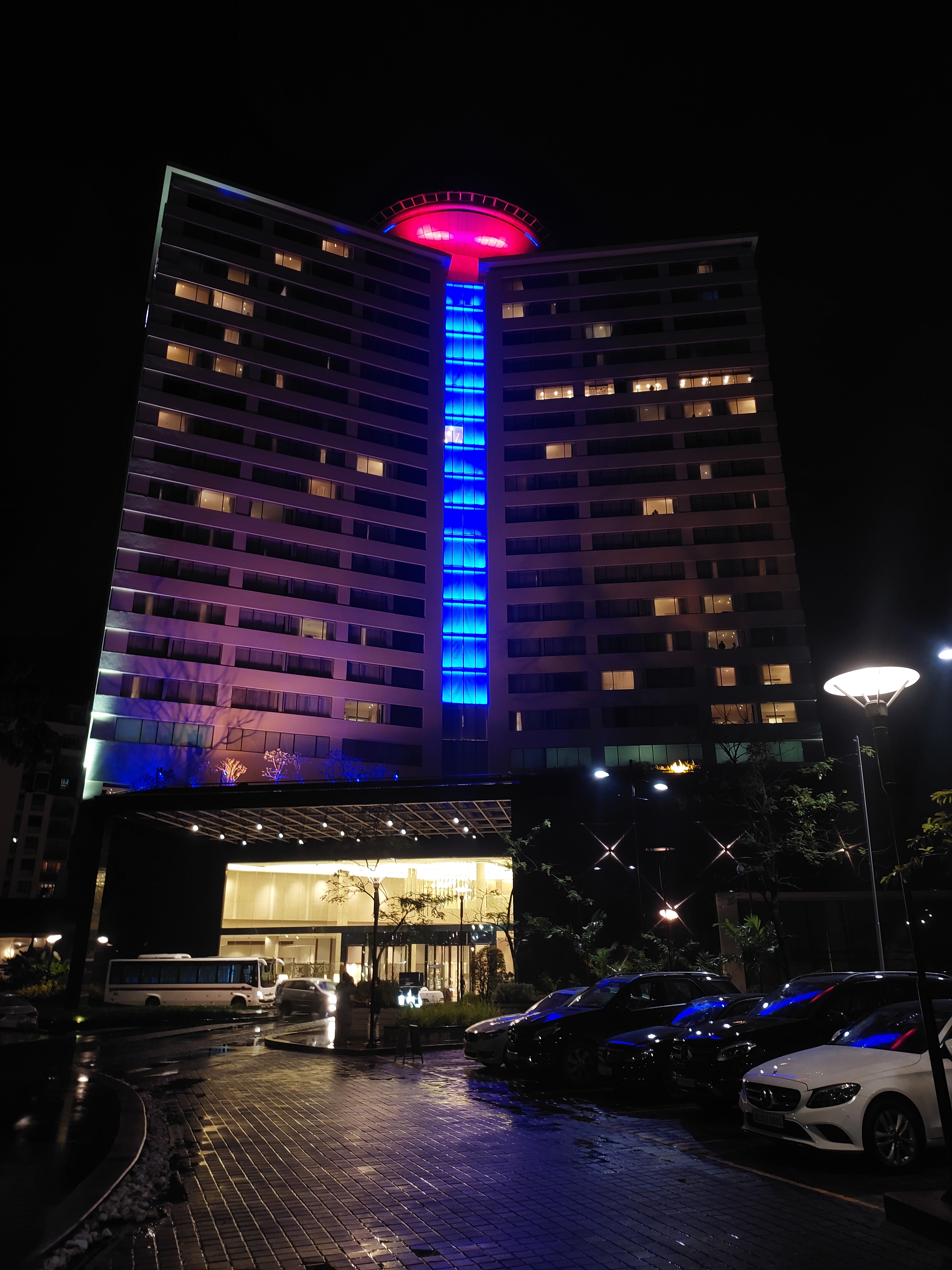
- Hotel chain: Marriott Hotels & Resorts

General information
- Classification: 5 stars
- Location: Edappally, Kochi, Kerala, India
- Opening: December 2014
- Owner: Lulu Group International
- Operator: Marriott Hotels & Resorts

Technical details
- Floor count: 27

Design and construction
- Architect: Atkins

Other information
- Number of rooms: 274
- Number of suites: 27

Kochi Marriot Hotel is a luxury five-star hotel in the city of Kochi, in India. Owned by Lulu Group International, the property is situated adjacent to the Lulu Mall Kochi in Edappally and was the second Marriot property to be opened in Kochi after the Courtyard by Marriott, Kochi. The hotel which was opened in 2014 consists of 274 rooms and 27 suites. It is managed by Marriott Hotels & Resorts and is their fifth flagship hotel in India.

== Overview ==
Kochi Marriot hotel was designed by the UK-based architectural firm Atkins. It is located adjacent to Lulu Shopping Mall, Kochi. The hotel features an outdoor swimming pool, spa, a 24-hour fitness centre, an executive lounge, and multiple meeting and event venues, including the Diamond Grand Ballroom. It also has 10 event venues capable of hosting conferences, weddings, and social events together with five restaurants and one bar.

== See also ==
- Lulu Mall, Kochi
- Marriott Hotels & Resorts
