= St Joseph's School (Abu Dhabi) =

Catholic Private School in Abu Dhabi, United Arab Emirates

Coordinates: 24.44839°N 54.38523°E

St. Joseph's School
- Abu Dhabi; United Arab Emirates

Information
- Type: Private
- Motto: Shine Where You Are
- Established: 1967
- Principal: Sr. Suranjana (Prestina Rocha) CSST
- Grades: 1 to 12
- Gender: Boys (1–6) & Girls (1–12)
- Language: English
- Website: stjosephsschool.ae

St Joseph's School (SJS) is a Roman Catholic primary and secondary school in Abu Dhabi, United Arab Emirates and is next to St. Joseph's Cathedral, Abu Dhabi.

== Overview ==
The school was established in 1967 and is managed by the Apostolic Vicariate of the Roman Catholic Church to Southern Arabia ( previously known as Apostolic Vicariate to Arabia ). After its establishment, the school was managed by Giovanni Bernardo Gremoli, afterward succeeded by Paul Hinder. The school, always associated with the Roman Catholic Church, was located initially in the church building on the Abu Dhabi Corniche. Following the decision of the local government that the site is altered, the present foundation was laid for church and school buildings on 19 March 1981, and dedicated to Saint Joseph, the foster father of Jesus Christ, whose feast-day is celebrated on the same day.

== Curriculum ==
The school is aligned with the CBSE curriculum. In addition to the standard subjects found in UAE schools, they also teach Hindi.

== Notable alumni ==
- Rahman (actor)
- Ethan D'Souza (cricketer)
