= Kannadi =

Gram panchayat in Palakkad, Kerala, India

Coordinates: 9°57′N 76°49′E

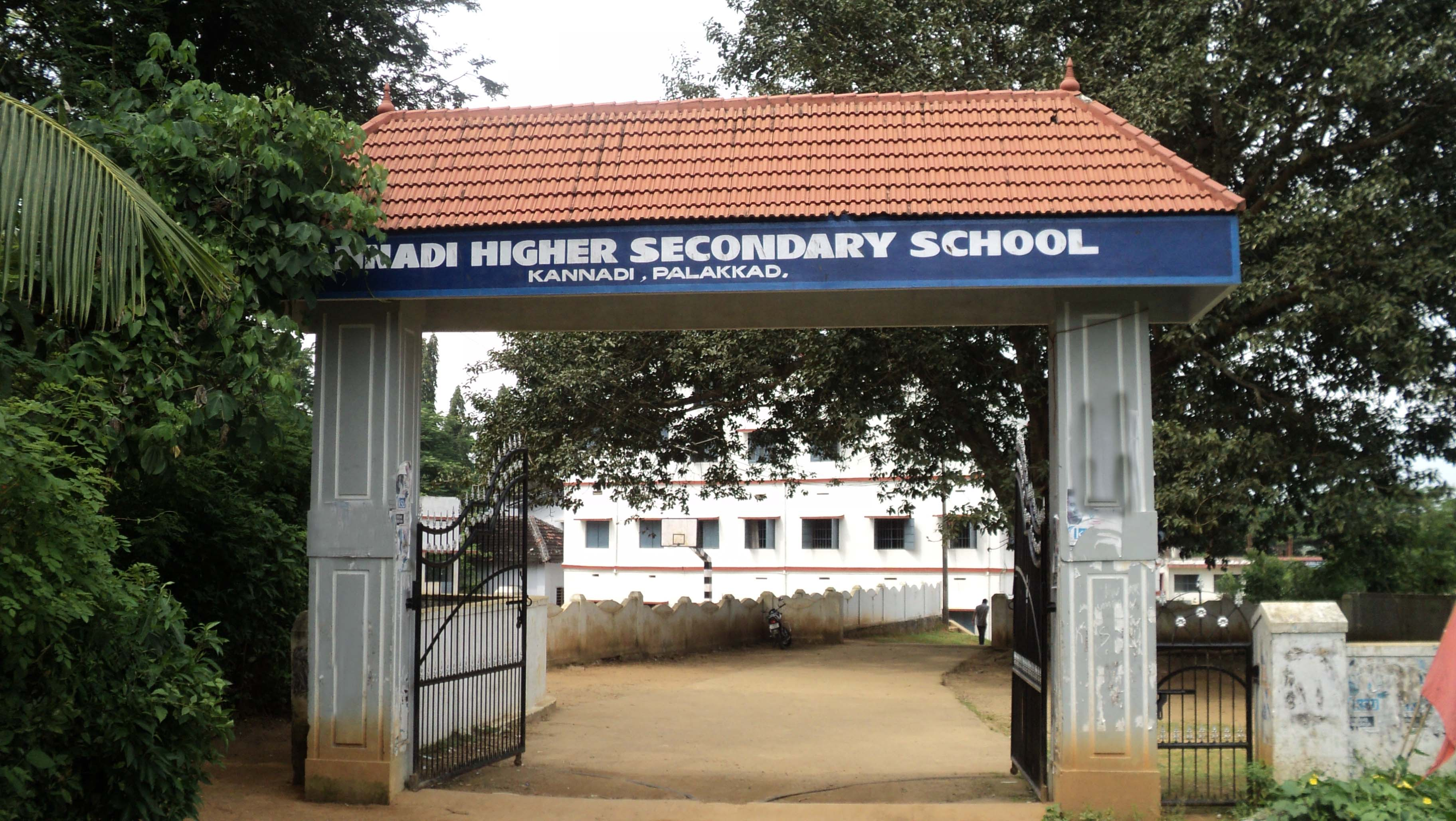
Kannadi School

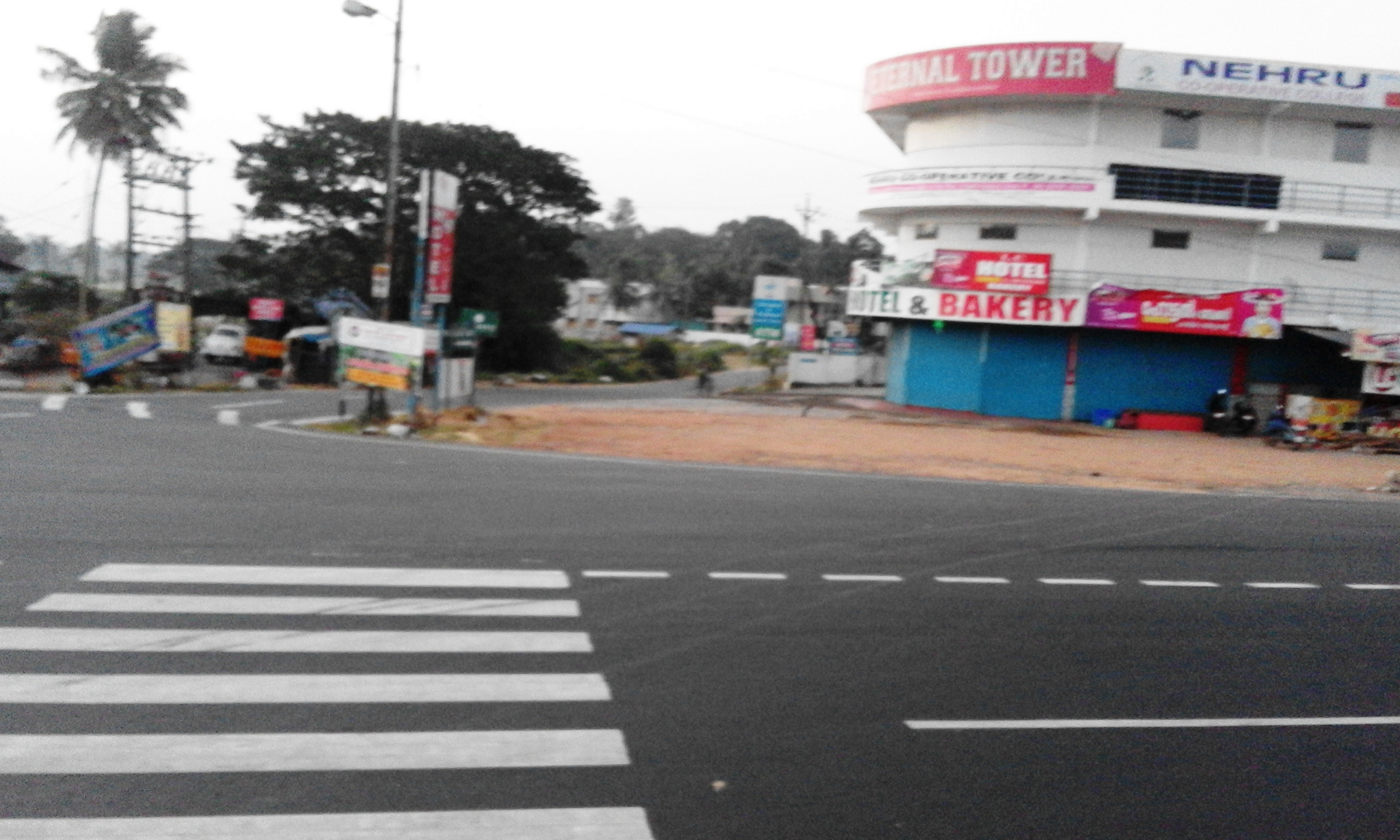
Kazhchapparambu Junction, Kannadi

Kannadi is a gram panchayat in the Palakkad district, state of Kerala, India. The third Lulu Mall in Kerala, Lulu International Shopping Mall, Palakkad is located in Kannadi. It is a local government organisation that serves the villages of Kannadi-I and Kannadi-II.

== Demographics ==
As of 2011 India census, Kannadi-I had a population of 15,422 with 7,541 males and 7,881 females.

As of 2011 India census, Kannadi-II had a population of 11,228 with 5,510 males and 5,718 females.
