= Edappally Junction =

Road junction in Kochi, Kerala, India

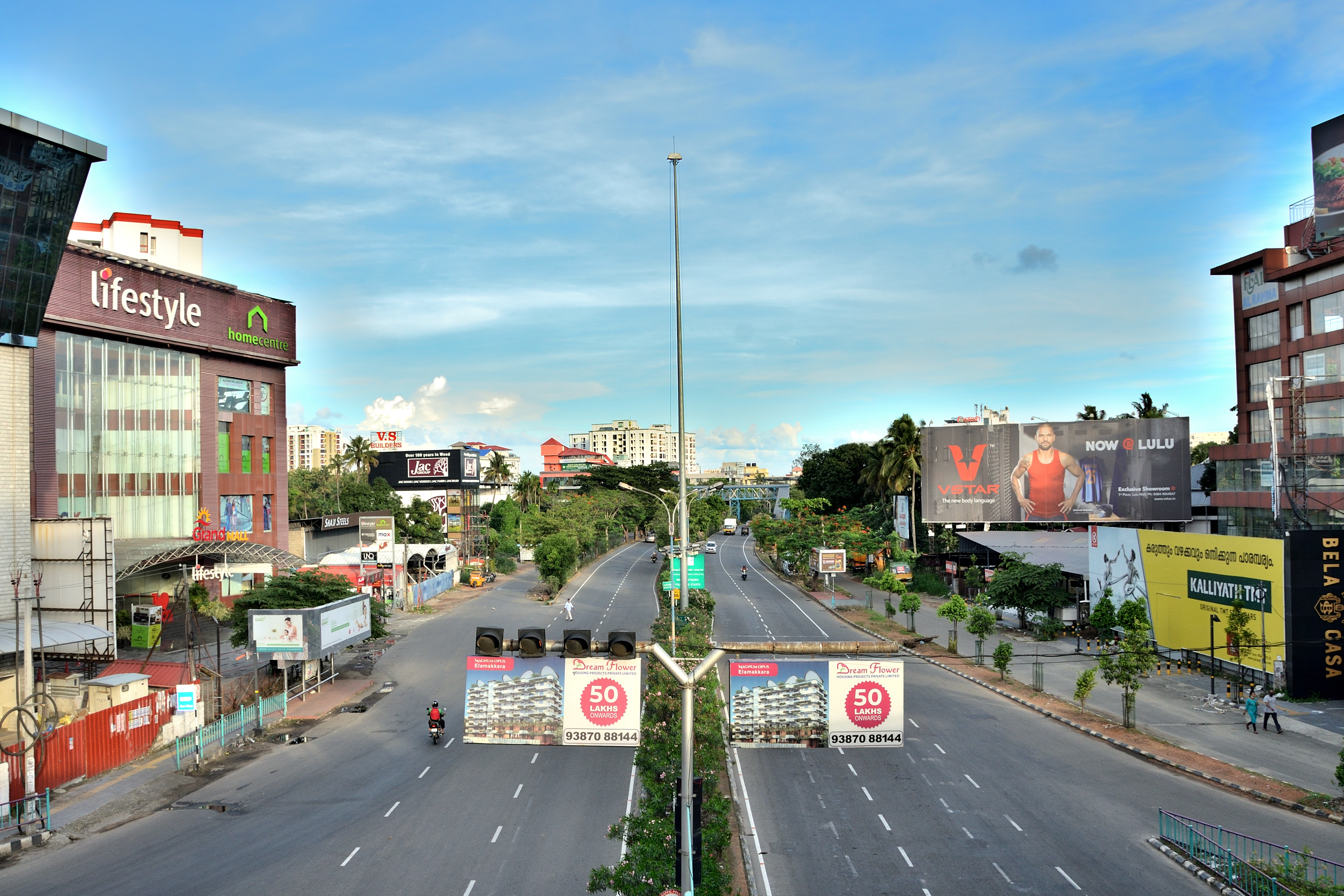
- NH 66 towards Vyttila
- Interactive map of Edappally Junction

Location
- Edappally, Kochi, Kerala
- Coordinates: 10.024550°N 76.308045°E
- Roads at junction: NH 66; NH 544

Construction
- Type: Intersection
- Maintained by: NHAI

Edappally Junction is a road junction at Edappally in Kochi, Kerala, India, where National Highway 66 and National Highway 544 meet. It has long been one of the most congested points on the highway network in the city, and flyovers have been built at the junction to ease traffic.

== Roads ==
National Highway 544, the highway from Salem in Tamil Nadu to Kochi, ends at the junction, where it meets National Highway 66, the highway that runs along India's west coast. The section of NH 66 that skirts the centre of Kochi, the Kochi Bypass, begins here and runs about 16-kilometre (9.9 mi) south to Aroor. Until the renumbering of India's national highways in 2010, the Salem–Kochi route was numbered NH 47 and the coastal route through Edappally was NH 17.

== Flyovers ==
A 433-metre (1,421 ft) flyover at the junction, built in connection with the Kochi Metro project, was inaugurated in September 2016.

In October 2022 the National Highways Authority of India began widening the Edappally–Moothakunnam section of NH 66 to six lanes. The work at the junction includes two 650-metre (2,130 ft) flyovers, each with a 50-metre (160 ft) wide underpass, intended to ease the bottleneck; the project was about 60% complete by May 2025.

== Places of interest ==
The Lulu International Shopping Mall, at Edappally on the bypass, opened in March 2013 with a built-up area of about 2,500,000 sq ft (230,000 m^{2}); it was billed as the largest shopping mall in India at the time.

The St George's Forane Church, a Syro-Malabar Catholic pilgrimage church first built in the 6th century, is a landmark near the junction.

== See also ==
- Transport in Kochi
- Vyttila Mobility Hub
- List of national highways in India
