= Grand Hyatt Kochi Bolgatty =

Hotel in Kochi, India

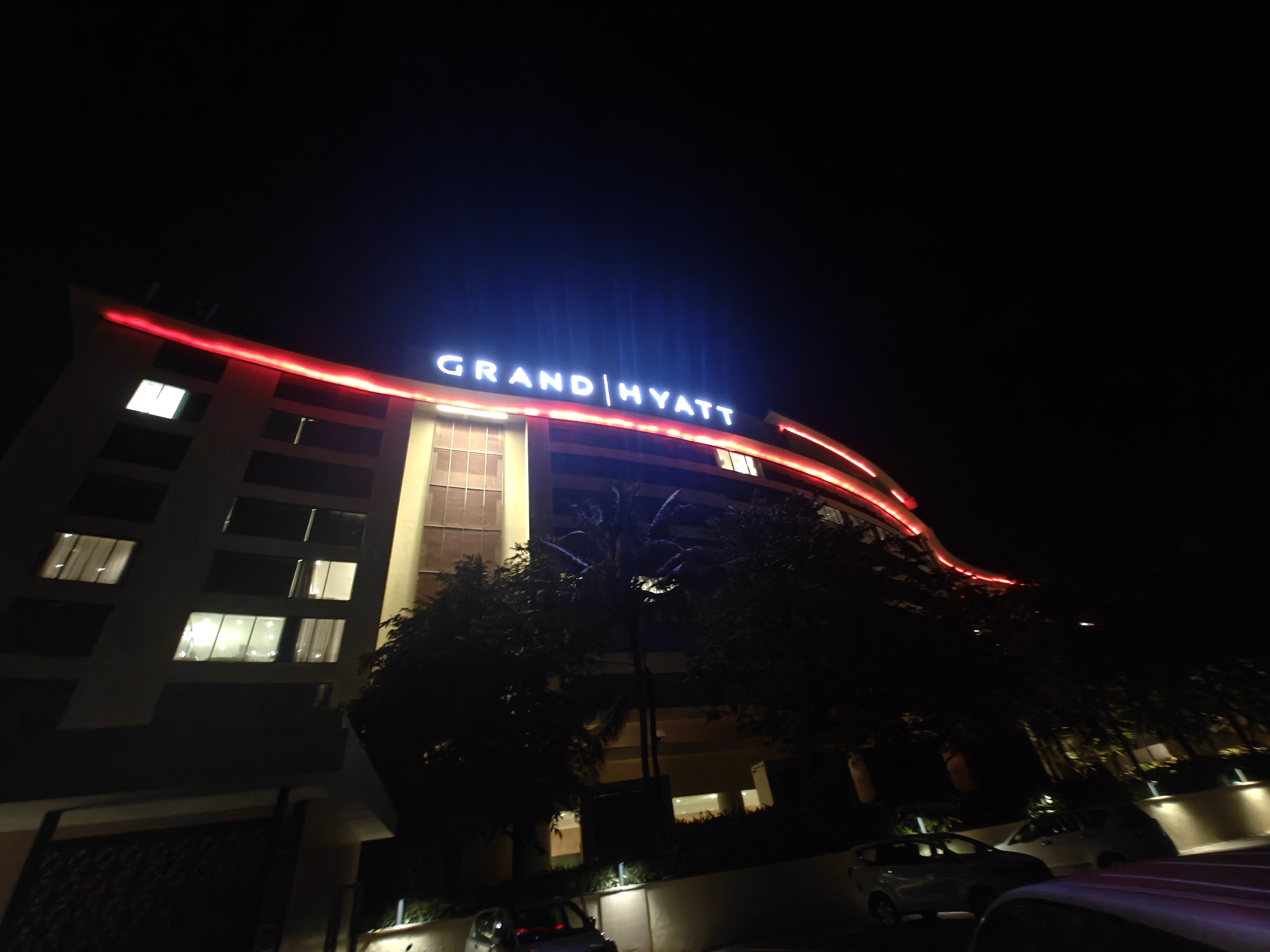
- Grand Hyatt Kochi Bolgatty in 2026
- Hotel chain: Hyatt Hotels Corporation

General information
- Classification: 5 stars
- Location: Mulavukad, Kochi, Kerala, India
- Opening: April 2018
- Owner: Lulu Group International
- Operator: Hyatt Hotels Corporation

Technical details
- Floor count: 11

Design and construction
- Architects: Wimberly Allison Tong and Goo UK Limited

Other information
- Number of rooms: 264
- Number of suites: 38

Grand Hyatt Kochi Bolgatty is a luxury five-star hotel in the city of Kochi, in India. Owned by Lulu Group International, the waterfront property is situated in the Bolgatty Island adjacent to the Lulu Bolgatty International Convention Centre. The hotel was opened in 2018 and consists of 264 rooms and 38 suites. Managed by Hyatt Hotels Corporation, it is the third Grand Hyatt branded hotel in India and one of the group's flagship properties in the country.

== Architecture and infrastructure ==
Grand Hyatt Kochi consists of 264 rooms, 38 suites, four villas, and three ballrooms. The hotel's arches and artwork's design has influence of Kerala. The latticed screens, chandeliers, carpets and gold accents has Arabic influence. Design elements such as dark wood muted colours and straight lines draw is inspired from the west.

The hotel features an outdoor swimming pool and children’s pool, an outdoor yoga lawn, a waterfront amphitheater, a beauty salon, exploration gardens including a spice garden, a multi-purpose court, a children’s play area, and three helipads.

== See also ==
- Hyatt
- LuLu Group International
- Bolgatty Palace and Island Resort
