= Lulu Mall, Kozhikode =

Shopping mall in Kerala, India

LuLu Mall Kozhikode
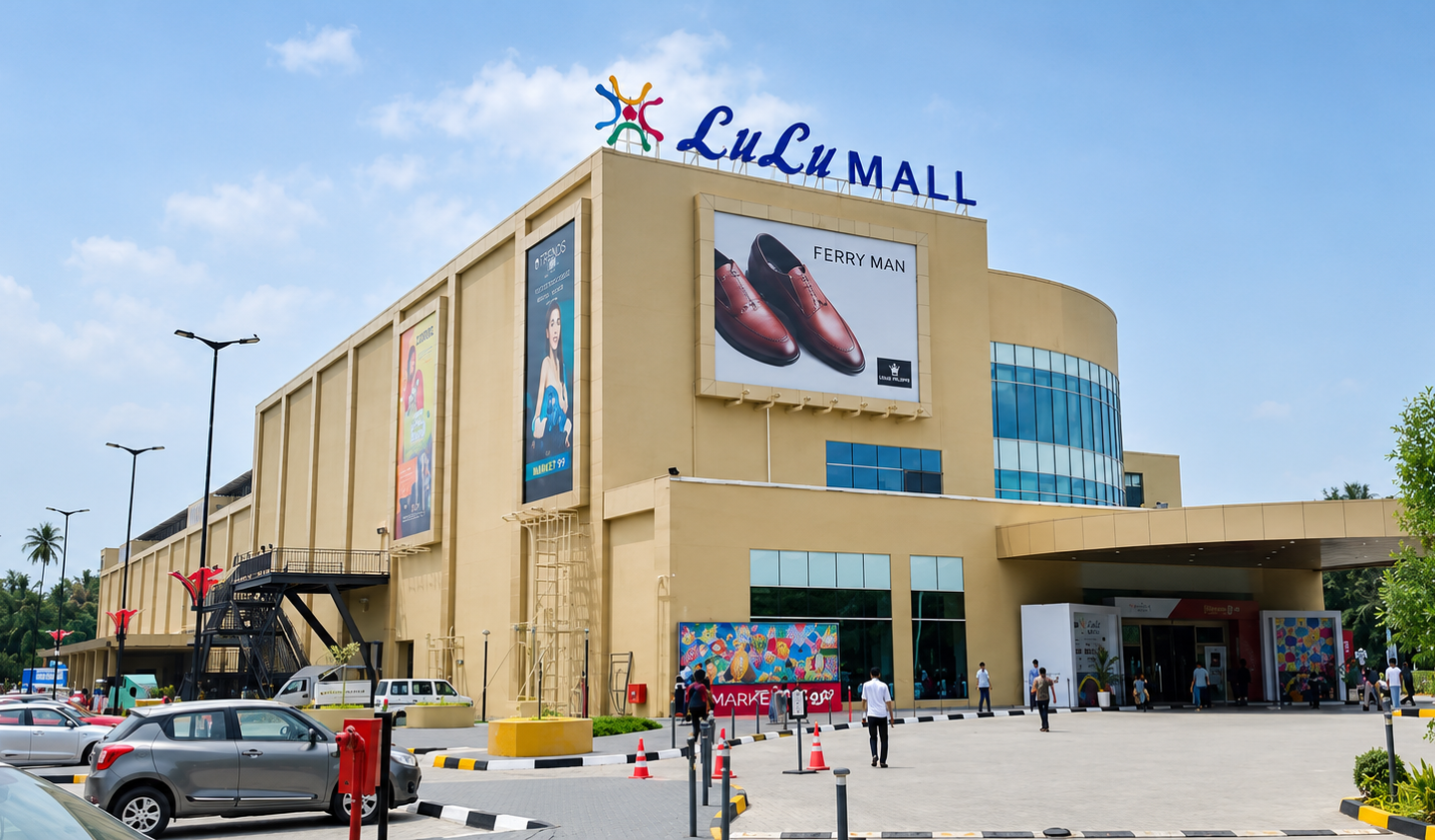
- Lulu mall calicut in 2026
- Coordinates: 11°14′26″N 75°48′9″E
- Opened: 8 September 2024
- Owner: LuLu Group International
- Num. of stores: 2

Lulu Mall, Kozhikode is a shopping mall located in Kozhikode, Kerala, India. It is the fourth Lulu mall in the state of Kerala spanning at 3.5 lakh sq.ft.

The mall was inaugurated in September 2024 and houses shops for both domestic and international brands as well as a multi-cuisine food court among other amenities. The property is owned and managed by Abu Dhabi-based LuLu Group International.

== Overview ==
Lulu Mall Kozhikode was developed with an investment of about ₹800 crore and has a reported built-up area of approximately 350,000 square feet. The three-storey complex includes a LuLu Hypermarket, LuLu Fashion Store and LuLu Connect, alongside outlets operated by national, international and regional brands. The hypermarket occupies about 150,000 square feet. In addition to retail outlets, the mall contains a food court with seating for more than 500 people and an indoor gaming and entertainment centre, Funtura. The complex also provides parking for about 1,800 vehicles and has five self-checkout counters in the hypermarket.
