= Jashanmal =

UAE consumer goods company

Jashanmal group
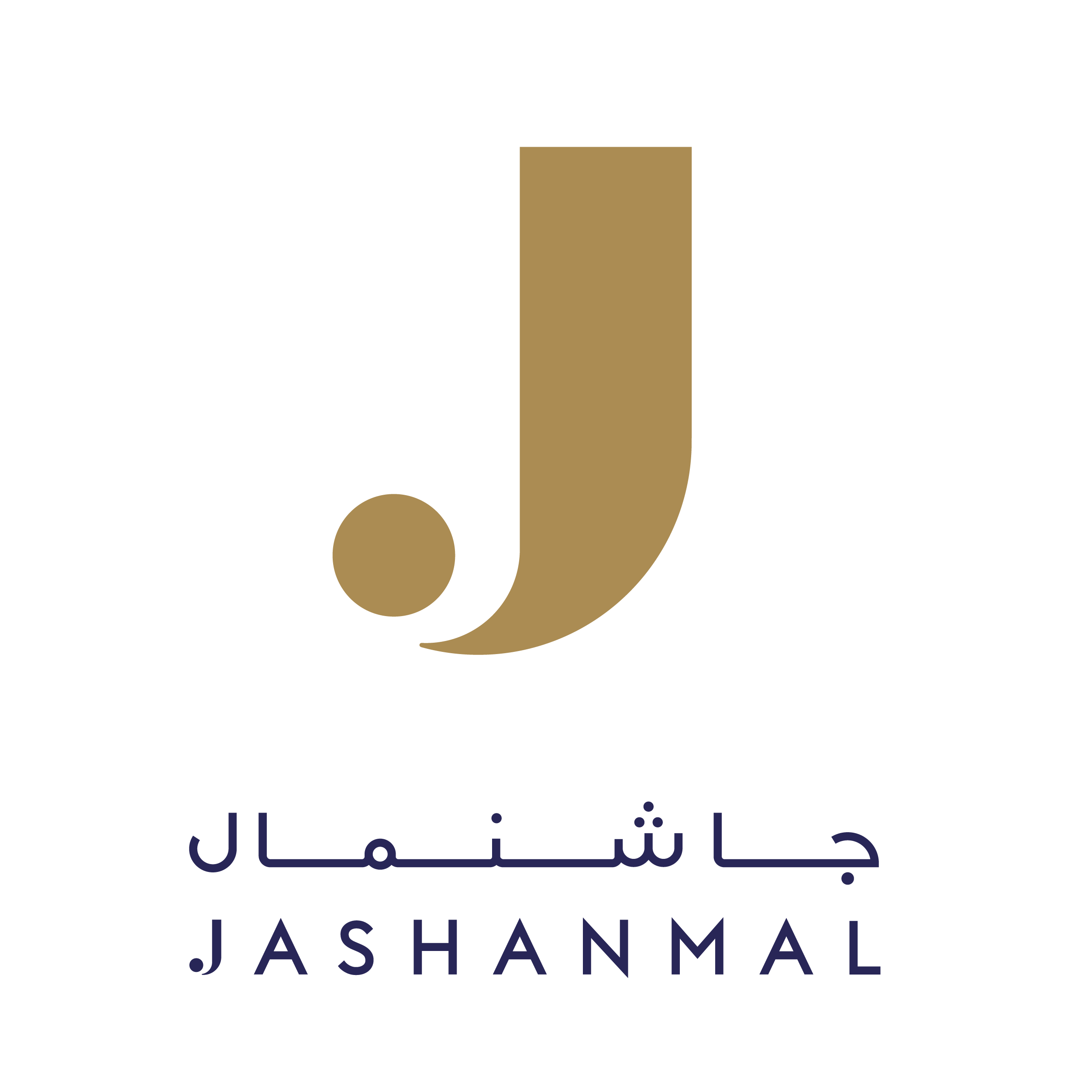
- Type: Privately held company
- Industry: Retail
- Founded: 1919
- Founder: Rao Sahib Jashanmal Jhangiani
- Headquarters: Dubai, UAE
- Area served: Worldwide
- Key people: Abdallah Mohammed Al Mazroui Chairman; Tony Jashanmal Exec. Director
- Products: Department Store
- Revenue: ▲$4.59 billion (2011–12)
- Net income: ▲$2.23 billion (2011–12)
- Total assets: ▲$7.7 billion (2011–12)
- Owner: Tony Jashanmal & Partners
- Number of employees: 2200 (2016–17)
- Website: www.jashanmalgroup.com

The Jashanmal Group is a wholesale distributor of consumer goods and services in the Persian Gulf region. The company, established in 1919 by Rao Sahib Jashanmal with its first store in Basra, Iraq as a general store selling many of the products that are still sold in the stores today. Expansion through the GCC followed the path of oil discovery, first into Kuwait in 1934, then Bahrain in 1935 and subsequently into UAE, with stores in Dubai in 1956 and Abu Dhabi in 1964. In the environment of fast expanding markets Jashanmal evolved from solely a retailer to also specializing in the wholesale and distribution of consumer products.

Today the Jashanmal Group is active across the Arab states of the Persian Gulf and India, headquartered in Dubai, United Arab Emirates, and operates over 100 stores and through an extensive distribution and wholesale business supplies over 1,000 retailers across segments from Duty Free to Mass Market to Mid-Market and High-end Retail.

They represent various global retail franchises represented in the region as well as operating a newspaper and periodicals division which oversees the marketing and distribution of leading books, magazines, and newspapers in the Persian Gulf through direct distribution and through retail chains including the Jashanmal Bookstores. Business partners include Levant, Higgs and Reed Aviation. The Jashanmal Group is also in a joint venture with Japan's Overseas Courier Services (OCS). The Jashanmal Group employs over 1,000 people in its various divisions and countries.
