= Grand Hyatt =

Hotel brand

- Type: Subsidiary
- Industry: Hospitality
- Founded: 1980; 46 years ago
- Founder: Jay Pritzker
- Parent: Hyatt Hotels Corporation
- Website: www.hyatt.com/brands/grand-hyatt

Grand Hyatt is an American upscale hotel chain owned by Hyatt Hotels Corporation. Positioned within Hyatt's full-service luxury category, Grand Hyatt properties operate primarily in major gateway cities and resort destinations worldwide.

== History ==
The Grand Hyatt brand was introduced by Hyatt in 1980 to cater to high-volume business travelers, conventions, and upscale leisure guests. The first property to bear the name was the Grand Hyatt New York, located adjacent to Grand Central Terminal, which opened in September 1980 following a major redevelopment of the former Commodore Hotel by Jay Pritzker and Donald Trump.

Over the following decades, Hyatt expanded the Grand Hyatt brand internationally, opening large-scale hotel properties across Asia, Europe, North America, and the Middle East. Notable expansion projects included flagship properties such as Grand Hyatt Hong Kong, Grand Hyatt Tokyo, and Grand Hyatt Dubai.

== Overview and operations ==
Grand Hyatt properties are characteristically large-scale developments, often featuring hundreds of guest rooms, multi-story open-air atriums, extensive meeting and banquet facilities, and multiple signature dining venues. The brand functions as a primary venue line for major international conferences, corporate events, and weddings due to its emphasis on large ballroom space and full-service event support.

In terms of market positioning within Hyatt's tier structure, Grand Hyatt operates above standard upscale service lines like Hyatt Regency and alongside boutique luxury brands like Park Hyatt and Alila.

== Notable properties ==
- Grand Hyatt Mumbai: A 547-room luxury complex in Santacruz, Mumbai, India, featuring an 18-acre estate and extensive public art displays.
- Grand Hyatt Kochi Bolgatty: A 264-room waterfront hotel located on Bolgatty Island in Kochi, India, adjacent to the Lulu Bolgatty International Convention Centre.
- Grand Hyatt Goa: A 313-room 5-star deluxe resort overlooking Bambolim Bay in North Goa, India.
- Grand Hyatt Dubai: A 674-room hotel and resort complex situated within 37 acres of landscaped gardens in Dubai, United Arab Emirates.
