= Al Wahda (newspaper) =

Emirati daily newspaper

- Type: Daily newspaper
- Founder: Rashed Al Qubesi
- Publisher: Al Wahda Press House
- Founded: 5 August 1973; 52 years ago
- Political alignment: Pro-government
- Language: Arabic
- Headquarters: Abu Dhabi
- Country: United Arab Emirates
- Website: Al Wahda

Al Wahda (Arabic الوحدة; Unity) is an Arabic daily newspaper published in Abu Dhabi, United Arab Emirates. Founded in 1973, the daily is one of the oldest publications in the country.

== History and profile ==
Al Wahda was established by Rashed Al Qubesi as a 12-page daily, and the first issue appeared on 5 August 1973. As of 2013 Al Qubesi was also owner and editor of the newspaper. The publisher of the daily is Al Wahda Press House. The paper has its headquarters in Abu Dhabi.

Al Wahda has a pro-government stance and in fact, is sponsored by the Emirati government. The paper has 20 pages and offers political news, local news and news on economy, sports, religion and culture. Its estimated circulation in 2003 was 20,000 copies.
