= Al Wahda Mall =

Shopping center in Abu Dhabi, United Arab Emirates

- الوحدة مول
- Location: Abu Dhabi, United Arab Emirates
- Coordinates: 24°28′13″N 54°22′22″E
- Opened: 5 June 2007; 19 years ago
- Manager: Siddharth Khanna
- Floors: 4 (according to floor plan)
- Parking: 4,000 spaces
- Website: https://alwahda-mall.com/

Al Wahda Mall (Arabic: الوحدة مول) is a shopping center located in Abu Dhabi, United Arab Emirates. Opened on 5 June 2007, this mall is owned by Al Wahda Sports Club, Abu Dhabi, and managed by Lulu Group International. It is located along Old Airport Road (Sheikh Rashid Bin Saeed Street) near Hazza' Bin Zayed The First Street.

== About ==
As of 2023, this mall has a size of 3.3 million square feet (307,000 square meters) in total area, with over 480 brand stores, and over 20 million visits annually. This mall also holds many awards, such as "Best Shopping Mall in Abu Dhabi”, multiple Gold & Silver Awards, etc. Apart from that, Grand Millennium, a 5-star hotel, is connected directly to and from the mall.

== Extension ==
The mall's extension opened publicly on 5 September 2012, with more than 200 stores newly opened and after leasing more than 90% of retail space. From its appearance, it's a separate building with another valet parking below the main sky bridge that connects the two buildings. The main sky bridge contains some shops and most of the floors.

== Fire ==
In April 2025, at approximately 4:00pm, a fire broke out on the mall premises. It was brought under control by teams from Abu Dhabi Police and the Civil Defence Authority.

No injuries were reported. Cooling and smoke removal operations were completed, and after an investigation it was reported to have been caused by an electrical fault, a transformer overload.
