= M. A. Yusuff Ali =

Indian billionaire businessman (born 1955)

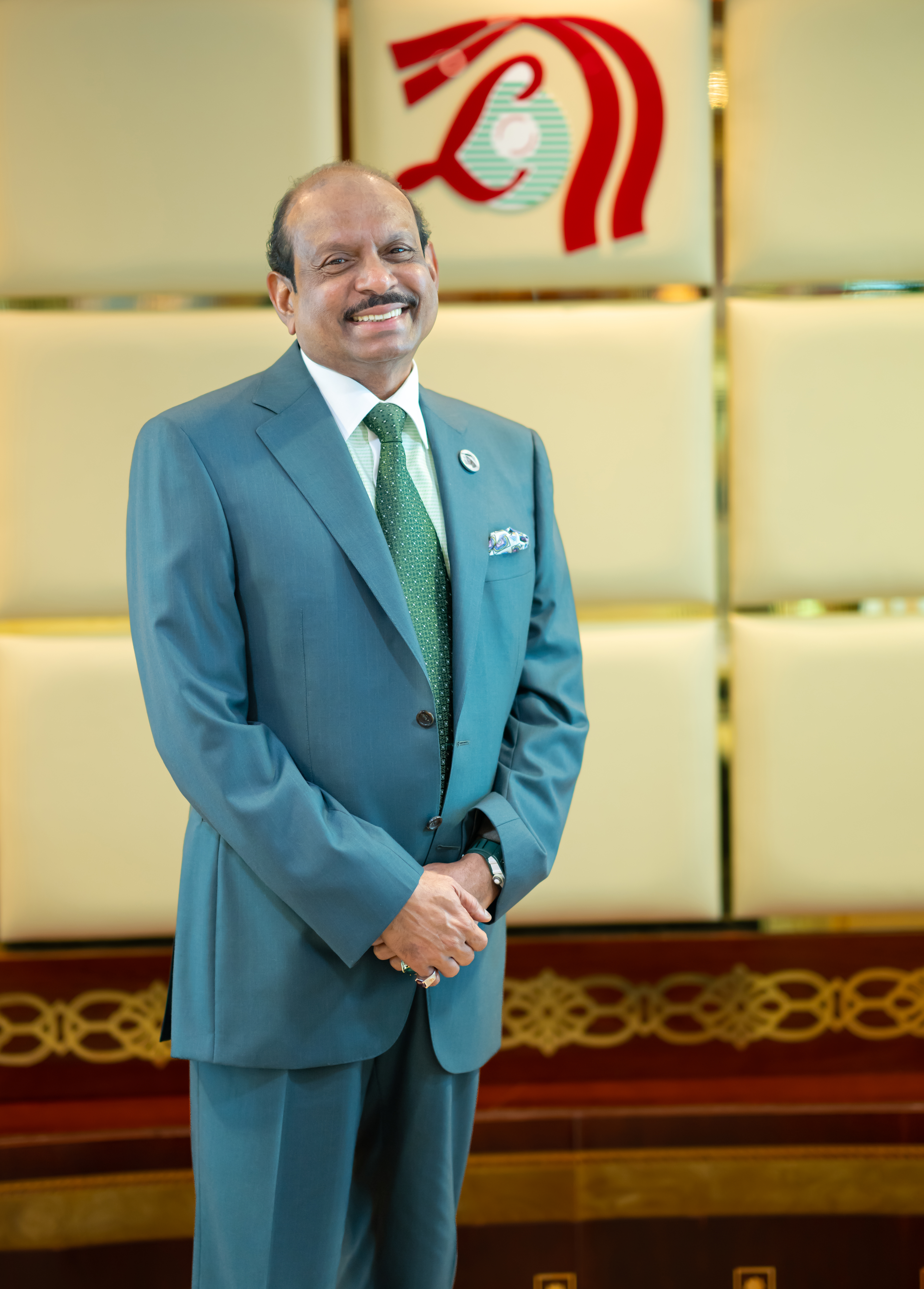
- Yusuff Ali in 2023
- Born: Yusuff Ali Musaliam Veettil Abdul Kader; 15 November 1955 (age 70); Nattika, State of Travancore–Cochin (present day Thrissur, Kerala), India
- Occupation: Businessman
- Title: Chairman of Lulu Retail Holdings; Chairman and managing director of Lulu International Holdings
- Spouse: Shabira Yusuff Ali
- Children: 3
- Relatives: Shamsheer Vayalil (son-in-law)
- Website: Website

Yusuff Ali Musaliam Veettil Abdul Kader, popularly known as M. A. Yusuff Ali (born 15 November 1955), is an Indian businessman and billionaire. He is the chairman of Lulu Retail Holdings, the operator of the LuLu Hypermarket chain, which listed on the Abu Dhabi Securities Exchange in November 2024. He is also chairman and managing director of its parent company, Lulu International Holdings. Lulu Retail has annual revenue of about US$7.9 billion and operates 267 stores in the Gulf region. According to Forbes Middle East, Yusuff Ali was ranked No. 1 in Top 100 Indian business owners in the Arab World 2018.

In 2006, he started his large business ventures in India, by starting a convention centre cum hotel at his native place Thrissur, Kerala namely Lulu Convention Centre. In 2013, Yusuff Ali acquired 4.99% of the Thrissur-based CSB Bank and 4.99% shares of Thrissur based Dhanlaxmi Bank. Also in 2013, he increased his stake in the Aluva-based Federal Bank to 4.47%. In 2014 Yusuff Ali acquired 2% stake of South Indian Bank – another Thrissur based bank. In 2016, Yusuff Ali purchased the Scotland Yard Building in London. As of 2013, he held a 9.37% share in Cochin International Airport. He also sits on the airport's board. He has bought a 10% stake in the UK-based trading firm, East India Company, and a 40% stake in its fine foods subsidiary for around $85 million in total.

The Lulu Bolgatty International Convention Centre on Bolghatty Island in Kochi is one of the largest convention centres in South Asia, along with Grand Hyatt hotel in the same campus. Lulu group's First Mall in India was LuLu International Shopping Mall, Kochi started in 2013, then in 2019, he started shopping mall in India at Triprayar, Thrissur, the Y Mall. In October 2021, Lulu group opened their second mall in India, Global Mall, at Rajaji Nagar, Bengaluru, Karnataka. In December 2021, Lulu group opened their third mall in India at Thiruvananthapuram, Kerala. In July 2022, Lulu group opened their fourth mall in India at Lucknow, Uttar Pradesh. And in 2023, LuLu Group launched a new hypermarket and mall in Hyderabad, Palakkad and Coimbatore.

In October 2026, Forbes ranked Yusuff Ali 47th on its list of India's 100 richest people, with a net worth of US$5.75 billion.

== Early life ==
Yusuff Ali was born on 15 November 1955 at Nattika, Thrissur, in the erstwhile State of Travancore–Cochin. He studied at St. Xavier's High School in Karanchira. He holds a diploma in Business Management and Administration.

After his studies, he left India in 1973 for Abu Dhabi, where his paternal uncle, M. K. Abdullah, the chairman and the founder of the LuLu Group of Companies, was doing business. He developed the import and wholesale distribution of the group and ventured into the supermarket business by launching the Lulu Hypermarket.

Yusuff Ali started his first LuLu Hypermarket in the 1990s, a time when the UAE's retail sector witnessed a major change, with the traditional groceries and supermarkets yielding place to large neighbourhood stores and hypermarkets. While the entry of Continent (now Carrefour) in 1995 changed the face of retail business in Dubai, Yusuff Ali took charge of Abu Dhabi's retail sector by rolling out LuLu Hypermarket.

== LuLu Group International ==
LuLu Group International commenced its operations as a family business venture. After joining the business, Yusuff Ali diversified the business to include the import and distribution of frozen products from Europe and the United States. The products were available not only in Abu Dhabi but also in other Emirates. The business was soon expanded to include both food and non-food categories. The group also started cold storage, meat, and food processing plants, large-scale import and distribution to hotel groups, catering companies, and shipping services. By the 1980s, the group had a sizable share of the wholesale and retail food market in the UAE.

The group has grown into an international group with operations spread over three continents. The group's flagship retail chain of LuLu Hypermarkets and Supermarkets is one of the major players in the Middle East retail sector, with 267 stores in the Gulf Cooperation Council countries as of 2026. Apart from the hypermarkets, supermarkets and department stores, the group also owns several shopping malls, namely, Khalidiyah Mall, Al Raha Mall, Al Wahda Mall, Mushriff Mall, Madinat Zayed Mall, Mazyad Mall, Ramli Mall, RAK Mall, Dana Mall, Al Foah Mall, Al Khor Mall, Riyadh Avenue Mall in Saudi Arabia and Oman Avenues Mall spread across nations of the GCC.

LuLu International Shopping Mall in Kochi, Kerala was opened on 10 March 2013. It is the group's first retail venture in India. LuLu International Shopping Mall in Thiruvananthapuram was opened in 2021 & is the largest mall in India. LuLu also has malls in Palakkad, Bengaluru, Lucknow, Kottayam & so on. The group has a vast organizational structure of over 65,000 employees, representing 42 different nationalities, out of which more than 30,000 are Indians. Retail business is the mainstay of the Group with operations in major Middle Eastern and African countries like UAE, Oman, Qatar, Kuwait, Yemen, Saudi Arabia, Bahrain, Egypt and Kenya, having Retail Sourcing and manufacturing bases located in the Far East, India, Africa and Guangzhou in China. Indian operations mainly include Food Processing, Export of Food & Non food products and convention center with bases in Delhi, Mumbai, Kochi, Thiruvananthapuram, Chennai, Lucknow and Thrissur. Deloitte has ranked the Group as one of the fastest-growing retailers in the world.

In 2025, LuLu Group inaugurated Kerala's tallest twin IT towers in Kochi's Smart City, spanning 3.4 million sq ft and accommodating 25,000 professionals.

In November 2024, Lulu International Holdings sold a 25% stake in Lulu Retail Holdings in an initial public offering on the Abu Dhabi Securities Exchange. The offering was priced at the top of its range, raised about US$1.7 billion and drew around US$37 billion in orders. Shares began trading on 14 November 2024.

Yusuff Ali is a member of the board of directors of the Abu Dhabi Chamber of Commerce and Industry. He was reappointed for a fifth term in February 2026 and is the only Indian on the board.

== Philanthropy ==
Yusuff Ali is involved in many social, charitable and humanitarian activities both in India as well as in the Arab states of the Gulf. He has done various philanthropic activities. As part of its Global CSR policy, the LuLu Group joined hands with Dubai Cares and adopted schools in Gaza and Nepal. Yusuff Ali contributed and took initiative to open a multi-faith funeral centre for the Indian community in Sharjah that spread across 8.3 acres. He also took initiative to sell and promote organic products grown by the special needs community in UAE through LuLu Hypermarkets Yusuff Ali donated to the Gujarat earthquake, Tsunami Relief Fund in Asia, and Typhoon and flood relief in other parts of the world. He also donated ₹9.5 crores for relief and rehabilitation of Kerala flood victims in August 2018. He is also actively involved in ensuring the social, economic and religious welfare of expatriate Indians in the Persian Gulf region. He played a major role in finding land for the Christian community in the region to build churches, and secure cremation grounds for the Hindu populace in the Gulf region. Yusuff Ali also extended help to Indians during the amnesty period in the Persian Gulf when hundreds of Indians lost their livelihood. He helped rehabilitate people who lost their livelihood in the Kozhikode market fire as well. Yusuff Ali had pledged to donate Rs 50 million for the flood-hit south Indian state of Kerala in the event of the 2019 Kerala floods.

== Personal life ==
He is married, with three children, and lives in Abu Dhabi. His elder daughter Shabeena is married to billionaire businessman Shamsheer Vayalil. His second daughter Shafeena is married to Adeeb Ahamed who runs Lulu Financial Holdings and Twenty14 Holdings, a hospitality investment firm. Youngest daughter Shifa is married to Sharoon Shamsudheen who is into successful IT businesses.

In April 2021 the helicopter in which Yusuff Ali, his wife and three others (including the pilots), were travelling, crash landed in a swamp near Panangad (in Kochi). Ali and his wife were uninjured and were taken to a nearby hospital for first aid. The private helicopter owned by Ali had suffered a technical glitch due to adverse weather.

== Recognition and awards ==
- 2005 – Pravasi Bharatiya Samman in 2005; the highest Indian government award given to non-resident Indians.
- 2008 – Padma Shri from the Government of India.
- 2010 – "Business Man of the Year 2009–10" award instituted by the Kerala State Forum of Bankers' Clubs.
- 2012 – Lifetime Achievement Award at the inaugural Indian CEO Awards held in February.
- 2012 – Swiss Ambassador's Award 2012 for outstanding efforts in promoting Swiss-UAE relations.
- 2012 – "Most Influential Asian Business Leader in the MENA region" award by Forbes Middle East.
- 2012 – "Arab Business Leader of the Year 2012" during the third edition of the Global Arab Business Meeting held in Ras Al Khaimah.
- 2014 – Honorary D.Litt. by Aligarh Muslim University.
- 2014 – Order of Bahrain (Wisam Al Bahrain), conferred by King Hamad bin Isa Al Khalifa. The Gulf Times reported that he was the first non-Bahraini to receive it.
- 2016 – Was honoured with the archbishop Mar Gregorios Award instituted by the alumni association of Mar Ivanios College, Amicos, for his contribution to the industrial sector in 2016.
- 2018 – Honorary doctorate from Middlesex University.
- 2018 – Honorary doctorate from Mahatma Gandhi University, Kerala.
- 2021 – Was honoured with Abu Dhabi's highest civilian award, Abu Dhabi Award 2021 by Mohamed bin Zayed Al Nahyan, then Crown Prince of Abu Dhabi.
- 2021 – Yusuff Ali was granted a long-term residential visa by Qais bin Mohammed Al Yousaf, Oman's Minister of Commerce, Industry, and Investment Promotion (MOCIIP).
- 2022 – Yusuff Ali, chairman of Lulu Group, has become the first Bahrain golden residency visa recipient.

== See also ==
- LuLu Group International
- Tariq Chauhan
