= Shamsheer Vayalil =

Indian physician, entrepreneur and philanthropist

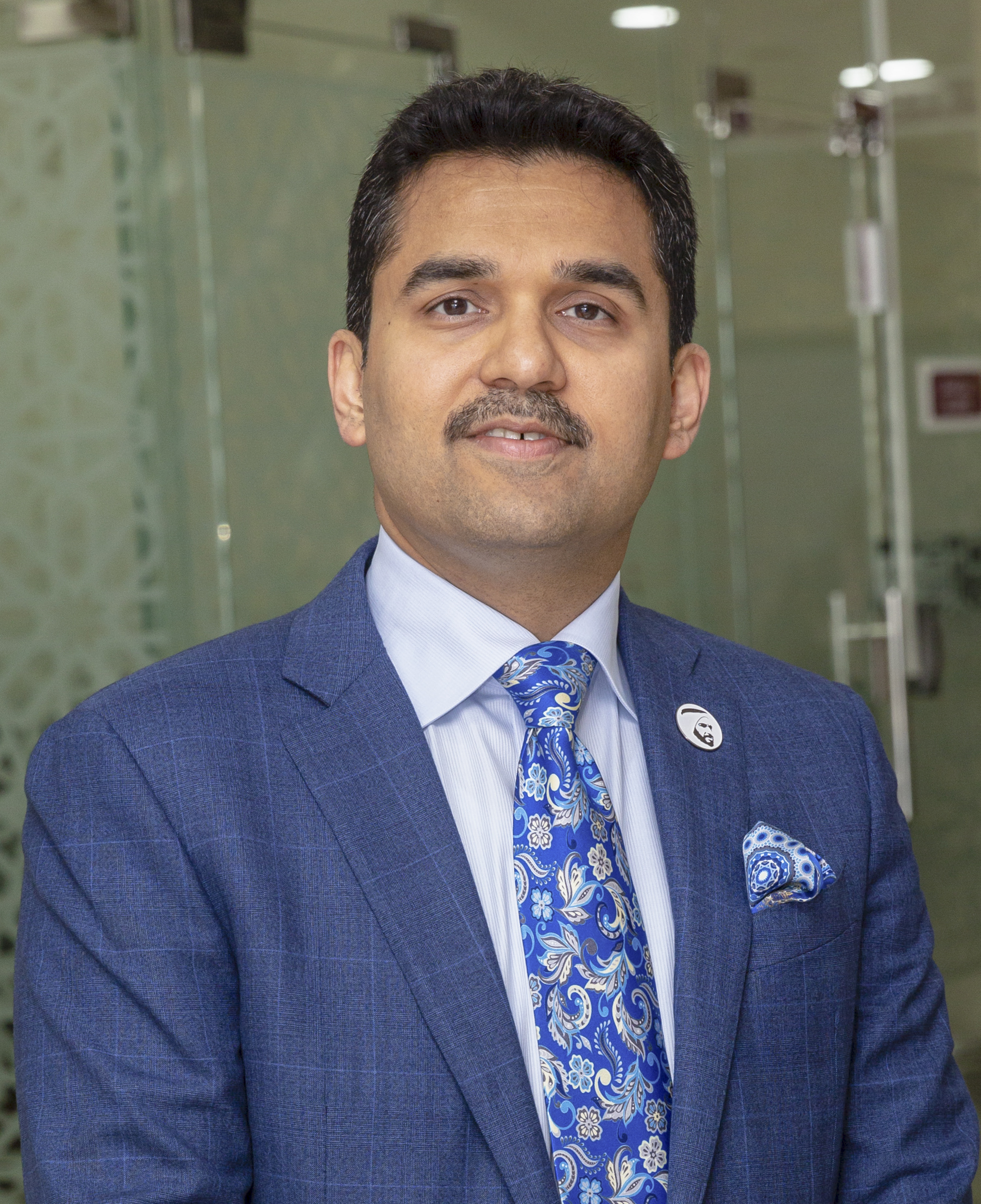
- Born: 11 January 1977 (age 49); Kozhikode, Kerala, India
- Education: Kasturba Medical College, Mangalore (MBBS); Sri Ramachandra Medical College and Research Institute (MD)
- Occupations: business tycoon, radiologist
- Known for: Founder, VPS Healthcare
- Spouse: Shabeena Ali
- Children: 4
- Relatives: M. A. Yusuff Ali (father-in-law)
- Awards: Pravasi Bharatiya Samman (2014)
- Website: drshamsheer.com

Shamsheer Vayalil Parambath (born 11 January 1977) is an Indian radiologist and businessman based in UAE. He is the founder and chairman of Burjeel Holdings. As of April 2023, Vayalil has a net worth of US$2.4 billion.

== Early life ==
Vayalil was born on 11 January 1977 in Kozhikode, Kerala, India. His parents are Hashim Pokkinari and Mariyam Barakkool.

After his schooling, he pursued a MBBS at Kasturba Medical College, Manipal, then obtained his MD in radiology from Sri Ramachandra Medical College and Research Institute, Chennai.

== Career ==
Vayalil was a radiologist for 12 months at Sheikh Khalifa Medical City, Abu Dhabi, UAE. In 2007, he opened his first hospital – LLH Hospital in Abu Dhabi. Over the next twelve years, his company VPS Healthcare started 20 hospitals in three countries and now has over 23 medical centres and about 13,000 employees in the Middle East and Vayalil is a member of the UAE Medical Council. He was a member of the advisory committee of the University of Sharjah College of Medicine. He is on the board of directors of Kannur International Airport Ltd.

== Philanthropy ==
Vayalil contributed AED 5 million to the Emirates Red Crescent to join global relief efforts in supporting those affected by the devastating earthquakes that hit Turkey and Syria in 2023.

== Non-resident Indian voting rights ==
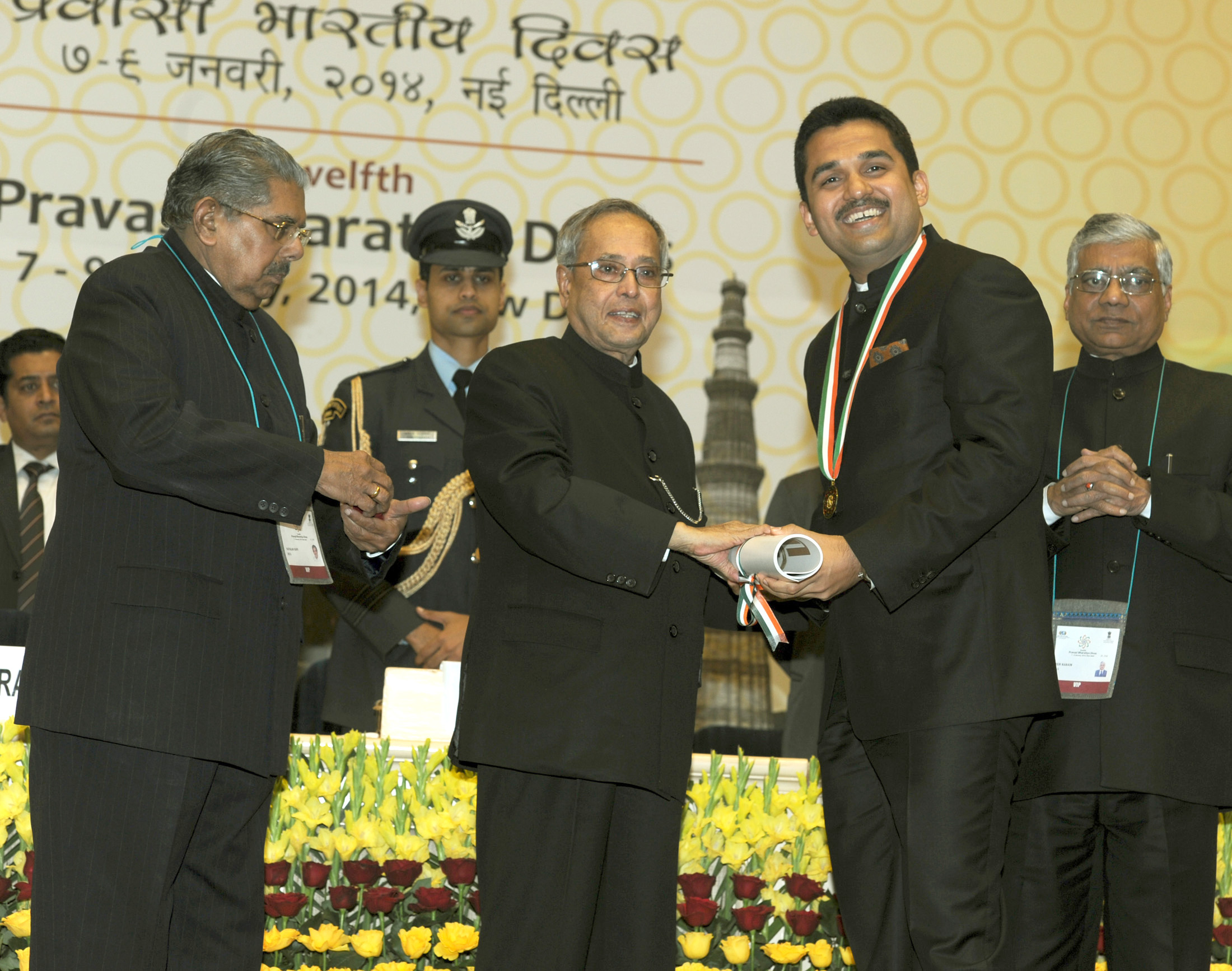
Shamsheer Vayalil receives Pravasi Bharatiya Samman

In April 2014, Vayalil filed a petition in the Supreme Court of India in connection with non-resident Indian (NRI) voting rights. Currently, voters have to travel to their constituency to vote. The Court directed the Election Commission of India to explore the possibility for NRIs to cast their vote from their place of residence. In October 2014, the commission submitted its report to the Court, recommending that NRIs be permitted to vote by proxy and e-postal ballot. On 9 August 2018, the Representation of the People (Amendment) Bill 2017, enabling the facility of proxy voting to overseas Indians, was passed by the Lok Sabha, and was awaiting introduction in the upper house of the Indian Parliament, the Rajya Sabha.

== Awards and accolades ==
- 2014 – Pravasi Bharatiya Samman for his role in developing a healthcare business in the United Arab Emirates and for promoting UAE-India ties
- 2014 – Received an honorary Doctorate (D.Litt. & DSE Honors Degree) from Aligarh Muslim University

== Personal life ==
Vayalil is married to Shabeena, the eldest daughter of fellow billionaire M. A. Yusuff Ali. They have four children.
