= Adnan Chilwan =

Indian banking business executive

- Occupation: Group CEO of Dubai Islamic Bank

Adnan Chilwan (Arabic: عدنان شلوان) is an Indian banking business executive, currently the CEO of Dubai Islamic Bank.

== Career ==
Chilwan spent most of his early career in management positions at a wide range of Islamic and conventional banks in the Gulf region, including HSBC, Dubai Bank, Abu Dhabi Islamic Bank, and Mashreq. He began work for Dubai Islamic Bank in 2008, first serving as the Chief of Retail Banking and later as the Deputy Chief Executive Officer. In 2010, he became a founding member of the board of directors for the Sharia-compliant Emirates Real Estate Investment Trust, a joint venture between Dubai Islamic Bank and Eiffel Management.

Chilwan was appointed as chief executive of Dubai Islamic Bank in July 2013. By November 2013, the bank's net profit was up 33.5% compared to the previous nine-month period. By 2014, the bank had 1.4 million customers and 86 branches across the UAE.

As GCEO, Chilwan indicated that his long-term goal is for the international operations of the bank to compose about 10 to 15% of the total revenue. He helped develop the SME Business Solutions Initiative, a Sharia-compliant line of financial products and services for SMEs.
