= Lulu Mall, Kochi =

LuLu Mall Kochi
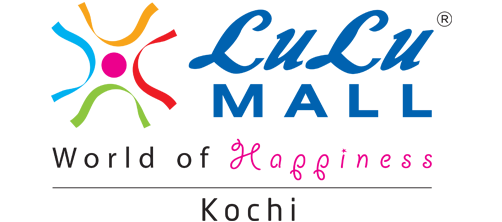

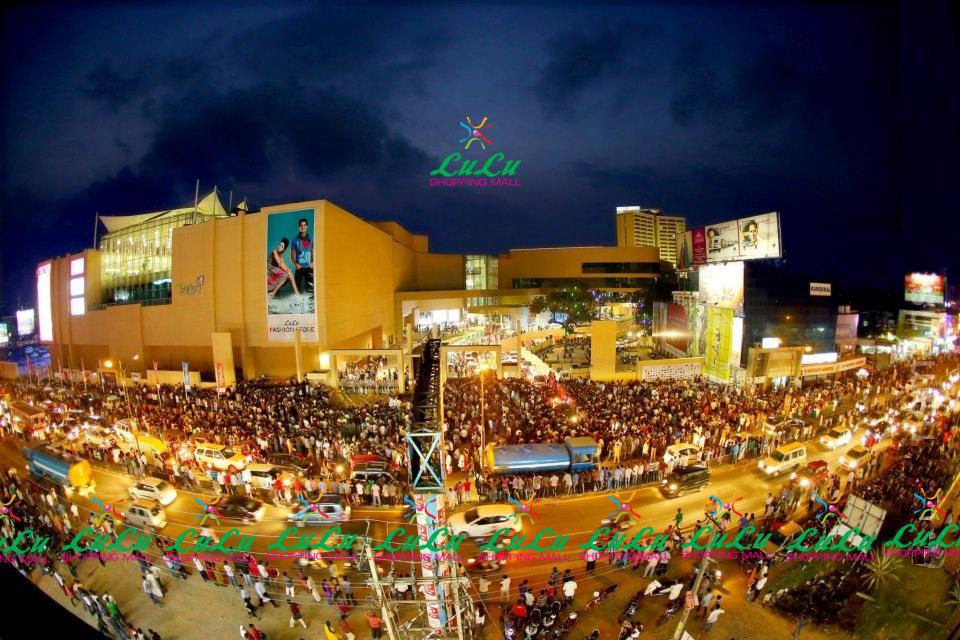
- Location: Edapally, Kochi, India
- Coordinates: 10°1′32″N 76°18′28″E
- Address: 34/1000, Old NH 47, Edapally, Kochi - 682 024
- Opened: 10 March 2013; 13 years ago
- Owner: LuLu Group International
- Architect: Atkins
- Num. of stores: 300+
- Num. of anchor tenants: 6
- Floor area: 185,806.08 m^{2} (2,000,000.0 sq ft)
- Floors: LG + G + 3
- Public transit: Edapally metro station
- Website: Official website

LuLu Mall, Kochi is a shopping mall located in Kochi, Kerala. Located at Edappally, it is the second the largest mall in Kerala with a total built up area of 2 million sq.ft. At the time of opening, it was the largest mall in India. It contains more than 300 outlets, including food courts, restaurants, family entertainment zones, a multiplex, ice skating rink, gaming arena, beauty parlors, toy train ride and bowling alley. The mall was opened in March 2013 by then Chief Minister of Kerala, Oommen Chandy.

The entire project, consisting of the shopping mall with four customized shopping levels and Kochi Marriot Hotel, was designed by the UK based architectural firm Atkins. The construction contract of the project was awarded to Shapoorji Pallonji, an Indian conglomerate. The 5-star business hotel located within the campus of the mall is operated by Marriott Hotels & Resorts.

By 2023, ten years from the opening, LuLu Mall Kochi had been visited by 250 million people and 3 million vehicles.

The estimated cost for this project was more than ₹1,600 crore (US$273.05 million). The property is owned and managed by Abu Dhabi based LuLu Group International. The shops and restaurants in LuLu Mall are franchised via Lulu Group's own retail operations company called Tablez. The head office building of the Lulu Group in India is located adjacent to the mall and hotel campus.

== Location ==
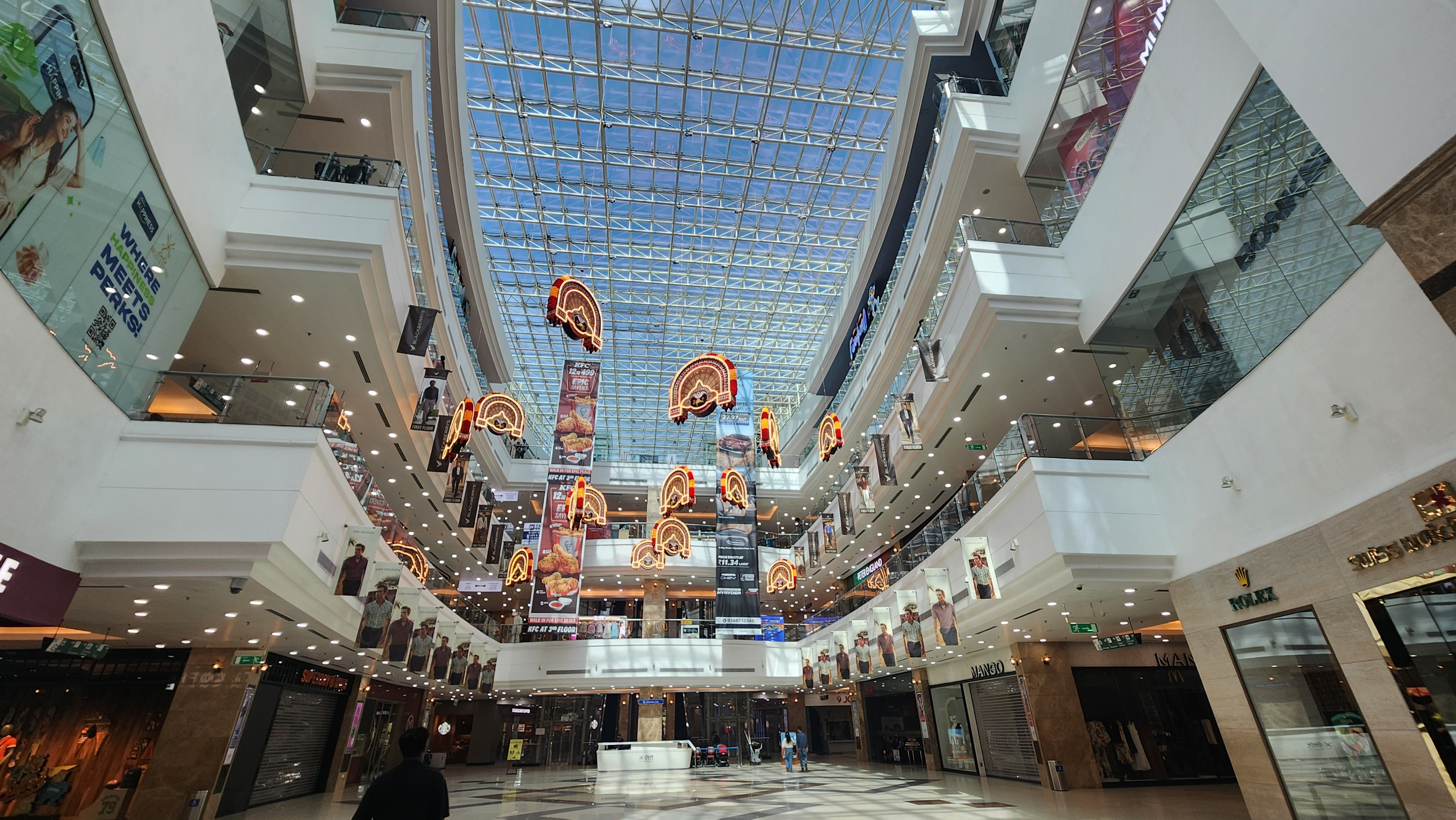
Central atrium of LuLu Mall with translucent roof

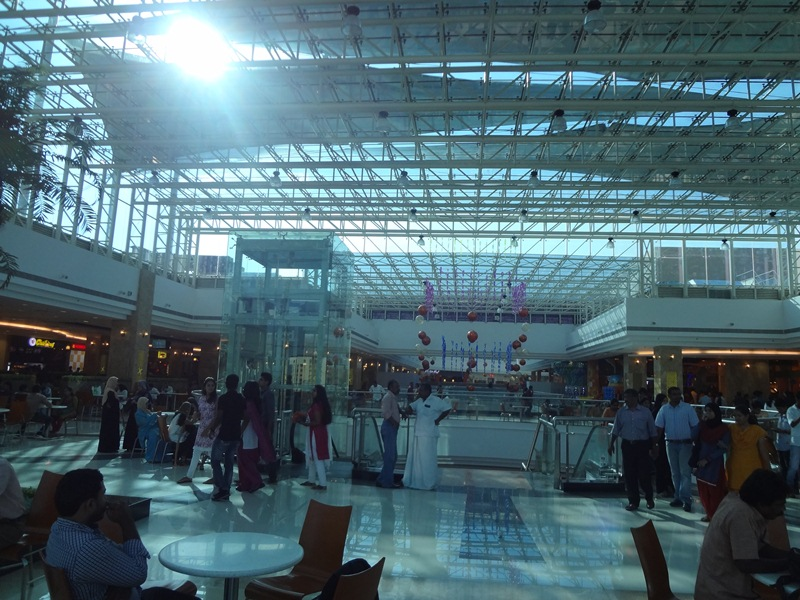
Food court area

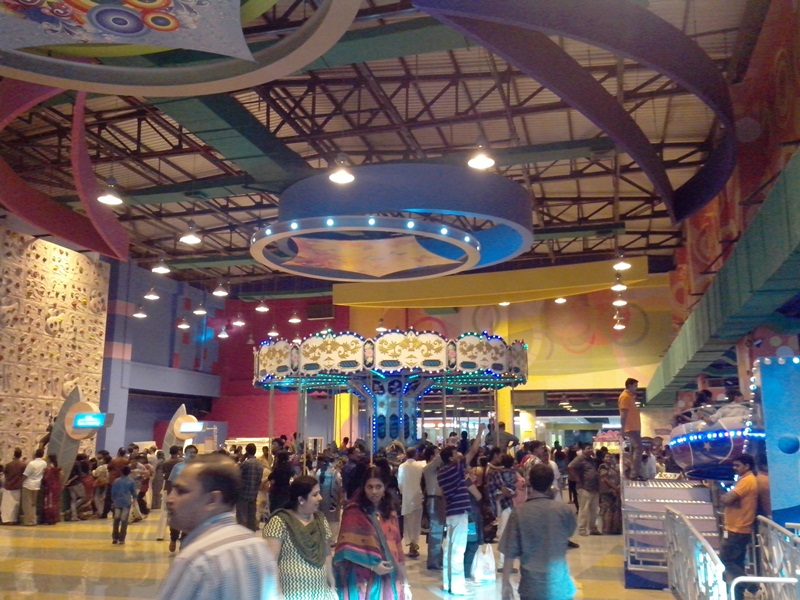
Amusement area

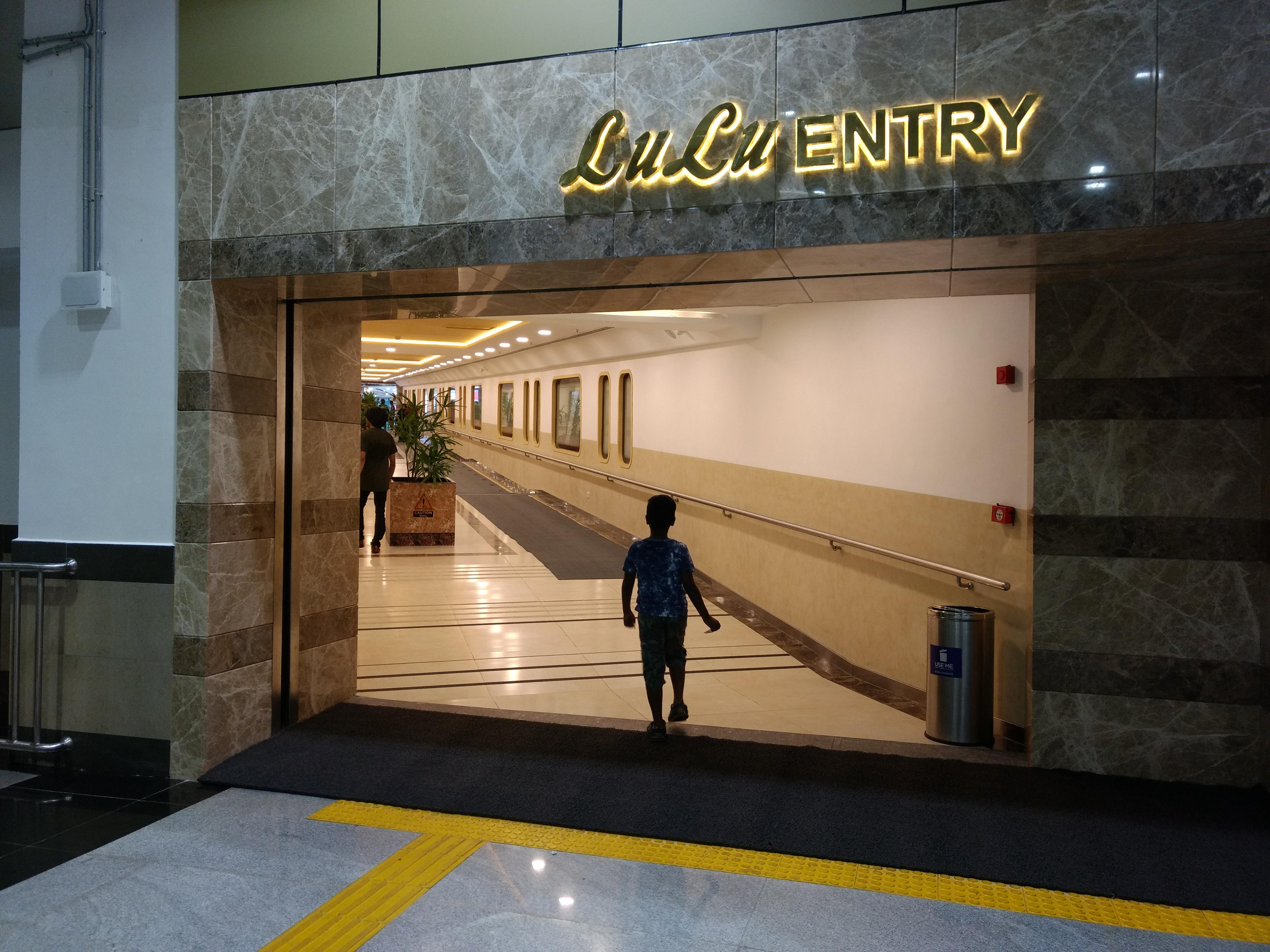
Skywalk entrance to the mall from Edapally metro station

LuLu Mall is at Edappally Junction, in the city of Kochi, at the junction of two national highways, NH 544 (previously known as NH 47) and NH 66 (previously known as NH 17).

== Transport ==
- A direct walkway connects the mall with the Edapally station of Kochi metro.
- All city transport buses have a stopover at nearest Edapally bus stop.
- Vyttila Mobility Hub, 8 km (5.0 mi) south
- Ernakulam Town railway station, 6.6 km (4.1 mi) South
- Ernakulam Junction railway station, 9 km (5.6 mi) south
- Aluva railway station, 11 km (6.8 mi) north
- Cochin International Airport, 23 km (14 mi) north

== Features and facilities ==
- Funtura Leisure zone which includes VR zone, 5D cinema, amusement arcade, rides, party hall, 12-lane bowling alley, and climbing wall
- 5,000 sq ft (460 m^{2}) ice skating rink (South India's largest)
- 71,000 square feet (6,600 m^{2}), nine screen PVR Cinemas multiplex with gold class and 4DX screens
- LuLu Hypermarket, on the ground floor, one of the largest hypermarkets in the country
- Other anchor stores such as Lulu Fashion Store, Lulu Connect, Lulu Celebrate, Marks & Spencer and Westside
- Adjacent to the mall is Kochi Marriott. The 273 room, 5-star hotel stands at a height of 84 meters and has a helipad.
- 2,500-seater food court with 22 multi-cuisine kitchens and five restaurants
- Parking space that can accommodate 3000 cars
- Money exchange centres
- Large glass central atrium with translucent roof
- Skywalk connecting the mall with the Edapally station of Kochi metro
- A toy train that takes children across the mall floor

== See also ==
- Lulu Mall, Thiruvananthapuram
- Kochi Marriot Hotel
- Oberon Mall
- Centre Square Mall, Kochi
- Gold Souk Grande, Kochi
- Abad Nucleus Mall
- Forum Mall Kochi
