= LuLu Group International =

Emirati multinational conglomerate

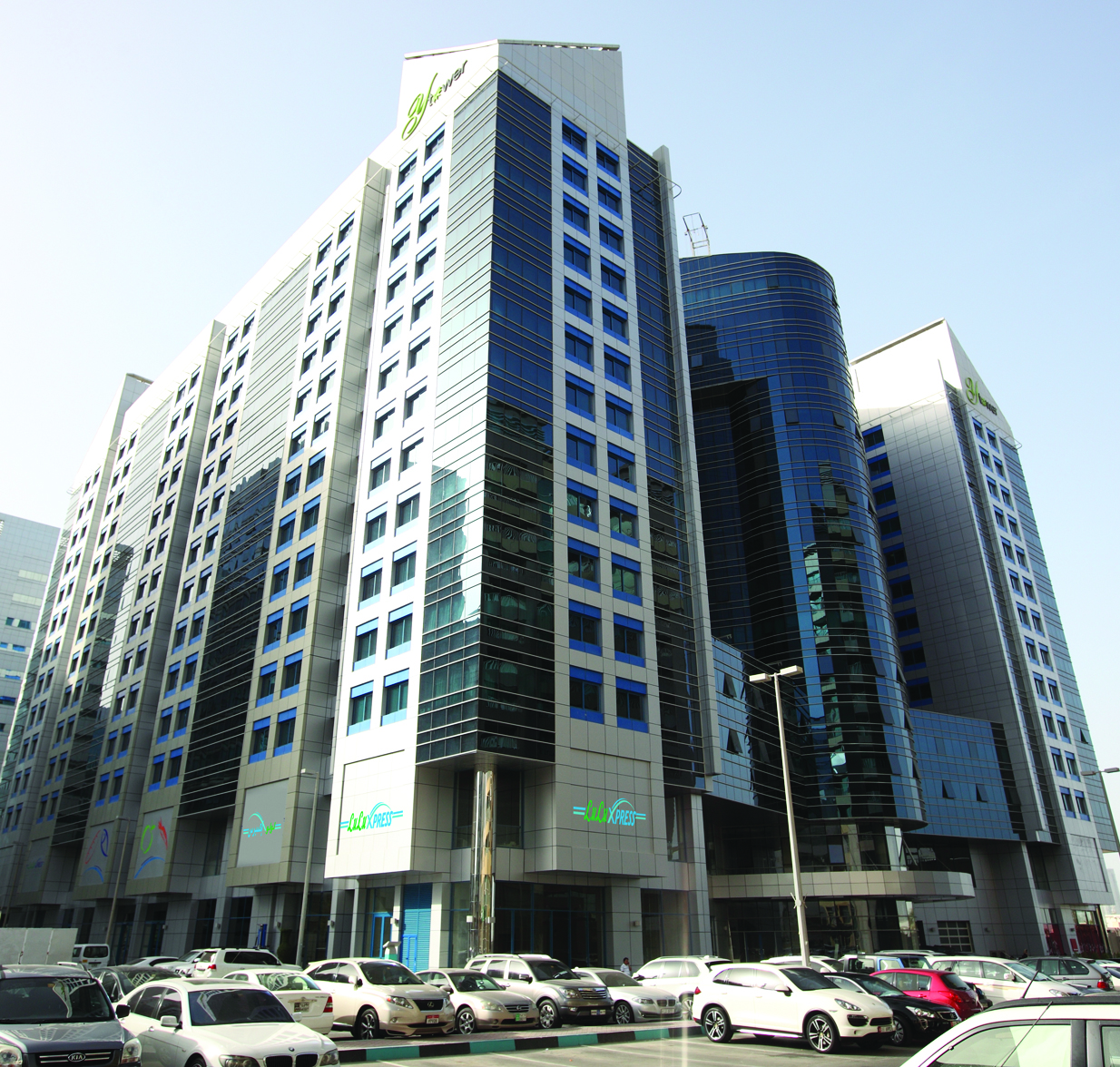
- Headquarters in Abu Dhabi
- Type: Private
- Industry: Conglomerate
- Founded: 1980; 46 years ago
- Founder: M. A. Yusuff Ali
- Headquarters: Abu Dhabi, United Arab Emirates
- Number of locations: 239 stores
- Area served: Asia (including the GCC and MENA); Africa; Europe; United States
- Key people: M. A. Yusuff Ali (Founder & Managing Director)
- Number of employees: 65,000
- Subsidiaries: LOT The Value Shop
- Website: lulugroupinternational.com

LuLu Group International is an Indian-Emirati multinational conglomerate company that operates a chain of hypermarkets and retail companies, headquartered in Abu Dhabi, United Arab Emirates. LuLu Group India Headquarters is located in Kochi, India It was founded in 1980 by M. A. Yusuff Ali from Nattika in Kerala, India. The group mainly operates LuLu Hypermarket, a chain of hypermarkets that ranks among the top grocers in many of the markets it operates in. LuLu has over 65,000 employees of various nationalities.

It is one of the largest retail chains in Asia and is the biggest in the Middle East with 259 outlets in the Gulf Cooperation Council (GCC) countries and elsewhere. In addition to LuLu Hypermarket, the group operates 13 malls in the GCC, and five malls in India. The group is among the world's 50 fastest growing retailers. The group also owns the Lulu Convention Centre in Thrissur and the Lulu Bolgatty International Convention Centre in Mulavukad Island, which is one of the largest convention centres in South Asia. In 2014 the group acquired a 10-percent stake in the UK-based trading firm, East India Company, and a 40-percent stake in its fine foods subsidiary for around $85 million in total. Y International is the export distribution center in the United States and Europe for LuLu Group International.

== History ==
LuLu Group International opened its first supermarket in Abu Dhabi, United Arab Emirates, in 1995, when the retail business scenario in the region started to change with the entry of Continent (now Carrefour). Later, LuLu supermarkets expanded its operations in Abu Dhabi and opened several Lulu stores in the emirate of Dubai. In the late 1990s, the LuLu Center department stores were launched, and the group expanded to other countries in the Middle East.

In 2000, the first Lulu Hypermarket store was opened in Dubai. With this launch, the group embarked on an aggressive expansion plan. It soon grew into a chain with several outlets across the UAE, Kuwait, Qatar, Saudi Arabia, Bahrain, Oman, and Yemen. On March 10, 2013, the first LuLu mall in India was opened in Kochi which was the largest mall in the country during that time. The group opened its largest mall, Lulu Mall in Thiruvananthapuram in December 2021, which was inaugurated by the Chief Minister of Kerala Pinarayi Vijayan along with other personalities.

In 2025, LuLu launched many "LOT The Value Shop" stores in many locations in Middle East, these stores focused on affordable products.

== Operations ==
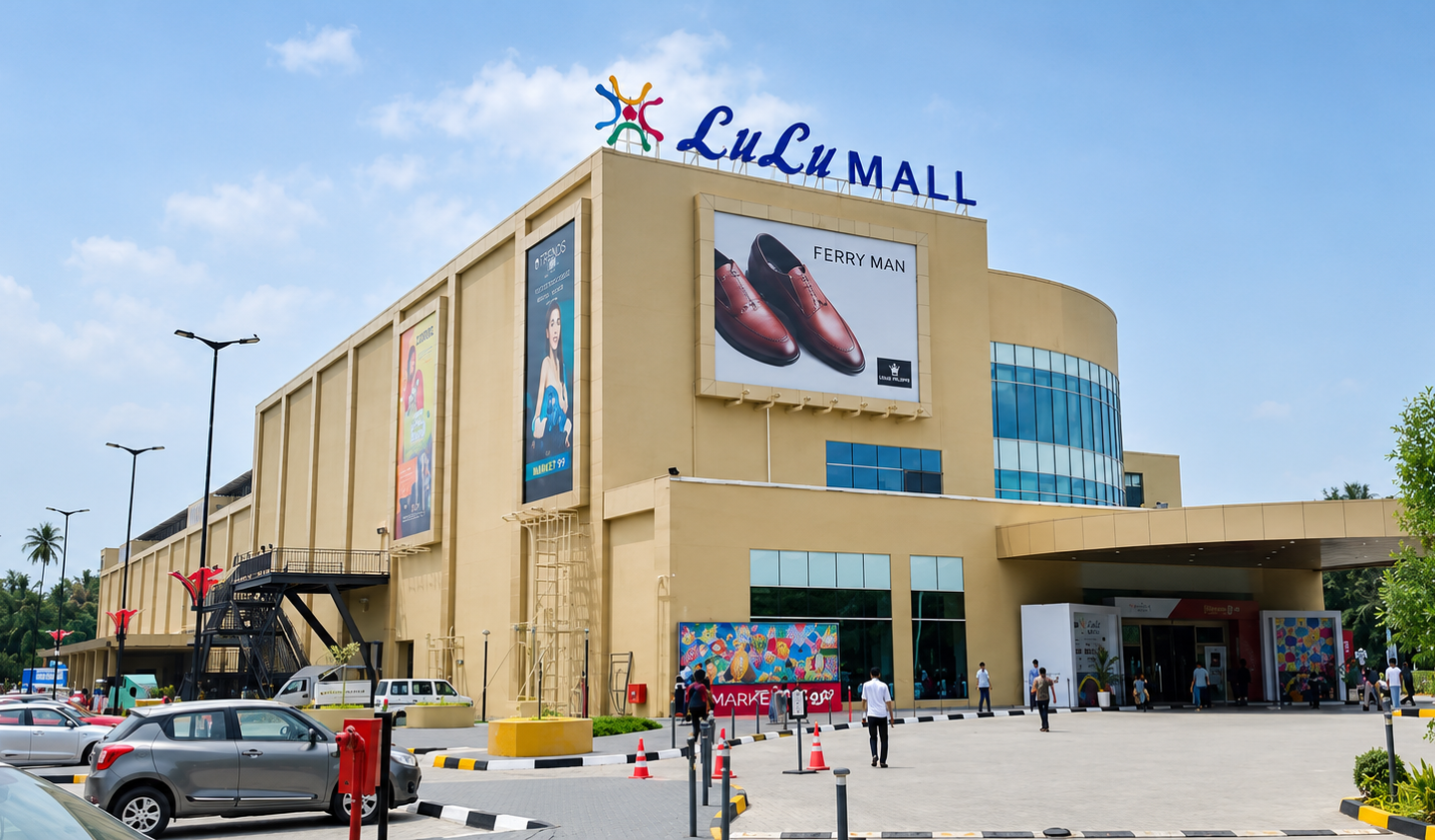
Lulu Mall, Kozhikode

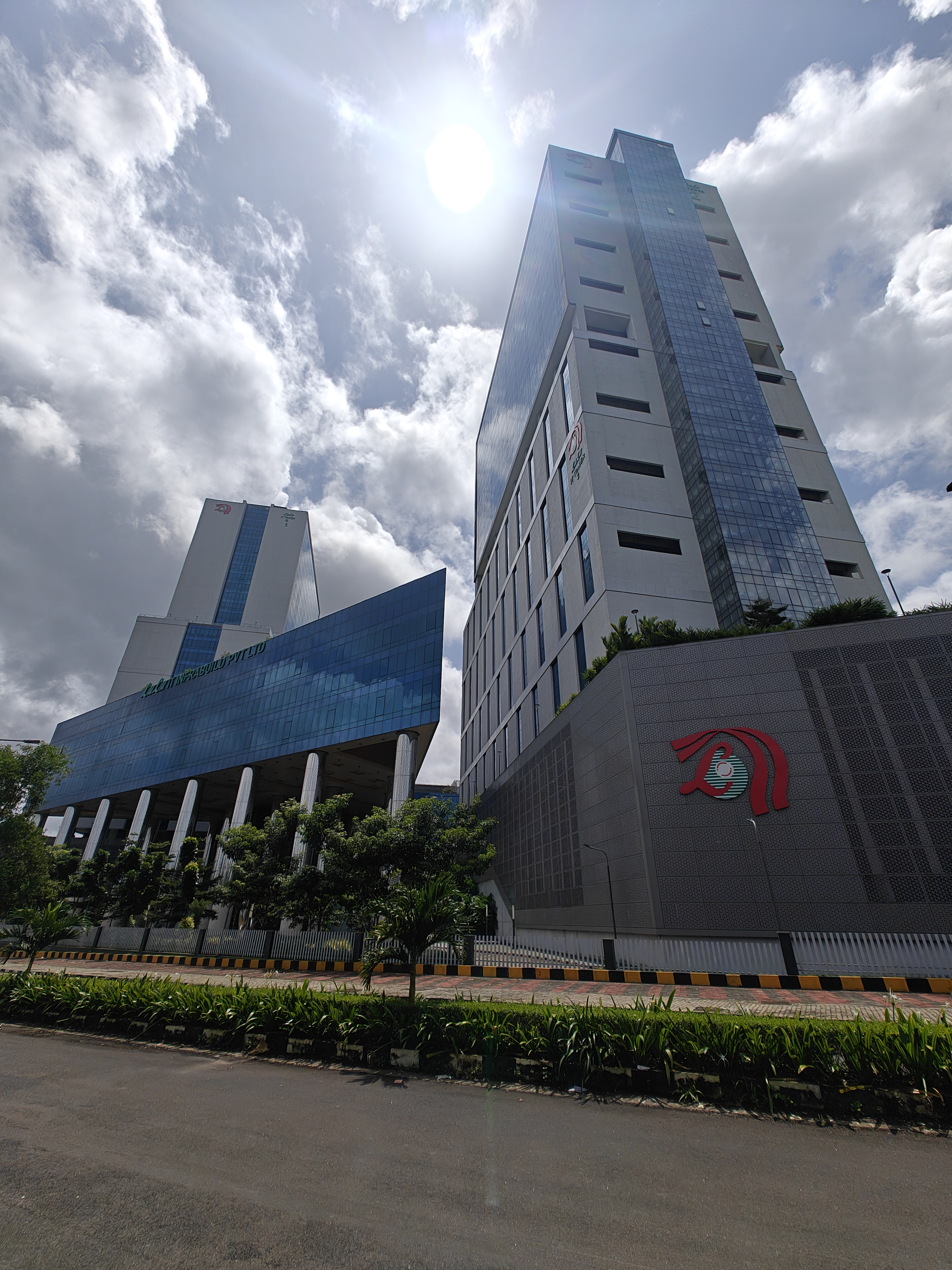
Lulu IT Twin Towers in Kochi, India

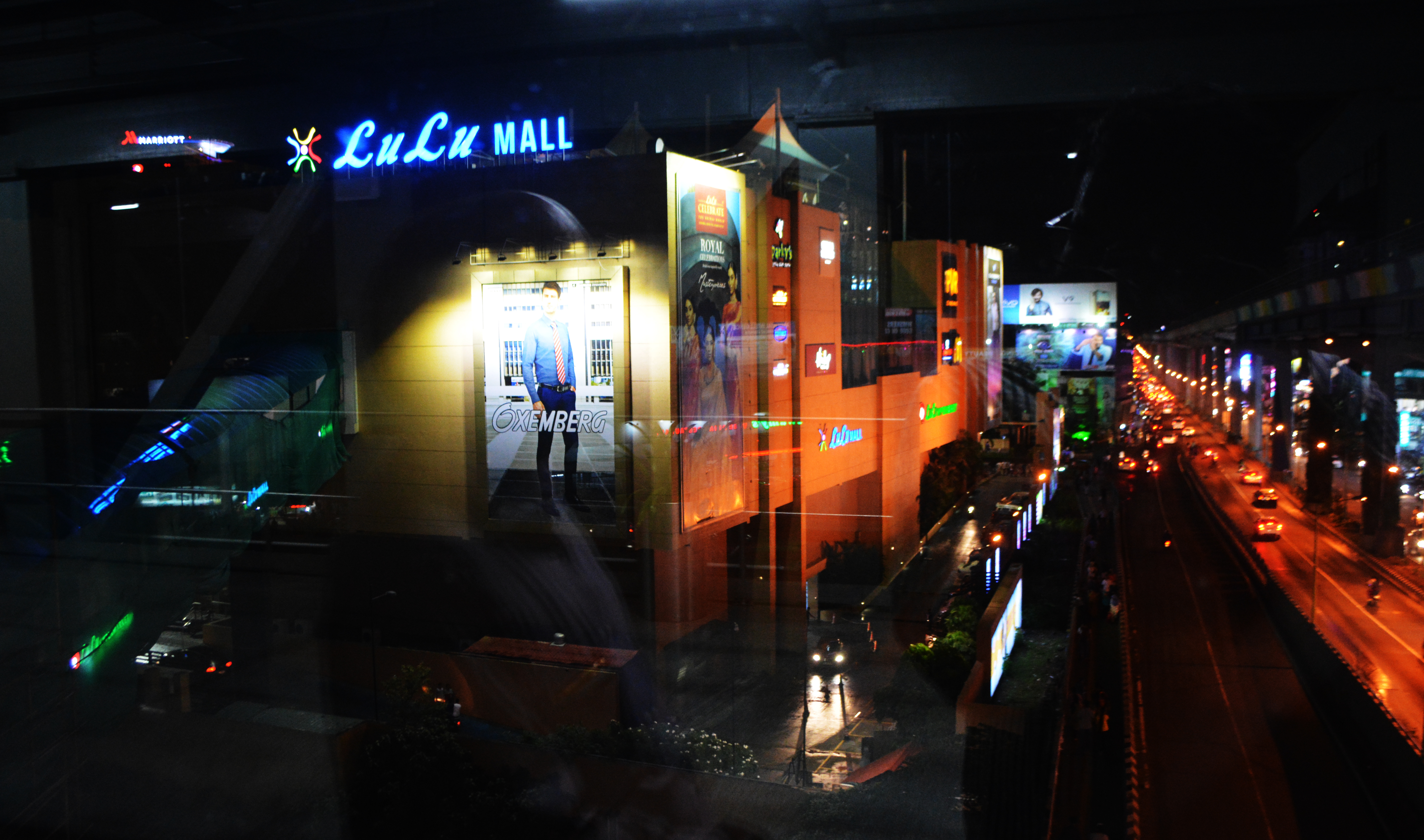
Lulu Mall view from Edapally Metro station at Kochi, Kerala, India at night

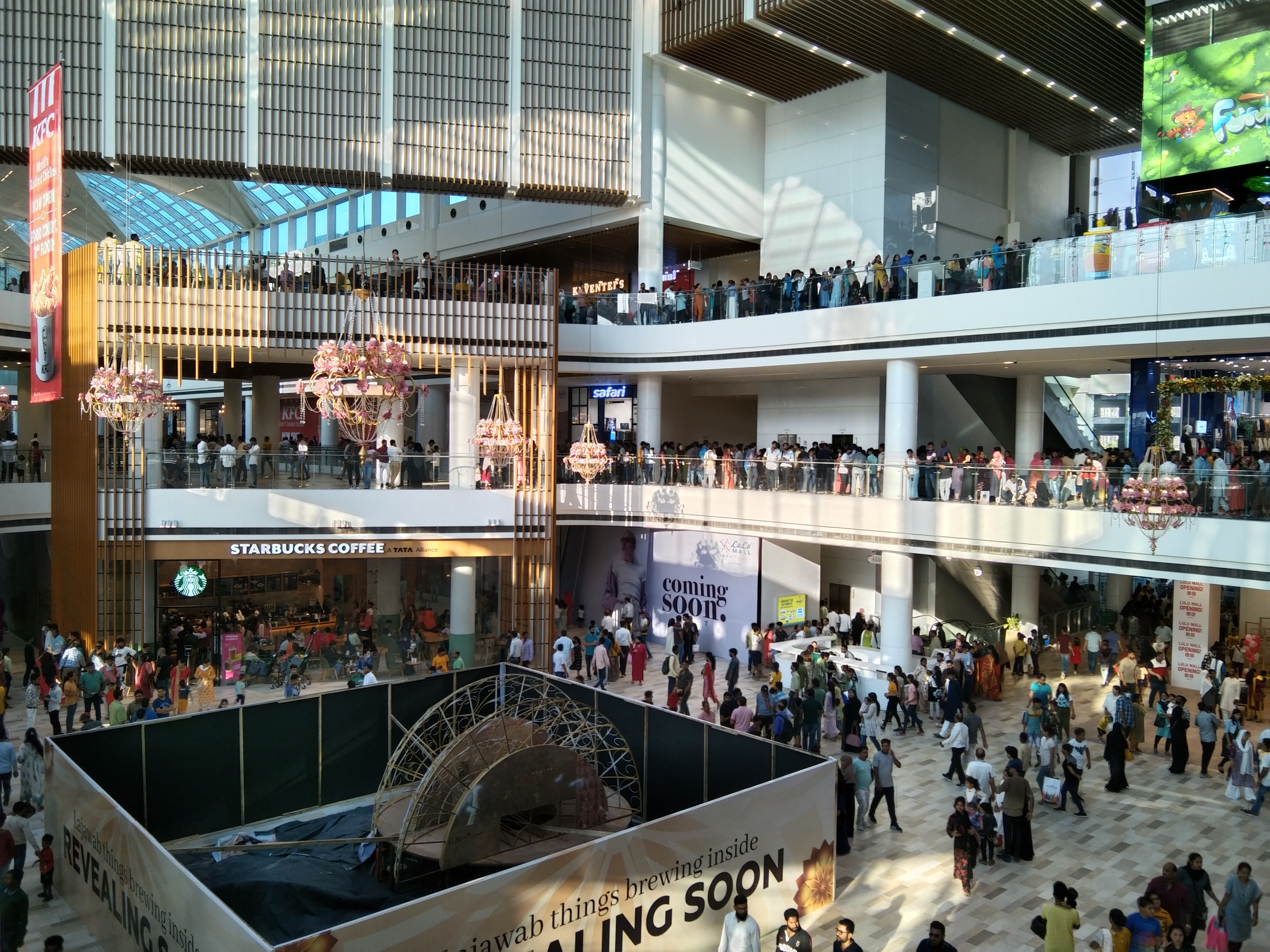
Lulu Mall, Lucknow inside view

=== Middle East and India ===
As of September 2024, there are more than 200 LuLu Hypermarkets in the GCC, 7 in India at Kochi, Bengaluru, Lucknow, Coimbatore, Thiruvananthapuram, Palakkad, Kottayam Hyderabad and Kozhikode, 4 in Malaysia and 4 in Indonesia. Lulu group has 6 other operations in India, the LuLu IT Parks in Kochi(which comprise of Lulu Cyber Tower 1 and Lulu Cyber Tower 2 in Infopark Phase 1 and Lulu IT Twin Towers in Smart City), LuLu fashion center in Thrissur, 2 Marriott hotels and resorts in Kochi, including Kochi Marriot Hotel, two LuLu International Convention Centre in Thrissur and Kochi, Grand Hyatt Hotel Kochi and two Hyatt Regency hotels in Thiruvananthapuram and Thrissur. Lulu group is heavily investing in Bengaluru, Chennai, Bhubaneswar, Hyderabad, Lucknow, Kozhikode and Kollam.

The group opened the doors of their newly constructed mall in Kozhikode on 9 September 2024. It features the largest Lulu hypermarket with an area of 1.5 lakh sq ft along with LuLu Fashion Store, LuLu Connect and Funtura. The group is also planning to construct a second mall in Kozhikode which would have a larger area compared to the present mall and would feature cinemas and many more international brands. The group owns hypermarkets in Kollam, Thrissur, Kottayam, Palakkad and Kozhikode in addition with Kochi The group has started construction of their new hypermarkets in Kottayam, Tirur, Ahmedabad, Chennai and Varanasi. The group also have plans to construct malls in Prayagraj, Madhya Pradesh, Rajasthan, Delhi, Mumbai, Nagpur, Pune, Visakhapatnam and a hypermarket in Perinthalmanna. The LuLu group is also setting up a food processing unit in Greater Noida.

=== International ===
In April 2013, LuLu Group launched operations in Birmingham with the inauguration of logistics and packaging facility under the name, Y International. The facility procures and exports food, non-food, chilled and frozen products of British origin for sale in LuLu Hypermarkets. Date coding and labelling for different countries, translation of labels, Halal and other relevant certifications are also carried out. Y International employs 60 employees and aims to create 200 jobs. In May 2014, following the visit of then Prime Minister of Malaysia Najib Razak to UAE, a memorandum of understanding between Lulu Hypermarket and the Federal Land Development Authority of Malaysia was signed for the establishment of ten Lulu Hypermarkets in Malaysia.

=== Locations ===
Country	First store	Number of stores
United Arab Emirates	2000	175
India	2013	12
Oman	2005	35
Bahrain	2007	11
Saudi Arabia	2009	34
Kuwait	2007	6
Qatar	2000	22
Egypt	2010	3
Yemen	2006	1
Indonesia	2016	2
Suriname	2016	1
Malaysia	2016	-

== Ownership ==
Lulu Hypermarket is owned by LuLu Group International. LuLu Group International also owns Twenty14 Holdings, which owns hotels across the world.

In 2024 LuLu group experienced a major data breach exposing over 200,000 customer records. The attack was claimed by IntelBroker and included personal details such as email addresses and phone numbers. The full database which has not been leaked yet, allegedly contained millions of user and order details.

== See also ==
- List of hypermarkets
- List of supermarket chains in the United Arab Emirates
- Lulu Mall
- Abu Dhabi Developmental Holding Company (ADQ)
