= Apostolic Vicariate of Northern Arabia =

Catholic missionary jurisdiction

Apostolic Vicariate of Northern Arabia Apostolicus Vicariatus Arabiae Septentrionalis النيابة الرسولية العربية الشمالية
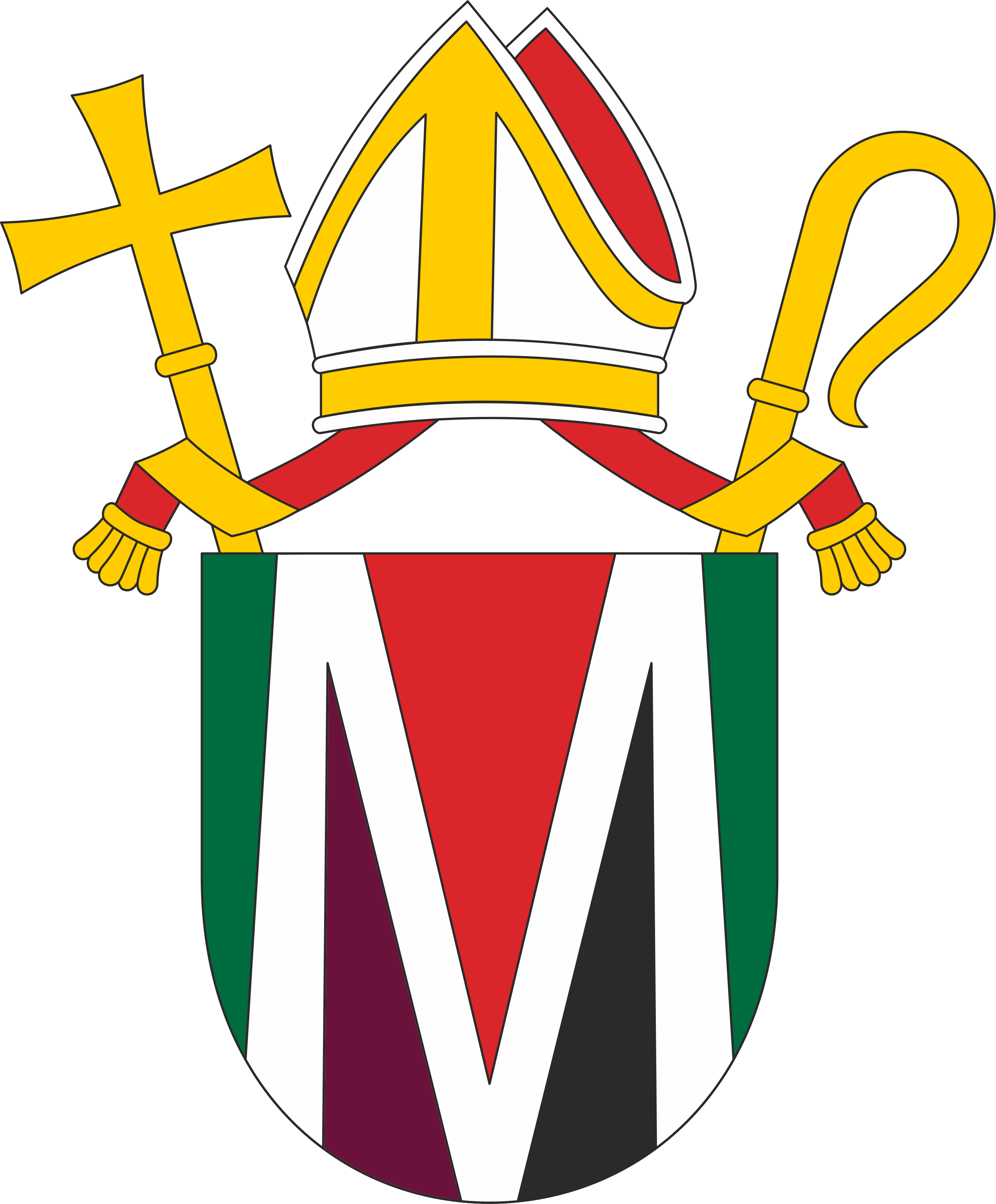

Location
- Country: Kuwait; Bahrain; Qatar; Saudi Arabia

Statistics
- Area: 2,179,846 km^{2} (841,643 sq mi)
- Population: Total; Catholics: (as of 2020); 43,463,583; 2,722,000 (6.3%)
- Churches: 11

Information
- Denomination: Catholic
- Sui iuris church: Latin Church
- Rite: Roman Rite, Maronite, Syro-Malabar, Syro-Malankara, Coptic Catholic
- Established: 29 June 1953 (As Prefecture Apostolic of Kuwait); 2 December 1954 (As Apostolic Vicariate of Kuwait); 31 May 2011 (As Apostolic Vicariate of Northern Arabia)
- Cathedral: Cathedral of Our Lady of Arabia, Bahrain
- Co-cathedral: Holy Family Co-Cathedral, Kuwait
- Patroness: Our Lady of Arabia
- Secular priests: 54

Current leadership
- Pope: Leo XIV
- Apostolic Vicar: Aldo Berardi OSsT

Map
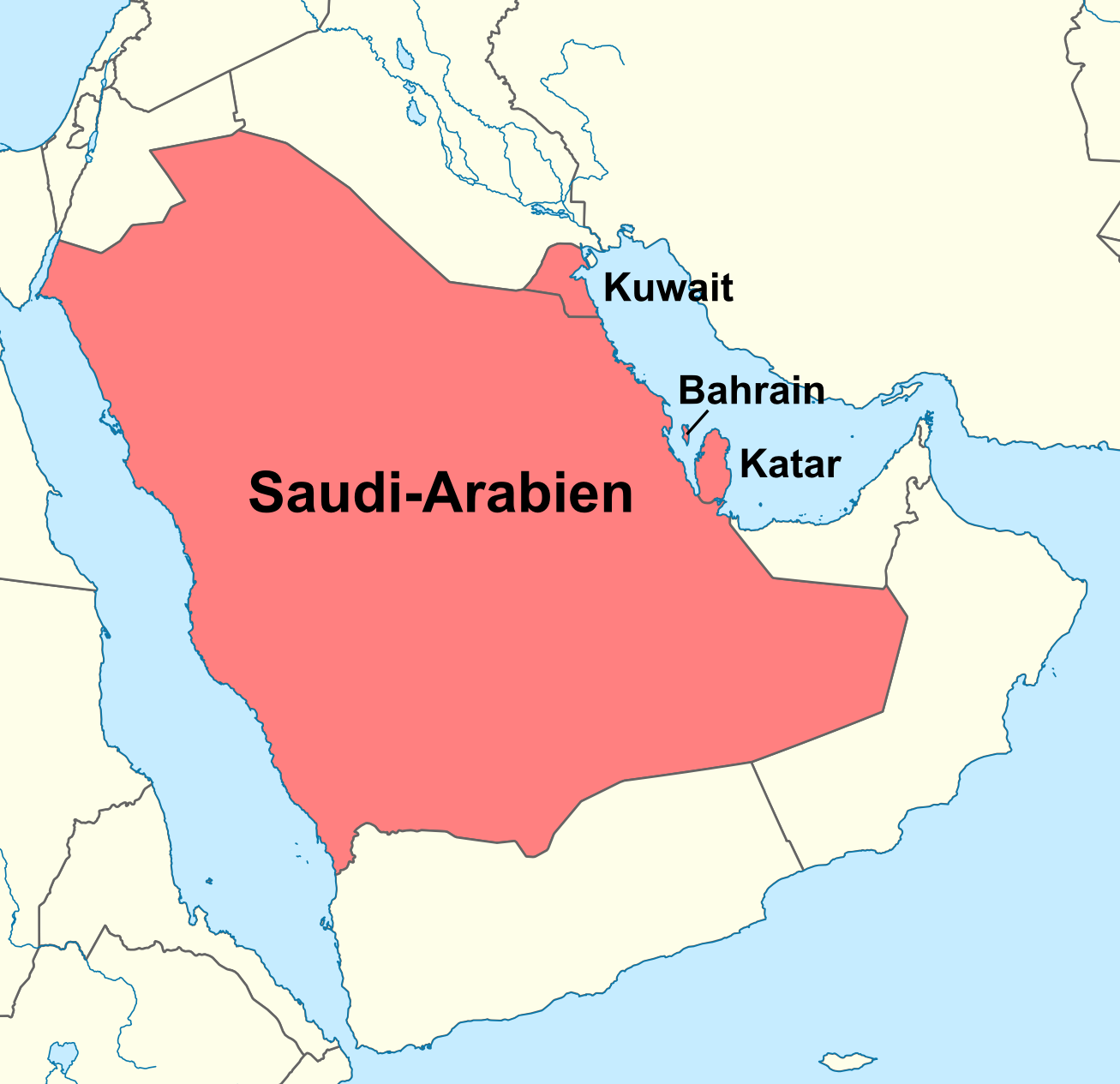

Website
- Website of the Apostolic Vicariate

Apostolic Vicar of Northern Arabia

Catholic
- Incumbent: Aldo Berardi, OSsT; Ordained on 18 March 2023

Information
- First holder: Camillo Ballin MCCJ
- Established: 2011
- Cathedral: Cathedral of Our Lady of Arabia, Bahrain
- Co-cathedral: Holy Family Co-Cathedral, Kuwait

The Apostolic Vicariate of Northern Arabia (Latin: Vicariatus Apostolicus Arabiæ Septentrionalis) (Arabic: النيابة الرسولية العربية الشمالية) is an apostolic vicariate of the Catholic Church with territorial jurisdiction for Bahrain, Kuwait, Qatar, and Saudi Arabia. The vicar apostolic of the vicariate is Bishop Aldo Berardi OSsT. It was first established in 1953 (as the Apostolic Prefecture of Kuwait) and took its current name in 2011.

The apostolic vicariate is led by a vicar apostolic, who is usually a titular bishop. While such a territory can be classed as a particular Church, according to canon 371.1 of the Latin Code of Canon Law, a vicar apostolic's jurisdiction is an exercise of the jurisdiction of the Pope – the territory comes directly under the Pope as "local bishop", and the vicariate come directly under the jurisdiction of the Diocese of Rome, where the pope exercises this authority through a "vicar". This is unlike the jurisdiction of a diocesan bishop, whose jurisdiction derives directly from his office.

The see of the apostolic vicar is in the Cathedral of Our Lady of Arabia in Awali, Bahrain, with a co-cathedral, the Holy Family Co-Cathedral, located in Kuwait City which was the former seat of the vicariate.

== Statistics ==
The vicariate serves the peninsular Arabian countries of Bahrain, Kuwait, Qatar, and Saudi Arabia, but there are no churches on Saudi territory. As of 2020, it serves a Catholic population of 2,722,000, which is approximately 6.3% of the total population of the region (43,463,583).

The vicariate comprises 11 parishes and has 54 priests, including 11 diocesan and 43 religious priests. Additionally, there are 1 deacon, 44 brothers, 18 sisters, 1 seminarian, and 61 lay religious who support the vicariate.

== History ==
The apostolic vicariate was established as the Apostolic Prefecture of Kuwait in June 1953, on territory split off from the then Apostolic Vicariate of Arabia. It was promoted on 2 December 1954, as the Apostolic Vicariate of Kuwait, entitled to a titular bishop. It was renamed the Apostolic Vicariate of Northern Arabia on 31 May 2011, having gained additional territory from the Apostolic Vicariate of Arabia, which was renamed the Apostolic Vicariate of Southern Arabia.

In January 2011, Pope Benedict XVI through the Congregation for Divine Worship and the Discipline of the Sacraments declared the Blessed Virgin Mary under the title Our Lady of Arabia patroness of the Northern Vicariate (feast on the 2nd Sunday of Ordinary Time).

In August 2012, the headquarters of the vicariate was transferred from Kuwait to Bahrain, which is in the centre of the vicariate since it had a more permissive visa policy.

== Leadership ==
Apostolic Prefect of Kuwait

- Ubaldo Teofano Stella, OCD (29 June 1953 – 2 December 1954)

Apostolic Vicars of Kuwait

1. Ubaldo Teofano Stella, OCD (2 December 1954 – March 1966)
2. Victor León Esteban San Miguel y Erce, OCD – (as Apostolic Administrator), (17 March 1966 – 31 May 1976)
3. Victor León Esteban San Miguel y Erce, OCD (31 May 1976 – 5 November 1981)
4. Francis George Adeodatus Micallef, OCD (5 November 1981 – 14 July 2005)
5. Camillo Ballin, MCCI (14 July 2005 – 31 May 2011)

Apostolic Vicars of Northern Arabia

1. Camillo Ballin, MCCI (31 May 2011 – 12 April 2020)
2. Paul Hinder, OFMCap – (as Apostolic Administrator), (13 May 2020 – 18 March 2023)
3. Aldo Berardi, OSsT (18 March 2023 – present)

== Parishes ==
- Kuwait:
  - Holy Family Co – Cathedral in Kuwait City
  - St. Thérèse Parish in Salmiya
  - Our Lady of Arabia Parish in Ahmadi
  - St. Daniel Comboni Parish in Jleeb Al-Shuyoukh
- Bahrain:
  - Cathedral of Our Lady of Arabia in Awali
  - Sacred Heart Church in Manama
  - St. Aretha's Parish
  - Our Lady of Arabia Parish
  - Our Lady of Fatima Parish
  - St. Joseph Parish
- Qatar:
  - Church of Our Lady of the Rosary in Doha
  - St. Thomas Syro-Malabar Church in Doha

== See also ==
- Apostolic Vicariate of Southern Arabia
- List of Catholic dioceses in Northern Arabia
- Catholic Church in Bahrain
- Catholic Church in Kuwait
- Catholic Church in Saudi Arabia
- Catholic Church in Qatar
