= Minor Basilica of Our Lady of Arabia =

Church in Kuwait

Minor Basilica Our Lady of Arabia Basilicae Minoris Dominae Nostrae de Arabia
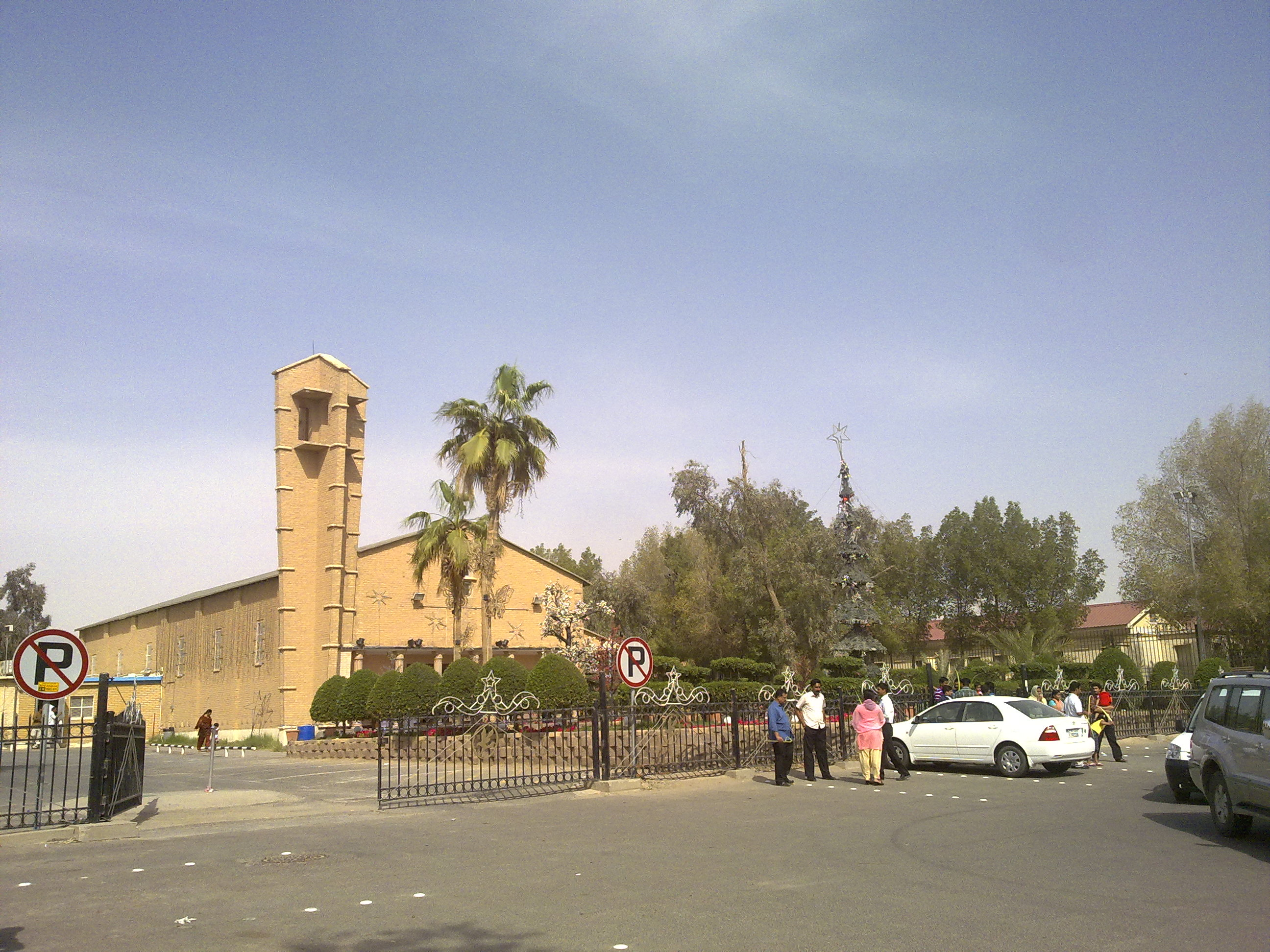
- Minor Basilica Our Lady of Arabia; Basilicae Minoris Dominae Nostrae de Arabia
- 29°05′31″N 48°04′03″E
- Location: Al Ahmadi, Kuwait
- Country: Kuwait
- Denomination: Catholic Church
- Sui iuris church: Latin Church

History
- Status: Minor basilica
- Founded: 1956

Administration
- Diocese: Apostolic Vicariate of Northern Arabia

Clergy
- Bishop: Aldo Berardi OSsT
- Rector: Fr. Darrel Priwon Fernandes OFM Cap.

The Minor Basilica of Our Lady of Arabia, formerly known as the Our Lady of Arabia Parish, is a Catholic minor basilica in Al Ahmadi, Kuwait. It is the oldest Catholic church in Kuwait and is widely regarded as the "mother church" of the Apostolic Vicariate of Northern Arabia. It was the first church in the Arabian Peninsula to be raised to the status of minor basilica, a distinction granted by Pope Leo XIV in July 2025.

== History ==
The site where the church sits on today was formerly a nissen hut that housed a power station, was converted to a temporary chapel and was blessed on 8 December 1948. Bishop Ubaldo Teofano Stella sought to build a permanent church for the growing Catholic community and with the help of the Kuwait Oil Company, permission was granted for a new stone church in central Al Ahmadi.

The cornerstone of the church, laid on 8 September 1955, was taken from the ruins of the medieval Church of the Assumption at Aylesford, Kent, linked to the Carmelite Order and earlier blessed by Pope Pius XII in 1952. It was the first Catholic church in Kuwait and has become known as the "mother church" of the Apostolic Vicariate of Northern Arabia.

The church was inaugurated on 1 April 1956 and was dedicated to the Blessed Virgin Mary under the title of Our Lady of Arabia, along with St. Elias the Prophet and St. Thérèse of Lisieux. It was raised to the status of minor basilica by Pope Leo XIV in July 2025. It is the first such church in the Arabian Peninsula.
