= Catholic Church by country =

Distribution of Catholics

The percentage of Catholics by country, 2010

The number of Catholics by country, 2010

The Catholic Church is "the Catholic Communion of Churches, both Roman and Eastern, or Oriental, that are in full communion with the Bishop of Rome (the pope)." This communion comprises the Latin Church (the Roman or Western Church) as well as 23 Eastern Catholic Churches, canonically called sui juris churches, each led by either a patriarch or a major archbishop in full communion with the pope. Historically, these bodies separated from Eastern Christian communions, either to remain in or to return to full communion with the Catholic Church. The Vatican II decree on Eastern Catholic Churches, however, explicitly recognizes them as churches and not just rites within the Catholic Church. For example, Greek Catholics follow the Byzantine Rite of the Greek Catholic Church, which falls within the Eastern Catholic Churches in communion with Rome. This communion "exists among and between the individual Churches and dioceses of the universal Catholic Church. Its structural expression is the College of Bishops, each of whom represents and embodies his own local church."

In addition to Eastern Catholic Churches, the Catholic Church oversees the Catholic Charismatic Renewal, the largest Charismatic movement of a single institution in 2020, with over 100 million members, primarily in the Global South. The Catholic Church is also described as an "amalgam of parts" (i.e., thousands of individual dioceses and religious orders) globally dispersed, but in communion with Rome.

The church is the largest non-government provider of education and health care in the world, while the diplomatic status of the Holy See facilitates access to its vast international network of charities. These entities include 5,000 hospitals, 10,000 orphanages, 95,000 elementary schools and 47,000 secondary schools.

== Methodology ==
Most of the figures are taken from the CIA's World Factbook or Pew Research Center surveys. In Latin American countries, Latinobarómetro is often cited. In Germany and other German-speaking regions of Europe, there are official membership statistics due to the fact that the government collects a church tax based on these membership lists. For this reason, statistics are not solely grounded on surveys based on self-identification. A baptismal certificate or other religious document is likewise secondary to church statistics. This method may explain the discrepancy between Pew's figures on Germany and the church figures.

According to The World Factbook and Pew, the five countries with the largest number of Catholics are, in decreasing order:

- Brazil
- Mexico
- Philippines
- United States
- Democratic Republic of the Congo

The country with the largest percentage of its population having membership in the church is Vatican City at 100%, followed by Timor-Leste at 97%.

According to the World Christian Database, there are 1.279 billion Catholics worldwide as of 2026, which constitute 47.8% of 2.674 billion Christians. According to the Census of the 2023 Annuario Pontificio ('Pontifical Yearbook'), the number of baptized Catholics in the world was about 1.376 billion at the end of 2021. The research initiative Catholics & Cultures compiles data on Catholic demographics, including from the Annuario Pontificio, by country.

== By country ==
By clicking on the arrow icons in the column headers, the following table can be re-ordered.

Catholic Church by country
Country	Total population	% Catholic	Catholic total
Afghanistan (details)	30,000,000	0%	0
Albania (details)	2,336,000	7.9%–8.39%	184,000–196,000
Algeria (details)	46,000,000	0%–0.02%	9,000
Andorra (details)	70,000	63.8%	61,740
Angola (details)	36,600,000	39.9%–44.2%	16,000,000
Antigua and Barbuda (details)	84,816	5.5%	4,752
Argentina (details)	47,300,000	58%–62.9%–63%	27,000,000–30,000,000
Armenia (details)	2,932,731	0.61%	17,884
Australia (details)	25,380,000	16%–20.0%	5,076,000
Austria (details)	9,255,000	48.7%	4,488,000
Azerbaijan (details)	9,400,000	0.01%–0.1%	570
Bahamas (details)	330,000	12%	39,600
Bahrain (details)	1,500,000	8.9%	80,000
Bangladesh (details)	158,000,000	0.07%	110,000
Barbados (details)	250,012	3.8%	10,000
Belarus (details)	9,500,000	5.2%–6%–7.1%–12%	674,500
Belgium (details)	11,800,000	31%–44%	3,600,000–5,200,000
Belize (details)	334,000	40%	133,600
Benin (details)	7,460,025	24.9%	1,858,000
Bhutan (details)	2,232,291	0.06%	1,339
Bolivia (details)	10,500,000	59.3%–63%	6,226,000–6,615,000
Bosnia and Herzegovina (details)	3,531,159	14.9%–15.2%	331,266–536,333
Botswana (details)	1,640,115	1.7%	28,000
Brazil (details)	203,080,000	46%–56.75%	100,200,000–115,250,000
Brunei (details)	450,000	5%	22,500
Bulgaria (details)	6,445,481	0.6%	38,709
Burkina Faso (details)	13,925,313	20.1%–21.1%	4,121,536
Burundi (details)	12,000,000	56.8%–58.6%–62%	7,000,000
Cambodia (details)	13,607,069	0.4%	54,000
Cameroon (details)	31,000,000	33.1%–33.6%	10,300,000
Canada (details)	42,000,000	21%–29.9%	8,500,000-12,600,000
Cape Verde (details)	512,096	69.9%–72.5%	395,850
Central African Republic (details)	3,799,897	28%	949,974
Chad (details)	12,000,000	18%–19.9%	2,520,000
Chile (details)	20,000,000	45%–46%–53.7% (15+)	9,000,000-10,700,000
China (details)	1,400,000,000	0.7%	6,000,000–12,000,000
Colombia (details)	52,000,000	39.4%–56.6%–60%–78.2%	20,000,000–40,000,000
Comoros (details)	800,000	0%–0.2%	1,600
Congo, Republic of the (details)	5,062,021	30.3%–32%–55%	1,620,000–2,780,000
Costa Rica (details)	5,100,000	47.5%–52%	2,400,000–2,650,000
Croatia (details)	3,872,000	79.4%–83.2%	3,240,000
Cuba (details)	11,163,934	51%–60%	6,000,000
Cyprus (details)	923,381	1.5%	13,860
Czech Republic (details)	10,524,167	9.36%	985,162
Democratic Republic of the Congo (details)	116,000,000	29.9%–47.3%	35,000,000–55,000,000
Denmark (details)	5,900,000	1%	58,000
Djibouti (details)	476,703	0.2%	953
Dominica (details)	71,540	52.7%–58.1%	41,564
Dominican Republic (details)	10,400,000	43%	4,992,000
Ecuador (details)	18,000,000	65%–68%	11,700,000–12,200,000
Equatorial Guinea (details)	1,620,000	88%	1,425,000
Egypt (details)	107,000,000	0%–0.2%	200,000
El Salvador (details)	7,000,000	40%–47%	2,730,000–3,500,000
Eritrea (details)	4,561,599	3.3%–<5%	150,532
Estonia (details)	1,114,030	0.8%	8,690
Eswatini (details)	1,100,000	2.4%–4.9%–20%	62,803
Ethiopia (details)	139,000,000	0.2%–0.5%	1,000,000
Fiji (details)	893,354	9.1%	80,401
Finland (details)	5,600,000	0.3%	16,734
France (details)	69,000,000	32%–36%–42%–43%–47%	24,000,000–33,000,000
Gabon (details)	1,389,201	30.7%	426,000
Gambia (details)	1,593,256	1%–<3.5%	16,000–<56,000
Georgia (details)	3,929,581 (Note: Data not including Abkhazia and Tskhinvali Region/South Ossetia)	0.5%	19,593
Germany (details)	83,550,000	21%–23.0%	19,220,000
Ghana (details)	30,753,327	6.5%–10.0%–11%	3,071,844
Greece (details)	10,413,982	0.5%–2.4%	250,000
Grenada (details)	115,000	36%	40,000
Guatemala (details)	18,000,000	39%–42.4%–45%–48.9%	7,000,000–8,800,000
Guinea (details)	9,467,866	4.8%	454,000
Guinea-Bissau (details)	2,100,000	17.9%–22.2%	370,000–470,000
Guyana (details)	746,955	7.1%	53,034
Haiti (details)	10,000,000	55%–56.7%–56.8%	5,470,000
Honduras (details)	10,000,000	36%	3,600,000
Hungary (details)	9,603,634	29.2%–30.1%	2,808,990–2,886,619
Iceland (details)	394,324	3.95%	15,558
India (details)	1,400,000,000	1.2%–1.5%	16,800,000–21,000,000
Indonesia (details)	270,000,000	3.07%	8,861,999
Iran (details)	85,202,000	0%–0.03%	2000–6000–21,000–22,000
Iraq (details)	46,000,000	0%–0.2%	100,000
Ireland (details)	5,100,000	69%	3,500,000
Israel (details)	10,000,000	1.2%	120,000
Italy (details)	59,000,000	66.7%–69%–73.6%–74%–74.5%–79%	40,000,000–47,000,000
Ivory Coast (details)	23,800,000	17%–18.6%	4,046,000
Jamaica (details)	2,697,983	2.2%	59,356
Japan (details)	124,000,000	0.4%–0.5%	496,000–620,000
Jordan (details)	11,000,000	0%–0.4%	44,000
Kazakhstan (details)	15,185,844	0.5%–0.6%	91,115
Kenya (details)	47,560,000	17.9%–20.6%–26%–30%	9,797,000-14,268,000
Kiribati (details)	119,438	58.9%	70,333
Kosovo (details)	1,590,000	1.75%	27,815
Kuwait (details)	3,200,000–4,800,000	8.5%	272,000–408,000
Kyrgyzstan (details)	5,146,281	0.2%	10,000
Laos (details)	6,217,141	0.5%	30,000–100,000
Latvia (details)	1,800,000	17.1%–18%	324,000
Lebanon (details)	5,300,000	30.1%	1,595,000
Lesotho (details)	2,116,427	38.9%–39%	825,000
Liberia (details)	3,482,211	2.3%	80,000
Libya (details)	5,765,563	0%–0.7%	40,358
Liechtenstein (details)	40,000	69.6%	28,000
Lithuania (details)	2,900,000	74.2%	2,200,000
Luxembourg (details)	690,000	46%	317,000
Madagascar (details)	18,040,341	38.1%–41.7%	7,890,000
Malawi (details)	17,563,749	17.2%	3,028,435
Malaysia (details)	34,671,895	0%–4.61%–4.7%	1,330,000–1,400,000
Maldives (details)	349,106	0%–0.02%	80
Mali (details)	12,291,529	0.5%	61,000
Malta (details)	451,746	82.6%	373,304
Marshall Islands (details)	62,000	8.5%	5,208
Mauritania (details)	3,086,859	0.1%	3,086
Mauritius (details)	1,233,097	16.5%–24.9%	307,515
Mexico (details)	130,000,000	67%–68%–77.7%	87,000,000–101,000,000
Micronesia, Federated States of (details)	104,468	52.6%–55%	60,000
Moldova (details)	2,409,200	0.1%	2,500
Monaco (details)	38,000	82.3%	30,000
Mongolia (details)	3,300,000	0.04%	1,450
Montenegro (details)	623,633	3.27%	20,408
Morocco (details)	32,725,847	0%–0.07%	22,908
Mozambique (details)	19,406,703	17.1%–27%	5,240,000–5,280,000
Myanmar (details)	42,909,464	0.5%	215,000
Namibia (details)	3,000,000	18.9%–20%	600,000
Nauru (details)	11,680	33.9%	3,959
Nepal (details)	27,676,547	0.03%	8,302
Netherlands (details)	18,000,000	16%–19.1%–20%	2,900,000–3,448,000
New Zealand (details)	5,000,000	8.9%	445,000
Nicaragua (details)	7,000,000	28.3%–42.5%–45%	2,000,000–3,150,000
Niger (details)	11,665,937	0%–<0.1%	11,665
Nigeria (details)	230,000,000	5%–10.6%–15.4%–16%	24,400,000–29,000,000
North Korea (details)	22,912,177	0%–<0.1%	800
North Macedonia (details)	1,836,713	0.4%	6,746
Norway (details)	5,367,580	2.9%–3%	165,254
Oman (details)	3,000,000	4.1%	110,000
Pakistan (details)	241,500,000	0%–0.8%	1,930,000
Palau (details)	17,614	46.9%	6,363
Palestine (details)	3,761,904	2%	80,000
Panama (details)	3,500,000	52%–63%	1,820,000–2,200,000
Papua New Guinea (details)	7,000,000	26%	1,820,000
Paraguay (details)	6,800,000	72%	4,900,000
Peru (details)	34,300,000	64%–67%–76%	26,725,000
Philippines (details)	114,000,000	78.8%–80%	89,000,000
Poland (details)	38,496,000	71.1%–85%–92%	27,332,000-35,400,000
Portugal (details)	10,343,066	80.2%	8,000,000
Qatar (details)	863,051	10.5%	350,000
Romania (details)	19,053,815	4.5%	856,961
Russia (details)	143,500,000	0.1%–<0.5%	143,000–<717,000
Rwanda (details)	13,246,394	39.91%	5,286,600
Saint Kitts and Nevis (details)	51,000	6.7%	3,400
Saint Lucia (details)	171,834	50.61%	86,967
Saint Vincent and the Grenadines (details)	106,000	7.5%	7,950
Samoa (details)	205,557	18%	36,906
San Marino (details)	32,500	86.2–90.5%	28,000
São Tomé and Príncipe (details)	200,000	51.4%–54%–55.7	120,000
Saudi Arabia (details)	26,417,599	2.5%–3.8%	660,439
Senegal (details)	11,126,832	2.4%–<2.7%	<300,000
Serbia (details)	6,647,003	3.9%	257,269
Seychelles (details)	102,612	61.3%–76.6%	62,952
Sierra Leone (details)	6,017,643	3.4%	200,000
Singapore (details)	3,459,093	7%	242,681
Slovakia (details)	5,450,000	59.8%	3,038,511
Slovenia (details)	2,116,972	56.6%–57.8%–69.92%	1,480,156
Solomon Islands (details)	720,956	20%	144,078
Somalia (details)	8,591,629	0.001%–<0.1%	100
South Africa (details)	60,000,000	3.1%–6.8%–9%	4,080,000
South Korea (details)	51,000,000	6.8%–7.9%–8%–11%–11.3%	3,470,000-5,760,000
South Sudan (details)	10,000,000	39.7%	3,950,000
Spain (details)	49,800,000	47%–54.8%	23,400,000–27,000,000
Sri Lanka (details)	20,264,000	6.1%	1,237,000
Sudan (details)	31,000,000	0%–1%–3%	300,000
Suriname (details)	551,000	21.6%	119,000
Sweden (details)	10,600,000	1%	106,000–126,286
Switzerland (details)	9,000,000	30.0%	2,700,000
Syria (details)	23,900,000	1%	239,000
Taiwan (details)	23,600,000	1.4%–1.6%	330,000
Tajikistan (details)	7,163,506	0%–0.01%	<1,000
Tanzania (details)	70,000,000	19.3%–25.6%	13,500,000–17,900,000
Thailand (details)	69,000,000	0.5%–0.58%	388,468
Timor-Leste (details)	1,248,705	97.5%	1,217,157
Togo (details)	8,058,172	20.2%–21%	1,688,420
Tonga (details)	102,000	13.7%	13,649
Trinidad and Tobago (details)	1,330,000	21.6%	286,000
Tunisia (details)	11,000,000	0%–0.1%	11,000
Turkey (details)	86,000,000	0%–0.05%	27,000–50,000
Turkmenistan (details)	4,750,000	0.01%	500
Tuvalu (details)	11,600	0.5%	50
Uganda (details)	49,000,000	39.3%–40.8%	19,200,000–22,000,000
Ukraine (details)	41,000,000	7.6%–8.2%–9%–10%–12.2%	3,362,000–5,002,000
United Arab Emirates (details)	2,563,212	5%	128,160
United Kingdom (details)	63,100,000	9%–11%	5,700,000-6,930,000
United States (details)	341,000,000	19%-20% –22%	65,000,000–75,000,000
Uruguay (details)	3,500,000	11.3%–33%	1,330,000
Uzbekistan (details)	26,851,195	0.01%–0.2%	2,685
Vatican City (details)	842	100%	842
Vanuatu (details)	293,963	12.11%	35,602
Venezuela (details)	32,000,000	64.2%–71%–72%	20,000,000–23,360,000
Vietnam (details)	104,800,000	4.4%–6.1%–6.6%	5,866,000–7,000,000
Western Sahara (details)	273,008	0.06%	163
Yemen (details)	20,727,063	0.02%	4,145
Zambia (details)	18,340,343	17.56%–22.4%	3,220,214
Zimbabwe (details)	15,178,957	6.4%–8.4%	975,488
Total	8,000,000,000	13.57%–17.68%	1,085,600,000–1,420,400,000

== By dependent territory ==
Catholic Church by territory
Territory	Total population	% Catholic	Catholic total
U.S. Virgin Islands (details)	104,377	27.1%	28,000
Anguilla (details)	13,572	6.8%	920
Aruba (details)	101,484	75.3%	76,464
Bermuda (details)	64,237	14.5%	9,340
British Virgin Islands (details)	28,054	8.9%	2,492
Cayman Islands (details)	68,811	13.6%	9,348
Cook Islands (details)	14,987	16.7%	2,500
Curaçao (details)	142,180	72.8%	103,507
Falkland Islands (details)	3,000	10%	300
French Guiana (details)	221,500	75%	166,500
Greenland (details)	55,984	0.2%	111
Guadeloupe (details)	405,500	85.2%	345,486
Guam (details)	154,623	85%	131,430
Northern Mariana Islands (details)	51,659	64.1%	33,113
Hong Kong (details)	7,409,800	4.1%–5.3%	394,000
Martinique (details)	390,000	80%	312,000
Macau (details)	650,000	4.4%–4.6%	30,000
New Caledonia (details)	249,000	60.2%	150,000
Puerto Rico (details)	3,019,450	49.2%–56%	1,485,000–1,691,000
Réunion (details)	839,500	79.7%	669,249
Saint Pierre and Miquelon (details)	6,025	93%	5,600
Turks and Caicos Islands (details)	22,352	11.4%	2,548
Wallis and Futuna (details)	14,231	95.8%	13,631

== See also ==
- The term Roman Catholic
- Christianity by country
- List of Catholic archdioceses (by country and continent)
- List of Catholic dioceses (alphabetical) (including archdioceses)
- List of Catholic dioceses (structured view) (including archdioceses)
- List of Christian denominations by number of members
- List of current cardinals (sortable by name, country, and birthdate)
- List of popes
- List of religious populations
- State religion#Roman Catholicism
- Eastern Catholic Churches
