= Catholic Church in Bahrain =

The Catholic Church in Bahrain is part of the worldwide Catholic Church, under the spiritual leadership of the Pope in Rome.

The first Catholic church built in the Persian Gulf in modern times was constructed in 1939 on land given by the Emir of Bahrain. Sacred Heart Church serves approximately 140,000 Catholics. Bahrain established diplomatic relations with the Vatican in 1999.

The Cathedral of Our Lady of Arabia located in Awali is the largest Catholic church in the Arabian Peninsula. The land for the church is being provided by King Hamad bin Isa Al Khalifa due to a request from Pope Benedict XVI in December 2008, and will cover 9,000 square meters.

Bahrain forms part of the Apostolic Vicariate of Northern Arabia. The seat of the vicariate is in Cathedral of Our Lady of Arabia. The Vicar Apostolic Bishop is Aldo Berardi.

== 21st century ==
In 2022, approximately 12% of the population were Christian. Almost 10% of the country's population is Catholic, making it the largest Christian denomination in Bahrain.

Protests from various Islamist groups have occurred over the donation of land for the construction of the church. Although Bahrain does have a small native Christian population, most Catholics in Bahrain are expatriates from India, the Philippines, Sri Lanka, Lebanon, and Western countries. Many parishioners cross the border from Saudi Arabia, where there are no churches and practising Christianity publicly is forbidden. Churches in the country include Sacred Heart Church, Manama, and Our Lady of Arabia Cathedral in Awali in central Bahrain. Also, there are two communities for Eastern Catholic churches, the Syro Malankara Catholic Community and Syro-Malabar Society.

== Papal visit in 2022 ==
Pope Francis visited the Kingdom of Bahrain from 3 to 6 November 2022, on the occasion of the "Bahrain Forum for Dialogue: East and West for Human Coexistence", the first papal visit to Bahrain. The four-day visit included several important events, beginning on 3 November with the departure of the Pope from Rome's Fiumicino International Airport to Awali, Bahrain. His arrival at Sakhir Air Base in Awali was greeted with an official welcome ceremony. From there, he proceeded to Sakhir Royal Palace, where he paid a courtesy visit to the king, followed by a welcome ceremony and a meeting with the authorities, civil society, and the diplomatic corps.

On 4 November, the Pope presided over the closing ceremony of the "Bahrain Forum for Dialogue: East and West for Human Coexistence" at Al-Fida' Square of Sakhir Royal Palace. He then had a private meeting with the Grand Imam of al-Azhar in the Papal Residence within the grounds of Sakhir Royal Palace, followed by a meeting with the members of the Muslim Council of Elders at the Mosque of Sakhir Royal Palace. Later in the day, he participated in an ecumenical meeting and prayer for peace at Our Lady of Arabia Cathedral.

On 5 November, the Pope celebrated Holy Mass at Bahrain National Stadium and held a meeting with the youth at Sacred Heart School.

The final day of the visit, 6 November, included a prayer meeting and Angelus with bishops, priests, consecrated persons, seminarians, and pastoral workers at Sacred Heart Church in Manama. The visit concluded with a farewell ceremony at Sakhir Air Base in Awali before the Pope departed by air to Rome.

== See also ==
- Catholic Church by country
- Christianity in Bahrain
- Religion in Bahrain
- Sacred Heart Church (Manama, Bahrain)
- The Cathedral of our Lady of Arabia, Bahrain
