= List of Catholic dioceses in Northern Arabia =

The Catholic Church in Northern Arabia comprises only one exempt Latin Apostolic Vicariate missionary pre-diocesan jurisdiction, entitled to a titular bishop: the Apostolic Vicariate of Northern Arabia, in Kuwait City, which covers all of Kuwait, Bahrain, Saudi Arabia and Qatar.

There is no Eastern Catholic jurisdiction on the Arabian Peninsula.

The Apostolic Nunciatures (papal representations at embassy level) to Bahrain, to Qatar, and to Kuwait are all vested in the Apostolic Nunciature to Kuwait.

The papal diplomacy also nominally includes a joint Apostolic Delegation of Arabic Peninsula for Saudi Arabia (which has no papal legation), Bahrain and Oman (which has no papal legation), which is also vested in the Apostolic Nunciature to and in Kuwait.

== Current Latin jurisdictions ==
- Apostolic Vicariate of Northern Arabia, in Kuwait City

There are no defunct proper jurisdictions in Bahrain, Oman, Qatar or Saudi Arabia.

== See also ==
- Roman Catholicism in Bahrain
- Roman Catholicism in Kuwait
- Roman Catholicism in Oman
- Roman Catholicism in Qatar
- Roman Catholicism in Saudi Arabia
- Roman Catholicism in Yemen

== Sources and external links ==
- GCatholic - Middle East - data to all sections
