= Catholic Church in the Middle East =

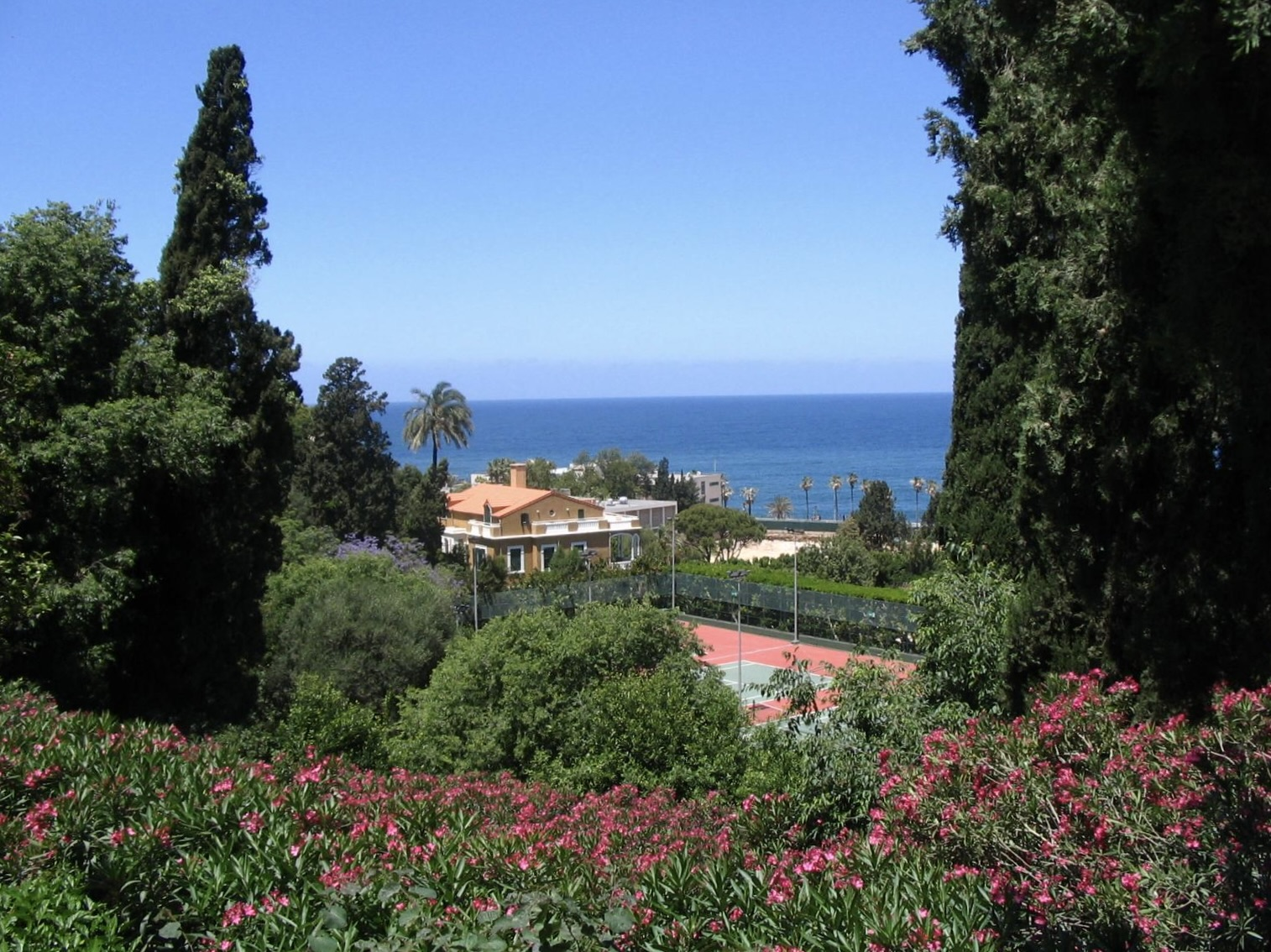
Lebanon has the highest rate of Christians in the Middle East, where the percentage ranges between 39% and 40.5% of its population. (no official census has been made in Lebanon since 1932). The majority of these consists of the Maronite Church based in Beirut, an Eastern Catholic church in full communion with the Pope and the rest of the Catholic Church.

The Catholic Church in the Middle East is under the spiritual leadership of the Pope in Rome. The Catholic Church is said to have traditionally originated in the Middle East in the 1st century AD, and was one of the major religions of the region from the 4th-century Byzantine reforms until the centuries following the Arab Islamic conquests of the 7th century AD. Ever since, its proportion has decreased until today's diaspora tendency, mainly due to persecution by Islamic majority societies.

The largest group remaining in the Middle East is the Maronite Church based in Beirut, Lebanon, an Eastern Catholic church in full communion with the Pope and the rest of the Catholic Church.

For specific nations (including Eastern Catholic churches), see:

- Catholic Church in Armenia
  - Armenian Catholic Church
- Catholic Church in Azerbaijan
- Catholic Church in Bahrain
- Catholic Church in Cyprus
- Catholic Church in Egypt
  - Coptic Catholic Church
- Catholic Church in Georgia
- Catholic Church in Iran
- Catholic Church in Iraq
  - Chaldean Catholic Church
- Catholic Church in Israel
- Catholic Church in Jordan
- Catholic Church in Kuwait
- Catholic Church in Lebanon
  - Maronite Church
- Catholic Church in Oman
- Catholic Church in Palestine
- Catholic Church in Qatar
- Catholic Church in Saudi Arabia
- Catholic Church in Syria
  - Syriac Catholic Church
  - Melkite Catholic Church
- Catholic Church in Turkey
  - Greek Byzantine Catholic Church
- Catholic Church in the United Arab Emirates
- Catholic Church in Yemen

In addition, the Latin Church in the Middle East comprise Latin Catholics, called Latins during the Middle Ages, subject to the Latin Patriarchate of Jerusalem.

== Overview ==
Christianity in the Middle East is characterized by its diverse beliefs and traditions, compared to Christianity in other parts of the Old World. In 2010, Christians were estimated to make up 5% of the total Middle Eastern population, down from 20% in the early 20th century. This was before the devastating civil wars in Syria and Iraq.

Proportionally, Cyprus has the highest rate of Christians in the Middle East, where the percentage ranges between 76% and 78%. Lebanon has the second highest rate of Christians in the Middle East, where the percentage ranges between 39% and 40.5%, followed directly by Egypt where most likely Christians (especially ethnic Copts) account for about 10 percent, while in total the largest absolute figures.

The majority of the Lebanese Christians consists of the Maronite Church based in Beirut, an Eastern Catholic church in full communion with the Pope and the rest of the Catholic Church.

== Demographics ==
The second largest Christian group in the Middle East are the Arabic-speaking Maronites who are Catholics and number some 1.1–1.2 million across the Middle East, mainly concentrated within Lebanon. Many Maronites often avoid an Arabic ethnic identity in favour of a pre-Arab Phoenician or Canaanite heritage, to which most of the Lebanese population belongs. In Israel, Maronites are classified as ethnic Arameans and not Lebanese (together with smaller Aramaic-speaking Christian populations of Syriac Orthodox and Greek Catholics).

The Arab Christians, who are mostly descended from Arab Christian tribes, are significantly adherents of the Eastern Orthodox Church. They number more than 1.5 million. Catholics of the Latin Church are small in numbers. Most Catholics are Maronites, Melkites, Catholic Syrians, Armenians and Chaldean Catholic Assyrians (from Iraq). Protestants altogether number about 400,000. Arabized Melkite Catholics of the Byzantine Rite, who are usually referred to as Arab Christians, number over 1 million in the Middle East. They came into existence as a result of a schism within the Greek Orthodox Church of Antioch over the election of a Patriarch in 1724.

A 2015 study estimates 483,500 Christian believers from a Muslim background in the Middle East, most of them belonging to some form of Protestantism.

== Decline ==
The number of Middle Eastern Christians is dropping due to such factors as low birth rates compared with Muslims, disproportionately high emigration rates, and ethnic and religious persecution. In addition, political turmoil has been and continues to be a major contributor pressing indigenous Middle Eastern Christians of various ethnicities towards seeking security and stability outside their homelands. Recent spread of Jihadist and Salafist ideology, foreign to the tolerant values of the local communities in Syria and Egypt has also played a role in unsettling Christians' decades-long peaceful existence. In 2011, it was estimated that at the present rate, the Middle East's 12 million Christians would likely drop to 6 million by the year 2020.

== See also ==
- Catholic Church in Europe
- Catholic Church in Asia
- Catholic Church in Africa
- Catholic Church and Islam
  - List of converts to the Catholic Church from Islam
- Eastern Catholic Churches
- Latin Church in the Middle East
- Christianity in the Middle East
- Persecution of Christians
