= Religion in Bahrain =

Religion in Bahrain (2020) by Pew Research
1. Islam (69.7%)
2. Christianity (14.1%)
3. Hinduism (10.2%)
4. Buddhism (3.10%)
5. Other (0.90%)
6. Unaffiliated (2.00%)

The Constitution of Bahrain states that Islam is the official religion and that Shari'a (Islamic law) is a principal source for legislation. Article 22 of the Constitution provides for freedom of conscience, the inviolability of worship, and the freedom to perform religious rites and hold religious parades and meetings, in accordance with the customs observed in the country; however, the Government has placed some limitations on the exercise of this right.

== Religious demography ==
Among the citizens of Bahrain in 2010, 99.8% were Muslim according to the government's published census statistics, although the Muslim proportion falls to 70.2% when the non-national population is included. The current census data does not differentiate between the other religions in Bahrain, but there are about 1,000 Christian citizens and fewer than 40 Jewish citizens. The Bahraini citizens of Muslim faith belong to the Shi'a and Sunni branches of Islam. The last official census (1941) showed that 52% (88,298 citizens) of the Muslim population were Shia and the remaining 48% were Sunni. During the 1980s, unofficial sources, such as the Library of Congress Country Studies, and The New York Times, estimated that 45% of Bahraini population were Sunnis, while 55% were Shias. The last official Bahraini document published in 2011 stated that 51% of the country's citizens were Sunnis, while the Shi'ite population had declined to 49% of the citizenry.

Foreigners, overwhelmingly from South Asia and other Arab countries, constituted 54% of the population in 2010. Of these, 45% are Muslim and 55% non-Muslim, including Christians (primarily: Catholic, Protestant, Malankara Orthodox, and Mar Thoma from South India), Hindus, Baháʼís, Buddhists, and Sikhs.

== Status of religious freedom ==
=== Legal and policy framework ===
The Constitution states that Islam is the official religion of the country and also provides for freedom of religion; however, there were limits on this right. The Government allows religion-based, political nongovernmental organizations to register as political "societies", which operate somewhat like parties with the legal authority to conduct political activities. Parliamentary and municipal elections were held in 2006 and all political societies participated, including the largest Shi'a political society, which had boycotted the last parliamentary elections in 2002. Of eligible voters, 73% participated in the elections.

Every religious group must obtain a license from the Ministry of Justice and Islamic Affairs (MOJIA) to operate. In December 2006 the Ministry of Justice and Ministry of Islamic Affairs merged to form the MOJIA. Depending on circumstances, for example, the opening of a religious school, a religious group may also need approval from the Ministry of Social Development, the Ministry of Information, and/or the Ministry of Education. Christian congregations that are registered with the Ministry of Social Development operated freely and were allowed to offer their facilities to other Christian congregations that did not have their places of worship. The Government prohibits anti-Islamic writings.

Four Sikh temples and several Hindu temples are allowed to function freely. During the Indian Prime Minister's visit to Bahrain he announced redevelopment project for the Shrinathji (Krishna) Temple which will cost $4.2 million. The country's only synagogue has not been operational for nearly 60 years.

Holding a religious meeting without a permit is illegal; however, there were no reports of religious groups being denied a permit to gather. Unregistered Christian congregations exist, and there were no reports of the Government attempting to force unregistered congregations to register. The High Council for Islamic Affairs is charged with the review and approval of all clerical appointments within both the Sunni and Shi'a communities and maintains program oversight for all citizens studying religion abroad. Historically there is evidence of discrimination against Shi'a Muslims in recruitment for the country's military and domestic security services. During the reporting period, the Ministry of Defense did not recruit Shi'a for military service. The Ministry of Interior made increasing efforts to recruit additional Shi'a into nonmilitary security agencies during the reporting period.

On April 19, 2007, officials in the Ministry of Education announced that the Ministry, in conjunction with the MOJIA, was developing a new religious education curriculum to be taught in all public schools, beginning the next academic year. According to the Undersecretary of Islamic Affairs, the new curriculum will focus on practices in Islam and jurisprudence and will contain content against radicalism and extremism.

The Undersecretary for Islamic Affairs reportedly stressed to the Ministry of Education that the new curriculum should be inclusive of the convictions of all branches of Islam. Islamic studies are a part of the curriculum in government schools and mandatory for all public school students. The decades-old curriculum is based on the Maliki school of Sunni theology. Proposals to include the Ja'afari traditions of Shi'a Islam in the curriculum have been rejected. The civil and criminal legal systems consist of a complex mix of courts based on diverse legal sources, including Sunni and Shi'a Shari'a, tribal law, and other civil codes and regulations. The number of Shi'a Shari'a judges was slightly higher than the number of their Sunni counterparts.

Although the Constitution provides for women's political rights, Shari'a governs personal status. Specific rights vary according to Shi'a or Sunni interpretations of Islamic law, as determined by the individual's faith, or by the courts in which various contracts originate, including marriage. While both Shi'a and Sunni women have the right to initiate a divorce, religious courts may refuse the request. Women of either branch of Islam may own and inherit property and may represent themselves in all public and legal matters. In the absence of a direct male heir, a Shi'a woman may inherit all property. In contrast, in the absence of a direct male heir, a Sunni woman inherits only a portion as governed by Shari'a; the balance is divided among brothers, uncles, and male cousins of the deceased.

A Muslim woman may legally marry a non-Muslim man only if he first converts to Islam. In such marriages, the children automatically are considered Muslim. In divorce cases, the courts routinely grant Shi'a and Sunni women custody of children until an age at which custody reverts to the father based on Ja'afari and Maliki Islamic law, respectively. In all circumstances except mental incapacitation, the father, regardless of custody decisions, retains the right to make certain legal decisions for his children, such as guardianship of any property belonging to the child, until the child reaches legal age. A noncitizen woman automatically loses custody of her children if she divorces their citizen father.

There are no restrictions on the number of citizens permitted to make pilgrimages to Shi'a shrines and holy sites in Iran, Iraq, and Syria. The Government monitors travel to Iran and scrutinizes carefully those who choose to pursue religious study there. The Government does not designate religion or sect on national identity documents. Upon the birth of a child, parents applying for a birth certificate are asked to provide the child's religion (not sect), but the government-issued birth certificate does not include this information. The law does not prohibit conversion from one religion to another.

The following holidays are considered national holidays: Eid ul-Adha, Eid ul-Fitr, the Birth of the Islamic prophet Muhammad, Day of Ashura, and the Islamic New Year. Leaders representing many religious groups visited the country and met with government and civic leaders. These included the Metropolitan of the Mar Thoma Church in India, the highest official in the church.

=== Restrictions on religious freedom ===
Government policy and practice contribute to the generally free practice of religion. Members of other religious groups who practice their faith privately do so without interference from the Government and are permitted to maintain their own places of worship and display the symbols of their religion, such as crosses and statues of deities and saints. The Government funds all official religious institutions, including Shi'a and Sunni mosques, Shi'a ma`tams (religious community centers), Shi'a and Sunni waqfs (religious endowments), and the religious courts, which represent both the Ja'afari (Shi'a) and Maliki (Sunni) schools of Islamic jurisprudence. The Government permits public religious events, most notably the large annual commemorative marches by Shi'a Muslims during the Islamic months of Ramadan and Muharram.

Converts to Islam from other religious groups were not uncommon, especially in cases of marriage between Muslim men and non-Muslim women. These converts were normally welcomed into the Muslim community. On the other hand, converts from Islam to other religious groups were not well tolerated by society. It was reported that families and communities often shunned these individuals and sometimes subjected converts to physical abuse. Some of these converts believed it necessary to leave the country permanently.

During the 2011–2012 Arab Spring uprising and crackdown against Shia protest in Bahrain, "dozens" of Shia mosques have been leveled by the government according to a report in McClatchy newspapers. According to Shiite leaders interviewed by the reporter, work crews have often arrived "in the dead of night, accompanied by police and military escorts", to demolish the mosques, and in many cases, have hauled away the buildings' rubble before townspeople awake so as to leave no trace. Sheikh Khalid bin Ali bin Abdulla al Khalifa, the minister of justice and Islamic affairs for Bahrain, defended the demolitions stating: "These are not mosques. These are illegal buildings." However the McClatchy reporter found that photos taken of several mosques before their destruction by the government "showed they were well maintained, decades-old structures."

The MOJIA has repeatedly denied an operating license to a congregation of the Baháʼí Faith, and it refuses to recognize the congregation; the Baháʼí community continued to gather and worship freely without government interference. While the MOJIA views the Baháʼí Faith as an inauthentic offshoot of Islam and blasphemous, some other government ministries included Baháʼí as a religion choice in "drop-down" computer menus for citizens applying for certain government documents.

Bibles and other Christian publications are displayed and sold openly in local bookstores that also sell Islamic and other religious literature. Churches also sell Christian materials, including books, music, and messages from Christian leaders, openly and without restriction. Religious tracts of all branches of Islam, cassettes of sermons delivered by Muslim preachers from other countries, and publications of other religions are readily available. In recent years, the Ministry of Interior has made efforts to reform hiring practices and has increased the hiring of Shi'a citizens. In 2005 a Christian church with more than 1,000 members filed an application with the Ministry of Social Development to form a second parish. The diocese assigned a temporary priest to serve members of the second parish; however, he only stayed 4 months, due to visa restrictions. The new parish applied for a three-year resident visa for a permanent priest. By the close of the reporting period, government officials still had not notified church leaders of a final decision on the request to allow a second parish or to grant a resident visa for a permanent priest. Further requests by church officials for information went unanswered. There were no reports of religious prisoners or detainees in the country.

In February 2011, the tensions between the Sunni ruling minority and the Shi'a majority spilled over into street protests which was violently suppressed by police forces, resulting in multiple civilian deaths. McClatchy Newspapers/csmonitor.com reported that as of mid-May 2011,

Authorities have held secret trials where protesters have been sentenced to death, arrested prominent mainstream opposition politicians, jailed nurses and doctors who treated injured protesters, seized the health care system that had been run primarily by Shiites, fired 1,000 Shiite professionals and canceled their pensions, detained students and teachers who took part in the protests, beat and arrested journalists, and forced the closure of the only opposition newspaper.

Unnamed U.S. officials interviewed by McClatchy expressed concern over "vindictive" Sunni leadership in Bahrain and stated that the Obama administration was "deeply worried about Bahrain's rapid downward spiral."

=== Forced religious conversion ===
Bahrain has no history of engaging in forced religious conversion. Foreign nationals as well as local minorities are able to practice their religion without interference from the government or other religious groups.

=== Status of Jewish community ===
Even though the small Jewish community has been safe from attacks and vandalism. While some anti-Zionist political commentary and editorial cartoons appeared, usually linked to the Israeli–Palestinian conflict, outside of a political context the Jewish minority is fully respected and allowed to operate freely. Jewish people in Bahrain regularly practice their faith privately without interference from the Government. In 2008 Bahrain named Houda Ezra Ebrahim Nonoo, a Jewish female lawmaker, ambassador to the United States.

=== Improvements and positive developments in respect for religious freedom ===
Parliamentary and municipal elections were conducted in November and December 2006. Candidates associated with religion-based political societies won 32 of the 40 seats in the Council of Representatives. During the elections, candidates from religious political groups conducted their campaigns without any interference from the Government. There was one Jewish member and one Christian member of the 40-member upper house of Parliament, the Shura Council, whose members were appointed in December 2006 by the King, following elections for the lower house. The Christian member was chosen by her colleagues to be the second deputy speaker for the Shura Council and is also one of the country's four representatives to the Arab Parliament. There was one Christian municipal council candidate in the elections, but he was defeated. In April 2007 the Bahrain Businesswomen Society initiated a public awareness campaign on family law by sponsoring a panel discussion, the first public event on the topic for several months. The issue was not raised in any significant way during the November/December 2006 elections, despite an awareness campaign by the Supreme Council for Women in the fall of 2005 and seminars by civil society groups, which highlighted the need for a family law. This was followed by public debate and rallies both in favor of and against such a law. During the reporting period, members of the Awali Community Church visited Christian prison inmates approximately monthly, to provide clothing and Christian literature and messages from their home. Members of other churches also made periodic visits to Christian prison inmates.

== 2020s ==
The 2020 World Religions Database states 82% of the country is Muslim, 12% is Christian (primarily Roman Catholic, Protestant, Malankara Orthodox, and Mar Thoma Syrian from South India) and 6% is Hindu.

Minority religious groups report that there is a good degree of tolerance in society for minority religious beliefs and traditions; there is no tolerance for conversion away from Islam.

Camillo Ballin was an Italian-Bahraini priest who became head of the Apostolic Vicariate of Northern Arabia.

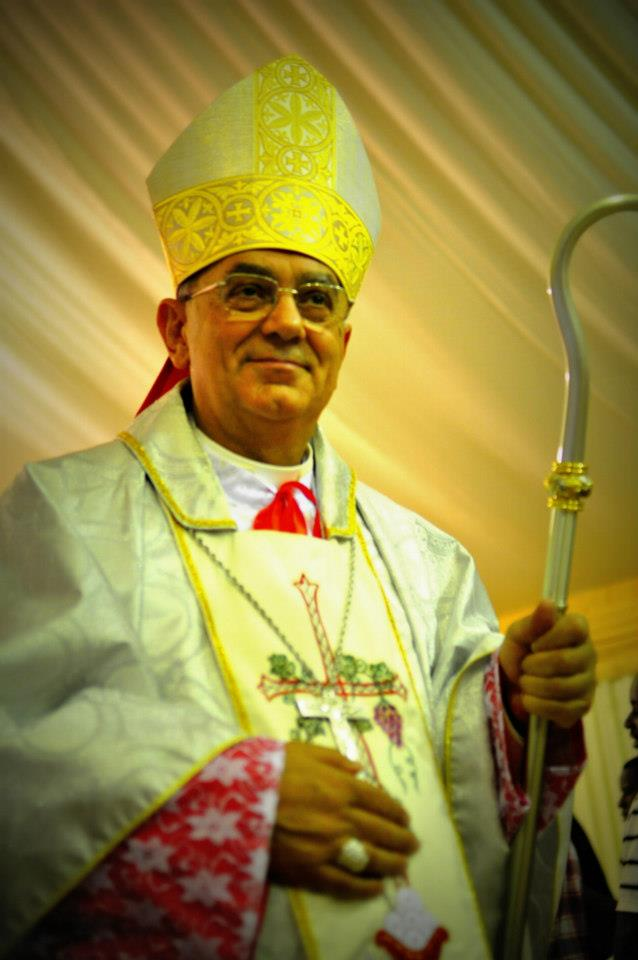
Camillo Ballin

In November 2022, Pope Francis became the first Catholic pope to travel to Bahrain. He held mass in Manama for a crowd of almost 30,000 people.

In 2023, the country was scored 1 out of 4 for religious freedom.

== See also ==
- Demographics of Bahrain
- Islam in Bahrain
- Christianity in Bahrain
- Catholic Church in Bahrain
- Hinduism in Arab states
- History of the Jews in Bahrain
- The Church of Jesus Christ of Latter-day Saints in Bahrain
