= Victor León Esteban San Miguel y Erce =

Emeritus Roman Catholic Bishop (1904–1995)

His Excellency, The Most Reverend Victor León Esteban San Miguel y Erce O.C.D.
- Emeritus Vicar Apostolic of Kuwait
- Church: Catholic Church
- Diocese: Rusubbicari
- See: Apostolic Vicariate of Kuwait
- In office: 1976 to 1981
- Predecessor: Ubaldo Teofano Stella, O.C.D.
- Successor: Francis George Adeodatus Micallef, O.C.D.

Orders
- Ordination: 1 June 1928
- Consecration: 16 July 1976 by Jean-Édouard-Lucien Rupp

Personal details
- Born: Ubaldo Teofano Stella; April 21, 1904 Lequeitio, Spain.
- Died: April 4, 1995 (aged 90) Vitoria-Gasteiz, Spain
- Denomination: Catholic

Victor León Esteban San Miguel y Erce (1 June 1928 – 16 July 1976) was a Spanish Discalced Carmelite friar who served as the apostolic vicar of Kuwait from 1976 to 1981. He was born on April 21, 1904, in Lequeitio, Spain.

== Life ==
=== Early life ===
Victor León Esteban San Miguel y Erce was born in Lequeitio, a town in the province of Biscay in the Basque Country, Spain.

=== Priesthood and Episcopal Ministry ===
He was ordained a priest on June 1, 1928, in the Order of Discalced Carmelites.

After serving as a priest for many years, Victor León Esteban San Miguel y Erce was appointed as the Apostolic Administrator of Kuwait on March 17, 1966. He served in this position for ten years until he was appointed as the Titular Bishop of Rusubbicari and Vicar Apostolic of Kuwait on May 31, 1976.

He was ordained bishop on July 16, 1976, at the St. Joseph and St. Therese of the Infant Jesus in Baghdad, Iraq, by Archbishop Jean-Édouard-Lucien Rupp, the Titular Archbishop of Dionysiopolis, and was assisted by Archbishop Annibale Bugnini, C.M., the Titular Archbishop of Diocletiana, and Archbishop Ernest-Marie de Jésus-Hostie Charles Albert Nyary, O.C.D., the archbishop of Baghdad.

As the apostolic vicar of Kuwait, Victor León Esteban San Miguel y Erce played an important role in the development of the Catholic Church in Kuwait. During his tenure, he oversaw the construction of several churches, including the Holy Family Cathedral, which remains a major landmark in Kuwait City.

=== Retirement ===
Victor León Esteban San Miguel y Erce retired as the vicar apostolic of Kuwait on November 5, 1981, and returned to Spain. He died on April 4, 1995, in Vitoria-Gasteiz, Spain, at the age of 90.

Catholic Church titles
Preceded by Ubaldo Teofano Stella, O.C.D.	Apostolic Vicar of Kuwait; 1955 to 1966	Succeeded by Francis George Adeodatus Micallef, O.C.D.
