= Christianity in Bahrain =

In 2022, Christians in Bahrain made up approximately 12% of the population. Bahrain has had a native Christian community for many centuries, with the first recorded presence dating back to the 12th century. Expatriate Christians, however, make up the majority of Christians in Bahrain, while local Christian Bahrainis (who hold Bahraini citizenship) make up a much smaller community. Alees Samaan, the former Bahraini ambassador to the United Kingdom, is a native Christian.

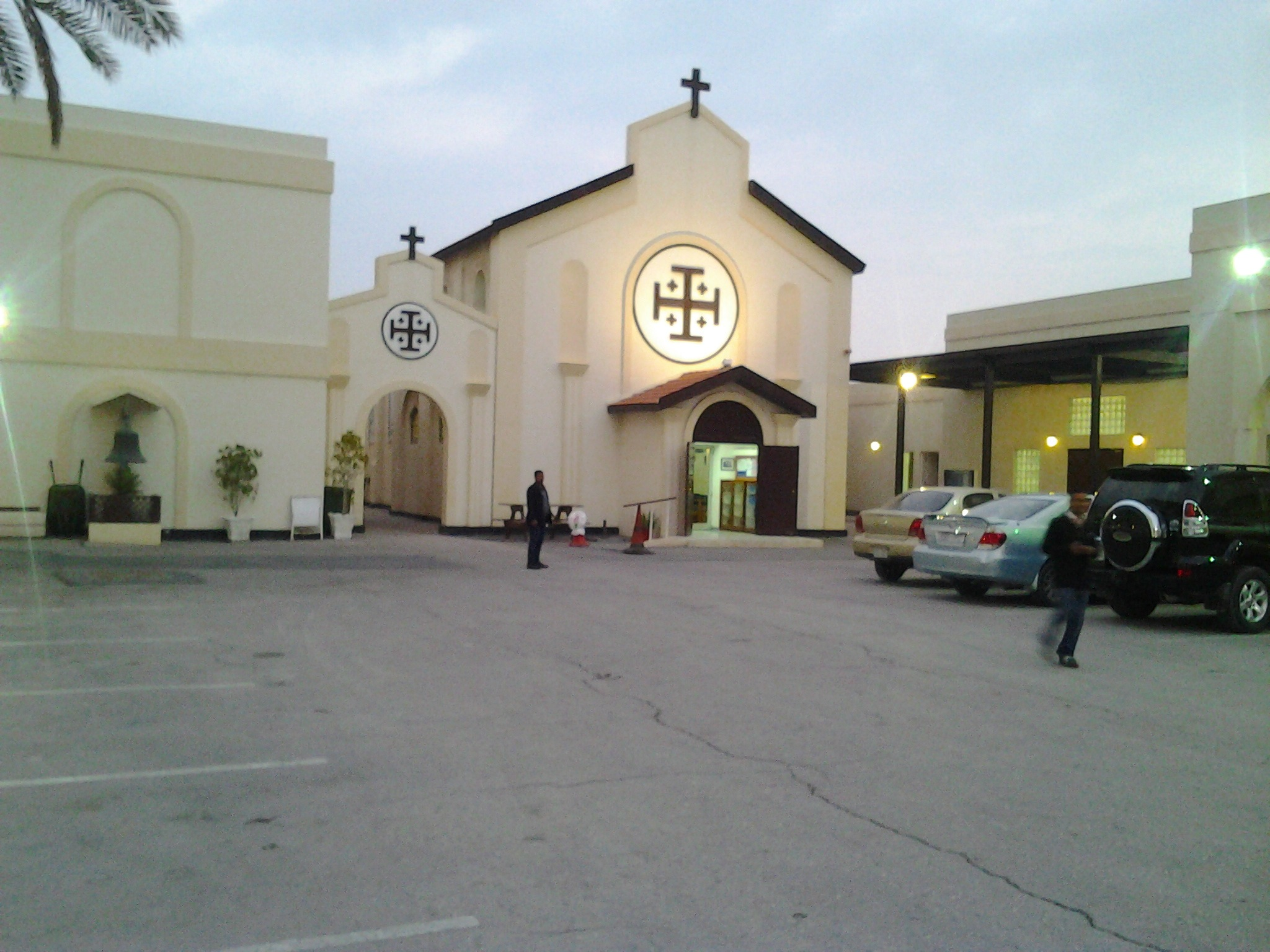
Saint Christopher's cathedral, in the Bahraini capital Manama.

== History ==
=== Early Christianity in Bahrain ===
Excavations at Samahij (Muharraq Island) between 2019 and 2023 uncovered the first confirmed Christian building in Bahrain: a large, well-built structure of eight rooms, radiocarbon-dated to the mid-4th to mid-8th centuries CE. The building — probably the bishop's palace of the diocese referred to in historical sources as Meshmahig/Mašmahig — lay beneath a later mosque, whose presence helped preserve the earlier fabric. Archaeological features included stone and plaster walls, sockets indicating doors and fixed benches, a refectory, living rooms, and a kitchen with hearths formed from amphora bases.

Material evidence links the site to the Church of the East (often called the Nestorian Church), which had an established presence around the Persian Gulf prior to widespread conversion to Islam in the 7th century. Documentary sources note tensions in the Meshmahig bishopric (a bishop was excommunicated in 410 CE and another condemned in the 7th century). The Church of the East's de facto separation from the western (Roman) church occurred in the early 5th century (formalised in the 420s), and the term "Nestorian" became common after the condemnation of Nestorius at Ephesus in 431.

Artefacts show the occupants lived at a relatively high standard and were part of long-distance trade: Indian ceramics, carnelian beads, Sasanian copper coins, and many pottery sherds were found. Domestic and craft remains include glassware (including small wine glasses), spindle whorls and copper needles (the latter suggesting local textile production, possibly linked to liturgical or monastic needs). Food remains indicate a diet including pork, fish shellfish, and various crops pork consumption appears to have ceased after conversion to Islam. Christian identification is confirmed by three plaster crosses and graffiti with early Christian symbols such as the Chi-Rho and the fish.

Excavation co-leaders Professor Timothy Insoll (University of Exeter) and Dr Salman Almahari (Bahrain Authority for Culture and Antiquities) emphasised the find's significance as the earliest and only Christian building so far identified in Bahrain and among the oldest in the Persian Gulf. Local villagers played a key role by pointing archaeologists to a mound beneath a ruined mosque and preserving oral traditions — reportedly including occasional use of Christian personal names — that recalled a pre-Islamic Christian past. Similar early Christian sites are known elsewhere around the Gulf (in parts of Iran, Kuwait, the UAE and eastern Saudi Arabia), but most are in uninhabited locations and generally post-date Samahij, underscoring the importance of the discovery. A museum to display the Samahij finds was planned for 2025.

The Church of the East survives in several modern bodies, including the Assyrian Church of the East (based in Erbil) the Ancient Church of the East (based in Baghdad), the Chaldean Catholic Church (based in Baghdad), and the Syro-Malabar Church (based in Kerala, India), with communities numbering in the hundreds of thousands to millions in various countries.

=== Present day ===
Christians who hold Bahraini citizenship number approximately 1,000. (Note: 2010 Census shows only two religion categories: "Muslim" and "Other". Reasonably assuming the majority of "Other" Bahraini citizens are Christian.) The majority of the Christians are originally from Iraq, Palestine and Jordan, with a small minority having lived in Bahrain for many centuries; the majority have been living as Bahraini citizens for less than a century. There are also smaller numbers of native Christians who originally hail from Lebanon, Syria, and India.

The majority of Christian Bahraini citizens tend to be Orthodox Christians, with the largest church by membership being the Eastern Orthodox Church. They enjoy many equal religious and social freedoms. Bahrain has Christian members in the Bahraini government. Bahrain is one of two GCC countries to have a native Christian population; the other country, Kuwait, also has a Christian population but in smaller numbers, with fewer than 400 Christian Kuwaiti citizens.

Eastern Orthodox Christians in Bahrain traditionally belong to the jurisdiction of Eastern Orthodox Patriarchate of Antioch and All the East. An Eastern Orthodox parish in Bahrain was organized in 2000 by the late metropolitan Constantine Papastephanou of Baghdad and Kuwait (1969-2014), who also had ecclesiastical jurisdiction over Eastern Orthodox in Bahrain and the United Arab Emirates.

== Expatriate Christians ==
Foreign citizens who live and work in Bahrain make up the majority of Christians in Bahrain. They include people from Europe, North and South America, Africa, Asia, and the Middle East. They belong to various Catholic, Orthodox, and Protestant churches.

== Notable Bahraini Christians ==
- Alees Samaan - Former Bahraini ambassador to the United Kingdom.
- Hani Aziz - Pastor of the Arabic Congregation of the National Evangelical Church in Bahrain
- Hala Qurisa - Second Deputy Chairman of the Shura Council.
- Camillo Ballin, Italian-Bahraini Bishop

== Selected churches ==
- The Father's House AG Church - Full Gospel Pentecostal
- Sacred Heart Church (Manama, Bahrain) - Catholic
- St. Mary's Orthodox Church - Indian Orthodox
- St. George's Antiochian Church - Greek Orthodox
- St. Peter's Jacobite Syrian Orthodox Church
- The Mar Thoma Church & St. Paul's Marthoma Church
- Saar Fellowship
- Indian Pentecostal Church of God Bahrain
- Church of God (Full Gospel) In Bahrain
- IPC SHALOM Bahrain
- House of Praise Community Church
- St Christopher’s Cathedral and Awali Anglican Church
- The National Evangelical Church
- The Bahrain Malayalee Church of South India
- The Indian Pentecostal Church of God, Hebron Bahrain

== See also ==
- Religion in Bahrain
- Roman Catholicism in Bahrain
- Sacred Heart Church (Manama, Bahrain)
- Christians in Bahrain (historical region)
- Christianity in the Middle East
- Arab Christians
- The Church of Jesus Christ of Latter-day Saints in Bahrain
