= Francis George Adeodatus Micallef =

His Excellency Francis George Adeodatus Micallef OCD
- Apostolic Vicar Emeritus of Kuwait
- Church: Roman Catholic
- See: Kuwait
- Appointed: 5 November 1981
- In office: 1981–2005
- Predecessor: Victor León Esteban San Miguel y Erce
- Successor: Camillo Ballin
- Other post: Apostolicus Vicariatus Arabiae Septentrionalis

Orders
- Ordination: 9 May 1954
- Consecration: 6 January 1982 by John Paul II
- Rank: Bishop

Personal details
- Born: Francis George Micallef; 17 December 1928 Birkirkara, Malta
- Died: 3 January 2018 (aged 89) Birkirkara, Malta
- Motto: Magnus Deus Noster

Francis George Adeodatus Micallef (17 December 1928 – 3 January 2018) was a Maltese Discalced Carmelite and a prelate of the Roman Catholic Church. He served for twenty-three years as an Apostolic Vicar of Kuwait.

== Biography ==
Micallef was born in Birkirkara on 17 December 1928 to George and Marianna Micallef. In 1947, he joined the order of Discalced Carmelites, and in 1951, he took his final vows and was professed as a member of the order. On 9 May 1954, Micallef was ordained priest.

After finishing his studies in Rome, he returned to Malta, where he taught moral theology. Once in Malta, he served as the Superior of the Monastery, Master of Novices, and finally as the Provincial Superior of Maltese Discalced Carmelite Province. From 1979-81, he was rector of the Carmelite International College in Rome.

On 5 November 1981, Pope John Paul II appointed Micallef as the third Apostolic Vicar of Kuwait. He was consecrated by the Pope himself on the feast of the Epiphany 1982. On 15 January of the same year, he was officially installed as the Apostolic Vicar of Kuwait and Titular Bishop of Tinis in Proconsulari. Micallef remained in Kuwait City during the 1990 Iraqi invasion, one of the few Westerners to do so.

== Last years and death ==
Bishop Micallef retired on 14 July 2005 and was succeeded by Bishop Camillo Ballin. On 20 October, Bishop Micallef bade farewell to the Vicariate at a special ceremony in the Cathedral of the Holy Family in Kuwait City. Bishop Micallef died on 3 January 2018 in his native Malta.

Catholic Church titles
Preceded by Victor León Esteban San Miguel y Erce, OCD	Apostolic Vicar of Kuwait; 1981 to 2005	Succeeded by Camillo Ballin, MCCJ
