= Our Lady of Arabia =

Catholic title of the Blessed Virgin Mary

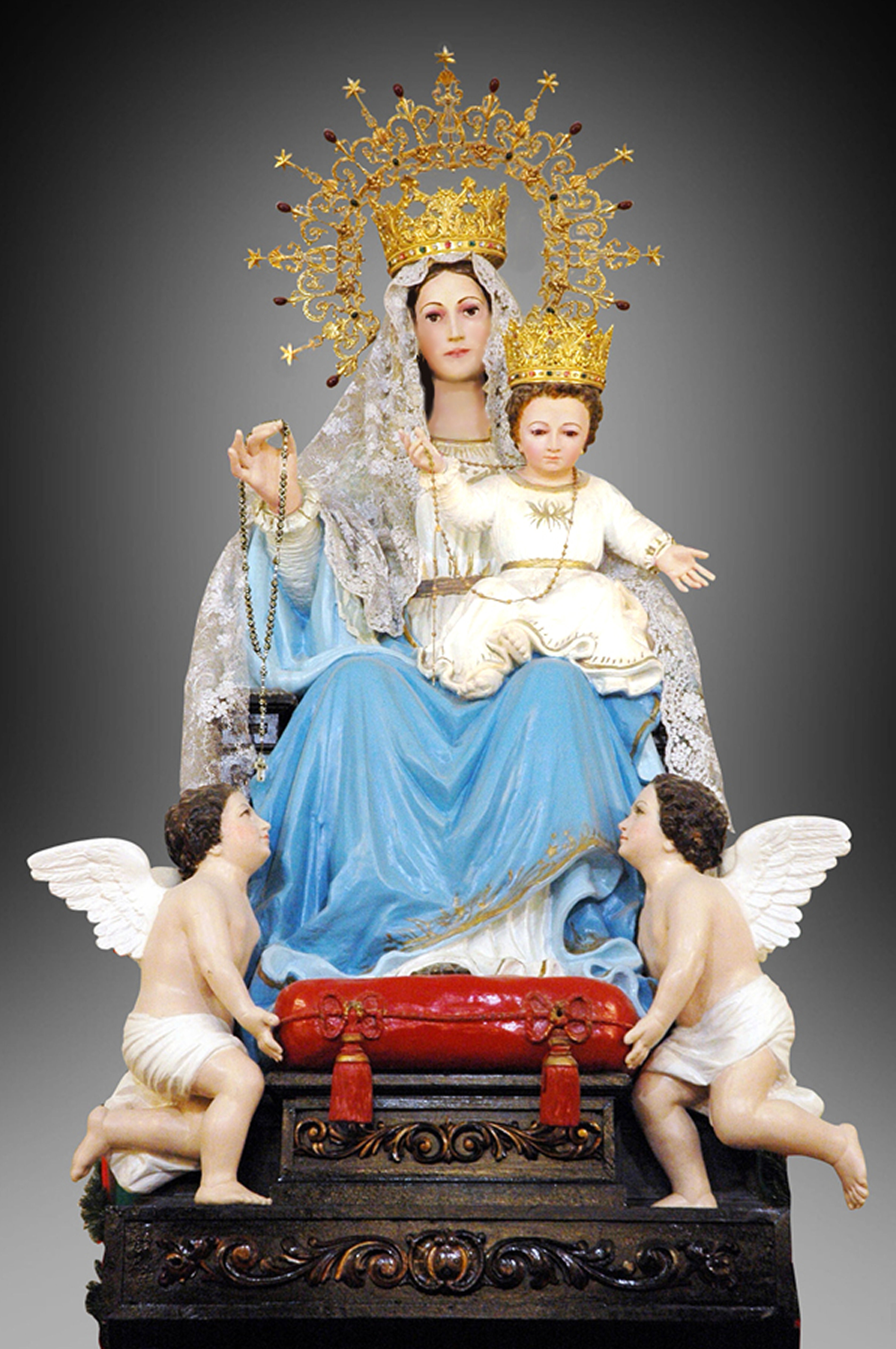
- Depiction of the canonically crowned image
- Location: Al Ahmadi, Kuwait
- Witness: Bishop Teofano Stella, OCD
- Approval: Pope Pius XII; Pope John XXIII
- Shrine: Basilica of Our Lady of Arabia, Ahmadi, Kuwait
- Patronage: Arabian Peninsula; Apostolic Vicariate of Southern Arabia

Our Lady of Arabia (Latin: Domina Nostra de Arabia) is a Catholic title of the Blessed Virgin Mary holding a Rosary and the Child Jesus, as venerated in Kuwait and Bahrain by its devotees. Under this venerated Marian title, she is designated as the patroness of the Apostolic Vicariates of Northern and Southern Arabia.

== History ==
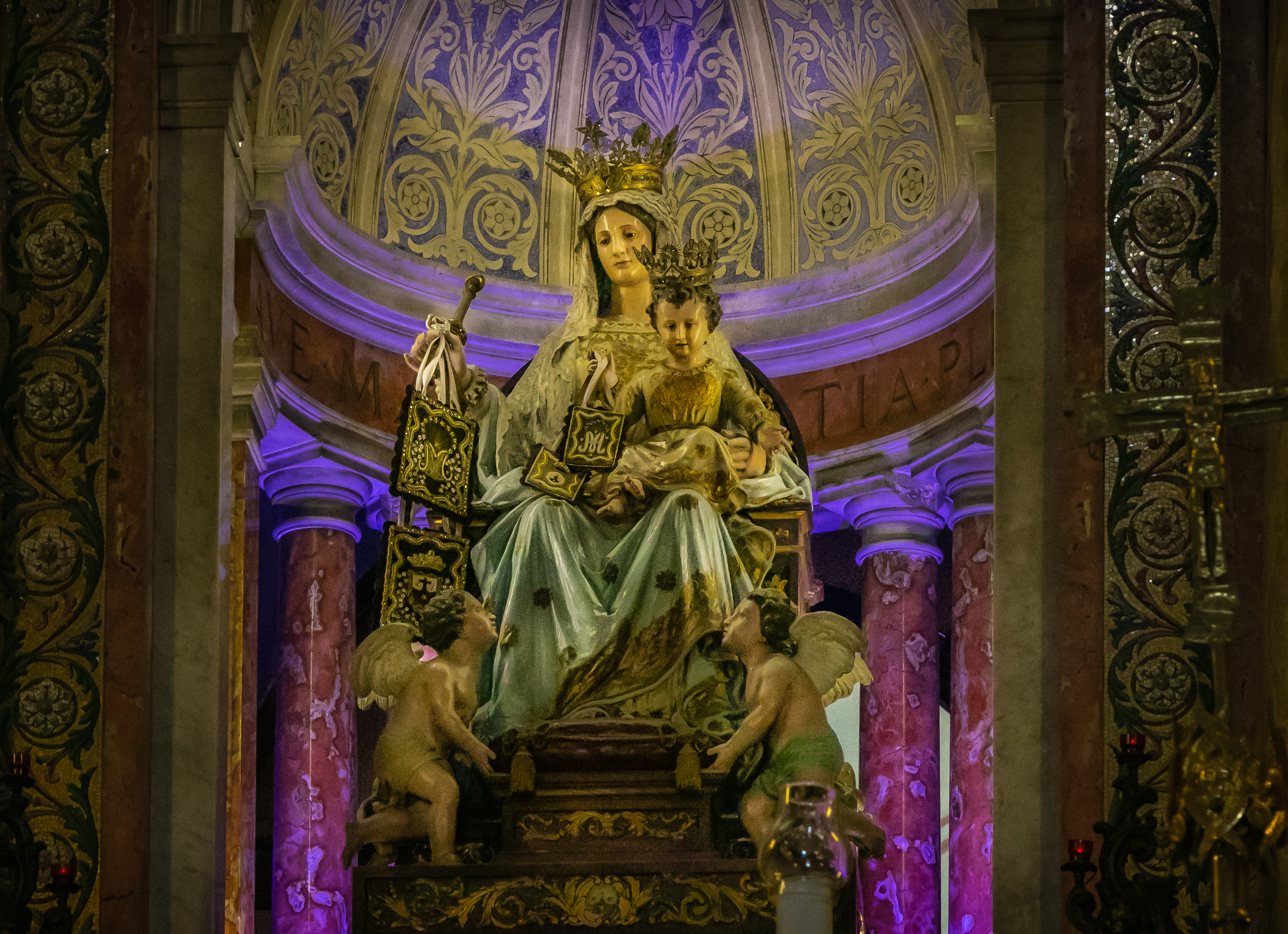
The original venerated image of "Our Lady of the Holy Scapular of Mount Carmel" (1919) enshrined at the Stella Maris Monastery, Haifa, Israel

The present image is derived from a 1919 statuary image of Our Lady of Mount Carmel which originated from the Basilica of Stella Maris Monastery in Haifa.

A lithograph copy of this Marian image was brought to Al Ahmadi, Kuwait on 1 May 1948. On the Feast of the Immaculate Conception 1948, the Catholic priest, Father Teofano Ubaldo Stella of the Carmelite Order had it framed and brought out for public veneration. In 1949, the Legion of Mary used their own image of Our Lady of Miracles, which encouraged Father Stella to commission an image in Italy under the sculpting company Rosa and Zanzio Ditta to carve a statue of the Madonna and Child using a cedar of Lebanon. The image was brought to Pope Pius XII who also venerated the image and authorised its Marian title.

On the feast of the Epiphany, 6 January 1950, the statue was returned to Kuwait for public veneration by the faithful.

In 1954, Kuwaiti soldiers travelled to Rome for the hundredth anniversary of the Dogma of the Immaculate Conception, and presented another replica of the image at the Parish of Saint Teresa in Rome. On 16 September 1954, the same image was brought to Pope Pius XII, who blessed the statue at Castel Gandolfo. In May 1956, Pius XII sent a special candle to the new parish built in Ahmadi, especially chosen by him from that year's Candlemas ceremonies in Rome.

In 1956, Bishop Stella petitioned the Holy See to proclaim the Blessed Virgin Mary under the title of Our Lady of Arabia as Patroness of Kuwait. Pope Pius XII granted his consent via the papal bull Regnum Mariae on 25 January 1957. A solid gold crown studded with precious rubies and diamonds was crafted and then brought to Rome, where Pope John XXIII personally blessed it on 17 March 1960. Bishop Stella donated a particular pearl to the crown as well.

The canonical coronation was further authorised by Pope John XXIII, which occurred on 25 March 1960 via the Papal legate Cardinal Valerian Gracias of Bombay. on 5 January 2011, Pope Benedict XVI approved the patronage by assigning the Marian title was the principal patroness for the Apostolic Vicariates of Kuwait and the Apostolic Vicariate of Arabia, which were later renamed as Apostolic Vicariate of Northern Arabia and Apostolic Vicariate of Southern Arabia.

A smaller replica of the venerated Marian image is also enshrined at the capital city of Holy Family Cathedral, Kuwait.

The 1919 original image under the devotional title of "Our Lady of the Scapular" remains enshrined at the Stella Maris Monastery in Haifa, Israel.

== Pontifical approbations ==
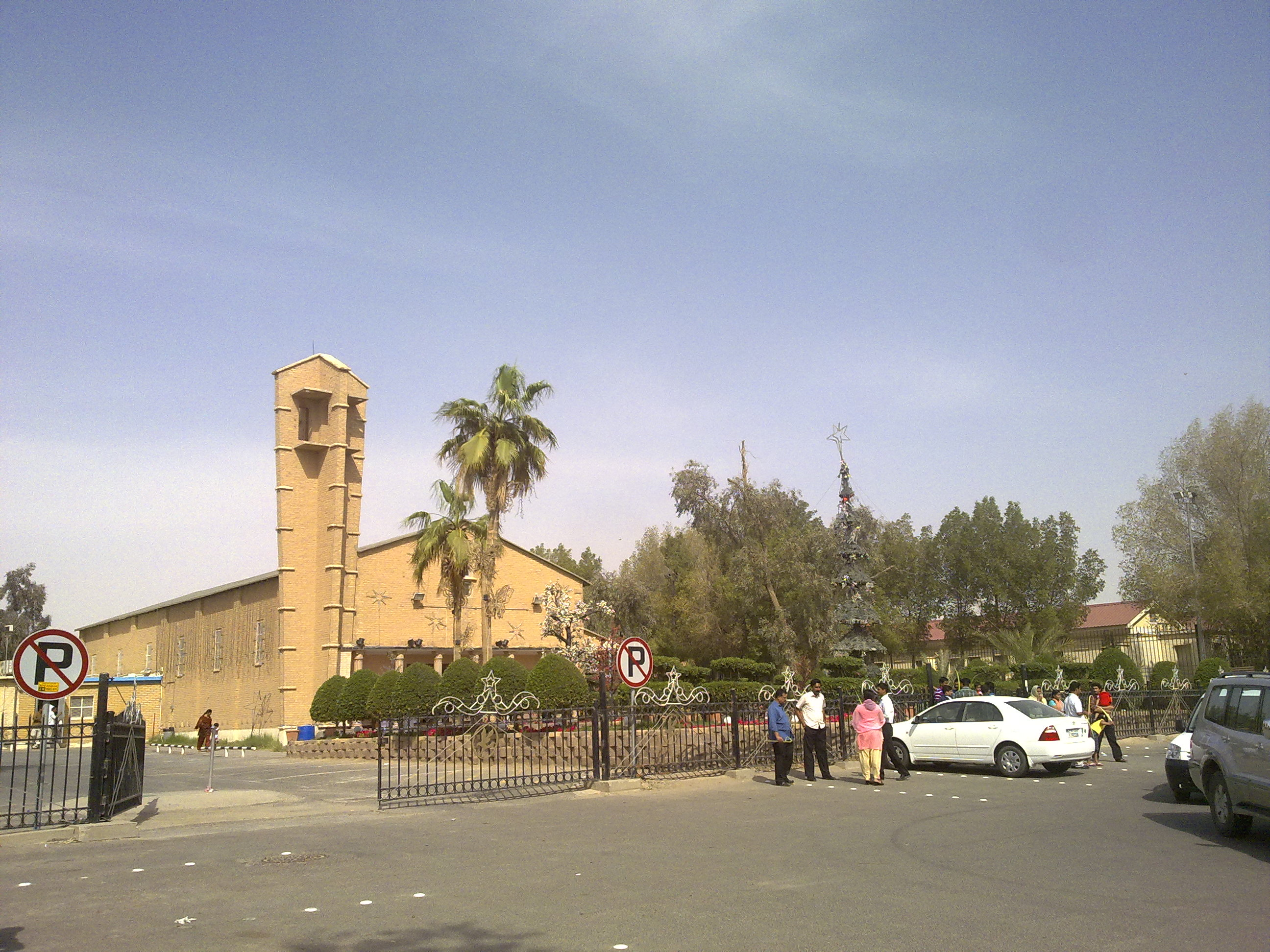
Present Church where the image is enshrined and venerated

- Pope Pius XII – authorised the devotion to the statue on 17 December 1949 at the Apostolic Palace, to which he also consented to be photographed venerating the image. The same pontiff made the Marian title Patroness of the Arabian Peninsula on 25 January 1957 via the papal bull "Regnum Mariæ".
- Pope John XXIII – granted a canonical coronation on 25 March 1960 via the Archbishop of Bombay, Cardinal Valerian Gracias. The pontifical document was signed by Cardinal Domenico Tardini dated 9 January 1960 and formally notarized by the Guardian Chancellor of Apostolic Briefs, Monsignor Gildo Brugnola.
- Pope Benedict XVI – formally granted a request for audience to the first ambassador of Bahrain on 18 December 2008. He later approved the Marian title as Patroness for the Apostolic Vicariate of Arabia (which was later renamed to Apostolic Vicariate of Southern Arabia) on 5 January 2011.
- Pope Leo XIV — through the Dicastery for Divine Worship and the Discipline of the Sacraments, granted the church the dignity of "Minor basilica". The news was announced in August 2025 which makes it the first basilica in the Arabian Peninsula. The elevation rites took place on 16 January 2026, presided by Cardinal Pietro Parolin.

== Cathedral ==
The king of Bahrain, Hamad bin Isa Al Khalifa, granted the Roman Catholic community in Bahrain around 9,000 square metres of land in Awali to build a new church. The announcement of the news was formally conveyed to the Apostolic Vicar of Northern Arabia, Bishop Camillo Ballin on 11 February 2013.

The same monarch later presented a model of the proposed church structure to Pope Francis on 19 May 2014 during a private papal audience at the Apostolic Palace in Rome. Accordingly, a cathedral dedicated to the image now serves as the bishopric headquarters for the Apostolic Vicariate of Northern Arabia.
