= Catholic Church in Palau =

The Catholic Church in Palau is part of the worldwide Catholic Church, under the spiritual leadership of the Pope in Rome. According to the last census (2000) 41.6% of the population belonged to the Catholic Church. Palau belongs to the Diocese of Caroline Islands, which is itself a suffragan to the Archdiocese of Agaña (Guam).

== History ==
On April 28, 1891, Spanish Capuchin missionaries arrived to start a permanent Catholic presence on the island.

== See also ==
- Gregorio Ramarui
- Sacred Heart Church, Koror
