= Catholic Church in Kuwait =

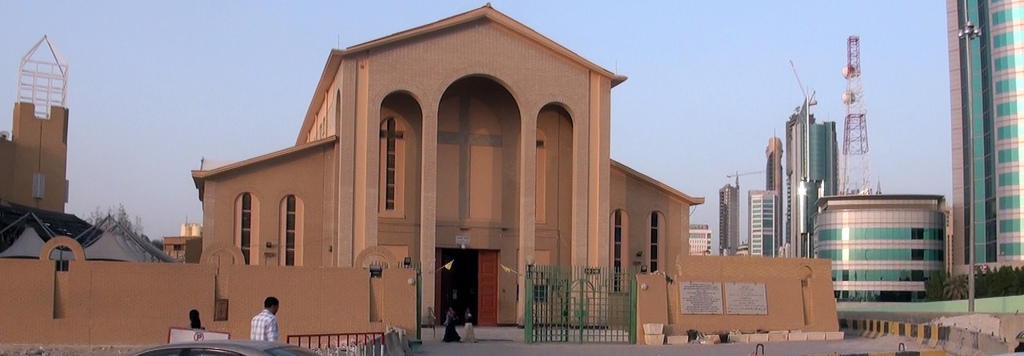
Holy Family Cathedral, Kuwait City

The Catholic Church in Kuwait is part of the worldwide Catholic Church, under the spiritual leadership of the Pope in Rome.

In 2020, Christians made up 17.93% of the population. Of these, 80% were Catholic, or approximately 560,000 people.

== Overview ==
There are no dioceses in the country, but Kuwait falls under the Apostolic Vicariate of Northern Arabia. The superior was the Italian bishop Camillo Ballin until his death on April 12, 2020.The current superior is His Excellency Bishop Aldo Berardi

There is a cathedral in Kuwait City dedicated to the Holy Family. However, this church is now a co-cathedral with the Cathedral of Our Lady of Arabia in Bahrain.

The apostolic vicariate is led by a vicar apostolic, who is usually a titular bishop. While such a territory can be classed as a particular Church, according to canon 371.1 of the Latin Code of Canon Law, a vicar apostolic's jurisdiction is an exercise of the jurisdiction of the Pope – the territory comes directly under the Pope as "local bishop", and the vicariate come directly under the jurisdiction of the Diocese of Rome, where the pope exercises this authority through a "vicar". This is unlike a diocesan bishop's jurisdiction, which is derived directly from his office.

The other parishes are St. Thérèse Parish, Salmiya, Our Lady of Arabia Parish, Ahmadi and St. Daniel Comboni Parish, Jleeb Al-Shuyoukh. In 2002, the Salesian religious order started an English language school in the country.

There are also some churches belonging to the Eastern Catholic Church: the Syro-Malankara Catholic Community, Syro-Malabar Holy Family Cathedral Parish, and the Patriarchal Vicariate of Kuwait which belongs to the Melkite Catholic Patriarchate of Antioch.

In 2020, there were 21 priests and 11 nuns working across four parishes.

== See also ==
- Religion in Kuwait
- Christianity in Kuwait
