= Sacred Heart Church, Koror =

Coordinates: 7.3451314°N 134.484837°E

Sacred Heart Church
- Sacred Heart Church
- Location: Koror
- Country: Palau
- Denomination: Roman Catholic Church

The Sacred Heart Church is the name of a religious building affiliated to the Catholic Church that is located in the main street of the city of Koror in the island and state of the same name in Palau, a country in Oceania to the west of the Pacific Ocean. Nearby is the Maris Stella School and the Etpison Museum.

The church follows the Roman or Latin rite and depends on the Diocese of the Caroline Islands (Dioecesis Carolinensium) based in Weno in the Federated States of Micronesia and which was created as a sui juris mission in 1886 and was elevated to its current status in 1979 through the bull "Tametsi Ecclesiae" of the then Pope John Paul II.

The present structure has its antecedents in the old church of the Sacred Heart (Sagrado Corazón) founded in the time of the Spanish colonization in 1892. A new structure was constructed in 1935 and it took 8 years to finish, to the inauguration attended by local parishioners and Japanese authorities.

== History ==
The present church was dedicated at Easter 1935 after almost eight years of construction. It was the only cement building in Koror apart from a few government structures, and Christians from across Palau and senior Japanese officials from Koror attended the dedication. The mission in Palau had been founded in 1891. After Japan took the islands in the First World War, it evicted the German Capuchins, later requested replacement missionaries from a neutral country, and Jesuits took over.

During the Second World War the Japanese military police ordered the Jesuits out of the mission quarters in Koror, which became a temporary barracks, and the church itself was used as barracks in the later years of the war. After the war the building was found intact apart from part of the sacristy, which a bomb had destroyed, but the bells had been taken down and the confessional, pews and statues destroyed.

== See also ==
- Roman Catholicism in Palau
- Sacred Heart Church (disambiguation)
- List of Jesuit sites
