= The Cathedral of Our Lady of Arabia =

Seat of The Apostolic Vicar of Northern Arabia

Cathedral of Our Lady of Arabia
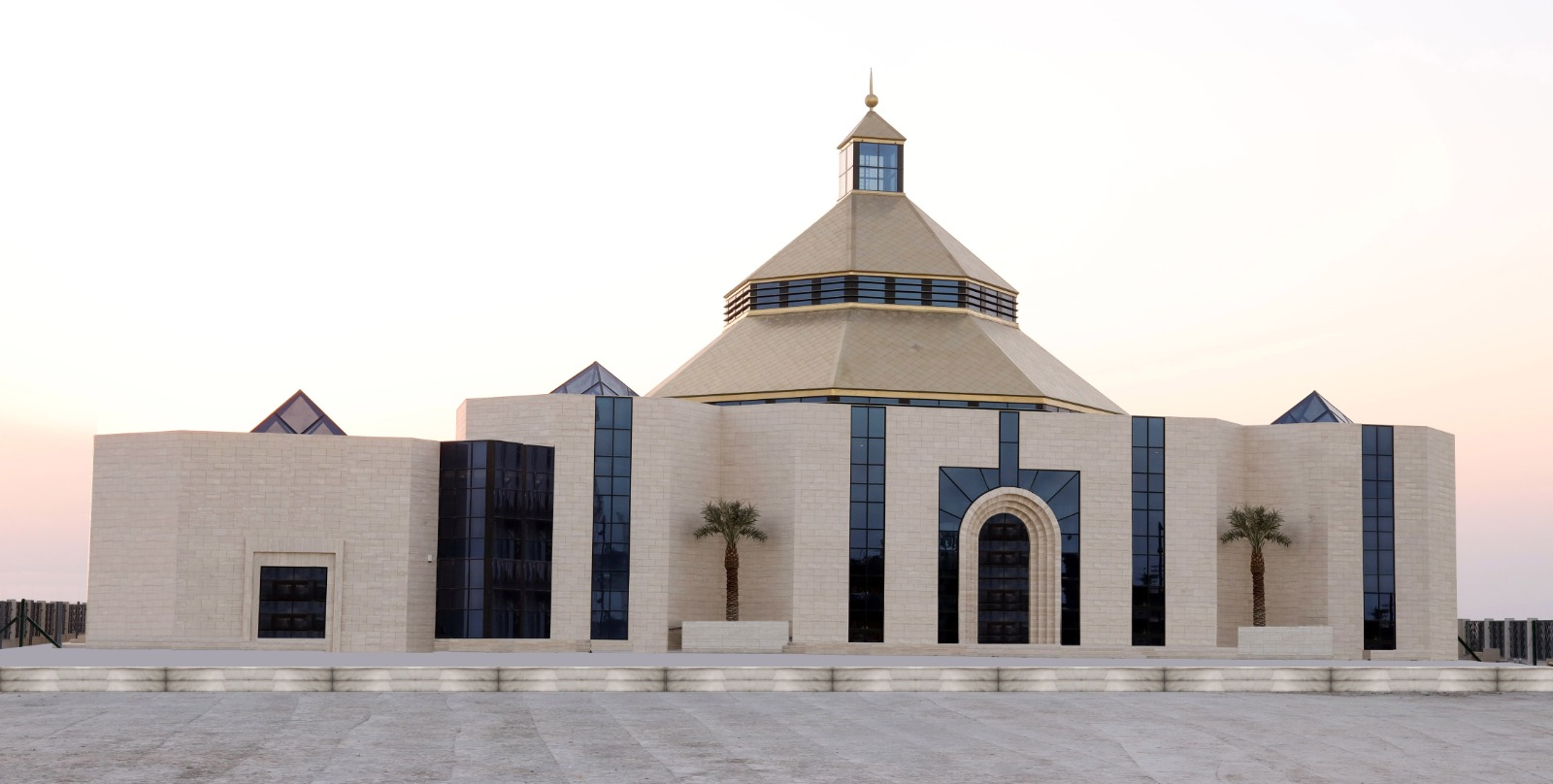
- Cathedral of Our Lady of Arabia
- 26.0789°N 50.54528°E
- Location: Awali, Bahrain
- Country: Bahrain
- Denomination: Catholic; (sui iuris: Latin Church)
- Website: www.bahraincathedral.com

History
- Status: Cathedral
- Founded: 2021; 5 years ago
- Dedication: 10 December 2021; 4 years ago

Architecture
- Functional status: Active
- Architect(s): Mattia Del Prete and Cristiano Rosponi
- Architectural type: Modern
- Groundbreaking: 31 May 2018; 8 years ago
- Completed: 5 November 2021; 4 years ago

Specifications
- Capacity: 2300

Administration
- Diocese: Apostolic Vicariate of Northern Arabia
- Deanery: Bahrain

Clergy
- Bishop(s): Most Rev. Aldo Berardi, O.SS.T.
- Rector: Rev. Fr. Saji Thomas, OFM Cap.

The Cathedral of Our Lady of Arabia is a Roman Catholic cathedral in Awali, Bahrain, dedicated to Our Lady of Arabia. It serves as the seat of the Apostolic Vicar of Northern Arabia. It was inaugurated on 9 December 2021 by His Majesty Hamad bin Isa Al Khalifa, the King of Bahrain. It is the largest Catholic church in the Arabian Peninsula.

Masses are conducted in various languages, reflecting the population of expatriates in the country, primarily English but also Arabic, Tagalog, Malayalam, and Konkani.

== History ==
Cathedral of Our Lady of Arabia at night

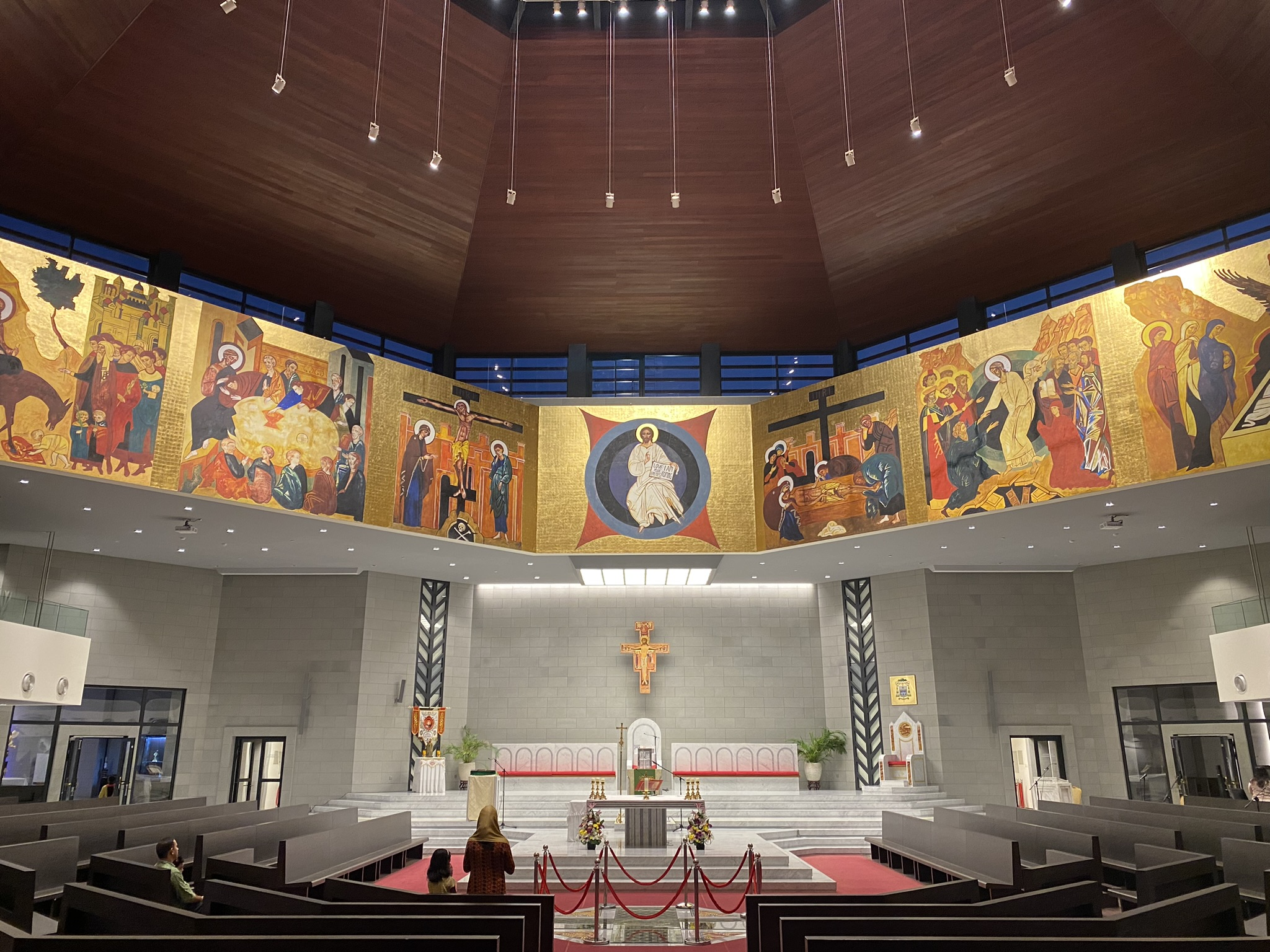
Interior of the Cathedral of Our Lady of Arabia

In a gesture of religious tolerance, on 11 February 2013, His Majesty King Hamad bin Isa bin Salman Al-Khalifa donated 9,000 square metres (97,000 sq ft) of land for the cathedral. On 19 May 2014, King Hamad bin Isa bin Salman Al-Khalifa met with Pope Francis at the Apostolic Palace in the Vatican and presented a scale model of the largest church that would be built in the Arabian Peninsula, as a symbol of the Kingdom's commitment to tolerance and coexistence.

The construction work began on 31 May 2014, after the Blessing of the Foundation Stone. The foundation stone was taken from the Holy Door of the Papal Basilica of St. Peter's in the Vatican; it was gifted to the faithful of Arabia as a sign of profound union with the See of Rome. The ground-breaking ceremony was held on 10 June 2018, in the presence of the Vicar Apostolic, Camillo Ballin; the Papal Nuncio, Francisco Padilla; and officials of the Kingdom of Bahrain. Following the death of Monsignor Ballin on 12 April 2020, the construction was overseen by Msgr. Paul Hinder, whom Pope Francis appointed as the Apostolic Administrator of Northern Arabia.

The design of the cathedral was created by the Italian designer and architect Mattia Del Prete and Cristiano Rosponi. Its shape resembles that of a tent, alluding to the "tent of meeting" or tabernacle in which the presence of God was manifested to the prophet Moses as described in the Old Testament. (Note: For an example of biblical texts mentioning this, see Book of Exodus 33:7-11.) The cathedral has a seating capacity of 2300, with two chapels and two large rooms with cubicles for confessions. The roof of the cathedral has an octagonal dome.

In one of the chapels is revealed the patroness of the Apostolic Vicariate of Northern Arabia, "Our Lady of Arabia" – the Virgin Mary seated on a throne with a crown on her head, holding the infant Jesus in her right hand and the rosary in her left hand. The "mystery crown artworks" in the cathedral are the masterpiece of Kiko Argüello.

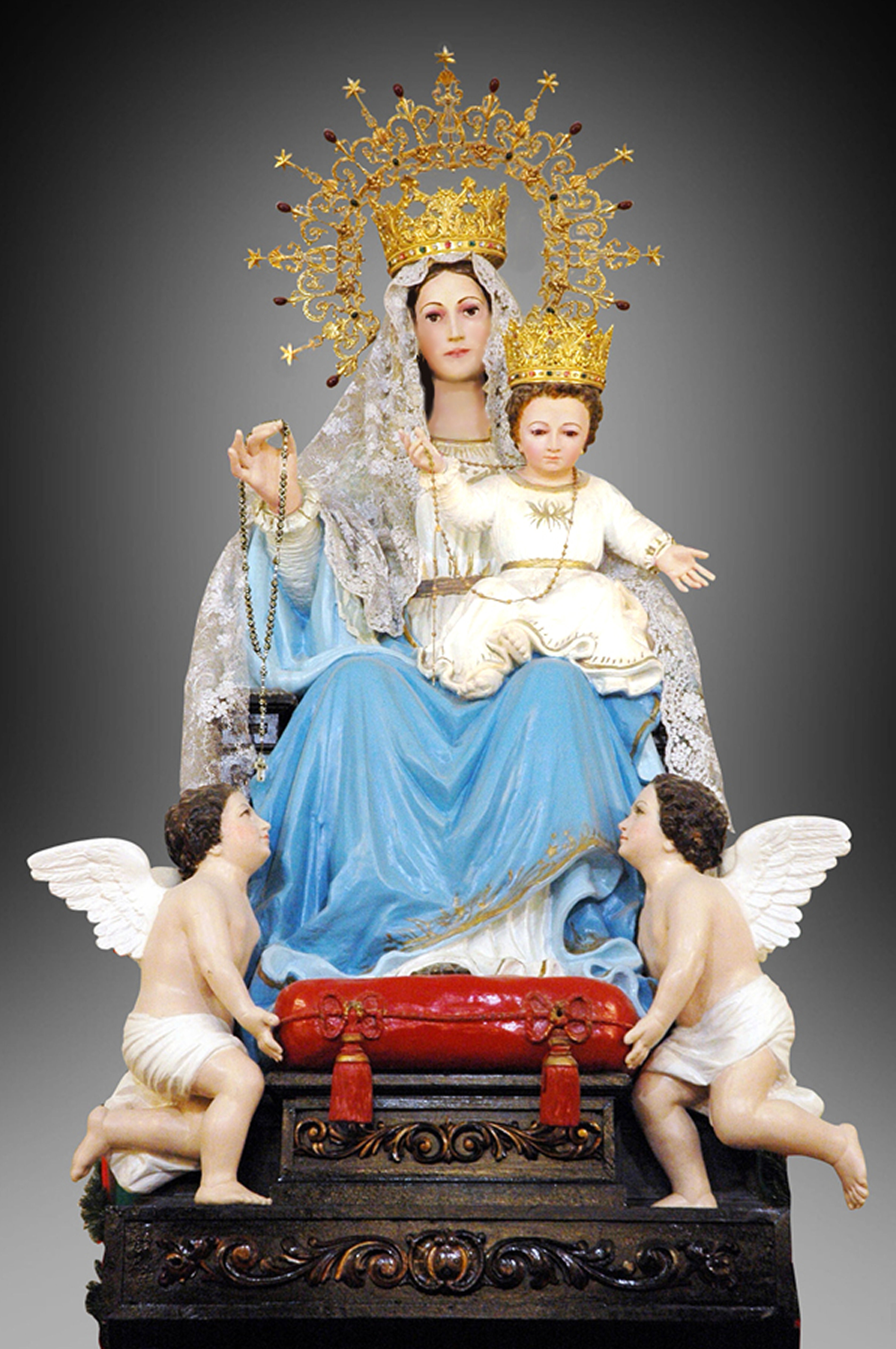
Our Lady of Arabia Statue

The cathedral was inaugurated on the morning of Thursday, 9 December 2021. The ceremony was attended by Sheikh Abdullah bin Hamad Al Khalifa, who represented the King of Bahrain, Hamad bin Isa Al Khalifa. Also in attendance were Msgr. Paul Hinder, the Apostolic Administrator of Northern Arabia; Msgr. Eugene Nugent, the Apostolic Nuncio in Bahrain, Kuwait, and Qatar; and Cardinal Luis Antonio Tagle, the Prefect of the Congregation for the Evangelization of Peoples. The next day, on 10 December 2021, Cardinal Tagle presided over the liturgy for the consecration of the place of worship along with Monsignors Nugent and Hinder.

== Papal visit ==
On 4 November 2022, Pope Francis made a historic visit to the Cathedral of Our Lady of Arabia in Bahrain. During his visit, the Pope expressed his gratitude to the people of Bahrain for their care for the country's Catholic community. He also addressed the issue of unity in diversity within the Christian community and emphasized the importance of praise and worship in bringing Christians together.

The Pope's visit to the Cathedral of Our Lady of Arabia was significant for several reasons. It was the first time a Pope had visited Bahrain. The visit also served as a symbol of the Catholic Church's commitment to interfaith dialogue and its desire to promote greater unity within the Christian community.

== Controversies ==
The planned construction of the largest Roman Catholic church in the Gulf was intended to demonstrate Bahrain's traditions of religious tolerance in a region where churches face significant limitations. However, it has become another point of tension in a country already of divided Muslim communities. Hardline clerics have opposed the construction of the church complex.

Over 70 clerics signed a petition stating that building churches in the Arabian Peninsula was forbidden. The government ordered the transfer of a prominent cleric, Sheikh Adel Hassan al-Hamad, out of his mosque in response to his opposition, but protests by his supporters forced the government to cancel the order.

More than 50 people have died and hundreds have been detained in nearly 19 months of unrest in the country. The Vatican plans to carve out a new apostolic district covering Kuwait, Bahrain, Qatar, and Saudi Arabia. The new administrative headquarters are expected to shift from Kuwait to Bahrain. Bahrain has a unique tradition of tolerance among different religions, sects, and races, with native Christian, Jewish, and Hindu communities.
