= Catholic Church and Islam =

Relations between the Catholic Church and Islam deals with the current attitude of the Catholic Church towards Islam, as well as the attitude of Islam towards the Catholic Church and Catholics, and notable changes in the relationship since the 20th century.

In the 7th century text Concerning Heresy, Saint John of Damascus named Islam as Christological heresy, referring to it as the "heresy of the Ishmaelites" (see medieval Christian views on Muhammad). The position remained popular in Christian circles well into the 20th century, with Hilaire Belloc terming it "the great and enduring heresy of Mohammed."

Since the 20th century, the Catholic church has engaged in interreligious dialogue with the various confessions in Islam.

== Medieval ==
Due to geographical proximity, most of the early Christian critiques of Islam were associated with Eastern Christians. The Quran was not translated from Arabic into the Latin language until the 12th century, when the English Catholic priest Robert of Ketton made the Lex Mahumet pseudoprophete translation (Robert was active in the Diocese of Pamplona, not far removed from the Arabic-speakers in the Iberian Peninsula). This translation was made at the behest of Peter the Venerable, while he was at the Benedictine Cluny Abbey in France, as part of a project to refute its teachings and aid in the conversion of Muslims to Catholic Christianity. The text describes Muhammed as a precursor to the Antichrist and the successor of Arius, a famous Christian heretic. This remained the standard document in the Catholic West until a more complete translation and critique was completed by Fr. Ludovico Maracci in 1698. Cardinal Nicholas of Cusa in the interim authored Cribatio Alcorani (Critical Study of the Quran) during the 1460s under the reign of Pope Pius II, at a time when tensions with the Ottoman Empire were heightened and Pope Pius II wrote Mehmed II a letter, attempting to convince him to convert to the Catholic faith.

== Modern Period ==
In the 20th century the attitude of the Catholic Church started to change in the aftermath of World War II and there was a stronger interest in exchange and dialogue. This was sparked among other factors by influential personalities such as the mystic and desert explorer Charles de Foucauld who promoted respect for the Muslim religion Christian-Muslim dialogue and the common living together with Muslims. The International Meetings at the monastery of Toumliline, held between 1956 and 1964, provided a platform for intellectuals as well as Christian, Jewish and Muslim scholars to speak about contemporary issues as well as about faith. At the same time, the AIM (Aid for Implementation of Monasticism) under Benedictine Cornelius Thomsen promoted the interaction of their monks with people of all races and religions and thus opening ways of dialogue.

=== Second Vatican Council ===
The question of Islam was not on the agenda when Nostra aetate was first drafted, or at the opening of the Second Vatican Council. The document was originally intended to be just about Rabbinic Judaism but as the Council was underway become a statement on Non-Christian religions. Due to the ongoing Arab–Israeli conflict, the document garnered the political attention of several Arab, majority Muslim countries such as Egypt, Lebanon, Syria and Iraq. The Arab lobby, led by Egypt, often acted in concert with Eastern Catholics and conservative Latin Church Catholics who wanted the document to be pulled from the council, accusing it of being part of a Zionist conspiracy. Their opponents included the American Jewish lobby, including the American Jewish Committee, B'nai B'rith and the World Jewish Congress, who had the collaboration of most American Cardinals and liberal Latin Church Catholics. By the time of the Second Session of the Council in 1963 reservations began to be raised by bishops of the Middle East about the inclusion of the Jewish issue question. The position was taken that either the question will not be raised at all, or if it were raised, some mention of the Muslims should be made. Melkite patriarch Maximos IV was among those pushing for this latter position.

Early in 1964 Cardinal Bea notified Cardinal Cicognani, President of the Council's Coordinating Commission, that the Council fathers wanted the Council to say something about the monotheistic religions, and in particular about Islam. The subject, however, was deemed to be outside the competence of Bea's Secretariat for the Promotion of Christian Unity. Bea expressed willingness to "select some competent people and with them to draw up a draft" to be presented to the Coordinating Commission. At a meeting of the Coordinating Commission on 16–17 April, Cicognani acknowledged that it would be necessary to speak of the Muslims.

The period between the first and second sessions saw the change of pontiff from Pope John XXIII to Pope Paul VI, who had been a member of the circle (the Badaliya) of the Islamologist Louis Massignon. Pope Paul VI referred to Muslims in August 1964 as "worshippers of the One God" who should be admired "for all that is good and true" in their worship, and chose to follow the path recommended by Maximos IV. He therefore established commissions to introduce what would become paragraphs on the Muslims in two different documents, one of them being Nostra aetate, paragraph three, the other being Lumen gentium, paragraph 16: both statements are very similar and overlap, although the reference to Islam in the latter is shorter:

"... the Muslims, who, professing to hold the faith of Abraham, along with us adore the one and merciful God, who on the last day will judge mankind".

The text of the final draft of Nostra aetate bore traces of Massignon's influence. The reference to Mary, for example, resulted from the intervention of Joseph Emmanuel Descuffi, the Latin archbishop of Smyrna, with whom Massignon collaborated in reviving the cult of Mary at Smyrna. The commendation of Muslim prayer may reflect the influence of the Badaliya. In Lumen gentium, the Second Vatican Council declares that the plan of salvation also includes Muslims, due to their professed monotheism.

=== Recent dialogue ===
Though there are no monks in Islam, the DIMMID (Dialogue Interreligieux Monastique - Monastic Interreligious Dialogue) has been actively promoting spiritual exchange with both Shia and Sunni Muslims. As such, the first international monastic/Muslim dialogue was organised in 2011 by the DIMMID in Sant’Anselmo, attended among others by Iranian scholar Mohammad Ali Shomali.

== See also ==
- List of converts to Catholicism from Islam
- Catholic Church in the Middle East
- Catholic Church and Judaism
- Christianity and Judaism
- Christianity and Islam
