= Al Ahmadi =

Al Ahmadi may refer to:

- Ahmadi, followers of the Ahmadiyya sect in Islam
- Al Ahmadi District
- Al Ahmadi Governorate
- Al Ahmadi, Kuwait, suburb of Kuwait City, located in Al Ahmadi Governorate
