= Sacred Heart Church, Manama =

Roman Catholic church in Bahrain

Coordinates: 26°13′39″N 50°34′47″E

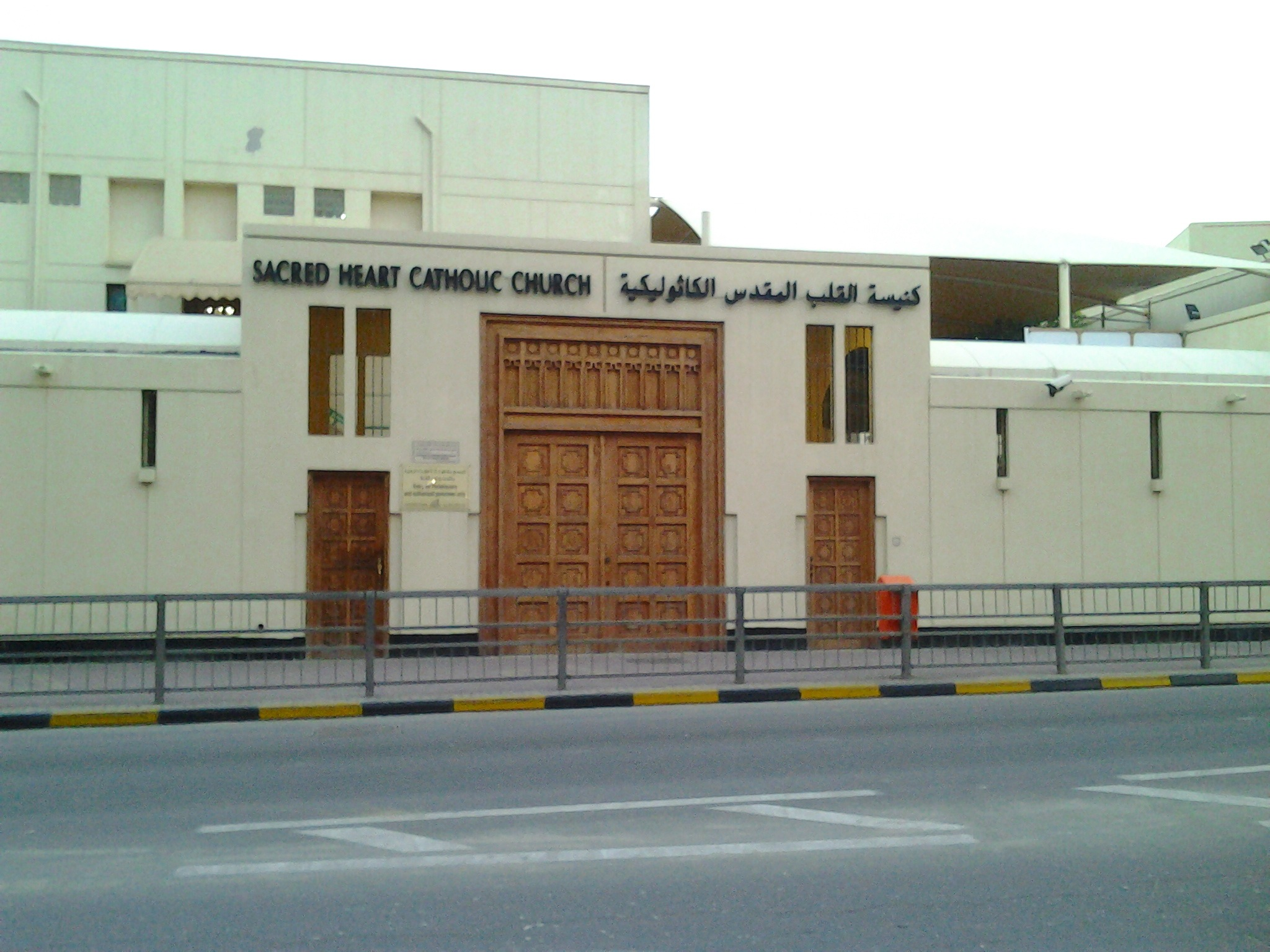
Exterior/main entrance door of the church.

The Sacred Heart Church (Arabic: كنيسة القلب المقدس) is a Roman Catholic parish in Manama, Bahrain. The church is one of only two Roman Catholic churches in Bahrain (the other being the Cathedral of Our Lady of Arabia in Awali). The Sacred Heart Church serves an estimated 140,000 people. The Parish Priest is Rev.Fr. Francis Joseph Padavupurackal OFM Cap.

== History ==
In January, 1938 or 1939, Giovanni Tirinanzi, Apostolic Vicar of Arabia, then based in Aden, came to Bahrain to meet the Emir of Bahrain, Sheikh Hamad Bin Isa Al Khalifa, with plans to build a church in Bahrain. The foundation stone for the new church was laid on June 9, 1939. Father Luigi Magliacani, whom Tirinnanzi knew as an expert in the building of churches, was called to Bahrain and given the responsibility of building the church. In just six months, the church, the priests' residence, and the Sacred Heart School, were built.

The first mass, a Christmas midnight mass, was held in the new church. It was formally consecrated on March 3, 1940. The parish was the first Catholic church in the Persian Gulf.

The Comboni Missionary Sisters arrived in May 1953 and were given the role of maintaining the school. The school is now run by the Apostolic Carmelite Sisters.

As economy in the Persian Gulf region grew due to the discovery of oil reserves, more Catholic migrant workers arrived in Bahrain. To cater to their needs, Saint Barth's Hall was built in 1958 to provide a place for social gatherings and to house the clergy.

Through the next 30 years, the number of Catholics grew in the region, mainly expatriates and migrant workers from South and Southeast Asia. The parish underwent major expansion under the leadership of Fr. Felicio Diniz, with the construction of the main church building in 1990. Other major developments include the building of the parish community center and the Third Millennium building.

== Current status ==
The church caters mainly to the large expatriate population in Bahrain. Many parishioners have nationalities from India, the Philippines, Pakistan, Bangladesh, Sri Lanka and Arabs (mostly from Lebanon but also from Palestine and Syria). Services are conducted primarily in English, although there are services conducted in French, Spanish, Arabic, Malayalam, Tamil, Konkani, Filipino, Telugu, and Sinhala.

The church also hosts a number of communal activities, the most famous of which is the Family Day festival which occurs in the first week of February every year.

== See also ==
- Roman Catholicism in Bahrain
- Christianity in Bahrain
