= Ubaldo Teofano Stella =

Emeritus Roman Catholic Bishop

His Excellency, The Most Reverend Ubaldo Teofano Stella O.C.D.
- Emeritus Vicar Apostolic of Kuwait
- Church: Catholic Church
- Diocese: Antaeopolis
- See: Apostolic Vicariate of Kuwait
- In office: 1955 to 1966
- Successor: Victor León Esteban San Miguel y Erce, O.C.D.

Orders
- Ordination: 28 October 1932
- Consecration: 4 June 1955 by Giovanni Battista Montini

Personal details
- Born: Ubaldo Teofano Stella; July 14, 1910 Cassano d'Adda, Italy
- Died: November 9, 1978 (aged 68)
- Denomination: Catholic

Ubaldo Teofano Stella (14 July 1910 – 9 November 1978) was an Italian Catholic bishop and missionary who served as the Apostolic Vicar of Kuwait from 1955 to 1966. He was also the Titular Bishop of Antaeopolis.

== Life ==
=== Early life and priestly formation ===
Teofano Ubaldo Stella was born in Cassano d'Adda, in the province of Milan, on 14 July 1910. He felt the vocation to the priesthood at a very young age and for this reason he entered the seminary where his father, a railwayman, had moved for when he was still a child. In 1925, when his father was assigned to Milan-Turin and took up permanent residence in Boffalora sopra Ticino, Teofano entered the Monza seminary where he completed his studies, deciding to enter the Discalced Carmelite Order. On 5 October 1927 he made his solemn vows in the convent of Concesa.

=== Priestly ministry and missionary work ===
On October 28, 1932, he was ordained a priest. He was then sent to Piacenza where he became a teacher in a school of the order. From 1936 to 1940 he served as a military chaplain. Shortly afterwards he left as a missionary for India, where he remained from 1940 to 1946, also spending several years in British concentration camps. Returning to Italy he did not stop his vocation to evangelization and left for the Middle East where in 1948 he founded the mission in Kuwait.

=== Episcopal ministry ===
On June 4, 1955, Pope Pius XII appointed Stella as the Titular Bishop of Antaeopolis and the Apostolic Vicar of Kuwait. He received his episcopal consecration on October 3, 1955, in the cathedral of Milan from the Metropolitan Archbishop of Milan, Giovanni Battista Montini. Co-consecrators included the Bishop of Lodi, Tarcisio Vincenzo Benedetti, and the Bishop of Trivandrum, Vincent Victor Dereere, both of the Carmelite order.

Stella began construction of the Cathedral of the Holy Family in the Desert in Kuwait City, blessing its foundation stone in 1957 and consecrating it upon its completion four years later on March 16, 1961.

From 1962 to 1965, he was one of the conciliar fathers of the Second Vatican Council, taking part in all four sessions.

=== Resignation and death ===
In March 1966, Pope Paul VI accepted Stella's resignation from the pastoral government of the vicariate and he returned to Milan. In 1974, he attempted to go on a mission to Texas, but due to his advanced age and frequent illnesses, he decided to stay permanently in Milan and dedicated himself to preaching there.

Stella died in Milan on November 9, 1978, at the age of 68. After his funeral, his body was buried in the cemetery of Boffalora sopra Ticino.

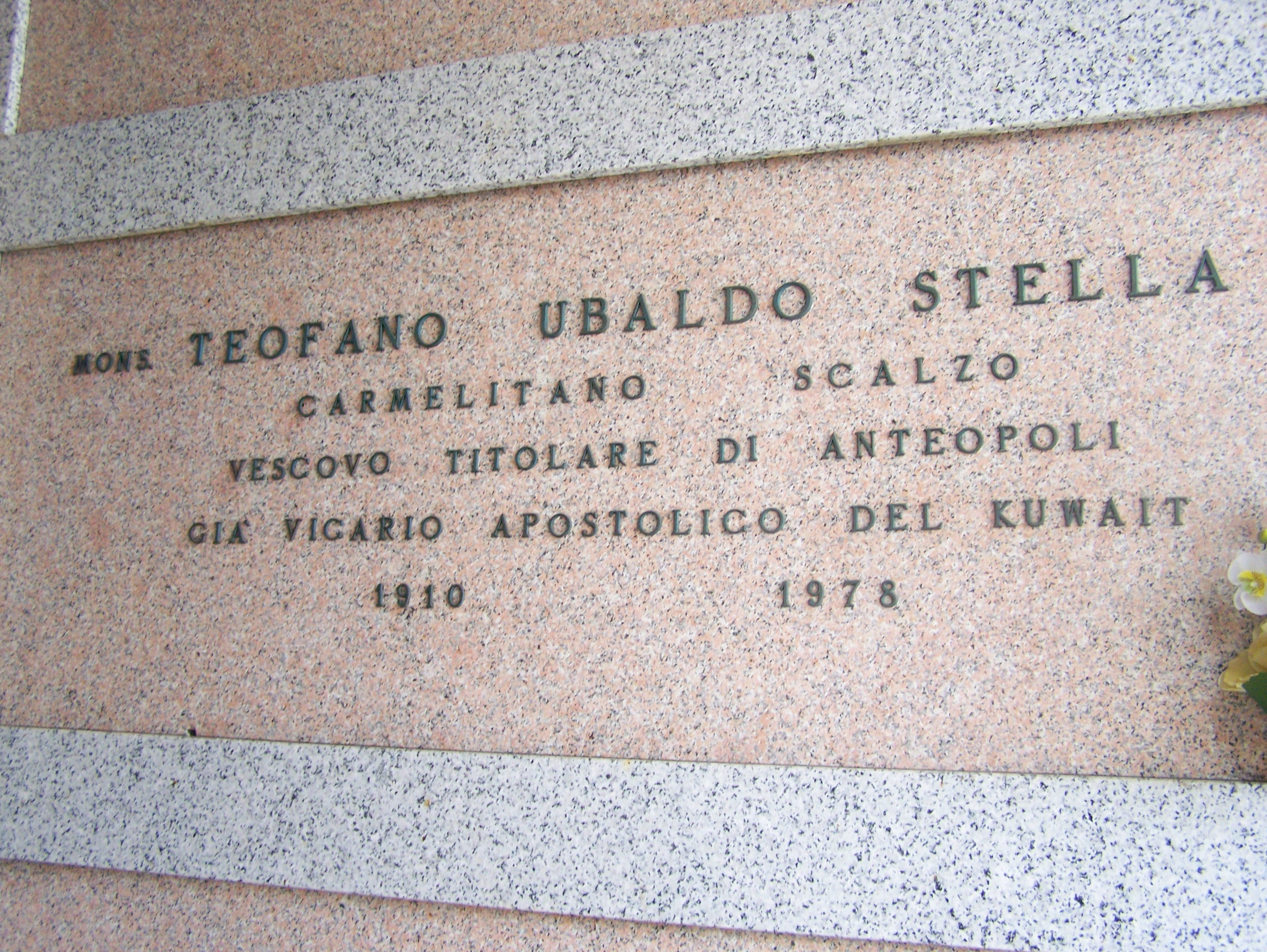
Tomb in Milan

== Legacy ==
Stella is remembered for founding the mission in Kuwait. He is also known for his role in the construction of the Cathedral of the Holy Family in the Desert in Kuwait City, which still stands as a testament to his contributions.

In addition, the Kuwaiti postal service issued a commemorative stamp in his honor in 1965.

Catholic Church titles
Preceded by Position Established	Apostolic Vicar of Kuwait; 1955 to 1966	Succeeded by Victor León Esteban San Miguel y Erce, O.C.D.
