= Gregorio Ramarui =

Palauan priest

Gregorio Ramarui was the first native Palauan to be ordained a priest in the Roman Catholic Church.

In February 1964, Ramarui was ordained a priest in Koror, Palau. His ordination was attended by Roman Catholic leaders from as far away as Pohnpei.

Ramarui left the Roman Catholic priesthood two years after his ordination.
