= Aldo Berardi =

French Catholic Trinitarian friar and bishop

The Most Reverend Aldo Berardi, O.Ss.T.
- Apostolic Vicar of Northern Arabia
- See: Apostolic Vicariate of Northern Arabia
- Appointed: 28 January 2023
- Predecessor: Camillo Ballin, M.C.C.J.
- Previous post: Vicar General of the Order of the Holy Trinity for the Redemption of Captives

Orders
- Ordination: 20 July 1991
- Consecration: 18 March 2023 by Cardinal Miguel Ángel Ayuso Guixot

Personal details
- Born: September 30, 1963 (age 63) Longeville-lès-Metz, Moselle, France
- Denomination: Catholic
- Motto: Latin: Resurrexit Sicut Dixit (He has risen as He said)
- Coat of arms

Ordination history of Aldo Berardi
History
Priestly ordination
- Ordained by: Jean-Samuel Raobelina, M.S.
- Date: 20 July 1991
Episcopal consecration
- Principal consecrator: Miguel Ángel Ayuso Guixot, M.C.C.J.
- Co-consecrators: Eugene Nugent; Paul Hinder, O.F.M. Cap.
- Date: 18 March 2023

Styles of Aldo Berardi
- Reference style: His Excellency; The Most Reverend
- Spoken style: Your Excellency
- Religious style: Bishop or Monsignor

Aldo Berardi, O.Ss.T. (born 30 September 1963) is a French Catholic Trinitarian friar and bishop. He is the vicar apostolic of the Apostolic Vicariate of Northern Arabia. On 28 January 2023, Berardi was appointed Vicar Apostolic of the Vicariate Apostolic of Northern Arabia. He previously served as the vicar general of the Order of the Most Holy Trinity for the Redemption of Captives, commonly known as the Trinitarian friars.

== Life ==
Berardi was born in Longeville-lès-Metz, France, on September 30, 1963.

In 1979, he entered the Foyer-Séminaire in Montigny-lès-Metz and attended George de la Tour High School in Metz. From 1982 to 1984, he studied Philosophy at the Major Seminary of Villers-lès-Nancy. He then served in his civil service in Madagascar from 1984 to 1986, where he held positions as a French teacher, librarian, and cultural officer.

In 1986, Berardi entered the novitiate of the Trinitarian Order in Cerfoid, France, and made his first religious profession in 1987. He then studied Theology at the Major Seminary of Montreal from 1987 to 1990, and made his perpetual profession in Rome, Italy, in December 1990. He was ordained a priest in Ars-sur-Moselle, France, on July 20, 1991.

From 1990 to 1992, Berardi attended the Accademia Alfonsiana in Rome and obtained a Licentiate in Moral Theology. During this time, he also served at Caritas Rome. He then served as director of a Spirituality Centre in Cerfoid from 1992 to 1998, and held various positions such as parochial vicar, school chaplain, chaplain of a psychiatric hospital, Boy Scout assistant, and Catholic Action assistant.

From 2000 to 2006, Berardi directed the Centre Sainte Bakhita in Cairo, which sheltered Sudanese refugees. He served in the Sacred Heart Parish in Manama, Bahrain, from 2007 to 2010 and was Provincial Counsellor for his Congregation from 2009 to 2012. From 2011 to 2019, he returned to the Apostolic Vicariate of Northern Arabia, serving as Parish Priest and Episcopal Vicar.

From 2019 to 2023, Berardi served as Vicar General of the Order of the Holy Trinity for the Redemption of Captives, President of the General Secretariat of Formation, and Legal Representative of the Congregation’s Generalate. On January 28, 2023, Pope Francis appointed Berardi as the new Apostolic Vicar of the Apostolic Vicariate of Northern Arabia, succeeding Camillo Ballin, MCCJ, who died on April 12, 2020.

He was ordained on 18 March 2023 at Our Lady of Arabia Cathedral, Bahrain by Cardinal Miguel Angel Ayuso Guixot, Prefect of the Dicastery for Interreligious Dialogue.

== See also ==
- First message
- Episcopal ordination

Catholic Church titles
Preceded by Paul Hinder (as Apostolic Administrator)	Apostolic Vicar of Northern Arabia; 28 January 2023 to Present	Incumbent
