= Holy Family Co-Cathedral, Kuwait =

Cathedral in Kuwait City

Coordinates: 29.36363367°N 47.95997854°E

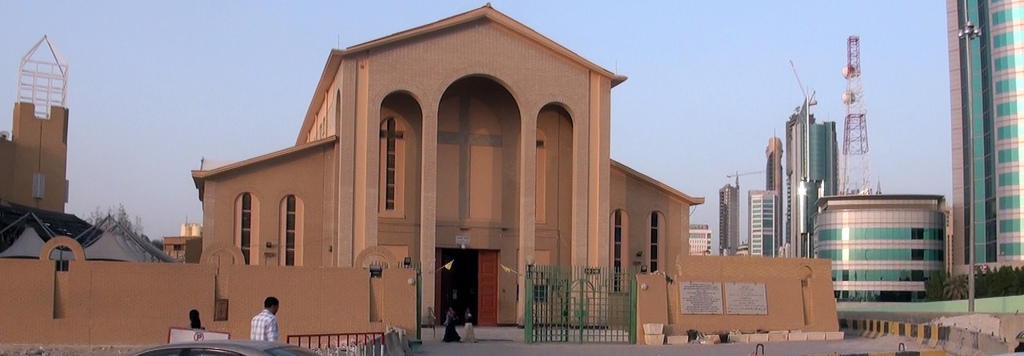
Holy Family Cathedral, Kuwait City.

Holy Family Co-Cathedral, formerly known as Holy Family Cathedral, is a Catholic co-cathedral in Kuwait City. The church is situated in the east side of Kuwait City, in the Qibla area. The land was donated by the government of Kuwait. Architect Emilio Tenca designed the cathedral, The first stone was laid on January 27, 1957, and the cathedral was consecrated on March 16, 1961.

The church contains a statue of Our Lady of Arabia, a smaller replica of the 1949 cedar statue enshrined at the Catholic church in Ahmadi, Kuwait.

== Overview ==
Until recently, the Holy Family Cathedral was the seat of the bishop of the Apostolic Vicariate of Northern Arabia. However, with the construction of the Cathedral of Our Lady of Arabia in Bahrain, the Holy Family Cathedral was renamed Holy Family Co-Cathedral. In order to satisfy the 140,000 Catholics residing in Kuwait, Mass is held at the Cathedral throughout the week in multiple languages, including, English, Arabic (Maronite, Coptic and Latin), Tagalog, Sinhala, Malayalam (Syro Malabar, Syro Malankara and Latin), Tamil, Konkani and Spanish. In availability of priests, holy Mass is also celebrated in Bengali, Hindi and Korean. Sunday is a weekday in Kuwait. Hence, Friday, the Muslim prayer day, is a weekend. Therefore, Sunday Masses of the following week are given in advance on the Friday or Saturday of the previous week. Currently, there are eight priests at the Holy Family Cathedral. Catechism classes are also offered at the Cathedral, preparing children and teenagers for their Baptism, First Communion and Confirmation. Additionally, Marriage preparation courses are also offered at the Parish.
