= Camillo Ballin =

Italian Catholic missionary bishop (1944–2020)

The Most Reverend Camillo Ballin, M.C.C.J.
- Apostolic Vicar of Northern Arabia
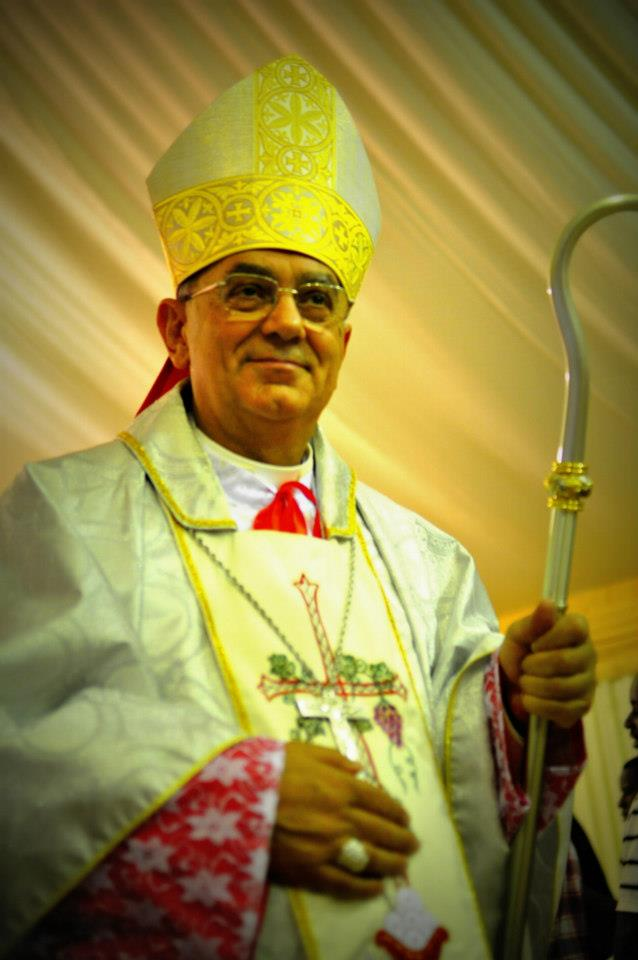
- Church: Catholic Church
- Diocese: Apostolic Vicariate of Northern Arabia
- In office: 2005 to 2020
- Predecessor: Francis George Adeodatus Micallef, O.C.D.
- Successor: Aldo Berardi, O.Ss.T.
- Previous post: Apostolic Vicar of Kuwait

Orders
- Ordination: 30 March 1969
- Consecration: 2 October 2005 by Crescenzio Sepe

Personal details
- Born: 24 June 1944 Padua, Veneto, Italy
- Died: 12 April 2020 (aged 75) Rome, Italy
- Citizenship: Italian & Bahraini
- Denomination: Catholic
- Residence: Bishop's House, Awali Bahrain
- Motto: In verbo tuo (In Your Word)
- Coat of arms

Camillo Ballin, M.C.C.J. (June 24, 1944 – April 12, 2020) was an Italian Catholic member of the Comboni Missionaries and bishop, writer and educator who was the Vicar Apostolic of the Apostolic Vicariate of Northern Arabia.

== Family and early life ==
Camillo Ballin, son of Lucia and Angelo Ballin, was born in Fontaniva, Italy on June 24, 1944. He died on 12 April 2020.

== Career ==
Ballin was ordained Priest of the Comboni Missionaries of the Heart of Jesus on March 30, 1969.

Ballin began his priestly apostle in St. Joseph parish in Cairo in 1971, and then he served as Parish Priest from 1972 to 1977. From 1977 to 1980, Ballin was located first in Kaslik, in Lebanon, and then Pontificio Instituto Orientale, in Rome, for his Licentiate in Oriental liturgy. He was a professor at the Institute of Theology in Cairo from 1981 to 1990.

In 1990, Ballin moved to Sudan and founded a training institute for religion teachers. From 1997 to 2000, Ballin returned to Rome for his doctorate on the Church history. In 2000, he was appointed Director of the Dar Comboni Center of Arab and Islamic Studies in Cairo, Egypt.

On July 14, 2005, Pope Benedict XVI appointed Ballin as the Vicar Apostolic of Kuwait.

=== Publications ===
In 2004, Ballin published "The Ways of the Spirit" and "History of the Church" in Arabic.

=== Catholic Unity Congress ===
The Catholic Unity Congress was established in 2008 by the Pastoral Council at the Holy Family Cathedral in Kuwait City and led by Ballin as the head of the Catholic Church in Kuwait. The mission of the conference is to increase awareness that all Catholic groups "are one and united with the Lord."

== Later life ==
Ballin resided in Awali in the Kingdom of Bahrain at the Persian Gulf.

== Death ==
Ballin died in Rome in the evening of Easter Sunday (12 April 2020). He was undergoing treatment in Rome at the Gemelli Polyclinic since the last two months following diagnosis with lung cancer. During this period, the bishops of the Latin Conference of the Arab Regions (CELRA) were able to visit him and spend a few moments with him as they convened in Rome from 17–20 February 2020 for their 70th Plenary assembly.

Catholic Church titles
Preceded by Francis George Adeodatus Micallef, OCD	Apostolic Vicar of Kuwait; 14 July 14 2005 to 31 May 2011	Succeeded by Position Dissolved
Preceded by Position Established	Apostolic Vicar of Northern Arabia; 31 May 2011 to 12 April 2020	Succeeded by Paul Hinder, OFMCap (as Apostolic Administrator); Aldo Berardi, OSsT (as Apostolic Vicar)
