= Awali =

Municipality in Bahrain

Coordinates: 26°05′04″N 50°33′02″E

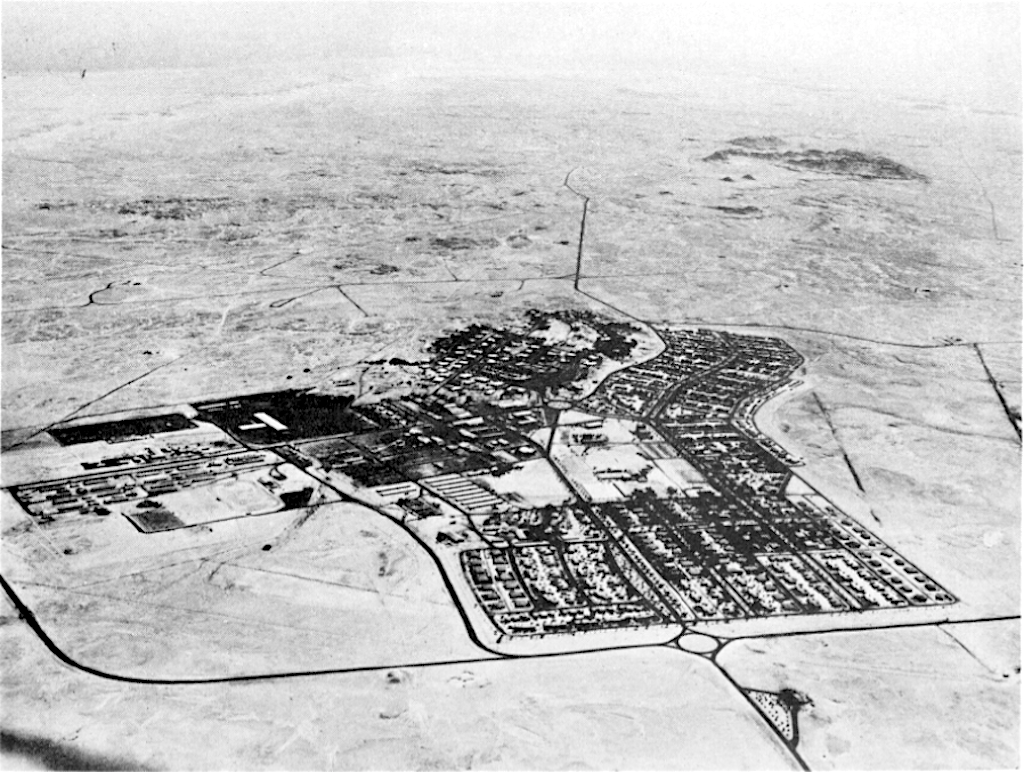
An overhead shot of Awali in 1959.

Awali is a small municipality located approximately in the centre of the Kingdom of Bahrain, a small island in the Persian Gulf. Founded in the 1930s by the Bahrain Petroleum Company, it is populated mostly by workers of various nationalities from around the world whose skills were needed in the setting up and running of the refinery at Sitrah. To its north are Bahrain's oil refinery and to its south are the oil wells and the desert area of Sakhir. It has a population of 1769 citizens.
