= Catholic Church in the United Arab Emirates =

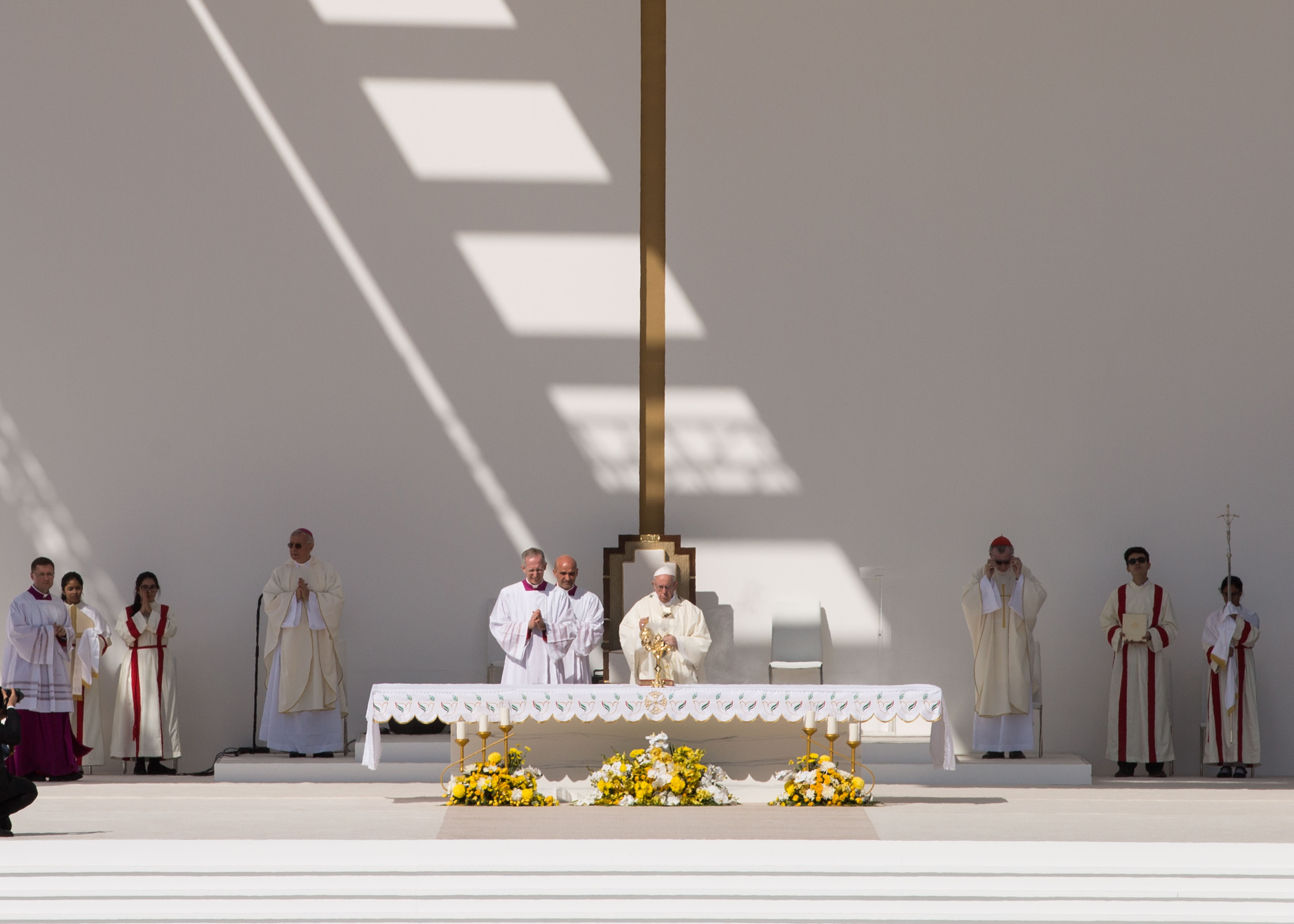
Pope Francis leading a Papal Mass in Abu Dhabi at Zayed Sports City Stadium for 135,000 Catholics in 2019.

The Catholic Church in the United Arab Emirates is part of the worldwide Catholic Church, under the spiritual leadership of the Pope in Rome.

In 2020 there were nearly 850,000 expatriates in the UAE who are Catholics, representing almost 9% of the total population, largely from the Philippines, India, South America, Lebanon, Africa, Germany, Italy, Ukraine, Portugal, Spain, France and other parts of Europe, Pakistan, Bangladesh and Sri Lanka.

The UAE forms part of the Apostolic Vicariate of Southern Arabia. The seat of the vicariate is in St. Joseph's Cathedral, Abu Dhabi. The Apostolic Vicar is Bishop Paolo Martinelli.

== History ==
In June 2016, Pope Francis received and accepted an invitation to visit the UAE. On 6 December 2018, it was confirmed that the pope would visit the UAE to participate in the International Interfaith Meeting on "Human Fraternity" in Abu Dhabi.

=== 2019 Papal visit ===
On 3 February 2019, Pope Francis landed in Abu Dhabi and was greeted by Sheikh Mohammed bin Zayed Al Nahyan, Crown Prince of Abu Dhabi and Deputy Supreme Commander of the UAE Armed Forces and then Ahmad al-Tayyeb, Grand Imam of Al Azhar University, which serves as the lead source for Sunni Islam education and Chairman of the Muslim Council of Elders. The visit was the first papal visit to an area in the Arabian Peninsula.

On 4 February, the Pope attended the Interfaith Meeting, during which he and Al-Tayyeb signed “A Document on Human Fraternity for World Peace and Living Together". The same day, the Pope spoke at the Abu Dhabi Founder's Memorial, held a meeting with Al-Tayyeb and other Muslim elders at the Sheikh Zayed Grand Mosque, and held a meeting with Crown Prince Sheikh Mohammed bin Zayed Al Nahyan at the Presidential Palace.

On 5 February 2019, Pope Francis concluded his trip after giving a mass in front of a large crowd, estimated at 135,000, at Zayed Sports City. Elements of the 90-minute service were conducted in Italian, English, Arabic, Tagalog, Urdu, Malayalam, Konkani and Korean. The Papal Mass was attended by nearly 20% of the estimated one million Catholics living and working in the UAE. The papal mass in Abu Dhabi was historic not only for being the first one in the Gulf region but also for the unique diversity of the participants.

== Churches in the UAE ==
In 2023 there are 10 Catholic churches in the UAE:

- St. Joseph's Cathedral, Abu Dhabi
- St. Mary's Catholic Church, Dubai
- St. Francis of Assisi Catholic Church, Jebel Ali
- St. Michael's Catholic Church, Sharjah
- St. Mary's Catholic Church, Al Ain
- St. Paul's Catholic Church, Abu Dhabi
- St. Anthony of Padua Church, Ras Al Khaimah
- Our Lady of Perpetual Help Catholic Church, Fujairah
- St. John the Baptist Catholic Church, Ruwais
- St. Francis Church, Abu Dhabi (opened in February 2023)
- Sub Centres in Kalba, Khorfakkan, Dibba and Madinat Zayed.

== See also ==
- Christianity in the United Arab Emirates
- Protestantism in the United Arab Emirates
- Apostolic Nunciature to United Arab Emirates
