= Christianity in the United Arab Emirates =

Christians in the United Arab Emirates account for 12.9% of the total population according to 2020 estimates.

The government recognises various Christian denominations. Christians are free to worship and wear religious clothing, if applicable. The country has Catholic, Eastern, Oriental Orthodox and Protestant churches. Although Christian women can marry Muslim men freely, marriage between Muslim women and non-Muslim men is forbidden.

The importation and sale of religious material is allowed; however, attempts to spread Christianity among Muslims are not permitted. Customs authorities review the content of imported religious materials and will occasionally confiscate some of them. Conversion from Islam is discouraged. In spite of this, a 2015 study estimated some 200 Christians from a Muslim background, though not all of those are necessarily citizens of the UAE. Christmas items are sold in the country and noted in the media; in 2022 the UAE President and Vice President wished everyone a Merry Christmas on social media.

== History ==
In pre-Islamic times, the population of Eastern Arabia consisted of Christianized Arabs (including Abd al-Qays) and Assyrian Christians among other religions. Syriac functioned as a liturgical language. Serjeant states that the Baharna may be the Arabized descendants of converts from the original population of Christians (Aramaeans), among other religions at the time of Arab conquests. Beth Qatraye which translates "region of the Qataris" in Syriac was the Christian name used for the region encompassing north-eastern Arabia. It included Bahrain, Tarout Island, Al-Khatt, Al-Hasa, and Qatar. Oman and the United Arab Emirates comprised the diocese known as Beth Mazunaye. The name was derived from 'Mazun', the Persian name for Oman and the United Arab Emirates. Sohar was the central city of the diocese. In 2014, 25% of the Dubai residents were Christians.

== Denominations ==
=== Catholicism ===
St. Paul's Church, Abu Dhabi.

St. Francis of Assisi Catholic Church, Jebel Ali.

The Catholic Church in the United Arab Emirates is part of the worldwide Catholic Church, under the spiritual leadership of the Pope in Rome. Expatriates in the country who are Catholics are largely Filipinos, Indians, Afghanis & Sri Lankans, South Americans, Lebanese, Africans, Italians, Spanish, Portuguese, French, Germans, Ukrainians and other Europeans. The United Arab Emirates forms part of the Apostolic Vicariate of Southern Arabia and the Vicar Apostolic Bishop Paul Hinder is based in Abu Dhabi.

In 2023, there are 10 Catholic churches in the region:

- St. Joseph's Cathedral, Abu Dhabi
- St. Mary's Catholic Church, Dubai
- St. Francis of Assisi Catholic Church, Jebel Ali
- St. Michael's Catholic Church, Sharjah
- St. Mary's Catholic Church, Al Ain
- St. Paul's Catholic Church, Abu Dhabi
- St. Anthony of Padua Church, Ras Al Khaimah
- Our Lady of Perpetual Help Catholic Church, Fujairah
- St. John the Baptist Catholic Church, Ruwais
- St. Francis Church, Abu Dhabi (opened in February 2023)
- Sub Centres in Kalba, Khorfakkan, Dibba and Madinat Zayed.

=== Eastern Orthodoxy ===
St. Philip the Apostle Russian Orthodox Church in Sharjah

Eastern Orthodox Christians in UAE traditionally belong to the jurisdiction of Eastern Orthodox Patriarchate of Antioch and All the East. Eastern Orthodox parishes in Dubai and Abu Dhabi were organized in 1980 by late Metropolitan Constantine Papastephanou of Baghdad and Kuwait (1969–2014), who also had ecclesiastical jurisdiction over Eastern Orthodox in UAE. Since 1989, parish in Abu Dhabi was administered by priest Stephanos Neaimeh. After the retirement of Metropolitan Constantine in 2014, the Holy Synod of Eastern Orthodox Patriarchate of Antioch decided to establish an Exarchate for Eastern Orthodox in UAE. In the same time, auxiliary Bishop Gregorios Khoury was appointed head of the newly established Exarchate, subjected directly to Patriarch John X of Antioch who personally visited UAE in the spring of 2014 and inaugurated the construction of new Eastern Orthodox Cathedral of Saint Elias in Abu Dhabi.

=== Oriental Orthodoxy ===
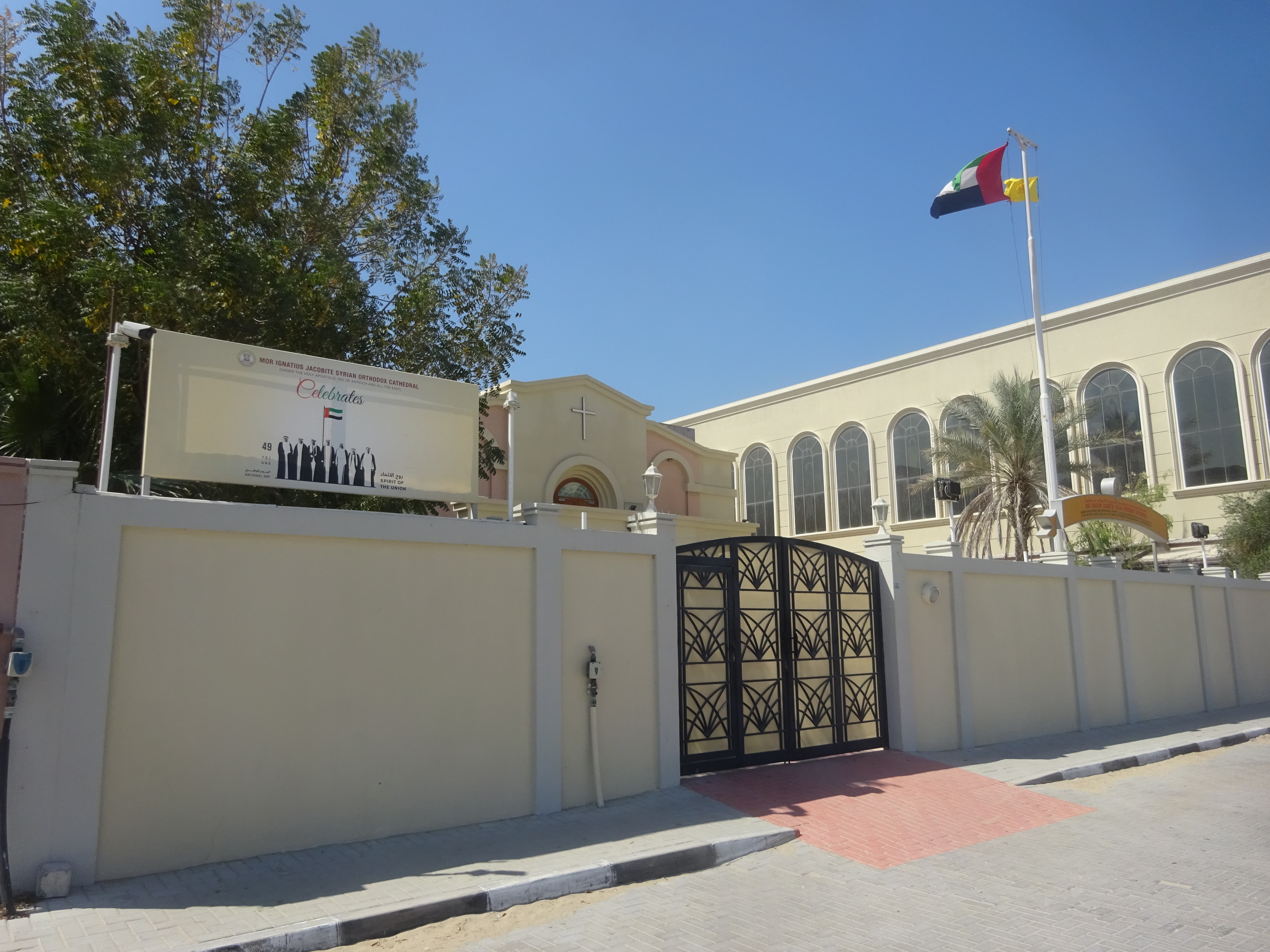
Mor Ignatius Jacobite Syrian Orthodox Cathedral, Jebel Ali Village, Dubai

Most of the Oriental Orthodox churches are under the Coptic Orthodox Church. There are several Syriac Orthodox churches also in the UAE. Some of the Oriental Orthodox churches in UAE are listed below:

Abu Dhabi:

- St. George Orthodox Cathedral, Malankara Orthodox Syrian Church
- St Antony Coptic Orthodox Church
- St. Mary & St. Shenoudah Coptic Orthodox Church
- St. Stephen Jacobite Syriac Orthodox church
- St. Thomas Jacobite Syriac Orthodox Church
- The Armenian Church Of Abu Dhabi

Dubai:

- St. Thomas Orthodox Cathedral Dubai
- St. Mark & St. Bishoy Coptic Orthodox Church
- St. Mina Coptic Orthodox Church
- Mor Ignatius Jacobite Syriac Orthodox Cathedral

Sharjah:

- St. Mary & St. Abou Sefein Coptic Orthodox Church
- Saint Gregory the Illuminator Armenian Church
- St. Marys Jacobite Syriac Orthodox soonoro Patriarchal Cathedral

Ras Al Khaimah:

- St. Mary and Archangel Michael Coptic Orthodox Cathedral
- St. Gregorious Jacobite Syriac Orthodox Church

=== Protestantism ===
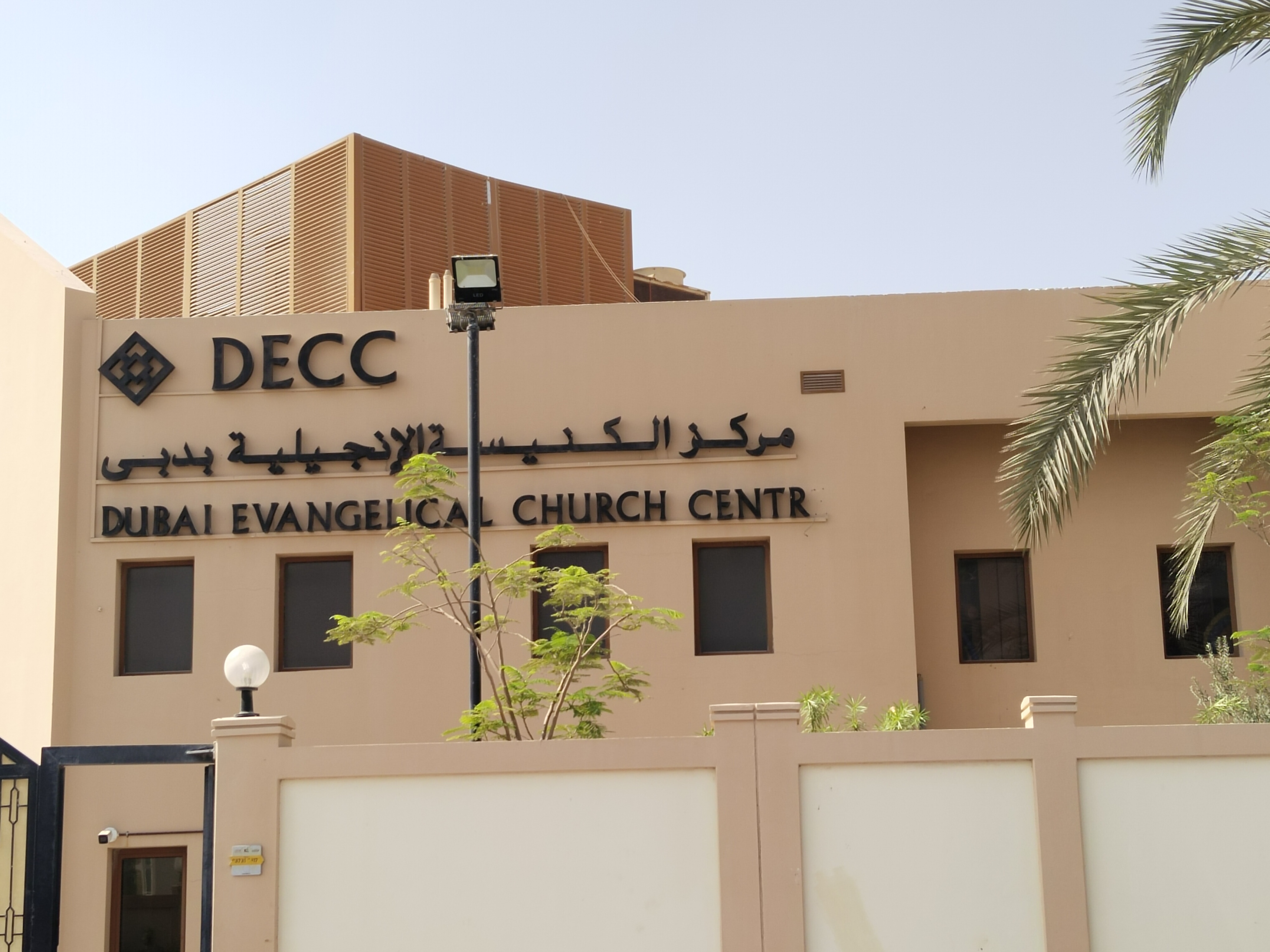
The Evangelical Christian Church of Dubai.

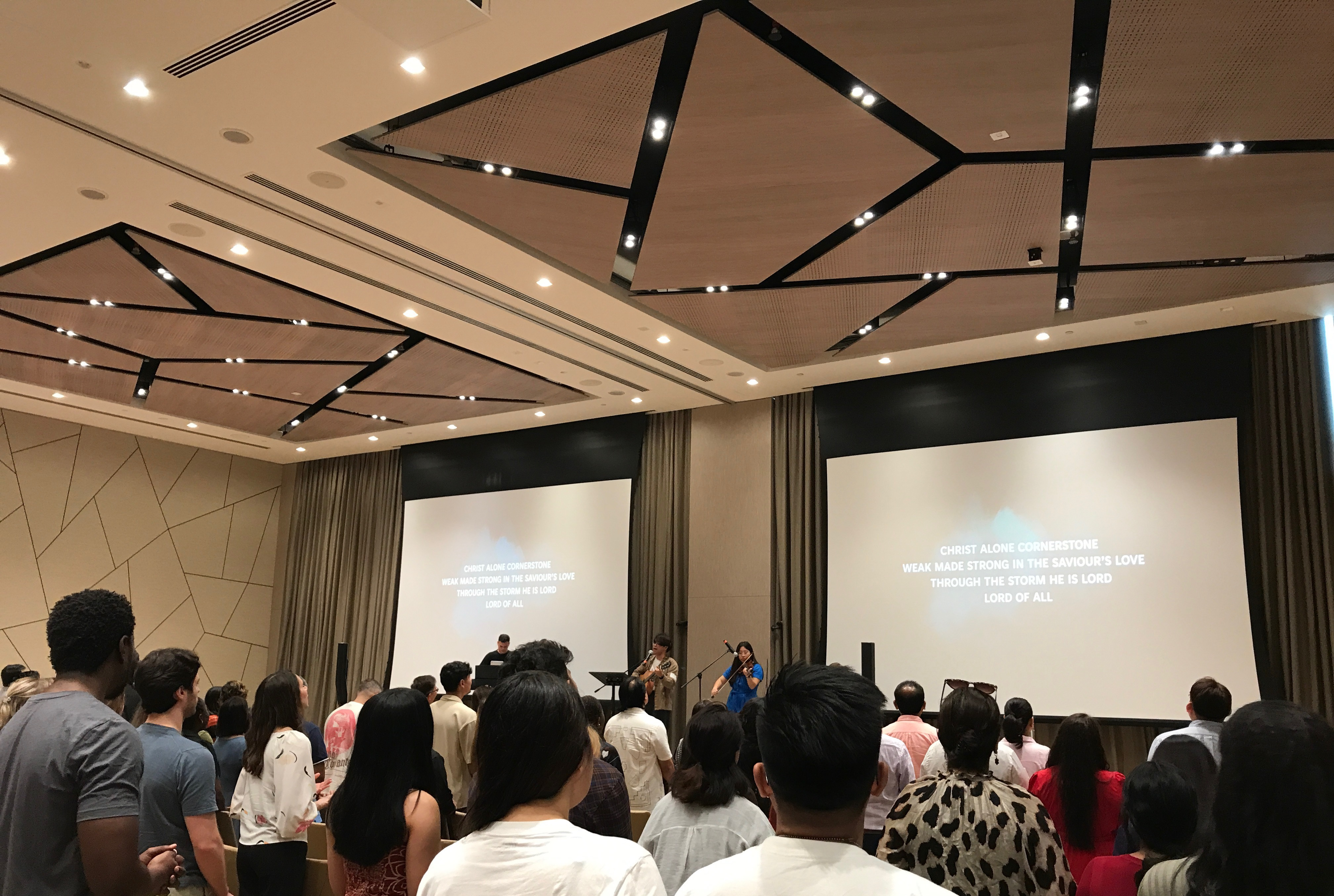
Worship service at Emirates Baptist Church International in Dubai, affiliated with the International Baptist Convention.

The primary registered protestant Churches in the United Arab Emirates are Anglican, Evangelical, and the Mar Thoma Church. The Anglican Communion is represented by the Diocese of Cyprus and the Gulf of the Episcopal Church in Jerusalem and the Middle East. Evangelical Churches exist from various denominations including Presbyterian, Baptist, Brethren, and Pentecostal.

Registered Protestant Churches in the United Arab Emirates:

- Holy Trinity Church, Bur Dubai
- Christ Church Jebel Ali, Jebel Ali
- The Evangelical Christian Church of Dubai, Jebel Ali
- Mar Thomas Parish, Jebel Ali
- St. Andrew's Church, Abu Dhabi
- St. Thomas Church, Al Ain
- The Evangelical Church of Abu Dhabi
- The Evangelical Church of Al Ain
- The Mar Thomas Church, Abu Dhabi
- The Mar Thomas Church, Al Ain
- St. Martin's Anglican Church, Sharjah
- Union Church, Sharjah
- St. Luke Anglican Church
- The Evangelical Church of Ras al Khaimah
- The 7th Day Adventists Church, Ras al Khaimah

The large number of migrants from the South Indian state of Kerala follow Christianity, predominantly from the Christian belt of Central Kerala. The denominations represented by this community includes the Mar Thoma Syrian Church, Malankara Orthodox Syrian Church, Knanaya, Pentecostalism (including Indian Pentecostal Church of God, Church of God (Cleveland, Tennessee), Assemblies of God USA, among others) and numerous other evangelical and non-denominational independent groups.

Sharjah houses a church district in Al Yarmook Area which includes places of worship for Coptics, Armenians, Keralites, Filipinos, etc. Since 2006 there are also an independent Afrikaans Churches in Dubai, Abu Dhabi and Al Ain. Most of the members ad here from the Afrikaans speaking Reformed and Evangelical Churches in South Africa.

The Seventh-day Adventist Church has a presence in the United Arab Emirates, including their scouting group Pathfinders.

=== Assyrian Church of the East ===
In Sharjah, the Assyrian Church of the East has a church building, the Mart Mariam Church. The church has operated since 2005, and is jointly shared with St. Thomas Christians with an attendance of more than 300.

=== The Church of Jesus Christ of Latter-day Saints ===
The Church of Jesus Christ of Latter-day Saints formally began holding church services in Dubai in 1982. The services grew from a small group of less than ten people to a stake organized by apostle Jeffrey R. Holland in 2013. The stake currently has 6 congregations: 5 wards and 1 branch.

On April 5, 2020, church president Russell M. Nelson announced that the government of the United Arab Emirates had invited the church to construct a temple in Dubai. According to the church, the temple will be constructed in District 2020 after Expo 2020 has concluded.

== Art and media ==
Christian art is an important part of expressing faith for Christians, as are the many forms of Christian media. Archeological sites containing early Christian art and architecture can be found throughout the region, including at Sir Bani Yas and Siniyah Island.

Christian news outlets such as Christian Broadcasting Network and Trinity Broadcasting Network operate in the region, as do various forms of Christian radio. Contemporary Christian music bands and artists have performed and recorded music videos in the country, and Christian films often see release in Dubai theatres. There are Christian bookstores, which carry Christian literature and media, there is a chain of Bible Society Book Stores which can be found in Abu Dhabi, Dubai, Sharjah, Al Ain, and RAK.

== See also ==
- Christianity by country
- Catholic Church in the United Arab Emirates
- Protestantism in the United Arab Emirates
- Religion in the United Arab Emirates
- Freedom of religion in the United Arab Emirates
- Human rights in the United Arab Emirates

== Sources ==
- Cameron, Averil (2002), The Mediterranean World in Late Antiquity, Routledge, ISBN 978-1-134-98081-9
- Holes, Clive (2001), Dialect, Culture, and Society in Eastern Arabia: Glossary, Brill, ISBN 978-90-04-10763-2
- Houtsma, Martijn Theodoor, ed. (1993), E.J. Brill's First Encyclopaedia of Islam, 1913-1936, Volume 5, Brill, ISBN 978-90-04-09791-9
- Kozah, Mario; Abu-Husayn, Abdulrahim (2014), The Syriac Writers of Qatar in the Seventh Century, Gorgias Press, LLC, ISBN 978-1-4632-0355-9
- Smart, J. R. (1996), Tradition and Modernity in Arabic Language and Literature, Psychology Press, ISBN 978-0-7007-0411-8
