= St. Therese Church, Abu Dhabi =

Catholic Church in Abu Dhabi

St. Therese Church
- St. Therese of the Child Jesus Church
- St. Therese Church
- 24.449125831605784°N 54.38534929744973°E
- Location: Al Mushrif, Abu Dhabi
- Country: United Arab Emirates
- Denomination: Roman Catholic Church
- Religious institute: Order of Friars Minor Capuchin
- Website: www.stjosephsabudhabi.org

History
- Status: Church
- Founded: 2014; 12 years ago
- Founder: Fr. Savarimuthu
- Dedication: 14 October 2014; 11 years ago

Architecture
- Functional status: Active
- Architect: Modern

Administration
- Diocese: Apostolic Vicariate of Southern Arabia
- Deanery: United Arab Emirates
- Parish: St. Joseph's Cathedral

Clergy
- Bishop(s): Most Rev. Paolo Martinelli, OFM Cap.
- Rector: Rev. Fr. Chito Bunda Bartolo, OFM Cap.

St. Therese of the Child Jesus Church, Abu Dhabi (commonly known as St. Therese Church) is a Catholic church located in Abu Dhabi, the capital city of the United Arab Emirates. It is a part of the Vicariate of Southern Arabia, and is a church within the Parish of St. Joseph's Church. The newly reconstructed St. Joseph's Parish Centre, which includes the St. Therese Church, was blessed during a ceremony on December 14, 2013. The church is named after St. Therese of Lisieux, also known as "The Little Flower," a French Catholic saint and Doctor of the Church who is revered for her humility and devotion to God.

== History ==
The first Catholic Church in Abu Dhabi was established on Corniche Road in 1965, and the Parish of St. Joseph's Church was founded in 1974. As the Catholic community in Abu Dhabi grew, there was a need for a larger church. In 2007, a new project was launched to construct a bigger and more modern church, and the reconstruction began in 2013. The new St. Therese Church is a modern structure that features traditional elements of Catholic church architecture. The church has a seating capacity of over 4,000 people. The construction of the church was overseen by Parish Priest, Fr. Savarimuthu.

The Solemn Mass of Blessing for the new St. Therese Church was celebrated on December 14, 2013, by the Apostolic Vicar of Southern Arabia, Bishop Paul Hinder, together with the Apostolic Nuncio to the Arabian Peninsula, Archbishop Petar Rajic, and the Apostolic Vicar of the Vicariate of Northern Arabia, Bishop Camillo Ballin, and other priests from various parishes of the Vicariate of Southern Arabia.
