= St. Francis Xavier Church, Salalah =

Catholic Church in Salalah, Oman

Coordinates: 17.03065°N 54.15720°E

St. Francis Xavier Church
- St. Francis Xavier Church
- Location: Salalah
- Country: Oman
- Denomination: Catholic Church
- Sui iuris church: Latin Church
- Website: stfrancissalalah.org/

Administration
- Diocese: Apostolic Vicariate of Southern Arabia

Clergy
- Bishop(s): Paolo Martinelli, OFM Cap.
- Rector: Fr. Johnson Kadukanmakal, OFM Cap.

St. Francis Xavier Church is a parish of the Roman Catholic Church in the town of Salalah, Oman.

The parish is part of the Apostolic Vicariate of Southern Arabia, a territory of the Latin Rite in the United Arab Emirates, Oman and Yemen. It is one of four parishes in the Sultanate of Oman, the others being Sts. Peter and Paul, Ruwi, Muscat, Holy Spirit Church, Ghala, Muscat and St. Anthony of Padua Church, Sohar.

Fr. Augustine Antao SJ, the first parish priest, built St. Francis Xavier Church on land donated by Sultan Qaboos bin Said Al Said. The church was dedicated on 1 May 1984, followed three years later the parish hall. With the increase of the faithful, the parish hall was refurbished and became the main church. The Catechism Centre was built in 1998, and had a second storey added in 2012.

== See also ==
- Catholic Church in Oman
- Apostolic Nunciature to the Sultanate of Oman – Diplomatic post of the Holy See in Oman
