= Protestantism in the United Arab Emirates =

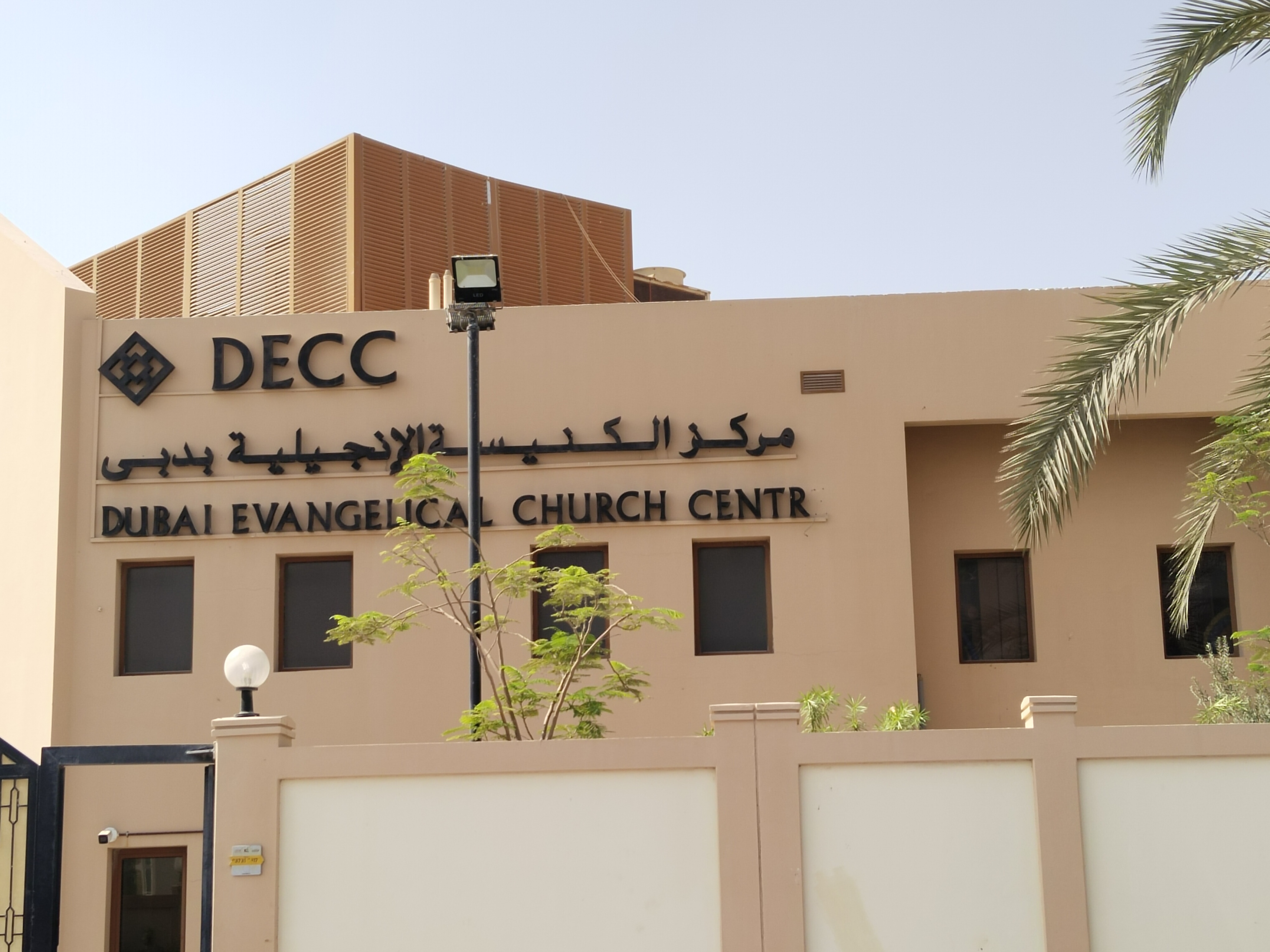
Evangelical Christian Church of Dubai (Jebel Ali Village)

Protestantism is a minority religion in the United Arab Emirates.

Among the Protestant denominations in the country are the Coptic Evangelical Church and the Anglican Church. Other denominations include the Arab Evangelical Church of Dubai, Dubai City Church, the Evangelical Christian Church of Dubai, the Baptist Church and some independent denominations. The Anglican Communion is represented by the Diocese of Cyprus and the Gulf of the Episcopal Church in Jerusalem and the Middle East.

The government does not permit churches to display crosses on the outside of their premises or to erect bell towers. Christian men are not allowed to marry Muslim women. The government discourages conversion from Islam and only Muslims are permitted to proselytize. The importation and sale of religious material is allowed; customs authorities review the content of imported religious materials and will occasionally confiscate some of them.

== See also ==
- Religion in the United Arab Emirates
- Christianity in the United Arab Emirates
- Roman Catholicism in the United Arab Emirates
- Freedom of religion in the United Arab Emirates
