= St. John the Baptist Church, Ruwais =

- Location within United Arab Emirates
- 24.093434°N 52.645120°E
- Location: Al Dhannah (Ruwais), Al Dhafra, Abu Dhabi
- Country: United Arab Emirates
- Denomination: Catholic Church
- Sui iuris church: Latin Church
- Religious institute: Order of Friars Minor Capuchin
- Website: https://jbcruwais.org/

History
- Status: Parish church
- Founded: 30 December 2018; 7 years ago (parish established)
- Events: 17 December 2021; 4 years ago (church inauguration and blessing)

Architecture
- Functional status: Active
- Architectural type: Church
- Groundbreaking: 12 December 2018; 7 years ago
- Completed: December 2021; 4 years ago

Administration
- Diocese: Apostolic Vicariate of Southern Arabia
- Deanery: United Arab Emirates

Clergy
- Bishop(s): Most Rev. Paolo Martinelli, OFM Cap.
- Rector: Rev. Fr. Joby Vengappally, OFM Cap.

St. John the Baptist Church is a Roman Catholic parish located in Ruwais (Al Dhannah), in the Al Dhafra region of the Emirate of Abu Dhabi, United Arab Emirates. Established as a parish in 2018, it is one of the five Catholic parishes in the emirate and serves the Catholic population across the Al Dhafra region.

== History ==
For over a decade, Catholic pastoral care in Ruwais and the wider Al Dhafra region was provided by clergy from St. Joseph’s Cathedral in Abu Dhabi, who travelled to the area to celebrate Mass and administer sacraments.

With the growth of the Catholic community in Ruwais, the need for a permanent church became evident. St. John the Baptist Church was elevated to parish status on 12 December 2018 by Bishop Paul Hinder, then Apostolic Vicar of Southern Arabia. On the same day, Fr. Thomas Ampattukuzhy, OFM Cap. was appointed as the first parish priest.

The establishment of the parish followed discussions between Bishop Paul Hinder and Sheikh Mohammed bin Zayed Al Nahyan, then Crown Prince of Abu Dhabi, who approved and donated land for the construction of a church in Ruwais.

Construction of the church experienced delays due to the COVID-19 pandemic but was largely completed by December 2021. The church and presbytery were officially inaugurated and blessed on 17 December 2021 by Bishop Paul Hinder, in the presence of clergy, religious, and faithful.
