= Holy Trinity Church, Dubai =

Church in Dubai, United Arab Emirates

Coordinates: 25.29323°N 55.33510°E

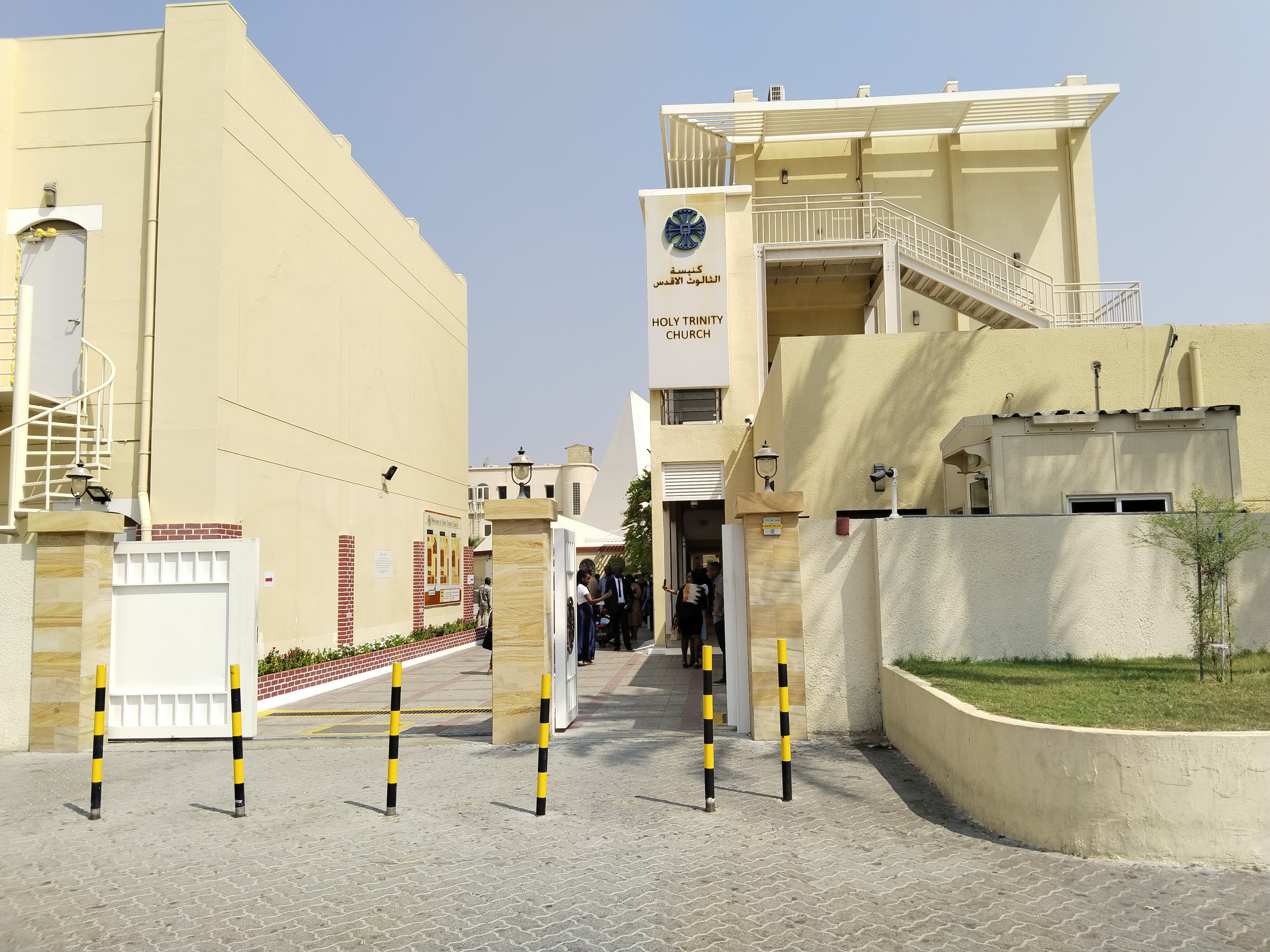
- Main Entrance of Holy Trinity Church, Dubai
- Orientation: Inter-denominational
- Associations: Anglican Communion
- Region: Dubai, United Arab Emirates
- Origin: 5 April 1970
- Branched from: Protestant
- Official website: www.holytrinitychurchdubai.org
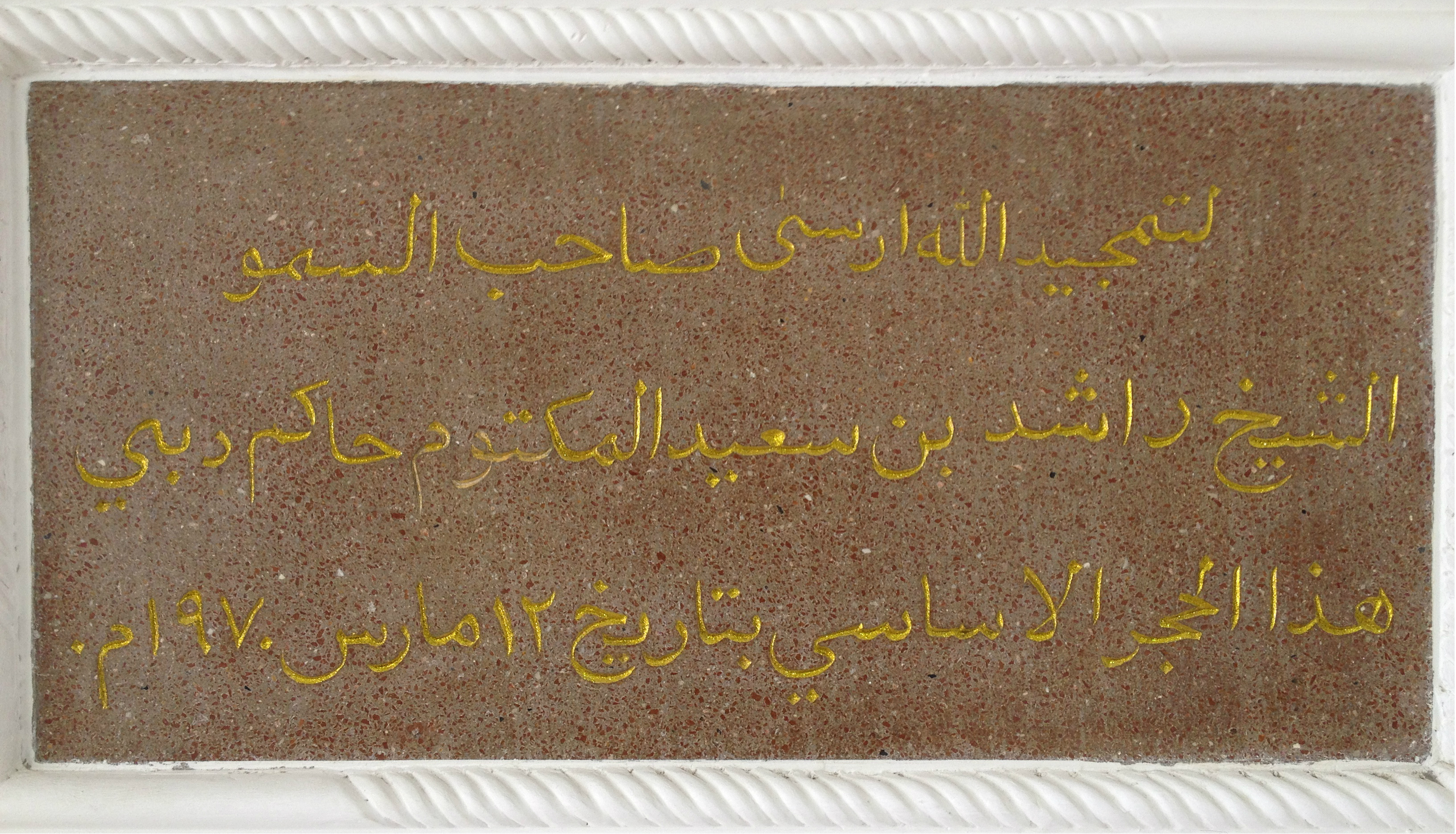
- Foundation Stone Holy Trinity Church Dubai

The Holy Trinity Church (Arabic: كنيسة الثالوث الأقدس) is an inter-denominational Christian church in Dubai, United Arab Emirates. It is part of the Chaplaincy of Dubai, Sharjah and the Northern Emirates. It was founded on 5 April 1970, on the land granted by the Emir of Dubai, Sheikh Rashid bin Saeed Al Maktoum.

The church has strong ties to the Anglican tradition, but the church compound is used by over 120 different Christian groups like Dubai City Church, with 10–11,000 worshippers attending weekly.

Rev Harrison Chinnakumar was appointed as Chaplain in August 2016 and was licensed by The Bishop of the Anglican Diocese of Cyprus and the Gulf, Rt Reverend Bishop Michael Lewis, who began his ministry in 2007.

== Location ==
The Holy Trinity Church in Dubai is situated in the area of Oud Metha, and is near the St. Mary's Catholic Church, Dubai.

== Chaplains ==
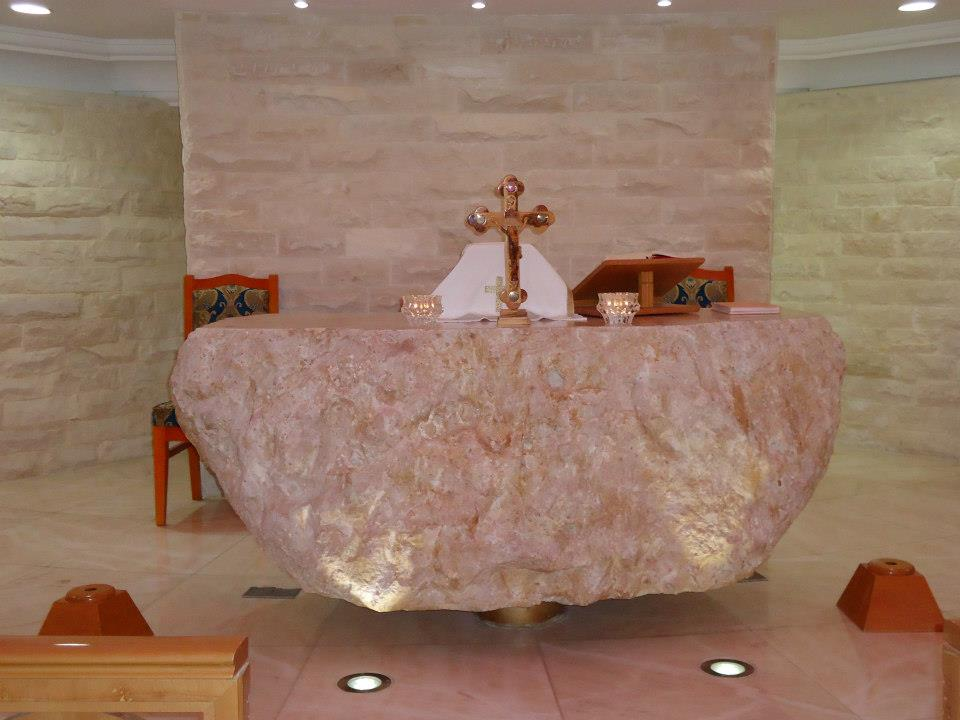
The altar at Holy Trinity Church Dubai

The Chaplain of Holy Trinity Church has, to date, also been the Senior Chaplain of the Chaplaincy of Dubai, Sharjah and the Northern Emirates

Rev Kenneth Ridgewell 1969-1971
Rev Canon Haydn Parry 1971-1972
Rev Phillip Sturdy 1972-1978
Rev John Paxton 1978-1981
Rev Phillip Saywell 1981-1984
Rev Canon Dennis Gurney 1984-2001
Rev Peter Roberts 2001-2002
Rev John Weir 2004-2010
Rev Canon Stephen Wright, Chaplain of Christ Church Jebel Ali (interregnum) 2010-2011
Rev Dr Ruwan Palapathwala 2011 to 2014
Rev Timothy Heaney (Associate Chaplain) 2012 to 2014
Rev Harrison Chinnakumar 2016
Rev Prema Mitra 2023

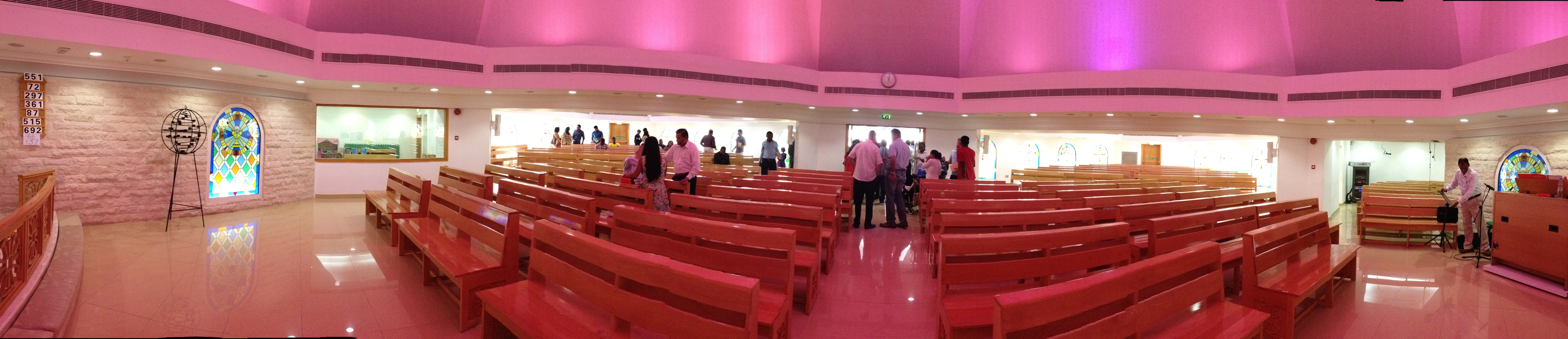
Panoramic view of the Holy Trinity Church Of Dubai

== See also ==
- Anglican Diocese of Cyprus and the Gulf
- Chaplaincy of Dubai, Sharjah and the Northern Emirates
- Christ Church Jebel Ali
- Mission to Seafarers
- Bishop Michael Lewis

== Sources ==
- http://www.cypgulf.org/index.php?option=com_qcontacts&view=section&Itemid=69
- http://www.oikoumene.org/en/news/news-management/eng/a/article/1634/in-dubai-christians-pray.html?tx_ttnews[cat]=113&cHash=238e679cac25143867f81c1c1b530136
- http://gulfnews.com/news/gulf/uae/community-reports/holy-trinity-church-reflects-dubai-s-ethnic-diversity-1.658812
