= Sts. Peter and Paul Church, Muscat =

Catholic Church in Muscat, Oman

Coordinates: 23.606665°N 58.535846°E

Sts. Peter and Paul Church
- Sts. Peter and Paul Church
- Location: Muscat
- Country: Oman
- Denomination: Roman Catholic Church

History
- Dedicated: November 4, 1977

Architecture
- Functional status: Active

Administration
- Diocese: Apostolic Vicariate of Southern Arabia

Clergy
- Bishop(s): Paolo Martinelli, OFM Cap.
- Priest: Fr. Stephen Lewis

The Sts. Peter and Paul Church is a Catholic church in Ruwi, in the city of Muscat, the capital and largest city of the Sultanate of Oman, south of the Arabian Peninsula. This is one of the two Catholic churches found in the city and capital, the other being dedicated to the Holy Spirit in the industrial district of Ghala. It also holds the distinction of being the oldest Catholic church in the country.

The temple follows the Roman or Latin rite and depends on the Apostolic Vicariate of Southern Arabia (Apostolicus Vicariatus Arabiae Meridionalis or النيابة الرسولية من جنوب الجزيرة العربية). The original church was consecrated by Cardinal Simon Lourduswamy on April 4, 1977, thanks to a donation of land's own Sultan of Oman and religious tolerance in the country. Most of those who come to church are expatriate workers who began arriving to the place from twentieth century. Due to the increase of the congregation, the church was expanded with funds from the faithful and reopened in 1995.

== See also ==
- Catholic Church in Oman
- Apostolic Nunciature to the Sultanate of Oman – Diplomatic post of the Holy See in Oman
