= Mary, Mother of Jesus Mosque =

Mosque in Abu Dhabi, United Arab Emirates

- مسجد مريم أم عيسى
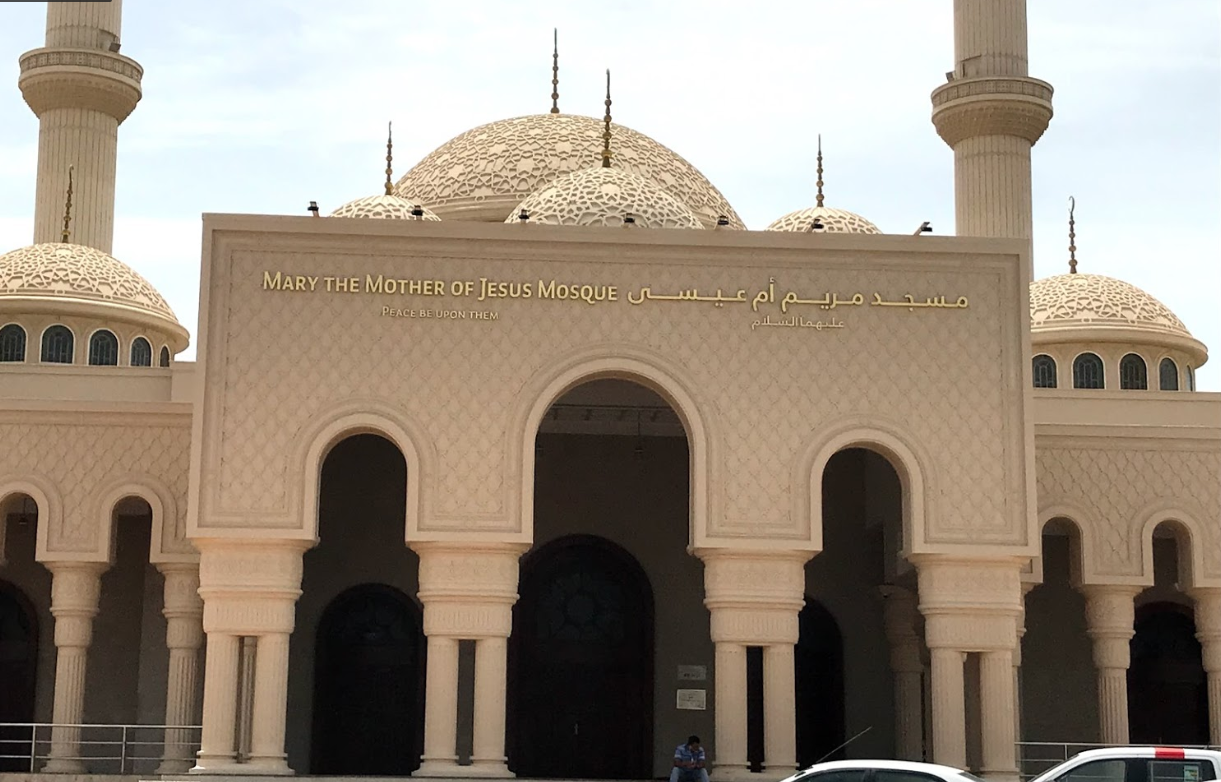

- Location in the UAE

Religion
- Affiliation: Sunni Islam
- Ownership: Government

Location
- Location: Abu Dhabi, U.A.E.
- Interactive map of Mary, Mother of Jesus Mosque
- Coordinates: 24.449917°N 54.385806°E

Architecture
- Type: Mosque
- Groundbreaking: 1989
- Minaret: 4

Mary, Mother of Jesus Mosque, also called in Arabic, Maryam Umm Eisa Masjid (Arabic: مسجد مريم أم عيسى عليهما السلام, Masjid Maryam Umm ‘Īsā) is a mosque located in Al Mushrif, a central neighborhood in the city of Abu Dhabi, the capital city of the United Arab Emirates. It was built in 1989 as Mohammed Bin Zayed Mosque, and named after Mohammed bin Zayed Al Nahyan, Ruler of Abu Dhabi.

On 14 June 2017, Sheikh Mohammed bin Zayed Al Nahyan decided to rename the mosque to "Mary, Mother of Jesus Mosque". The change was done as an initiative exemplifying the values of co-existence among religions in the UAE, as well as to honour Mary, Mother of Jesus who is a respected figure in Islam.

The mosque complex is at one corner and besides by a Christian community of numerous church complexes, amongst them are the St. Joseph's Cathedral, Abu Dhabi, the Church of St. Anthony and the neighbouring St. Andrew's Church.

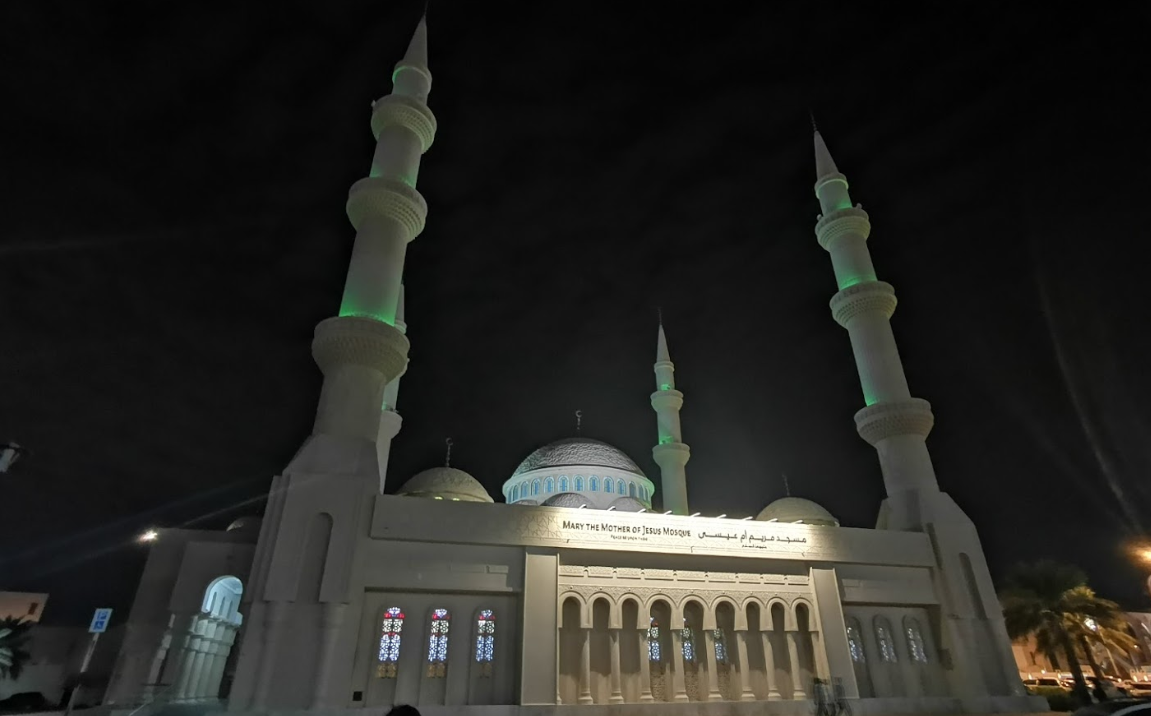
Side view of the Mary, The Mother of Jesus Mosque (formerly named Sheikh Mohammed bin Zayed Mosque) at night.

== See also ==
- List of mosques in the United Arab Emirates
