= Lulu Island (disambiguation) =

Lulu Island is an island located in British Columbia, Canada.

Lulu Island may also refer to:

- Lulu Island (Abu Dhabi), in the United Arab Emirates
- Lulu Island (Alaska), an island of Alaska
