= St. Anthony of Padua Church, Ras Al Khaimah =

- Location within United Arab Emirates
- 25.712°N 55.802°E
- Location: Al Jazirah Al Hamra, Ras Al Khaimah
- Country: United Arab Emirates
- Denomination: Catholic Church
- Sui iuris church: Latin Church
- Religious institute: Order of Friars Minor Capuchin
- Website: https://stanthonyrak.org/

History
- Status: Parish church
- Founded: 14 June 2013; 13 years ago
- Dedication: Saint Anthony of Padua

Architecture
- Functional status: Active
- Architectural type: Church
- Completed: June 2013; 13 years ago

Specifications
- Capacity: ~3,500 (1,500 main hall + 2,000 basement)

Administration
- Diocese: Apostolic Vicariate of Southern Arabia
- Deanery: United Arab Emirates

Clergy
- Bishop(s): Most Rev. Paolo Martinelli, OFM Cap.
- Rector: Rev. Fr. Joy Menacherry

St. Anthony of Padua Church is a Roman Catholic church located in Al Jazirah Al Hamra, in the emirate of Ras Al Khaimah, United Arab Emirates and is one of the largest churches in the country.

== History ==
The origins of the church date back to 9 April 1976, when the first mass in the emirate was celebrated in the staff quarters of the Ras Al Khaimah Hotel. In the following decades, as the Catholic population grew, Masses were held in a variety of temporary locations across the emirate, including private villas, residential compound.

On 11 January 1999, Sheikh Saud bin Saqr Al Qasimi, then Deputy Ruler of Ras Al Khaimah, granted permission to the local community to construct a Catholic prayer hall. A local parish community oversaw the construction, which was completed later that year. However, it took several years before it could be formally used and was eventually consecrated on 17 December 2005 by Bishop Paul Hinder, and in November 2006, the parish received its first resident priest, Fr. John Van der Linde.

In 2007, Sheikh Saud bin Saqr Al Qasimi, Ruler of Ras Al Khaimah, allocated land in Al Jazirah Al Hamra for churches of multiple Christian denominations; enabling the development of a larger church complex to accommodate the growing Catholic population.

The present church building was constructed in the early 2010s and was formally consecrated on 14 June 2013 by Cardinal Fernando Filoni, in the presence of Archbishop Petar Rajič and Bishop Paul Hinder.

== Clergy ==
=== Present and past parish priests ===
No.	Name	Term start	Term end
1	Fr. John Van der Linde OFM Cap.	2006	2007
2	Fr. Mathew Fernandes OFM Cap.	2007	2009
3	Fr. Thomas Ampattukuzhy OFM Cap.	2009	2018
4	Fr. Thomas Sebastian OFM Cap.	2018	2022
5	Fr. Joy Menacherry OFM Cap.	2022	Incumbent
