= Eugene Mattioli =

Catholic missionary in Arabia

Reverend Eugene Mattioli OFM Cap.

Personal life
- Born: 30 May 1931 (age 95) Salutio, Arezzo, Italy
- Parents: Giovanni Mattioli (father); Algelida Caporali (mother)

Religious life
- Religion: Roman Catholic
- Order: Order of Friars Minor Capuchin
- Ordination: 16 March 1957

Eugene Mattioli OFM Cap. (born 30 May 1931) is an Italian missionary, who was the longest serving Catholic missionary in Arabia and completed 60 years of service in the Vicariate and retired on 30 June 2018. He is one of the people credited with establishing the presence of the Catholic Church in the Arabian Peninsula.

== Early life and education ==
Eugene Mattioli was born to Giovanni Mattioli and Algelida Caporali on 30 May 1931 in Salutio, Arezzo, Italy. After his early schooling, he joined the Capuchin seminary at Poppi and entered the novitiate in Cathona.

He went to Arezzo and Sienna for his philosophical studies and Pisa and later Florence for his theological studies. He was ordained a priest on 16 March 1957 in Florence. He received a mandate to be a missionary to Arabia on 28 September 1958.

== Missionary Work in Arabia ==
Fr. Eugene commenced his missionary work in Arabia on 24 October 1958 when he arrived in Aden by ship. He dedicated himself to serving in the parish and the boys' school in Aden upon his arrival.

In June 1961, he moved to Sacred Heart Church in Bahrain and served as an assistant parish priest for five years. During this time, he extended his help to the Catholic community in Qatar, Abu Dhabi, Das Island, Dubai, and Muscat, often traveling in military planes. He would leave on Mondays and return on Saturdays, after a challenging itinerary that sometimes involved celebrating multiple masses a day.

Fr. Eugene became the parish priest in Bahrain in 1965. After a short stay in Dubai, he went back to Bahrain, where he stayed for a total of 18 years, including a period in Saudi Arabia. Fr. Eugene was appointed the Vicar General of Bishop Gremoli, an office he held for almost 26 years. He also held the position of Regular Superior of the Capuchins in Arabia for seven three-year terms.

In 1989, Fr. Eugene moved to Abu Dhabi and became the parish priest of St. Joseph's Cathedral. He served in Abu Dhabi for 17 years before being appointed the parish priest of St. Francis of Assisi Jebel Ali on 2 February 2006. Since 2016, Fr. Eugene has been stationed in St. Paul's Church, Musaffah.

He retired as a missionary and returned to Italy on 30 June 2018.
