= Mary, Mother of Jesus (disambiguation) =

Mary, mother of Jesus, is an important figure in Christianity and Islam.

Mary, Mother of Jesus may also refer to:

- Mary, Mother of Jesus (film), a 1999 American television film
- Mary, Mother of Jesus Mosque, a mosque in Abu Dhabi
