= St. Mary's Church, Al Ain =

St. Mary's Catholic Church, Al Ain
- Location within United Arab Emirates
- 24.20514°N 55.75733°E
- Location: Al Ain, Emirate of Abu Dhabi
- Country: United Arab Emirates
- Denomination: Catholic Church
- Sui iuris church: Latin Church

History
- Status: Parish church
- Founded: 1969; 57 years ago (parish established)
- Dedication: Immaculate Conception

Architecture
- Functional status: Active
- Architectural type: Church

Administration
- Diocese: Apostolic Vicariate of Southern Arabia
- Deanery: United Arab Emirates

Clergy
- Bishop(s): Most Rev. Paolo Martinelli, OFM Cap.
- Rector: Fr. Andrew Francis OFM Cap.

St. Mary's Catholic Church is a Roman Catholic parish located in Al Ain, in the Emirate of Abu Dhabi, United Arab Emirates. It is one of the oldest Catholic parishes in the country and is one of five Catholic churches in the emirate.

== History ==
St. Mary's Catholic Church was established in 1969 with the land for the church being granted by Sheikh Zayed bin Sultan Al Nahyan, the founding father and first President of the UAE. The church was constructed under the care of Fr. Barnabas Maddii OFM Cap.

Initially, the church consisted of modest structures to accommodate a small but growing Catholic population, largely composed of expatriate workers. Over time, as the population of Al Ain expanded, the parish grew significantly, necessitating the expansion of church facilities over the next few decades, with the latest addition, a parish hall, being constructed in 2013.

== Clergy ==
=== Present and past parish priests ===
No.	Name	Term start	Term end
1	Fr. Barnabas Maddii, OFM Cap.	1969	1981
2	Fr. Attilio Franceschetti, OFM Cap.	1981	1983
3	Fr. Daniel Cerofolini, OFM Cap.	1983	1986
4	Fr. Antonino Fortuna, OFM Cap.	1986	1990
5	Fr. Francis Jamieson	1990	1993
6	Fr. Mathew Fernandes	1993	2007
7	Fr. Antony Puthenpurackal, OFM Cap.	2007	2014
8	Fr. Stalin Varghese, OFM Cap.	2015	2026
9	Fr. Andrew Francis, OFM Cap.	2026	Incumbent

=== Present and past assistant parish priests ===
No.	Name	Term start	Term end
1	Fr. Augustine Fernandes, OFM Cap.	2010	2015
2	Fr. Ernesto Ablaza, MSP	2015	2025
3	Fr. Ronelo R. Resco, MSP	2025	Incumbent
