= St. Mary's Catholic Church, Dubai =

Catholic Church in Dubai, United Arab Emirates

St. Mary's Catholic Church
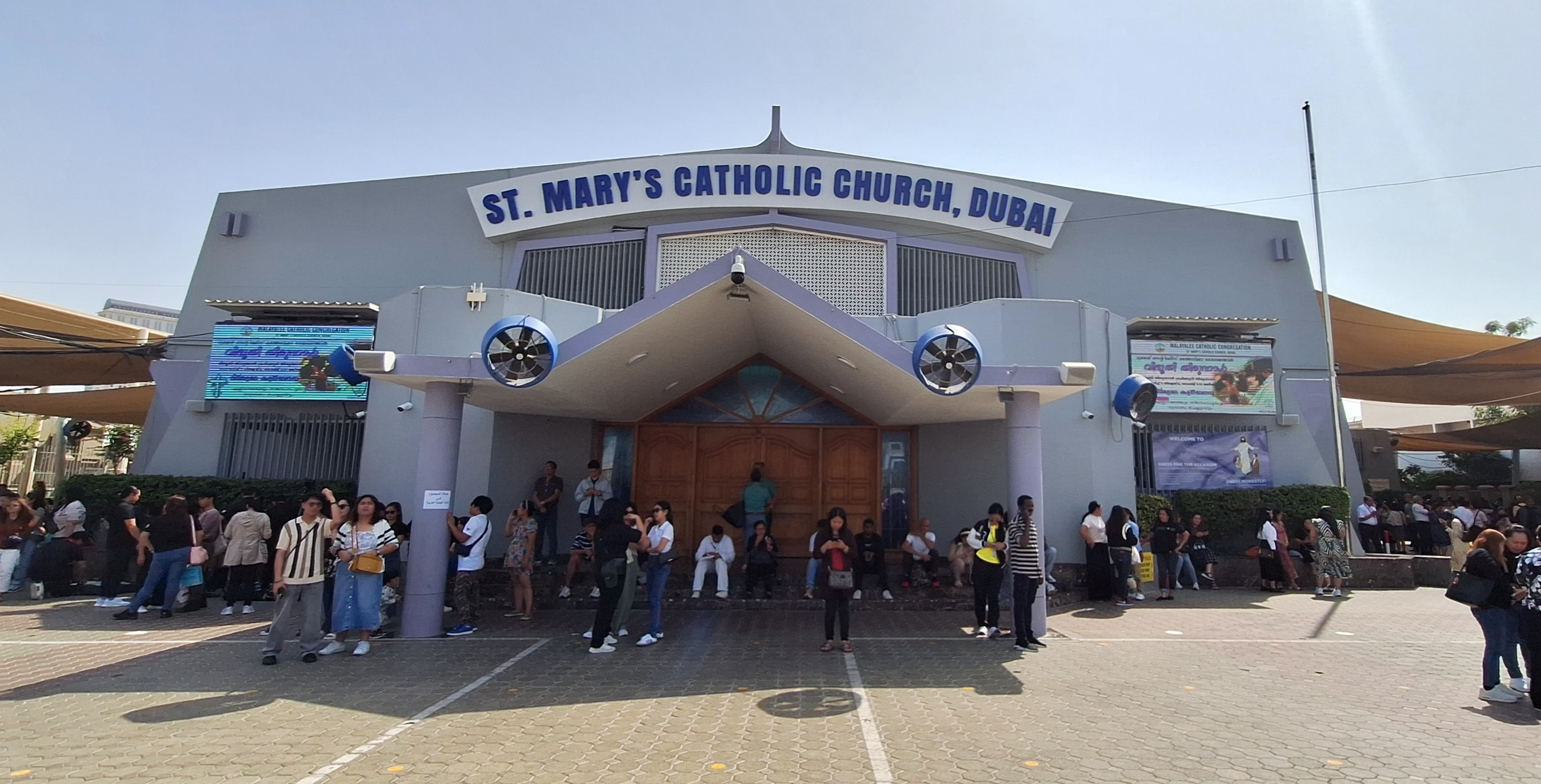
- View of St. Mary's in 2025
- St. Mary's Catholic Church
- 25.24049643123643°N 55.31759406555784°E
- Country: United Arab Emirates
- Denomination: Catholic Church
- Sui iuris church: Latin Church
- Religious institute: Order of Friars Minor Capuchin
- Website: Official website

History
- Former name: St Mary of the Assumption Parish
- Dedicated: 3 November 1989; 36 years ago

Architecture
- Completed: 3 November 1989; 36 years ago
- Demolished: 1988; 38 years ago

Administration
- Diocese: Apostolic Vicariate of Southern Arabia
- Deanery: United Arab Emirates

Clergy
- Bishop: Paolo Martinelli
- Rector: Fr. Leny Supe Escalada, O.F.M.Cap.

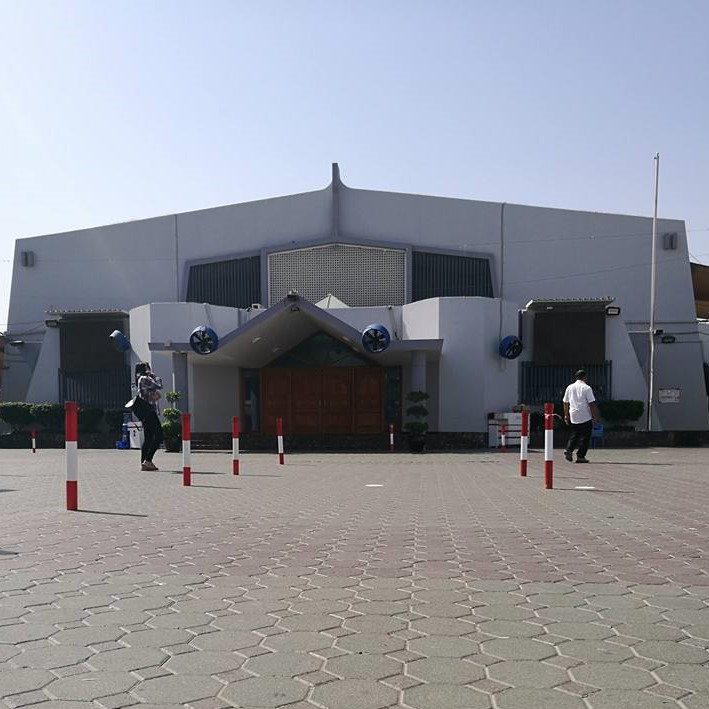
St. Mary's in 2020

St. Mary's Catholic Church (Arabic: كنيسة القديسة مريم الكاثوليكية) is a parish church of the Apostolic Vicariate of Southern Arabia located in Dubai, United Arab Emirates. As one of only two Catholic churches in Dubai, St. Mary's has grown to become the largest Catholic parish in the world thanks to immigration from Catholic communities abroad.

== History ==
Initially, Catholics in the United Arab Emirates were served by a priest based in Bahrain, but eventually there was need for a resident priest. Prime Minister Rashid bin Saeed Al Maktoum initially granted a plot of land but it was unusable due to its remoteness. Fr Eusebio Daveri then obtained a more accessible plot of land in 1965 and began construction of a church. On 7 April 1967, it was solemnly blessed by the Vicar Apostolic of Southern Arabia Irzio Luigi Magliacani, OFM Cap., and dedicated as the Church of the Assumption.

However, as the number of faithful grew, there was need for a larger church. In 1988, the Church of the Assumption was demolished and replaced with St. Mary's Catholic Church. It was dedicated on 3 November 1989 by Cardinal Jozef Tomko, Prefect of the Congregation for the Evangelisation of Peoples.

Today St. Mary's Catholic Church has over 350,000 parishioners, making it among the largest churches in the Middle East. Its members are predominately Filipino, South Asian, and African, and masses are held throughout the week in Arabic, English, French, Konkani, Malayalam, Sinhalese, Swahili, Tamil, Tagalog, Ukrainian, and Urdu.

== Clergy ==
=== Present and past parish priests ===
No.	Name	Term start	Term end
1	Rev. Fr. Eusebio Daveri	1965	1982
2	Rev. Fr. Daniele Cerofolini	1982	1984
3	Rev. Fr. Eugenio Mattioli OFM Cap.	1984	1986
4	Rev. Fr. Daniele Cerofolini OFM Cap.	1986	2004
5	Rev. Fr. Peter P. M. OFM Cap.	2004	2009
6	Rev. Fr. Tomasito B. Veneracion OFM Cap.	July 2009	October 2014
7	Fr. Lennie J. A. Connully OFM Cap.	October 2014	January 2026
8	Fr. Leny Supe Escalada OFM Cap.	January 2026	Incumbent

== See also ==
- Catholic Church in the United Arab Emirates
