= Catholic Church in Oman =

The Catholic Church in Oman is part of the worldwide Catholic Church, under the spiritual leadership of the Pope in Rome.

In 2023, Catholics made up 2.35% of the population, mostly migrant workers expatriates.

In 2020, there were 10 priests working across four parishes; there were no nuns.

Oman is part of the Vicariate Apostolic of Southern Arabia along with Yemen and the United Arab Emirates, with its center in the city of Abu Dhabi. In February 2023, the Holy See and the Sultanate of Oman issued a joint statement announcing the establishment of full diplomatic relations between the two at the level of an Apostolic Nunciature to the Sultanate of Oman and an Embassy to the Holy See.

There are four parishes in Oman with 12 priests.

- Church of St. Anthony of Padua in Sohar;
- Church of the Holy Apostles Peter and Paul in Ruwi, Muscat;
- Church of the Holy Spirit in Ghala, Muscat;
- Church of St. Francis Xavier in Salalah.

== See also ==
- Religion in Oman
- Christianity in Oman
