= Chaplaincy of Dubai, Sharjah and the Northern Emirates =

Chaplaincy of Dubai with Sharjah and the Northern Emirates
- Formation: 1970
- Headquarters: Umm Hurair, Dubai
- Lay Chair: Matthew Joseph
- Deputy Lay Chair: Charlie Lloyd-Evans
- Senior Chaplain (Acting): The Rev. Tim Heaney
- Website: Official website

The Chaplaincy of Dubai with Sharjah and the Northern Emirates is part of the Anglican Diocese of Cyprus and the Gulf. The Chaplaincy consists of five churches in the United Arab Emirates:

- Holy Trinity Church, Dubai
- Christ Church, Jebel Ali - consecrated March 2002
- St Martin's Church, Sharjah
- St Luke's Church, Ras Al Khaimah
- St Nicholas' Church, Fujairah

The emirate of Abu Dhabi (also part of the UAE) is a separate chaplaincy with two churches

- St Andrew's Church in Abu Dhabi
- St Thomas' Church in Al Ain

Although formally instituted as the 'Chaplaincy of Dubai and Sharjah' on 5 April 1970, its history started during the 1960s and it is now known as the 'Chaplaincy of Dubai and Sharjah with the Northern Emirates'. St. Martin's Anglican Church was started by the RAF in 1926 with Holy Trinity following on 13 December 1970. Christ Church was created in 2002 in Jebel Ali, with St. Luke in Ras Al Khaimah following.

== Senior Chaplains ==
The Senior Chaplain of the Chaplaincy of Dubai, Sharjah and the Northern Emirates had, until 2014, usually also been the Chaplain of Holy Trinity Church, Dubai

The Rev. Kenneth Ridgewell 1969-1971
The Rev. Canon Haydn Parry 1971-1972
The Rev. Phillip Sturdy 1972-1978
The Rev. John Paxton 1978-1981
The Rev. Phillip Saywell 1981-1984
The Rev. Canon Dennis Gurney 1984-2001
The Rev. Peter Roberts 2001-2002
The Rev. John Weir 2004-2010
The Rev. Canon Stephen Wright, Chaplain of Christ Church Jebel Ali (interregnum) 2010-2011
The Rev. Dr. Ruwan Palapathwala 2011-14 Resigned

The Rev. Timothy Heaney of Christ Church, Jebel Ali became the "Acting Senior Chaplain" 2016-2019

The Chaplaincy of Dubai and Sharjah with the Northern Emirates (DSNE) was disestablished on 30 June 2019 making separate parishes of Holy Trinity, Dubai; Christ Church, Jebel Ali (with St. Catherine's in Silicon Oasis); St. Martin's Anglican Church, Sharjah; and St. Luke, Ras al Khaimah (with St. Nicholas in Fujairah). All of these parishes are integral and constituent members within the Anglican Diocese of Cyprus and the Gulf.

== See also ==
Anglican Diocese of Cyprus and the Gulf
Chaplaincy of Dubai, Sharjah and the Northern Emirates
Christ Church Jebel Ali
Mission to Seafarers
Bishop Michael Lewis
