= Al Lulu Island =

Island in the United Arab Emirates

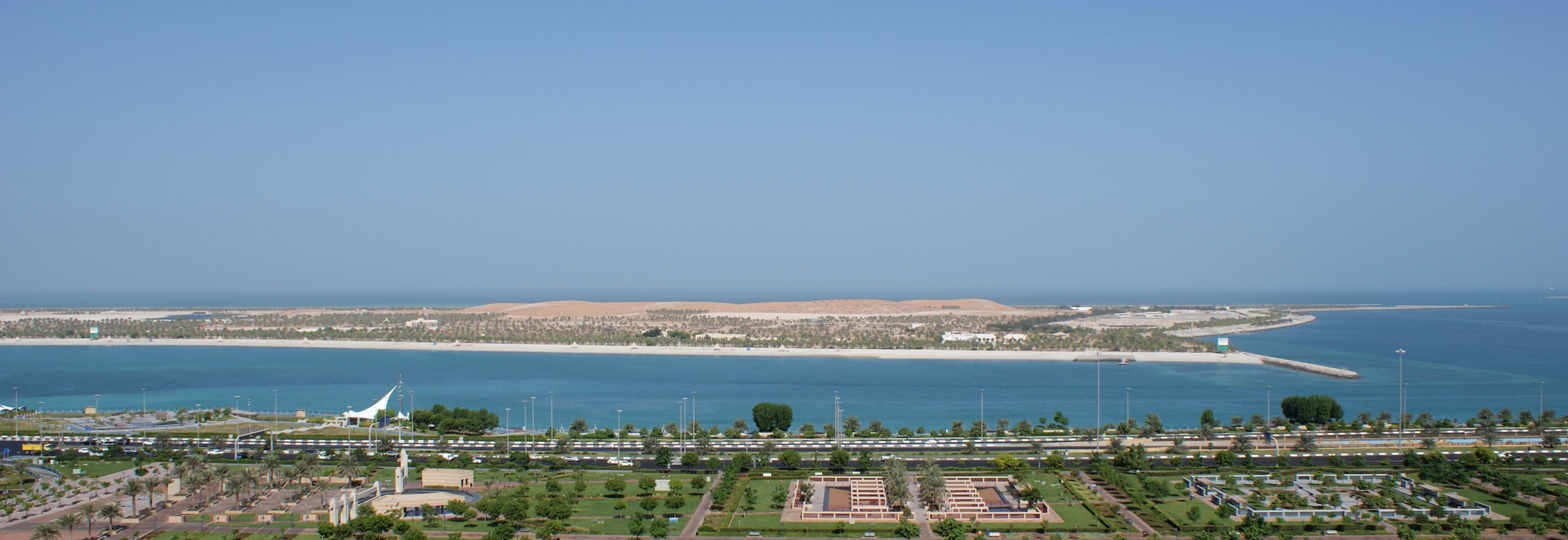
- Abu Dhabi Corniche overlooking Lulu Island
- Interactive map of Al Lulu Island

Geography
- Coordinates: 24°29′57″N 54°20′38″E

Administration
- United Arab Emirates

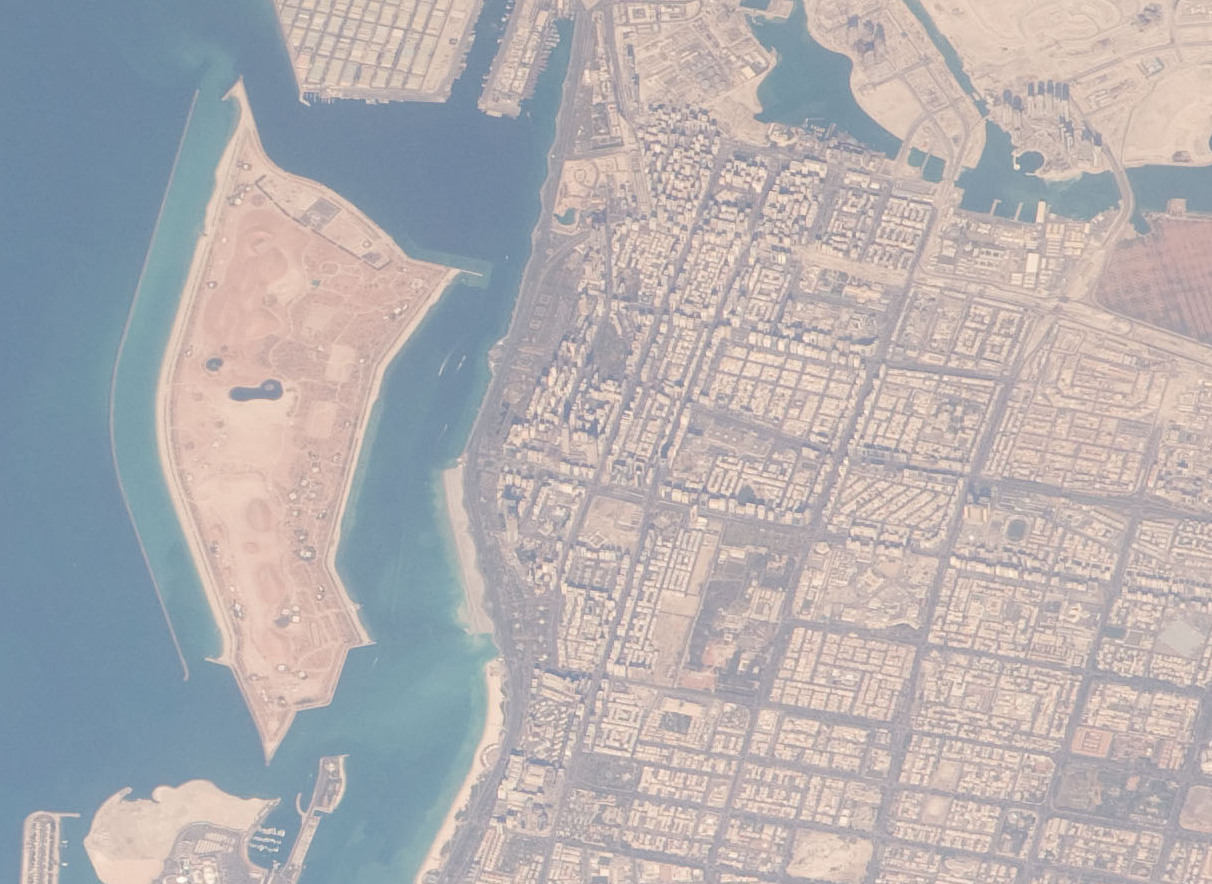
Al Lulu from above (ISS)

Al Lulu Island (Arabic: جزيرة اللؤلؤ; Pearl island) is a 1,050-acre (4.2 km^{2}) man-made island off the coast of Abu Dhabi island, the capital of the United Arab Emirates. It stretches from the Abu Dhabi Breakwater to Mina Zayed. Al Lulu Island is only accessed by private boat.

== Development ==
Land reclamation was started in 1986 and completed in 1992. In 1981, Brazilian architect Oscar Niemeyer worked on a proposal for the island to turn it into a leisure island including hotels and waterside residences, an elevated monorail, marina and aquarium, a nautical club, helipads, a convention centre and a zoo. Niemeyer's plans included a rejuvenation centre designed to attract geriatric medical tourists, and a culturally sensitive theme park that took its inspiration from One Thousand and One Nights. The proposal however was shelved because of its high costs and other more important commitments the Abu Dhabi government had at that time.

In September 2003 a corporation called the General Corporation for Development and Investment of Lulu Island was established for the development of the island. The corporation's plans for the island included a wildlife reserve, parks, hotels, restaurants, man-made lakes and a museum. In 2006 Sorouh Real Estate proposed a mixed use commercial, residential, cultural and recreational facilities on the Island and in 2010 US architecture firm Skidmore Owings & Merrill presented plans for a 1,312-foot-high 75 storey Lulu Tower that would have been shaped like a giant clam. Contract for the Lulu Road Project, an eight-kilometre-long, six-lane road that would connect the marina on Abu Dhabi's breakwater with the docks at Mina Zayed was awarded. However these projects were put on hold indefinitely.

In 2007, when the island opened to the public the island had two restaurants, four coffee shops, a track for camel and horse riding and two artificial lakes.
