= St. Paul's Church, Abu Dhabi =

كنيسة القديس بولس
- St. Paul's Catholic Church
- كنيسة القديس بولس
- 24.348788°N 54.515294°E
- Location: Mussafah, Abu Dhabi
- Country: United Arab Emirates
- Denomination: Catholic Church
- Sui iuris church: Latin Church
- Website: www.stpaulsabudhabi.org

History
- Consecrated: 12 June 2015; 11 years ago

Architecture
- Groundbreaking: 29 June 2013; 13 years ago
- Completed: 11 June 2015; 11 years ago

Specifications
- Capacity: 1,200

Administration
- Diocese: Apostolic Vicariate of Southern Arabia
- Deanery: United Arab Emirates

Clergy
- Bishop(s): Most Rev. Paolo Martinelli, OFM Cap.
- Rector: Rev. Fr. Maxim Cardoza, OFM Cap.

The St. Paul's Church (Arabic: كنيسة القديس بولس) is a religious building affiliated with the Catholic Church which is located in the area of Mussafah in Abu Dhabi, the United Arab Emirates. It is the second Catholic church to be built in the emirate since 1965 when the St. Joseph Cathedral was built.

Its history dates back to November 2011 when the municipality granted land in the industrial area of Mussafah, after 18 months of consultation. That same year the first stone of the church was laid.

It was inaugurated and blessed with the presence of local authorities as the Shaikh Nahyan bin Mubarak Al Nahyan and religious (Cardinal Pietro Parolin) on 12 June 2015.

== See also ==
- Apostolic Vicariate of Southern Arabia
- St. Joseph's Cathedral, Abu Dhabi
