= Apostolic Vicariate of Southern Arabia =

Catholic Church missionary jurisdiction

Apostolic Vicariate of Southern Arabia Apostolicus Vicariatus Arabiae Meridionalis النيابة الرسولية لجنوب شبه الجزيرة العربية

Catholic

Location
- Country: Yemen; United Arab Emirates; Oman

Statistics
- Area: 929,969 km^{2} (359,063 sq mi) (Note: Annuario Pontificio (2023) via Catholic-Hierarchy.org)
- Population: Total; Catholics: (as of 2022); 45,232,171; 1,005,600 (2.2%)
- Parishes: 17

Information
- Denomination: Catholic Church
- Rite: Byzantine Rite; Coptic Catholic; Malankara Rite; Maronite; Roman Rite; Syro-Malabar
- Cathedral: St. Joseph's Cathedral, Abu Dhabi
- Secular priests: 69 (total); 14 (diocesan); 55 (religious)
- Language: Latin; Arabic; English; Filipino; French; German; Italian; Konkani; Korean; Malayalam; Marathi; Polish; Sinhala; Spanish; Tagalog; Tamil; Ukrainian; Urdu

Current leadership
- Pope: Leo XIV
- Vicar Apostolic: Paolo Martinelli
- Bishops emeritus: Paul Hinder

Map
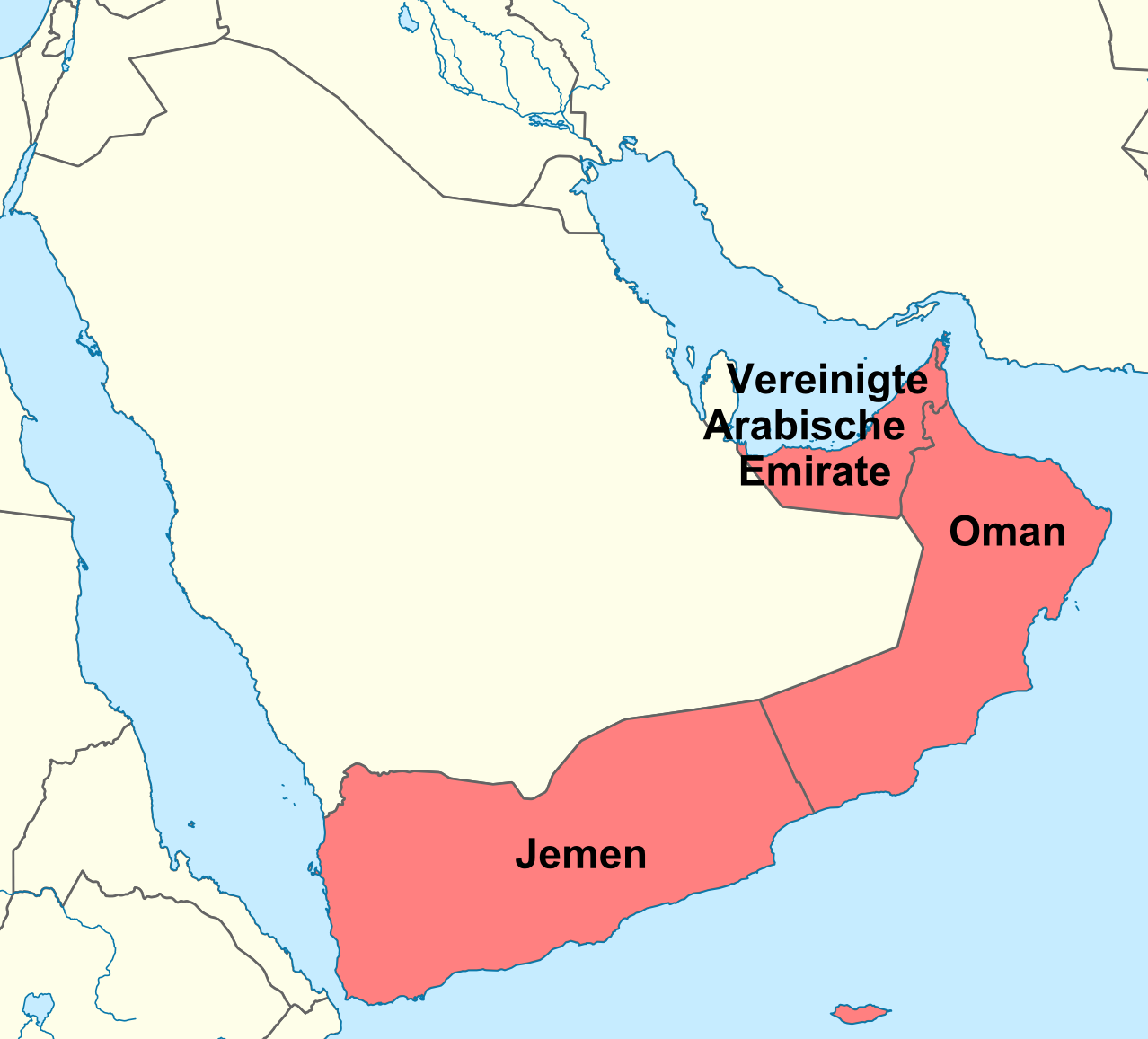

Website
- avosa.org

Vicar of Southern Arabia

Catholic
- Coat of arms
- Incumbent: Paolo Martinelli; Installed 2 July 2022

Location
- Country: United Arab Emirates, Oman and Yemen

Information
- First holder: Paul Hinder
- Established: 2011
- Cathedral: St. Joseph's Cathedral, Abu Dhabi

The Apostolic Vicariate of Southern Arabia (Latin: Vicariatus Apostolicus Arabiæ Meridionalis; Arabic: النيابة الرسولية لجنوب شبه الجزيرة العربية) is an apostolic vicariate of the Catholic Church with territorial jurisdiction over Oman, United Arab Emirates and Yemen. The current vicar apostolic is Paolo Martinelli.

It was first established in 1888 (as the Apostolic Vicariate of Aden) and took its current name in 2011. The see of the vicar apostolic is in Saint Joseph's Cathedral in Abu Dhabi. Since 1916, the cathedral has been in the care of the Capuchins of Florence.

== History ==
The territory was originally part of the Vicariate Apostolic of the Gallas, but it was separated into an apostolic prefecture by Pope Pius IX on 21 January 1875. On 25 April 1888, Pope Leo XIII made the Apostolic Vicariate of Aden, located in Yemen. On the 28 June 1889, the name was changed to the Vicariate Apostolic of Arabia, responsible for the countries of the Arabian Peninsula and surrounding region: Bahrain, Oman, Saudi Arabia, Qatar, United Arab Emirates, Somalia and Yemen.

On 29 June 1953, the then Apostolic Prefecture of Kuwait (which has become the Apostolic Vicariate of Northern Arabia) was separated from the Apostolic Vicariate of Arabia. In 1973, the see of the jurisdiction was transferred from Aden to St. Joseph's Cathedral in Abu Dhabi. A subsequent redrawing of boundaries in 2011 reduced its jurisdiction to the countries of Oman, the United Arab Emirates and Yemen.

The vicariate has been governed by the Capuchin friars since 1916.

== Apostolic Vicars of Arabia ==
1. Louis-Callixte Lasserre (1888 – April 1900)
2. Bernard Thomas Edward Clark (21 March 1902 – 18 June 1910)
3. Raffaele Presutti (13 September 1910 – 1915)
4. Evangelista Latino Enrico Vanni (15 April 1916 – 1925)
5. Pacifico Tiziano Micheloni (25 April 1933 – 6 July 1936)
6. Giovanni Tirinnanzi (2 July 1937 – 27 January 1949)
7. Irzio Luigi Magliacani (25 December 1949 – 1969)
8. Giovanni Bernardo Gremoli (2 October 1975 – 21 March 2005)
9. Paul Hinder (21 March 2005 – 31 May 2011)

=== Apostolic Vicars of Southern Arabia ===
1. Paul Hinder (31 May 2011 – 1 May 2022)
2. Paolo Martinelli (1 May 2022 – present)

== Statistics ==
=== Area ===
- 929,969 km^{2} (359,063 sq mi)

=== Population ===
- Total population: 45,232,171
- Total Catholic population: 1,005,600
- Parishes: 17
- Diocesan priests: 14
- Priests belonging to Religious Institutes: 55
- Total Priests: 65
- Permanent deacons living in the diocese: 0
- Professed non-ordained Male Religious belonging to Religious Institutes: 2
- Professed Female Religious belonging to Religious Institutes: 50

== List of churches under the jurisdiction of the vicar ==
=== United Arab Emirates ===
Abu Dhabi - St. Joseph's Cathedral and St. Francis Church, Abu Dhabi

Mussafah - St. Paul's Church

Al Ain - St. Mary's Church

Ruwais - St. John the Baptist Church

Dubai - St. Mary's Catholic Church

Jebel Ali - St. Francis of Assisi Catholic Church

Sharjah - St. Michael's Catholic Church

Ras Al Khaimah - St. Anthony of Padua Church

Fujairah - Our Lady of Perpetual Help Church

=== Oman ===
Muscat - Holy Spirit Church, Sts. Peter and Paul Church

Salalah - St. Francis Xavier Church

Sohar - St. Anthony's Church

=== Yemen ===
Aden - Proto-Cathedral St. Francis of Assisi

Hodeidah - Sacred Heart Church

Sana'a - St. Mary Help of Christians Church

Taiz - St. Therese of the Child Jesus Church

== See also ==
- Apostolic Nunciature to Oman – Diplomatic post of the Holy See in Oman
- Apostolic Vicariate of Northern Arabia – Catholic missionary jurisdiction
- Catholic Church in the United Arab Emirates
- Catholic Church in Oman
- Catholic Church in Yemen
- Eugine Mattioli – Catholic missionary in Arabia
