= Dubai City Church =

Coordinates: 25.23788°N 55.31830°E

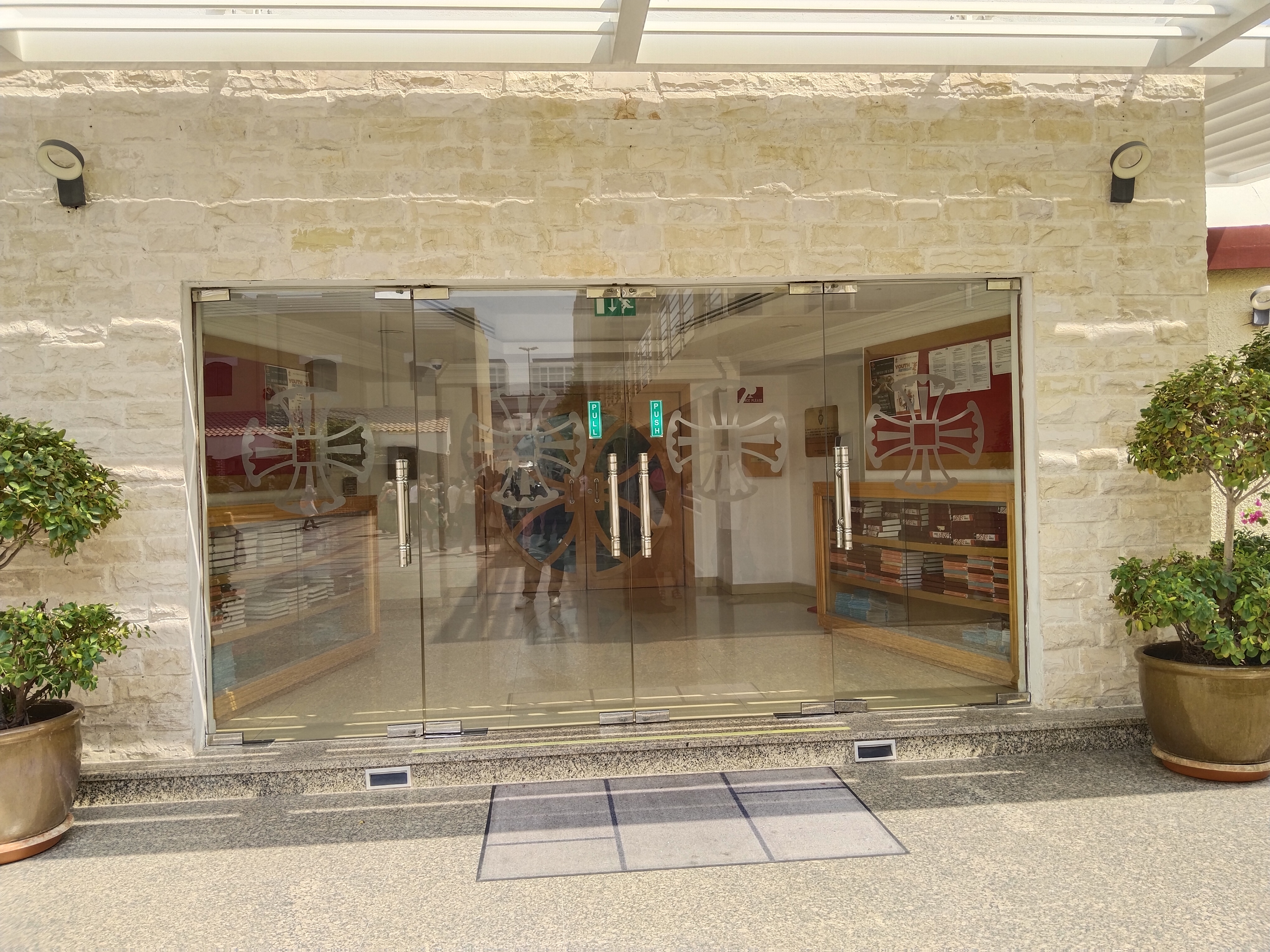
- Dubai City Church Office
- Dubai City Church
- Location: Dubai, UAE
- Country: UAE
- Denomination: Non-denominational, Charismatic
- Website: www.thedubaicitychurch.org

History
- Founded: 1999

Specifications
- Capacity: 1500

The Dubai City Church is a church in Emirate of Dubai.

== History ==
It was founded in 1999. It now comprises more than 1,000 people from different nationalities, meeting in the Holy Trinity Church Compound in Dubai every Saturday evening.

Église Évangélique de Dubai, the Russian Church of Dubai - attended by people from different nationalities, especially the Russian Community with Worship and Sermons in the Russian language, and The Abu Dhabi City Church are their associated ministries.

== See also ==
- Christianity in the United Arab Emirates
- Religion in the United Arab Emirates
