= Umm Al Emarat Park =

Park in Abu Dhabi, United Arab Emirates

Coordinates: 24°27′07″N 54°22′52″E

Umm Al Emarat Park, previously known as Mushrif Park, is an urban park in Abu Dhabi, in the United Arab Emirates, centrally located on 15th Street between Airport Road and Karamah Street. First opened in 1982, entrance to the park was originally exclusive to women and children, but it has since become accessible to all visitors. Over 80,000 students have visited the park through its partnerships with 400 UAE schools, with the aim of teaching the youth about the country's ecosystem, and heritage, and wildlife.

== Design ==
The overall design of the new park honors the legacy of Sheikh Zayed bin Sultan Al Nahyan and his vision of preserving the United Arab Emirates cultural and natural history. The Design of the park was undertaken by the US engineering consultant S. A. Miro, Inc. when they acted as the lead consultant of the project from concept design phase until delivery and commissioning.

== Renaming ==
The park was renamed Umm Al Emarat Park in honour of Sheikha Fatima bint Mubarak, Chairwoman of the General Women’s Union (GWU), Supreme Chairwoman of the Family Development Foundation (FDF) and President of the Supreme Council for Motherhood and Childhood.

== Facilities ==
The park contains a 1200 metre long running track, an amphitheater used for outdoor concerts and other public events such as movies, sports screening, cultural dances, music concerts or a community theatre performance, and multiple restaurants and food trucks. There is also an annual food festival to which many global and local celebrity chefs are invited, as well as musical acts.

The Park also has a petting zoo featuring native animals such as camels as well as ponies, rabbits, tortoises, pygmy goats, and emus.

== Awards ==
The Park was awarded the Green Flag Award in 2016.

In 2019, the Park broke the Guinness world record for the "most varieties of desserts on display".
