= St. Michael's Catholic Church, Sharjah =

Roman Catholic church in Sharjah, UAE

St. Michael's Church
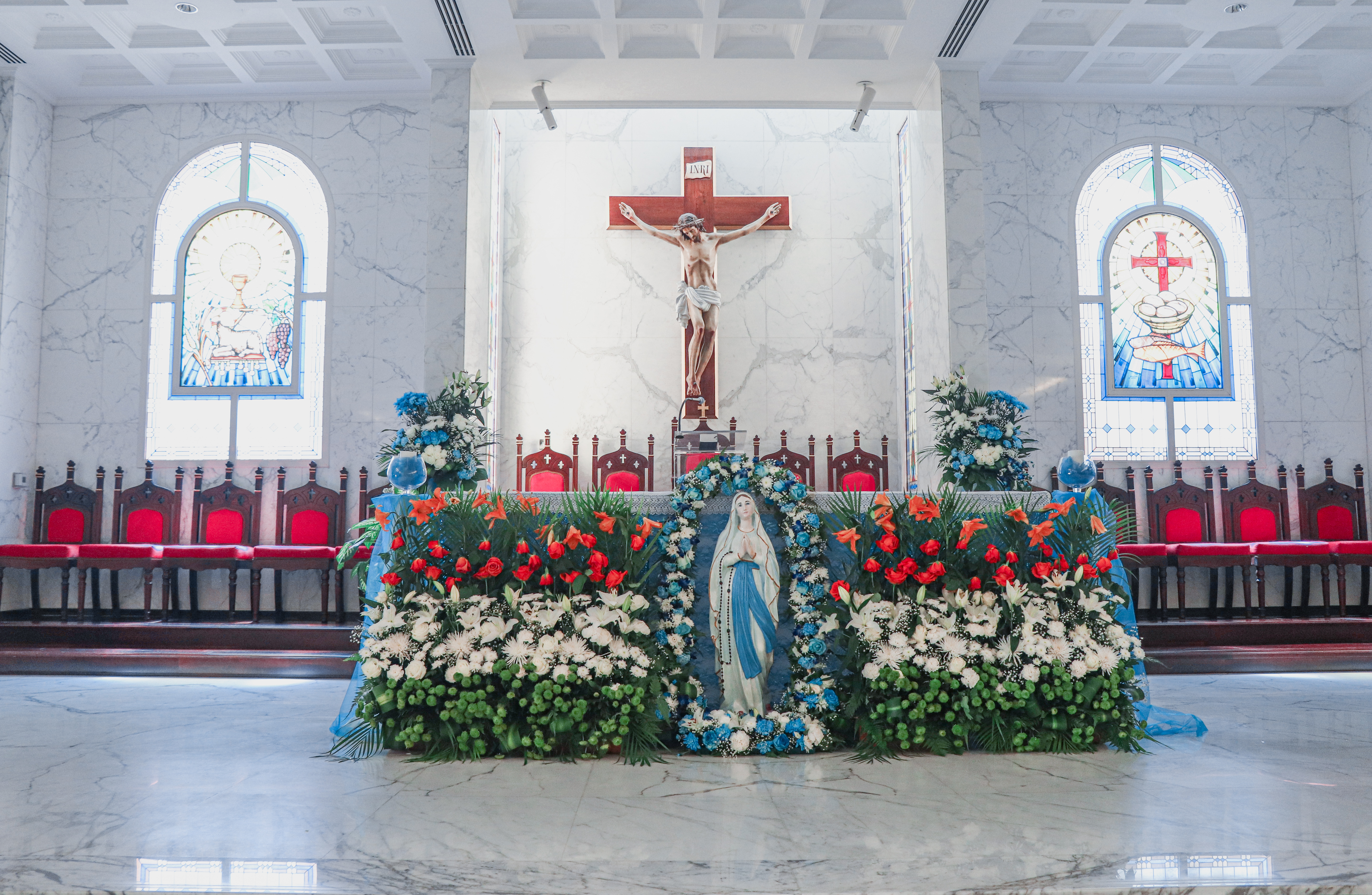
- St. Michael's Catholic Church in Sharjah

- Location within United Arab Emirates
- 25.35001°N 55.40293°E
- Address: 15 Abdullah Bin Anees St., Halwan Suburb, Al Yarmook, Sharjah
- Country: United Arab Emirates
- Language(s): English, Konkani, Malayalam, Tamil, Arabic, Urdu, Sinhalese, Tagalog
- Denomination: Catholic Church
- Sui iuris church: Latin Church
- Website: stmichaelssharjah.org

History
- Founded: 1971
- Consecrated: 2 October 1997

Administration
- Parish: Sharjah parish

St. Michael's Church (Arabic: كنيسة القديس ميخائيل الكاثوليكية) in Sharjah, United Arab Emirates, is a Roman Catholic church situated in Halwan Suburb of Al Yarmook area of Sharjah, founded in 1971. As of January 2023 the church is headed by Fr. Savarimuthu Antony Samy.

== History ==
The first St. Michael's Church was founded by an Italian Capuchin, Fr. Barnabas Maddii, in 1971 and was originally just a small chapel close to the British Airforce base. In 1973 Fr. Barnabas shifted it into the British officers' mess. The kitchen of the church was converted into the Parish House.

Father Barnabas was succeeded by Fathers Attilio, Edmund, Antonino, Felicio, Godwin and Angelo. The congregation increased along with the space to accommodate all of the parishioners.

The new Church was built by Fr. Angelo Fiumicelli and his team, under the supervision of Bishop Bernard Gremoli. It was consecrated on 2 October 1997 by Cardinal Artinze from the Vatican, with Fr. Angelo as the first parish priest.

When Fr. Angelo returned to Italy after 18 years in St. Michael's Church and 54 years in the Vicariate of Arabia, Bishop Paul Hinder appointed Fr. Ani Xavier as parish priest on 6 July 2007, with co-pastors Fr. Rodson, Fr. Antonio, Fr. Biju and Fr. Felicio. 35 prayer groups gather weekly, and Masses are conducted in 8 languages.
