= Apostolic Nunciature to Oman =

Diplomatic post of the Holy See in Oman

The Apostolic Nunciature to the Sultanate of Oman is the ecclesiastical office of the Catholic Church and the diplomatic post of the Holy See in Oman established in February 2023. The title Apostolic Nuncio to Oman is held by the prelate appointed Apostolic Nuncio to Egypt; he resides in Egypt.

== Papal representatives to Oman ==
- Nicolas Thévenin (22 May 2023 – present)

== See also ==
- Apostolic Delegation to the Arabian Peninsula – Diplomatic Mission of the Holy See
- Apostolic Vicariate of Southern Arabia – Catholic Missionary Jurisdiction
- Catholic Church in Oman
