= Diocese of Cyprus and the Gulf =

Diocese of the Anglican Communion

Location
- Country: Cyprus, Bahrain, Iraq, Kuwait, Oman, Qatar and Yemen
- Ecclesiastical province: Episcopal Church in Jerusalem and the Middle East

Statistics
- Congregations: 23

Information
- Denomination: Anglicanism
- Cathedral: St. Paul's Cathedral, Nicosia; St. Christopher's Cathedral, Bahrain

Current leadership
- Bishop: Sean Semple

Map
- Diocese of Jerusalem Diocese of Cyprus and the Persian Gulf Diocese of Iran

Website
- cypgulf.org

The Diocese of Cyprus and the Gulf is one of three dioceses in the Episcopal Church in Jerusalem and the Middle East, a province of the Anglican Communion. The diocese covers Cyprus and the Arabian Peninsula, Iraq and Yemen. The bishop in Cyprus and the Gulf is the ordinary of the diocese. In every part of the diocese, except in Cyprus and Iraq, the congregations are largely expatriate, with many Christians from Pakistan, India, Sri Lanka, the Philippines and the African continent. The diocese is linked to the Diocese of Exeter in England and the Diocese of Thika in Kenya. It is divided into the Archdeaconry of Cyprus and the Archdeaconry of the Gulf.

== List of bishops in Cyprus and the Persian Gulf ==
Arms of the Diocese of Cyprus and the Gulf

(Any dates appearing in italics indicate de facto continuation of office. The start date of tenure below is the date of appointment or succession. Where known, the date of installation and ordination as bishop are listed in the notes together with the post held prior to appointment.)

Tenure	Name	Notes
1976 to 1981	Leonard Ashton	Inaugural bishop; died 2001
1981 to 1986	Henry Wylie Moore	General secretary, Church Missionary Society, 1986–89, retired as bishop in 1991; died 2025
1986 to 1996	John Brown	Briefly rural dean of Grimsby (2003 to 2004); died 2011
1997 to 2007	Clive Handford	Now an assistant bishop, Diocese of Ripon and Leeds
2007 to 2023	Michael Lewis	Formerly bishop of Middleton
2024 to present	Sean Semple	

== Churches ==
Gulf Churches

United Arab Emirates:

- Christ Church, Jebel Ali
- Holy Trinity Church, Dubai
- St Luke Church, Ras Al Khaimah
- St Martin Church, Sharjah
- St Nicholas' Church, Fujairah
- St Andrew Church, Abu Dhabi
- St Thomas Church, Al Ain

Kuwait:

- St Paul Church – Kuwait

Iraq:

- St. George Church – Baghdad

Qatar:

- Church of the Epiphany, Doha – Qatar

Bahrain:

- St Christopher's and Awali Church, Bahrain

Yemen:

- Christ Church, Aden, Yemen

Cyprus

- St. Barnabas church, Limassol
- St Helena Church, Larnaca
- St Lazarus Church, Pissouri
- St Paul's Cathedral, Nicosia
- St Andrew's Church Kyrenia
- St. John's Church Deryneia
- Christ Church Ayia Napa
- St Mark Church, Famagusta
- Anglican Church of Paphos

== See also ==
- Chaplaincy of Dubai, Sharjah and the Northern Emirates
- The Mission to Seafarers

== Sources ==
- Who's Who 2008 London, A&C Black, 2007 ISBN 978-0-7136-8555-8
