= Al Mushrif =

Neighborhood in abu dhabi

Al Mushrif المشرف Mushrif
- City
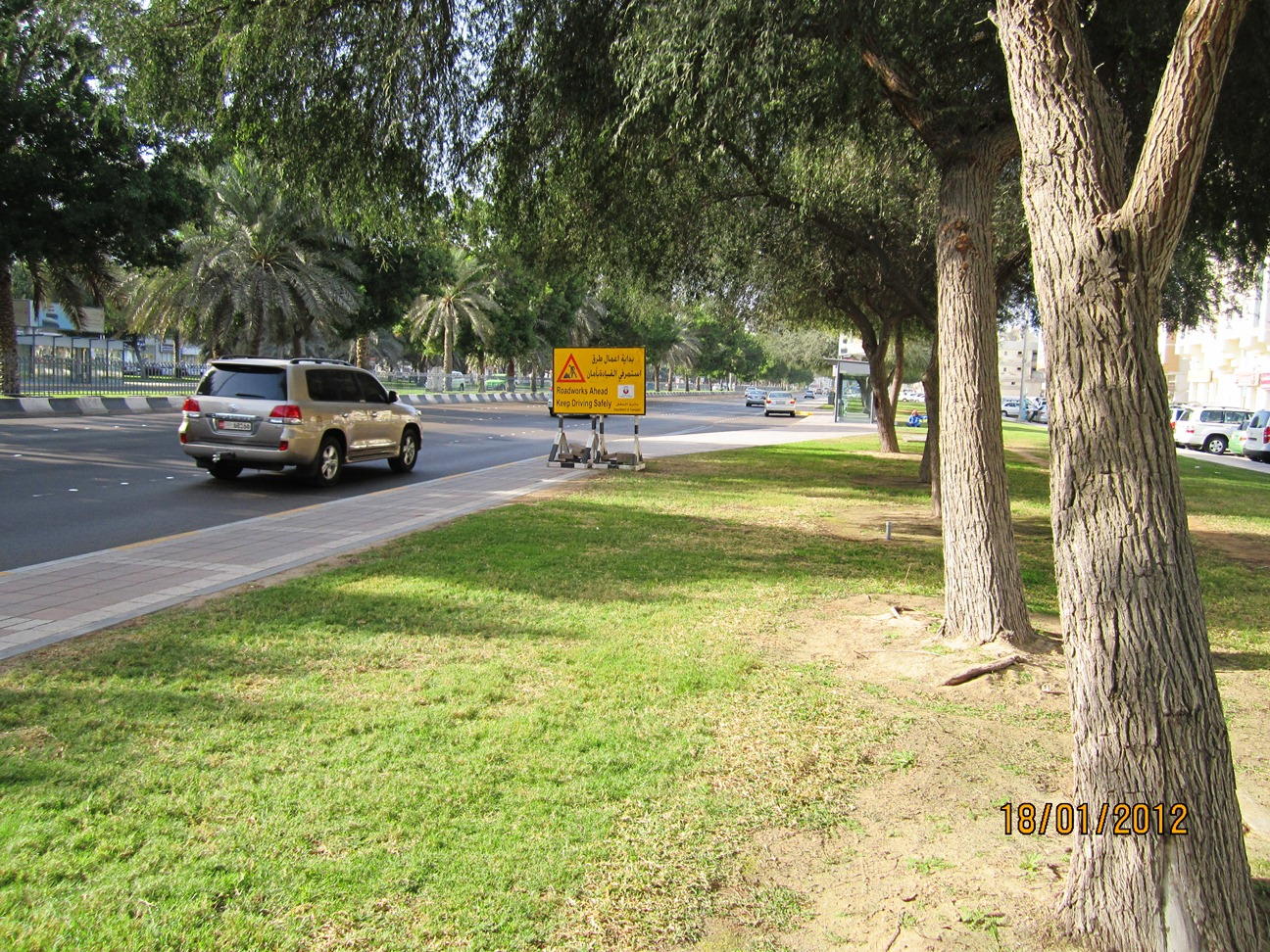
- Abu Dhabi City zone, Mushrif street road, going through Mushrif

- Location in the UAE Al Mushrif (Middle East) Al Mushrif (Asia)
- Coordinates: 24.4403652°N 54.3768996°E
- Country: United Arab Emirates
- Emirate: Abu Dhabi
- Municipal region: Abu Dhabi Region

Government
  - Type: Monarchy
  - Ruler: Mohamed bin Zayed Al Nahyan
- Time zone: UTC+4 (UAE standard time)

Al Mushrif is a central neighborhood in the city of Abu Dhabi zone one, United Arab Emirates. Al-Mushrif is located in an area between Sheikh Rashid Bin Saeed Street "Airport Road" and Arabian Gulf Street, which extends to Mussafah Bridge. It is the location of the Al Mushrif Palace and Umm Al Emarat Park, as well as Mushrif Mall. It also contains the Women's Handicrafts Centre, demonstrating practices such as saddu (carpet weaving) and talli (embroidering).
