= St. Joseph's Cathedral, Abu Dhabi =

Seat of The Apostolic Vicar of Southern Arabia

St. Joseph's Cathedral
- كاتدرائية القديس يوسف
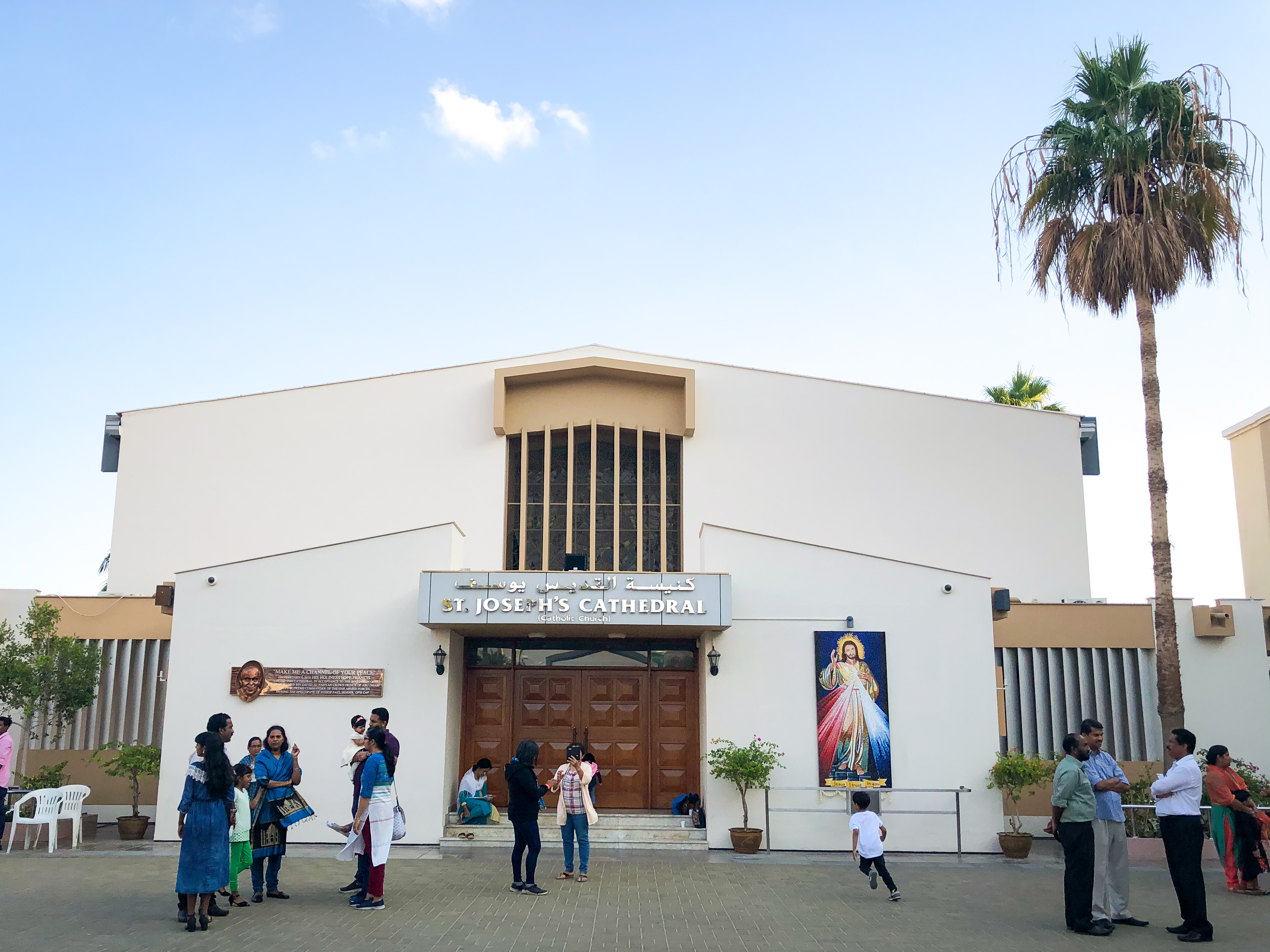
- St. Joseph's Cathedral
- 24.449125831605784°N 54.38534929744973°E
- Location: Al Mushrif, Abu Dhabi
- Country: United Arab Emirates
- Denomination: Catholic Church
- Sui iuris church: Latin Church
- Religious institute: Order of Friars Minor Capuchin (OFM Cap)
- Website: www.stjosephsabudhabi.org

History
- Status: Cathedral and Parish Church
- Founded: 22 June 1963; 63 years ago (in present-day Corniche); 16 August 1977; 49 years ago (in present-day Al Mushrif)
- Founder: Barnabas Madii
- Dedication: 1965; 61 years ago (in present-day Corniche); 25 February 1983; 43 years ago (in present-day Al Mushrif)
- Events: 14 October 2014; 12 years ago (Inauguration of St. Therese Church)

Architecture
- Functional status: Active
- Groundbreaking: 10 February 1964; 62 years ago (in present-day Corniche); 19 March 1981; 45 years ago (in present-day Al Mushrif)
- Completed: 24 December 1964; 61 years ago (in present-day Corniche; 24 December 1982; 43 years ago (in present-day Al Mushrif)

Administration
- Diocese: Apostolic Vicariate of Southern Arabia
- Deanery: United Arab Emirates

Clergy
- Bishop(s): Paolo Martinelli, OFM Cap.
- Rector: Chito Bunda Bartolo, OFM Cap.

Saint Joseph's Cathedral (Arabic: كاتدرائية القديس يوسف) is the seat of the Apostolic Vicar of Southern Arabia and is one of five Catholic churches in the Emirate of Abu Dhabi The first church was built in 1962 in the Corniche, on land donated by Sheikh Shakhbut, then-ruler of Abu Dhabi.

Masses are said in Arabic and the languages of expatriate populations in the country, primarily English, French, German, Italian, Konkani, Malayalam, Sinhalese, Spanish, Tagalog, Tamil, and Urdu.

== History ==
On 30 January 2005 Paul Hinder was ordained as bishop.

A significant section of the parish complex was demolished at the beginning of 2013 to give way for the construction of St. Therese of The Child Jesus Church.

On 2 July 2022, Paolo Martinelli was canonically installed as the Vicar of Southern Arabia in the cathedral, succeeding Hinder.

On 5 February 2019 Pope Francis made a private visit to the cathedral. He addressed the people summoned to visit him, mainly consisting of the needy, people of determination and altar servers.
