= Paul Hinder =

Swiss Catholic prelate (born 1942)

His Excellency, The Most Reverend Paul Hinder OFMCap
- Vicar Apostolic Emeritus of Southern Arabia
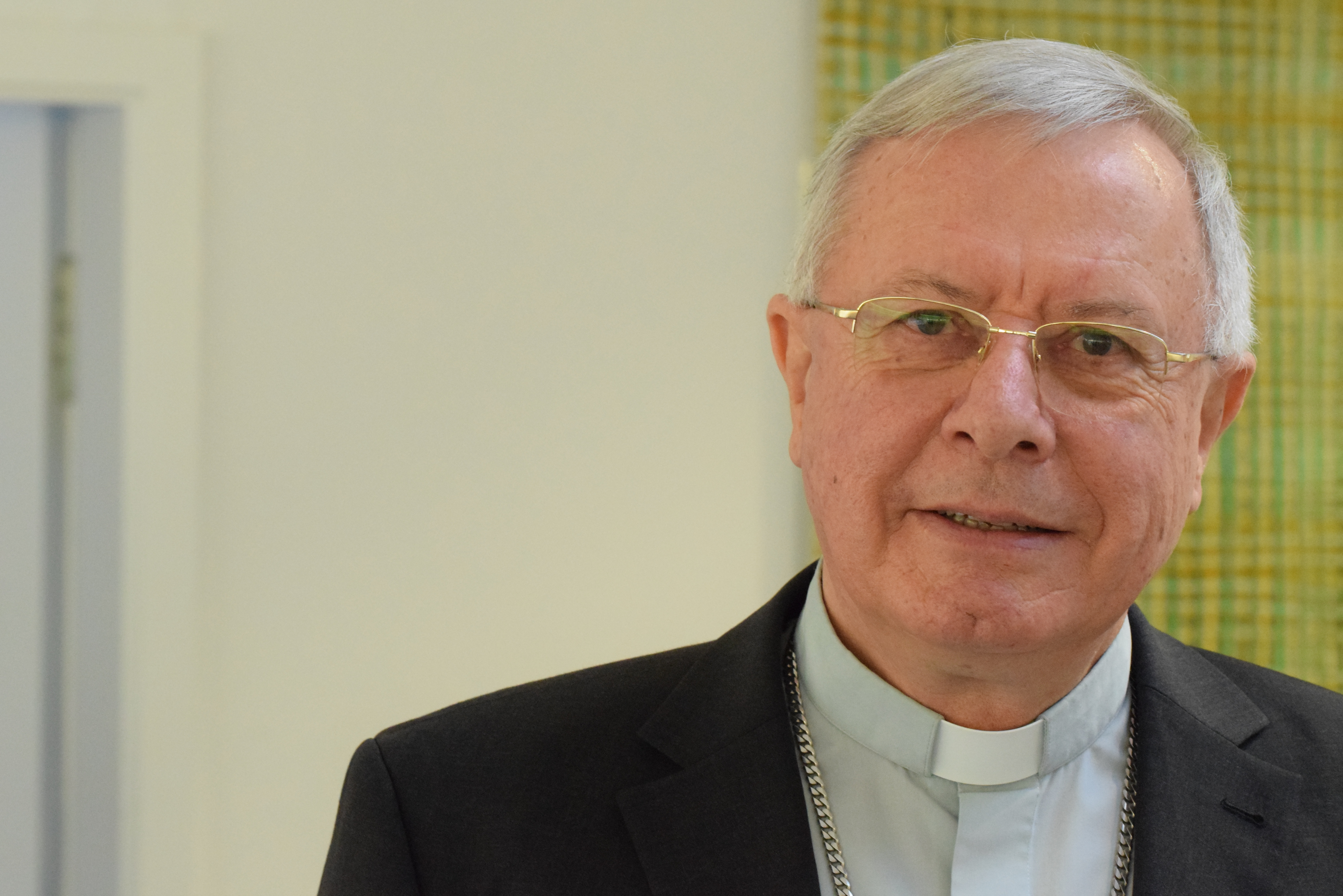
- Church: Catholic Church
- See: Vicariate Apostolic of Southern Arabia
- Installed: 31 May 2011
- Term ended: 2 July 2022
- Predecessor: Giovanni Bernardo Gremoli
- Successor: Paolo Martinelli
- Other post: Titular Bishop of Macon
- Previous posts: Apostolic Vicar of Southern Arabia (2011‍–‍2022); Vicar Apostolic of Arabia (2005‍–‍2011); Auxiliary Bishop of Arabia (2003‍–‍2005); Apostolic Administrator of Northern Arabia (2020‍–‍2023)

Orders
- Ordination: 4 July 1967
- Consecration: 30 January 2004 by Crescenzio Sepe

Personal details
- Born: 22 April 1942 (age 84) Bussnang, Thurgau, Switzerland
- Motto: Iustitia et Pax et Gaudium (Latin for 'Justice and Peace and Joy')

Ordination history of Paul Hinder
History
Episcopal consecration
- Principal consecrator: Cardinal Crescenzio Sepe, OFMCap
- Co-consecrators: Giuseppe De Andrea, Giovanni Bernardo Gremoli

Styles of Paul Hinder
- Reference style: His Excellency; The Most Reverend
- Spoken style: Your Excellency
- Religious style: Bishop

Paul Hinder, OFMCap (born 22 April 1942) is a Swiss Catholic prelate. He is the Vicar Apostolic Emeritus of Southern Arabia and the Titular Bishop of ancient Diocese of Mâcon. Hinder was previously appointed as an auxiliary bishop in the former Apostolic Vicariate of Arabia on 30 January 2004.

== Early life ==
Paul Hinder was born in Bussnang, Switzerland, on 22 April 1942 to Wilhelm Hinder and Agnes Meile. He joined the Order of Friars Minor Capuchin in 1962 and was ordained a priest on 4 July 1967. After specialized studies in canon law in Munich and Fribourg, he obtained his doctorate in theology in 1976. He was active as a professor, in the formation of young Capuchins, later as provincial in Switzerland and as General Councilor in Rome for the worldwide Capuchin Order.

== Bishop ==
On 20 December 2003, Hinder was appointed Auxiliary Bishop of Arabia and was ordained bishop on 30 January 2004 in Abu Dhabi. On 21 March 2005, he succeeded Giovanni Bernardo Gremoli as Vicar Apostolic of Arabia (UAE, Oman, Yemen, Qatar, Bahrain, Saudi Arabia). After the Vicariate of Arabia was divided into the Northern and Southern vicariates in 2011, Hinder was appointed to the Apostolic Vicariate of Southern Arabia (UAE, Oman, Yemen).

Hinder is a member of the Pontifical Council for the Pastoral Care of Migrants and Itinerant Peoples, a consultor to the Congregation for the Evangelization of Peoples, and the Pontifical Council for Interreligious Dialogue. He is also a member of the Conference of the Latin Bishops of the Arab Regions.

On 13 May 2020, he was named as apostolic administration "sede vacante et ad nutum Sanctae Sedis" of Northern Arabia (Kuwait, Bahrain, Qatar, and Saudi Arabia). The appointment was announced through a decree and signed by Luis Antonio Tagle, Prefect of the Congregation for the Evangelization of Peoples. On 23 January 2023, Pope Francis appointed Aldo Berardi, OSST as the Apostolic Vicar of Northern Arabia succeeding Camillo Ballin, MCCJ, who died on 12 April 2020.

On 1 May 2022, Pope Francis accepted the resignation of Hinder and appointed Paulo Martinelli OFMCap to take his place as the Vicar Apostolic of Southern Arabia.

Catholic Church titles
Preceded by Giovanni Bernardo Gremoli	Apostolic Vicar of Arabia; 21 March 2005 to 31 May 2011	Position Dissolved
Position Established	Apostolic Vicar of Southern Arabia; 31 May 2011 to 1 May 2021	Succeeded by Paolo Martinelli
Preceded by Camillo Ballin	Apostolic Administrator of Northern Arabia; 13 May 2020 to 28 January 2023	Succeeded by Aldo Berardi
