= Paolo Martinelli (bishop) =

Italian prelate of the Catholic Church (born 1958)

His Excellency, The Most Reverend Paolo Martinelli OFM Cap.
- Vicar Apostolic of Southern Arabia
- Church: Latin Church
- See: Vicariate Apostolic of Southern Arabia
- Appointed: 1 May 2022
- Installed: 2 July 2022
- Predecessor: Paul Hinder
- Other post: Titular Bishop of Musti in Numidia (2014–)
- Previous posts: Auxiliary Bishop of Milan (2014–2022); President, Episcopal Commission for the Clergy and Consecrated Life of the Episcopal Conference of Italy (2021–2022); President, Mixed Commission of Bishops-Religious-Secular Institutes of the Episcopal Conference of Italy (2021–2022)

Personal details
- Born: 22 October 1958 (age 68) Milan, Italy
- Residence: The Bishop's House; St. Joseph's Cathedral; Abu Dhabi, UAE
- Education: Pontifical Gregorian University
- Motto: Gloria Dei Vivens Homo (The Glory of God is Man Fully Alive)

Styles of Paolo Martinelli
- Reference style: His Excellency; The Most Reverend
- Spoken style: Your Excellency
- Religious style: Bishop

Ordination history of Paolo Martinelli
History
Priestly ordination
- Ordained by: Renato Corti
Episcopal consecration
- Principal consecrator: Angelo Scola
- Co-consecrators: Dionigi Tettamanzi, Mario Enrico Delpini

Paolo Martinelli, OFM Cap. (born 22 October 1958) is an Italian Catholic prelate who has served as Vicar Apostolic of Southern Arabia since 2022. He is a member of the Order of Friars Minor Capuchin.

== Early life ==
He studied theology in Milan and was ordained a priest on 7 September 1985. He studied at the Pontifical Gregorian University, where he obtained a licentiate in fundamental theology and subsequently a doctorate in theology with a thesis on the thought of Hans Urs von Balthasar.

He was a member of the faculty of Theology at the Pontifical Gregorian University (since 1992) and at the Pontifical University of Antonianum(since 1993), where he was also the Dean of the Franciscan Institute Spirituality from 2004 to 2014. Since 2006, he was also the Consultor of the Congregation for the Institutes of Consecrated Life and Societies of Apostolic Life. He has also been the Consultor of the General Secretariat of the Synod of Bishops, and since 2012, he has been a Consultor of the Congregation for the Doctrine of the Faith.

== Bishop ==
On 24 May 2014, Pope Francis appointed Martinelli as the auxiliary bishop of the Metropolitan Archdiocese of Milan and the titular bishop of Musti in Numidia. He was ordained bishop in the Metropolitan Cathedral-Basilica of the Nativity of Saint Mary on 28 June 2014. He chose “Gloria Dei Vivens Homo” (The Glory of God is Man Fully Alive) as his episcopal motto. Since 2014, he has been the Episcopal Vicar for Consecrated Life. Monsignor Paolo Martinelli is also a member of the Italian Bishops Conference since 2015 and was elected the President of the Episcopal Commission for the Clergy and Consecrated Life of the conference in 2021. Msgr. Martinelli has also authored and edited several books and articles on spiritual theology and the various vocations in the Church.

In May 2022, Martinelli was appointed by Pope Francis as the apostolic vicar of Southern Arabia, succeeding Paul Hinder. He was formally installed as apostolic vicar on 2 July 2022.

Catholic Church titles
Preceded by Pierantonio Tremolada	Auxiliary Bishop of Milan; 24 May 2014 to 1 May 2022	Succeeded by TBA
Preceded by Paul Hinder	Apostolic Vicar of Southern Arabia; 1 May 2022 to Present	Incumbent
