= Irreligion in Yemen =

Irreligion in Yemen is uncommon among Yemenis, as Islam is the country's predominant faith. It is difficult to quantify the number of atheists in Yemen, as they are not officially counted in the census of the country. There is a great stigma attached to being an atheist in Yemen, so many Yemeni atheists communicate with each other via the internet.

The punishment for leaving Islam in Yemen is the death penalty.

== Persecution by Muslims ==
In response to the 2013 Sana'a attack, a Yemeni woman from Bajil in Hudaydah declared converting from Islam to Christianity and immediately, the government put her under investigations, after a chance timeout, sent her to a psychiatric hospital. By the end of 2013, a new page was founded on the Facebook and encouraging non-religious Yemenis to show up and not to get afraid of the wild community reaction.

There has been also a broad misconception between secularism and atheism or even being non-religious, many activists were kidnapped due to that confusion, examples including the following events:

- On 4 September 2015, a secular activist named Anwar Al-Wazir was kidnapped in Taiz in front of his family for being secular.
- On 26 April 2016, a 17-year old activist named Omar Bataweel was accused for atheism and killed in Aden. One of his famous quotes was "They accuse me of atheism! Oh you people, I see God in the flowers, and you see Him in the graveyards, that is the difference between me and you".
- On 15 May, 2017 Amjad Abdulrahman, a friend of Omar, was also murdered in Aden for apostasy. His family was prevented from burying him in his area and from doing Muslim funeral prayer.
- on 5 Sept, 2020 an 18-year old named Luai Saddam, found dead in his home just after one day of his controversial Facebook post. A picture showed him with a rope around his neck as if he has committed suicide while it is suspected he was murdered due to his anti-religion posts.

== See also ==
- Religion in Yemen
- Freedom of religion in Yemen
- Islam in Yemen
- Christianity in Yemen
- Demographics of Yemen
