= Missionaries of Charity attack in Aden =

Mass murder in Aden, Yemen

- Part of the Yemeni Civil War (2014–present) and the Aden unrest
- Missionaries of Charity attack in Aden (Yemen)
- Location: Aden, Yemen
- Date: 4 March 2016; 12:00 p.m.
- Target: Christians
- Attack type: Mass shooting, kidnapping
- Weapon: Firearms
- Deaths: 16
- Perpetrators: Islamic State of Iraq and the Levant (alleged, denied)
- No. of participants: 4

The Missionaries of Charity attack in Aden was a mass murder committed by unknown gunmen inside a nursing home in Aden, Yemen on 4 March 2016. 16 people were killed, including four Catholic nuns. An Indian priest, Tom Uzhunnalil, was kidnapped. The identities of the attackers are unknown. Media outlets published a statement attributed to Ansar al-Sharia, one of the active jihadist organizations in the country, denying any relation to the incident. The attackers reportedly belonged to the Yemen-based affiliate of the Islamic State (ISIS) group.

== Background ==
Christian presence in Yemen goes back to the fourth century AD to hold a number of Himyarites believers due to the efforts of Theophilos the Indian. Currently, there are no official statistics on their numbers, but estimated at between 3,000 and 25,000 people, and most of them are refugees or temporary residents.

Freedom of worship, conversion from Islam and establishing facilities dedicated for worship are not recognized in the Constitution or as laws or legal rights. At the same time, Wahabbi activities linked to Al-Islah were being facilitated, financed and encouraged from multiple fronts including the Ministry of Endowments and Guidance, which says that its tasks "to contribute to the development of Islamic awareness and circulation of the publication Education and Islamic morals and consolidation in the life of public and private citizens."

The Missionaries of Charity, founded by Mother Teresa, have worked in Aden since 1992, and the order has three other centers in Sana'a, Taiz and Hodeidah. Three Catholic nuns were killed in Hodeidah in 1998, two from India and the third from the Philippines, at the hands of a member of Al-Islah Abdullah al-Nashiri, arguing that they were calling for conversion to Christianity. In 2002, three Americans were killed in Baptists Hospital at the hands of another Al-Islah member named Abed Abdul Razak Kamel. Survivors say that the hospital was "a political football" often raised by Islamists (Al-Islah), who talked about it in mosques and hospital workers describing Hospital workers as "spies". But they emphasized that these opinions are a minority among Yemenis.

In December 2015, a Catholic church in Aden was destroyed. Since the escalation of the Yemeni crisis in March 2015, six priests from John Bosco remained, and twenty workers of charitable missions in the country, described by Pope Francis by the courage to fortitude amid war and conflict. He called the Apostolic Vicar of Southern Arabia to pray for all the oppressed and tortured, expelled from their homes, and killed unjustly. The Missionaries of Charity were not actively engaged in evangelization according to the testimonies of beneficiaries of its services.

== Attack ==
The attack on the house took place at 12:00pm local time, when two armed men had persuaded the guards to let them through the main gate having claimed they were going to visit their elderly mother. Once they entered, they began to shoot randomly, according to Indian officials at the Foreign Ministry.

Inside the building, nuns were preparing breakfast. Four of the five nuns sensed danger and tried to hide in a convent, where they were shot dead in an open area. All the rooms were stormed and the meeting tent was destroyed, as were statues and crucifixes in the small church. In one picture, two nuns are shown lying on the ground in a dirt yard, after having been shot execution-style. The attackers were dressed in a "semi-blue" uniform. According to the Catholic News Agency, the last prayer said by the nuns before they were killed says:

Lord, teach me to be generous. Teach me to serve you as you deserve; to give and not to count the cost, to fight and not to heed the wounds, to toil and not to seek for rest, to labor and not to ask for reward.

Sunita Kumar, a spokesman for the charity's mission, described the killers as "demented", adding "there is no other explanation as to why armed people would enter the premises of the home and shoot down innocent, harmless nurses who had dedicated their lives to serving others." Bishop Michael Lewis of the Anglican Church said the compound contained seventy or eighty elderly people, many destitute. The Cardinal Secretary of State Pietro Parolin commented that Pope Francis prayed that this pointless slaughter will awaken consciences, lead to a change of heart and inspire all parties to lay down their arms and take up the path of dialogue.

Pope Francis described the crime as "satanic", stating that the nuns were "martyrs of today", adding that they were killed by both the attackers, and a "globalization of indifference.". His statement was published, including the following quote:

In the name of God, he calls upon all parties in the present conflict to renounce violence, and to renew their commitment to the people of Yemen, particularly those most in need, whom the Sisters and their helpers sought to serve.

The Missionaries of Charity announced it would continue its work in Yemen despite the violence and danger.

== Victims ==
Deaths by nationality
Country	Number	Ref.
Yemen	7	
Ethiopia	5	
Rwanda	2	
India	1	
Kenya	1	
Total	16	

An Indian priest, Tom Ozhonaniel, was also kidnapped. Since, he later appeared in several videos chastising the lack of effort to release him and pleading for his life. In September 2017, he was rescued by Omani authorities, and it was reported he would soon return to his home in Kerala.

== See also ==
- Roman Catholicism in Yemen
- Protestantism in Yemen
- Persecution of Christians
- Religion in Yemen
- Islam in Yemen
- Religious intolerance
- Toleration
- Freedom of religion in Yemen
- List of massacres in Yemen
