= Religious denomination =

Identifiable religious subgroup with a common structure and doctrine

A religious denomination is a subgroup within a religion that operates under a common name and tradition, among other activities. The term refers to the various Christian denominations (for example, non-Chalcedonian, Eastern Orthodox, Catholic, and the branches of Protestantism, such as Lutheranism). It is also used to describe the five major branches of Judaism (Karaite Judaism, Orthodox, Conservative, Reform, and Reconstructionist). Within Islam, it can refer to the branches or sects (such as Sunni and Shia), as well as their various subdivisions, such as sub-sects, schools of jurisprudence, schools of theology and religious movements.

The world's largest religious denomination is Sunni Islam.

== Christianity ==
A Christian denomination is a generic term for a distinct religious body identified by traits such as a common name, structure, leadership and doctrine. Individual bodies, however, may use alternative terms to describe themselves, such as church or fellowship. Divisions between one group and another are defined by doctrine and church authority; issues such as the biblical interpretation, the authority of apostolic succession, eschatology, and papal primacy often separate one denomination from another. Groups of denominations often sharing broadly similar beliefs, practices and historical ties are known as branches of Christianity.

The largest Christian denomination is the Catholic Church.

== Hinduism ==
In Hinduism, the major deity or philosophical belief identifies a denomination, which also typically has distinct cultural and religious practices. The major denominations include Shaivism, Shaktism, Vaishnavism and Smartism.

== Islam ==
Historically, Islam was divided into three major sects, well known as Sunni, Khawarij and Shi'ah. Nowadays, Sunnis constitute about 90% of the overall Muslim population; the Shi'ahs are around 10%, while Ibadis, from the Kharijites, have diminished to a level below 0.15%.

Today, many of the Shia sects are extinct. The major surviving Imamah-Muslim Sects are Usulism (about 8.5%), Nizari Ismailism (about 1%), Alevism (0.5–1%), and Musta'li Ismaili (with nearly 0.1% whose Taiyabi adherents reside in Gujarat state in India and Karachi city in Pakistan. The other existing groups include Zaydi Shi'a of Yemen whose population is nearly 0.5% of the world's Muslim population. There are also significant diaspora populations in Europe, North America, the Far East and East Africa).

On the other hand, new Muslim sects like African American Muslims, Ahmadi Muslims (with nearly around 1%), non-denominational Muslims, and Quranist Muslims were later independently developed.

A survey by the Pew Research Center suggests that up to 25% of Muslims globally self-identify as non-denominational Muslims.

== Judaism ==
Jewish religious movements, sometimes called "denominations" or "branches", include different groups which have developed among Jews from ancient times. Today, the main division is between the Orthodox, Reform and Conservative lines, with several smaller movements alongside them. This threefold denominational structure is mainly present in the United States, while in Israel the fault lines are between the religious Orthodox and the non-religious.

The movements differ in their views on various issues. These issues include the level of observance, the methodology for interpreting and understanding Jewish law, biblical authorship, textual criticism and the nature or role of the messiah (or messianic age). Across these movements there are marked differences in liturgy, especially in the language in which services are conducted, with the more traditional movements emphasizing Hebrew. The sharpest theological division occurs between Orthodox and non-Orthodox Jews who adhere to other denominations, such that the non-Orthodox movements are sometimes referred to collectively as the "liberal denominations" or "progressive streams."

== Multi-denominational ==
The term "multi-denominational" may describe (for example) a religious event that includes several religious denominations from sometimes unrelated religious groups. Many civic events include religious portions led by representatives from several religious denominations to be as inclusive or representational as possible of the expected population or audience. For example: the Sunday thanksgiving mass at Campamento Esperanza (English: Camp Hope) in Chile, where services were led by both a Roman Catholic priest and by an Evangelical preacher during the Chilean 2010 Copiapó mining accident.

Chaplains - frequently ordained clergy of any religion - are often assigned to secular organizations to provide spiritual support to its members who may belong to any of many different religions or denominations. Many of these chaplains, particularly those serving with the military or other large secular organizations, are specifically trained to minister to members of many different faiths, even faiths with opposing religious ideology from that of the chaplain's own faith.

Military organizations that do not have large numbers of members from several individual smaller but related denominations will routinely hold multi-denominational religious services, often generically called "Protestant" Sunday services, so minority Protestant denominations are not left out or unserved.

Multi-denominational may also refer to a person's faith, in that their belief or affiliation crosses over formal boundaries that strict adherents would not consider. For instance, someone may have been raised Protestant but find Buddhist or Hindu scripture or practice to be helpful without fully abandoning their affiliation with Christianity and therefore may not consider themselves fully Hindu or Buddhist, nor do they consider themselves fully Christian as much as strict adherents. This would not be the same as pantheism as they may not feel any affiliation to say islam. They may class themselves as Christian-Buddhist or Advaita-Christian or just simply spiritual but not religious. They may pray but not meditate or vice versa or both and they may benefit from a wide range of scripture and they may attend both Church and temple.

== See also ==
- Sect
- Attempted schisms in the Baháʼí Faith
- Christian denomination
- Ecumenism
- Hindu denominations
- Interfaith dialogue
- Sectarianism
- Sectarian violence
- Islamic schools and branches
- Jain schools and branches
- Jewish religious movements
- List of Gnostic sects
- List of religions and spiritual traditions
- Mansions of Rastafari
- Non-denominational
- Religious syncretism
- Schism
- Schools of Buddhism
- Sects of Sikhism
- Shinto sects and schools
- Sociological classifications of religious movements
- Taoist schools
