= Mary Help of Christians Church =

Mary Help of Christians Church, or similarly named Christian church buildings with the patron of Mary Help of Christians, may refer to:

== Asia ==
=== Hong Kong ===
- Mary Help of Christians Church, Kowloon, Kau Pui Lung, Kowloon

=== India ===
- Mary Help of Christians Cathedral, Kohima, Nagaland

=== Yemen ===
- St. Mary Help of Christians Church, Sanaa

== Europe ==
=== United Kingdom ===
- Our Lady Help of Christians Church, Luton, Bedfordshire
- St. Mary Help Of Christians, Holyhead, Anglesey, Wales

== North America ==
=== United States ===
- Our Lady Help of Christians Church, Philadelphia, Pennsylvania
- Holy Hill National Shrine of Mary, Help of Christians, Wisconsin
- Abbey Basilica of Mary Help of Christians, North Carolina
- St. Mary Help of Christians Church (Aiken, South Carolina)
- St. Mary Help of Christians Church (St. Augusta, Minnesota)
