= Christianity in Yemen =

Christianity is a minority religion in Yemen. Article 51 of the Yemeni constitution mentions religious liberty. There are three churches in Aden.

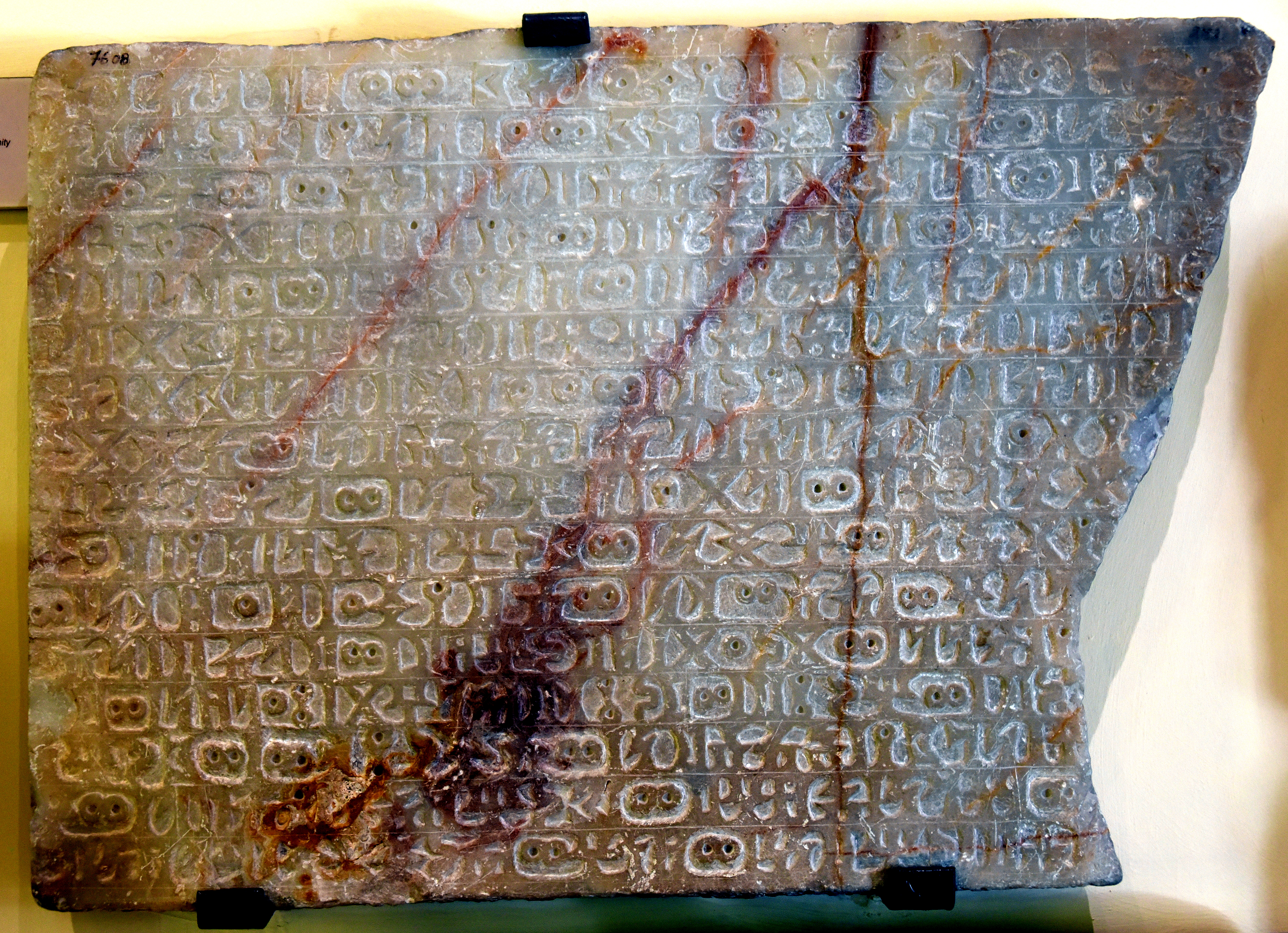
Marble plate inscribed with an ancient South Arabian script about Christianity. From Yemen, 6th century CE. Ancient Orient Museum, Istanbul

== Pre-Islamic period ==
Christianity was a widespread religion on the territory of contemporary Yemen as early as the 5th century, before arrival of Islam in Yemen. The most prominent site of Christianity in Yemen became the oasis of Najran, giving rise to the Christian community of Najran. Persecutions also began in the late 5th century, already recounted in stories like the Martyrdom of Azqir. In the early 520s, the Jewish king of Himyar, Dhu Nuwas, instigated a massacre of Najran's Christians, causing internal outrage in the Christian community and instigating the Ethiopian invasion of Yemen, which brought about Christian Aksumite rule over the region for several decades in the 6th century. Najran had a bishop in this time, and many pieces of Christian architecture were constructed, such as the Kaaba of Najran.

== Present situation ==
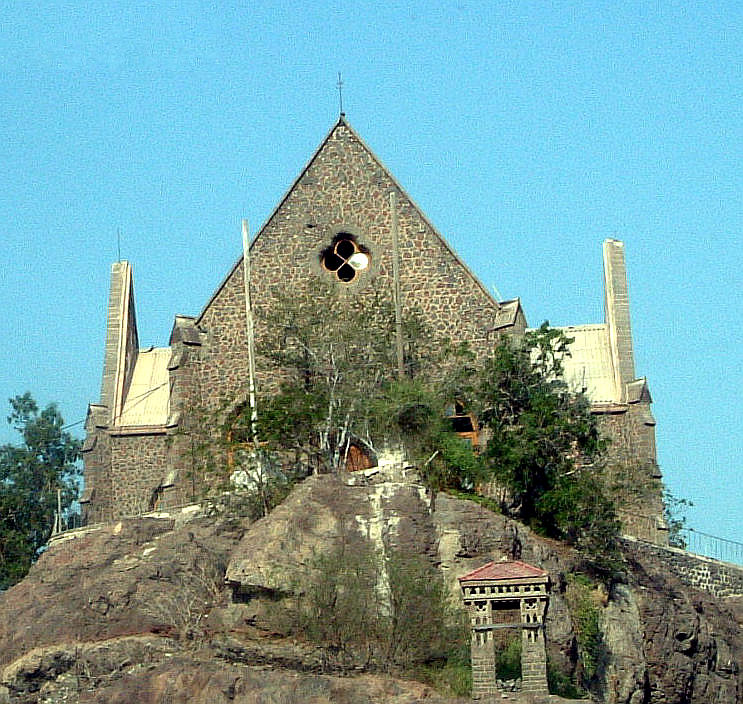
Former Anglican church in Aden

In 2023, Christians as a group make up 0.06% of the country's population. The World Christian Encyclopedia, Second edition, Volume 1, states that the Ethiopian Orthodox Church and the Russian Orthodox Church are the largest denominations in Yemen. A 2015 study estimated that there were 400 Christians from a Muslim background in the country. Pew-Templeton estimated the number of Christians in Yemen at 40,000 in 2013.

In 2020, there were four hundred Catholics in the country, which included one priest and eight nuns. There are also approximately 2,500 Catholics who are temporary foreign workers or refugees.

In Aden, there are one Catholic church and two Anglican churches. In San'a there are weekly Protestant services, with 436 Protestants. Christian missions from several countries are active in Yemen. There are hospitals that belong to foreign Christian institutions.

Protestants make up less than 1% of the population of Yemen. In 2006, an American Baptist congregation was affiliated with a hospital in Jibla; the Anglican Church runs two charitable clinics in Aden and it was noted that in the past peaceful relations between Christians and Muslims contributed to religious freedom. However, in 2020, Yemen is ranked as 'High' on the scale of state discrimination against minority religions and it is reported that Christians and other religious minorities are often discriminated against when attempting to access humanitarian aid.

Conversion from Islam to Christianity is not legally recognized by the state. Yemen was third on Open Doors' 2023 World Watch List, an annual ranking of the 50 countries where Christians face the most extreme persecution. In the same year, it was scored 1 out of 4 for religious freedom.

== See also ==
- Religion in Yemen
- Catholic Church in Yemen
- Protestantism in Yemen
- Freedom of religion in Yemen
- Missionaries of Charity attack in Aden
- Najran
