= Baháʼí Faith in Yemen =

Bahá’í Faith in Yemen
- البهائية في اليمن
- Classification: Bahá’í
- Region: Yemen
- Language: Arabic and other local languages
- Origin: c. 1844 (roots); Yemen (via early travel)
- Members: A few thousand (est.)

The Bahá’í Faith in Yemen is a small but active religious community that has been present in the country since the mid-nineteenth century. There are estimated to be a few thousand Bahá’ís in Yemen, including many from Yemeni tribes and prominent families, alongside long-time residents of Persian origin. Despite their small numbers, Yemeni Bahá’ís have contributed to national life through work in health care, engineering, education, reconciliation initiatives, youth development, and humanitarian relief, while facing severe repression—particularly in areas controlled by the Houthi authorities since 2014.

== History ==
=== Early origins (1844–1940s) ===
The Bahá’í Faith’s association with Yemen dates to the mid-nineteenth century. The Báb is recorded to have stopped at the port of Al-Mukhā (Mocha) on his way from Persia to Mecca for pilgrimage in 1844. Yemen later served as a travel corridor for Bahá’ís journeying from Persia to meet Baháʼu'lláh and ʻAbdu’l-Bahá and to visit the Bahá’í holy places, creating early opportunities for contact with Yemeni society.

=== Community formation (1940s–1990s) ===
From the 1940s and early 1950s several Bahá’ís settled with their families in Yemen, working in fields that were critically needed at the time—medicine, engineering and roads, education, and public services. Some settled later in 1970s. Among them were Dr. Kamal bin Haydara (a physician who served Socotra’s population and was granted Yemeni citizenship); engineer Badiullah Sanai, who was nationally recognized for his leadership in urban planning; and engineer Towfiq Al-Sakkaf, who served as Head of the Construction Department at the Ministry of Construction and Development during the period of Communist rule in South Yemen (PDRY).

The earliest known Local Spiritual Assemblies in Yemen were established in Sanaa in 1961 and in Aden in 1962, though it is likely that Bahá’í administrative structures existed earlier, possibly during the 1950s. The communist coup in South Yemen in 1969 led to the expulsion of foreigners—including Persian Bahá’ís—from the new People’s Democratic Republic of Yemen, while local community life continued in the north. As of today local Baha'is still live in the South, e.g. in Aden.

The first and only National Spiritual Assembly of the Bahá’ís of Yemen was founded in Sanaa in 1984, uniting all local assemblies in the country under a single national body despite Yemen’s ongoing political divisions, marking a milestone in community self-governance. Through the 1980s–1990s the community focused on literacy, education, youth, and village-level development, generally shunning partisan politics in accordance with Bahá’í teachings.

== Growth among native Yemenis and tribal communities ==
Beginning in the 2000s and accelerating after 2010, the Bahá’í Faith in Yemen experienced growth among native Yemenis, including in tribal areas. Several influential tribesmen associated with the al-Qur’ānī current (which emphasizes the Qur'an as the sole source of legislation) independently encountered Bahá’í teachings online and, after personal study, embraced the Faith. Prominent among them was Shaykh Waleed Ayyash, a decorated military figure, who—along with peers—introduced Bahá’í principles to family networks and fellow tribesmen. Many other members of well-known Yemeni families, some with notable records of government or military service, later identified themselves as Bahá’ís.

New Yemeni Bahá’ís emphasized applying principles such as unity, equality of women and men, the oneness of humanity, and service to the common good in collective action—organizing study circles, children’s classes, junior youth groups, and local service projects. These efforts brought tangible social transformation to neighborhoods and villages and broadened the community’s socio-cultural base well beyond its early pioneer origins.

Study circles, children’s classes, and junior youth groups are core educational activities of the Bahá’í community that promote spiritual and moral development across age groups. Study circles bring adults and youth together to explore Bahá’í teachings and engage in community service. Children’s classes (ages ~5–11) nurture virtues such as kindness and truthfulness, while junior youth groups (ages ~12–15) help adolescents strengthen their moral reasoning and contribute positively to society. Together, these programs form an integrated framework for lifelong spiritual education and community building.

== Social contributions ==
Despite conflict and economic collapse, Bahá’ís in Yemen have engaged in:

- Community-building and education: children’s classes, junior youth empowerment, adult study circles, and literacy programmes;
- Health services: continuing a legacy dating to the 1950s of medical care in underserved areas;
- Tribal reconciliation: dialogue and mediation initiatives among local leaders to reduce tensions;
- Humanitarian and disaster relief: neighbourhood-based relief, especially during escalations of conflict and displacement;
- Public discourse: non-partisan engagement with officials, tribal elders, academics, journalists, and human rights advocates on themes of unity, inclusion, and social cohesion.

== Persecution ==
=== 2008–2013: Onset of harassment ===
Harassment of Baha'is began in 2008 under the then-Sanaa authorities, when six Bahá’ís were detained and two were deported, amid clerical agitation. In December 2013, Yemeni Bahá’í Hamed Kamal bin Haydara was arrested on charges—including espionage—widely criticized as unfounded.

=== 2014–present: Houthi-controlled areas ===
After the Houthi takeover of Sanaa in September 2014, repression intensified and became systematic. Immediately after a hearing in Hamed bin Haydara’s case on 8 March 2015, security forces arrested two Baháʼí community members attending the trial, Nadim al-Sakkaf and his brother Nader Tawfiq al-Sakkaf. In August 2016, security forces raided an educational event organized by Yemeni Bahá’ís and the Nida Foundation, arresting over sixty people (men, women, and children), raiding homes, and confiscating documents and passports. In April 2017, arrest orders were issued for more than 25 Bahá’ís; detainees over 2016–2017 included Waleed Ayyash, Akram Ayyash, Badiullah Sanai, Wael al-Arieghie, and Kayvan Ghaderi.

On 2 January 2018, the Specialized Criminal Court in Sanaa sentenced Hamed bin Haydara to death and ordered the dissolution of Bahá’í administrative bodies, a ruling condemned by international organizations. In March 2018, Houthi leader Abdul-Malik al-Houthi publicly vilified the Bahá’í Faith in a televised address, escalating incitement by some officials and outlets.

=== 2020: Pardon and conditional releases ===
In March 2020, Houthi Supreme Political Council President Mahdi al-Mashat announced a pardon for bin Haydara and the release of five other detained Bahá’ís. Following negotiations, the six were freed on 30 July 2020 on the condition that they leave Yemen immediately. Subsequent court actions branded several released Bahá’ís as "fugitives", and proceedings against others continued.

=== 2023–2024: Mass raid and conditional releases ===
On 25 May 2023, armed Houthi forces raided a Bahá’í meeting in Sanaa, detaining 17 Bahá’ís (including five women) and confiscating devices and documents. International actors, including UN experts, condemned the arrests as violations of freedom of religion or belief. By August 2024, all 17 detainees had been released, though many under restrictive conditions such as bans on Bahá’í activity and communication, travel limits, and financial guarantees.

== Demographics ==
Accurate statistics are unavailable, but the Bahá’í International Community estimates a few thousand Bahá’ís in Yemen, living in both urban and rural settings and spread across governorates including Sanaa, Taiz, Hodeidah, Ibb, Aden, Mukalla, Dhale, Shabwah, and the Socotra archipelago. Where numbers permit, Bahá’ís elect Local Spiritual Assemblies and organize devotional meetings, children’s classes, and junior youth groups.

== International response ==
UN Special Rapporteurs and agencies have urged Yemeni authorities to protect the Bahá’ís' rights, beginning with calls in 2016 to halt "systematic harassment". Independent analysis has traced the community’s trajectory "from obscurity to persecution and exile", situating it within Yemen’s broader conflict dynamics.

== See also ==
- Baháʼí International Community
- Freedom of religion in Yemen
- Religion in Yemen
- Persecution of Baháʼís
