= Catholic Church in Yemen =

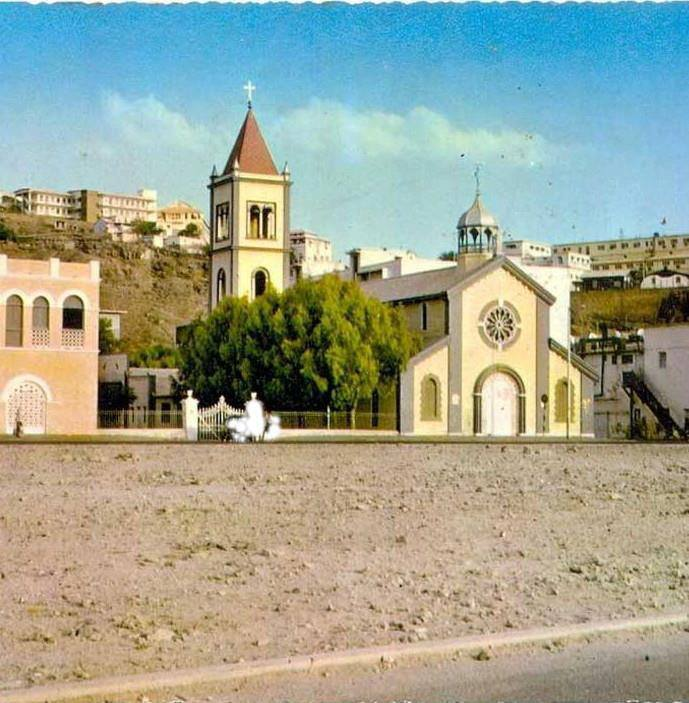
Church of St. Francis of Assisi on the harbour front of Aden in the 1960s

The Catholic Church in Yemen is part of the worldwide Catholic Church, under the spiritual leadership of the Pope in Rome.

Christians as a group make up 1.6% of Yemen’s population. Most of these are Orthodox Christians.

In 2020, there were around 40,000 Catholics in the country, which included one priest and eight nuns. There are also approximately 2,500 Catholics who are temporary foreign workers or refugees.

The Catholic Church in Yemen forms part of the Vicariate Apostolic of Southern Arabia.

== Persecution ==
Three nuns who were members of the Missionaries of Charity were killed in Hodeida 1998. In the same year, Yemen and the Vatican established diplomatic relations. On 4 March 2016, the Missionaries of Charity attack in Aden occurred, where terrorists of uncertain affiliation attacked a Catholic home for the elderly in Aden, killing sixteen people including four missionary sisters of the Missionaries of Charity and some local Muslim workers.

It is reported that at Christians and other religious minorities are often discriminated against when attempting to access humanitarian aid.

== Churches ==
There are four Catholic parishes in Yemen:

- Sacred Heart of Jesus Church, Hodeidah
- St. Francis of Assisi Church, Aden
- St. Mary Help of Christians Church, Sana'a
- St. Theresa of the Child Jesus Church, Taiz

== See also ==
- Religion in Yemen
- Christianity in Yemen
- Protestantism in Yemen
