= St. Mary Help of Christians Church, Sanaa =

Catholic Church in Sanaa, Yemen

St. Mary Help of Christians Church
- St. Mary Help of Christians Church
- Location: Sanaa
- Country: Yemen
- Denomination: Roman Catholic Church

Clergy
- Bishop(s): Paolo Martinelli, OFM Cap.

The St. Mary Help of Christians Church or simply Sanaa Catholic church is a religious building that is located in the city of Sanaa, the capital of the Asian country of Yemen.

The church follows the Roman Catholic or Latin rite and depends on the Apostolic Vicariate of Southern Arabia formerly known as Apostolic Vicariate of Aden, but name change under Pope Benedict XVI in 2011 with the decree "Bonum animarum" of the congregation for the Evangelization of Peoples (Congregatio pro gentium evangelizatione).

This is one of the 4 Catholic parish churches in that nation, the others being dedicated to St. Francis of Assisi (Aden), Sacred Heart of Jesus (Hodeidah) and St. Therese of the Child Jesus (Taiz).

== See also ==
- Roman Catholicism in Yemen
- St. Mary Help of Christians
