= Protestantism in Yemen =

Protestants make up 0.05% of the population of Yemen in 2023, while Christians as a group make up 0.08% of the country's population.

It is unknown when Protestants first arrived in Yemen, but records show that the British Bible Society opened a bookshop there in 1886. The following year the Church of Scotland Mission to South Arabia sent a missionary (Ion Keith Falconer) to Sheikh Othman in Adan. A medical colleague later opened a hospital in his memory. The Church of Scotland Mission worked with Danish missionary Oluf Høyer in Aden in 1904.

In the early 21st century, peaceful relations between Christians and Muslims contribute to religious freedom. However, it is reported that Christians and other religious minorities are often discriminated against when attempting to access humanitarian aid.

An American Baptist congregation is affiliated with a hospital in Jibla. Christ Church Aden, part of the Episcopal Church in Jerusalem and the Middle East, runs the charitable Ras Morbat Clinic in Aden.

== Denominations ==
- Baptist Church
- Episcopal Church in Jerusalem and the Middle East (Diocese of Cyprus and the Gulf)
- Church of South Arabia

== See also ==
- Religion in Yemen
- Christianity in Yemen
- Roman Catholicism in Yemen
