= Shia Islam in Yemen =

Shia Islam in Yemen is practiced by a substantial minority of the population, with the vast majority of Shia Muslims in Yemen being Zaydi, while a minority are Isma'ili. Sunni Muslims make between 55 to 65% percent of Yemen, while 35 to 45% of the country are Shia Muslims. These Shia Muslims are predominantly concentrated in the northwestern regions of the country, including the capital and major cities that are some of the most densely populated areas of Yemen.

Historically, the Zaydi Muslims ruled Yemen for a thousand years until 1962. During this time, they fiercely defended their independence, resisting foreign powers such as the Umayyads, Egypt, and the Ottomans, who aimed to control Lower Yemen and expand their rule northward. The Zaydi branch of Islam, known as the Fivers, is a sect almost exclusively prevalent in Yemen, making it a distinctive feature of the religion in Yemen.

== Population ==
Religion in Yemen primarily consists of two major Islamic branches. According to the CIA's World Factbook, approximately 65% of the population practices Sunni Islam, while around 35% adhere to Shia Islam. The vast majority of the Shia population are Zaydi, with minorities of Isma'ili Shias. Collectively, Yemeni Shias account for third of the country's 40 million people.

Zaydi Muslims are predominantly located in the north and northwest regions of Yemen, while Shafi'is, a Sunni school of thought, are prevalent in the south and southeast. In addition to the Islamic population, Yemen is home to a small number of Christians, estimated to number 3,000, as well as only 5 Jews.

== History ==
According to historical narrations, Islamic identities in Yemen have been categorized into two main Islamic orientations: Shia Zaydism and Sunni Shafi‘i. Also, a small population of Shia Ismailis are seen in the country. The population density of Zaydis historically is highest in the north of Yemen in Sa’dah, Amran, al-Jawf, Hajjah and Dhamar provinces. Shafiism is the dominant school of jurisprudence in lower Yemen, the eastern part of the country, and the Tihamah region. However, Zaydis and Shafei populations do not necessarily live in separated regions. For instance, the Sa’dah region is known for its high population of Zaydis, but in some areas, notably al-Hishwah, al-Zahir, Shida and Ghamr, Sunnis make up a considerable part of the population.

The Zaydis belong to a sect of Shia Islam established by followers of Zayd ibn Ali, the great-grandson of Ali, Shia Islam's first Imam. Zayd ibn Ali rebelled against the Umayyad government in 740 CE after the death of Husayn ibn Ali at Karbala, this being seen as justification for his status as the legitimate Imam in the eyes of the Zaydi sect. The first Zaydi Imam in Yemen, Yahya b. al-Husayn (d.911) made efforts to establish his rule over the tribes in the north of Yemen.

== Houthi movement ==
According to Charles Schmitz, a professor at Towson University, the Houthis' origins harken back to Al-Shabab al-Muminin (the Believing Youth), a group active in the early 1990s. The Believing Youth concentrated on raising awareness about the Zaydi branch of Shia Islam, which had ruled Yemen for centuries. However after the North Yemen Civil War in the 1960s, they were suppressed by the Yemeni government. Out of them became Yemen's Shia minority, containing 25% of the country's Muslims.

The Houthi movement, which belongs to Yemen's Zaydi Muslim community and that fought a series of rebellions against Ali Abdullah Saleh during the last decade, took control of its northern heartland around Saada province and its nearby areas.

== See also ==
- Islam in Yemen
- Freedom of religion in Yemen
- Islamic history of Yemen
- Religion in Yemen
