= Proto-Cathedral St. Francis of Assisi, Aden =

Catholic Church in Aden, Yemen

St. Francis of Assisi Church
- كنيسة القديس فرنسيس الأسيزي
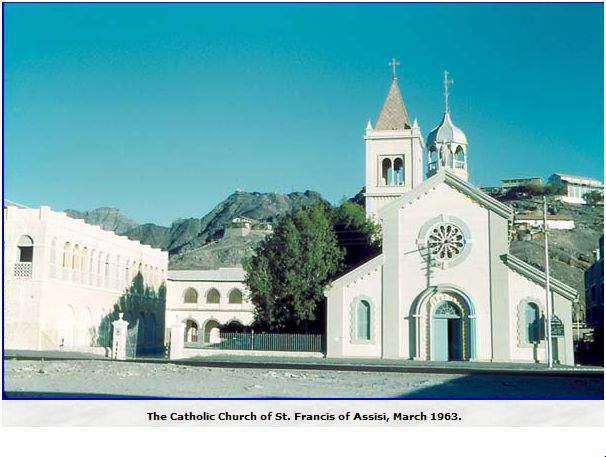
- St. Francis of Assisi Church
- Location: Aden
- Country: Yemen
- Denomination: Roman Catholic Church

Clergy
- Bishop(s): Paolo Martinelli, OFM Cap.

The St. Francis of Assisi Church (Arabic: كنيسة القديس فرنسيس الأسيزي) or the Proto-Cathedral of St. Francis of Assisi, or simply Church of St. Francis, is a religious building that is affiliated with the Catholic Church and is located in the city of Aden, in the Asian country of Yemen.

The term "proto-cathedral" in its name is used to refer to a church which was previously the cathedral of the see of a bishop. In the case of this particular proto-cathedral, it served as the cathedral of what is currently known as the Apostolic Vicariate of Southern Arabia from 1892 until 1974, when the Vicariate's seat was transferred to St. Joseph's Cathedral in Abu Dhabi in the United Arab Emirates. Currently, the Church of St. Francis has the status of parish church.

Its structure remains but has deteriorated considerably.

The statue of Christ blessing the sea has been attacked several times but remains in place. When the British ruled the region, next to the church it worked a School only for boys (School of St. Anthony) but then the Yemeni government appropriated the school and built a wall between the temple and school.

== See also ==
- Catholic Church in Yemen
- St. Francis of Assisi Church (disambiguation)
