= Tom Uzhunnalil =

Indian Catholic priest (born 1960)

The Reverend Thomas Uzhunnalil SDB
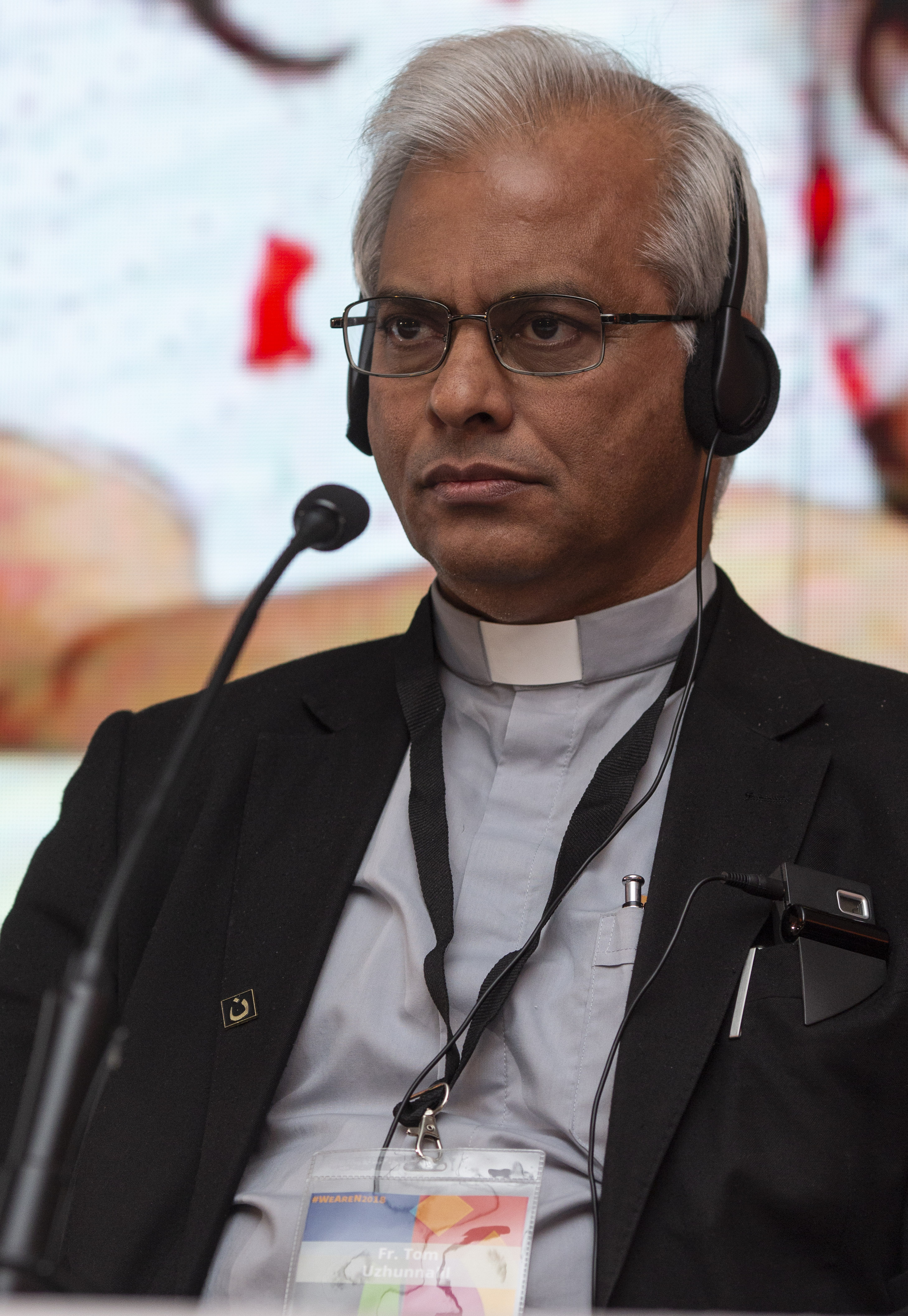

Personal life
- Born: August 18, 1958 (age 68) Ramapuram, India

Religious life
- Religion: Roman Catholic
- Institute: Salesian of Don Bosco

Senior posting
- Predecessor: Mathew Uzhunnalil

Tom Uzhunnalil, SDB is an Indian Catholic priest who is a member of the Salesians of Don Bosco. He was kidnapped in March 2016 and held by terrorists in Yemen before being released in September 2017 with the intervention of Oman and the Catholic Church.

== Life ==
Tom Uzhunnalil is a native of Kerala and a Salesian of Don Bosco. He has been working as a chaplain in Yemen since 2010, replacing his elder brother Mathew Uzhunnalil, who had served for more than 17 years. He had returned to India for a brief period in 2015 and went back despite a travel ban enforced in 2015 that prevented Indians from travelling to Yemen. Uzhunnalil has also been to Abu Dhabi on numerous occasions, one of them being the Apostolic Vicar of Southern Arabia Bishop Paul Hinder, based at St Joseph's Cathedral. He is a direct representative of Bishop Paul Hinder and the only priest working in Yemen on priesthood visa, as of 2016.

=== Kidnapping ===
Tom Uzhunnilal was present on March 4, 2016 when four unidentified gunmen attacked a care home in Yemen's southern port city of Aden, killing 16 people including four Missionaries of Charity sisters of Mother Teresa. The attackers, described as ISIS affiliates or general terrorists, took Uzhunnalil hostage. There were around 80 residents at the home at the time of the attack. Prior to the attack, Uzhunnalil had been working for more than four years as a chaplain at the home in southern Yemen. Though there were initial news reports that Uzhunnalil was crucified on Good Friday in 2016, the Indian government released an official statement declaring that Uzhunnalil was alive. A ransom video was sent by the kidnappers to the Indian government, demanding ₹64 crore.

In December 2016, Uzhunnalil made an emotional appeal for a rescue through a five-minute video that was posted on YouTube, asking the Indian government and the Pope to make effort for his release. Uzhunnalil was released into Omani custody on 12 September 2017. Uzhunnalil thanked Qaboos bin Said al Said, the Sultan of Oman, for his attention in negotiating his release. According to the Indian Union Minister, no ransom was paid for his release. He returned to India after his release and met with the Prime Minister Narendra Modi. Uzhunnalil was quoted as saying, "May God bless all, even my abductors, for all the goodness in them." He clarified that ISIS had given him food and didn't harm him physically.
