= History of the Jews in Saada =

In the early years before the immigration to Israel, the Jewish community of Saada numbered around 1000 people.

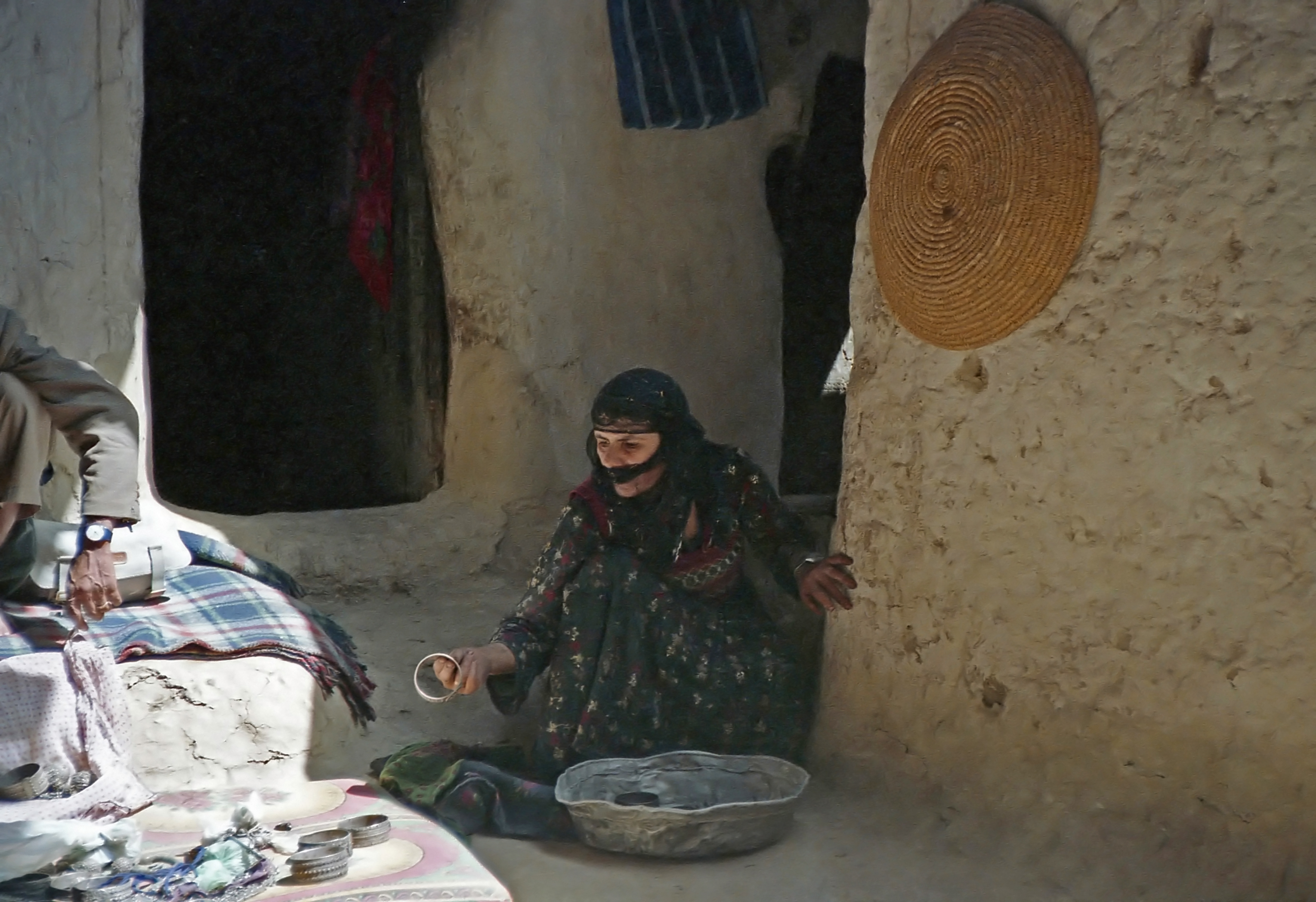
Yemenite Jewish woman in Saada 1986, Yemen

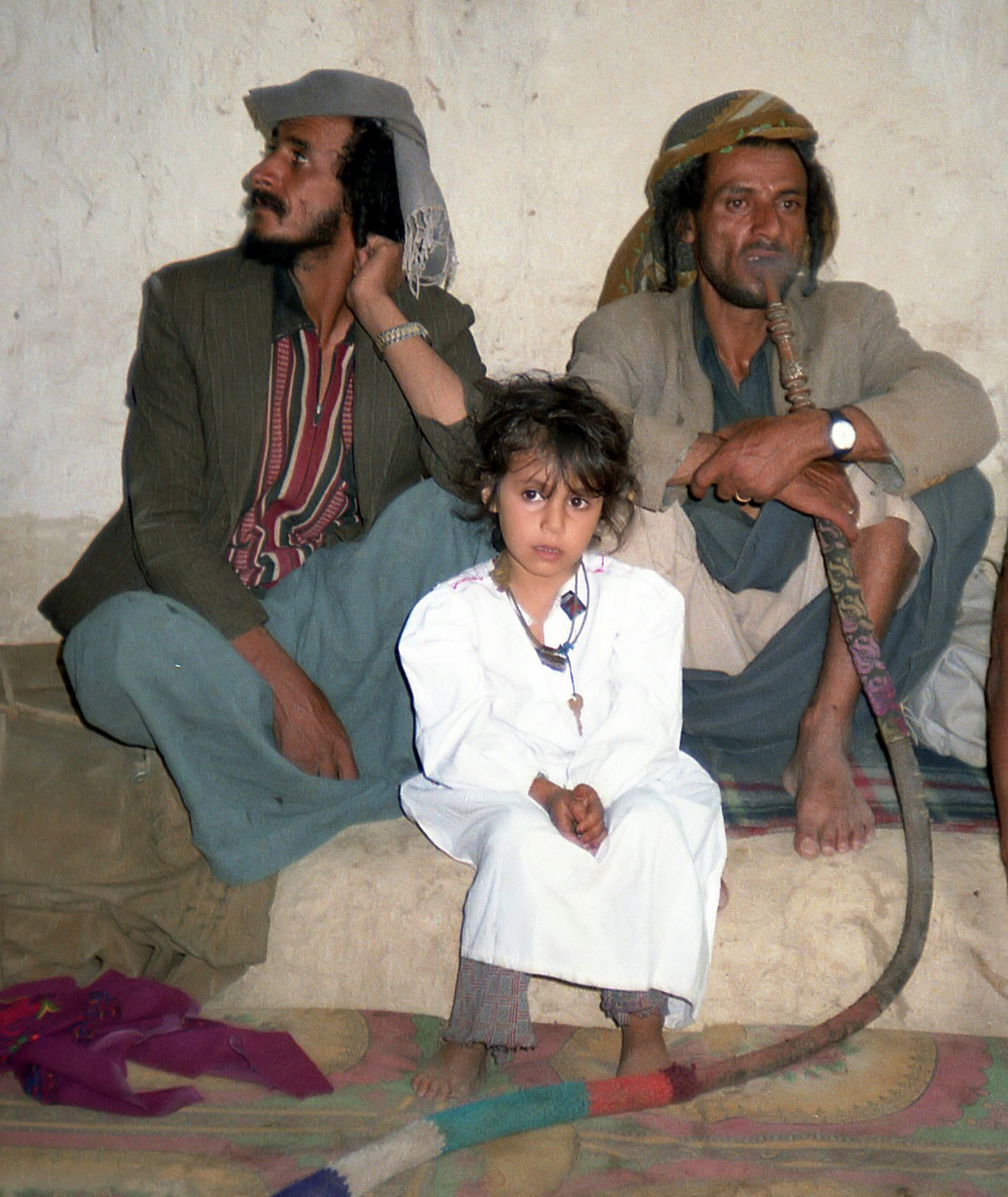
Yemenite Jews in Saada in 1986, Yemen

According to Rabbi Yahya Yousef Salem, who was the rabbi of a Jewish community that had lived in the northern province of Saada, The community is ancient. In his words, “Jewish settlement in Saada could be as old as the Torah”.

According to a report made in 1999 by the US state department, Approximately 500 Jews were scattered in a handful of villages between Sana'a and Saada in northern Yemen.

David Carasso, a Jewish merchant from Thessaloniki, spent his years 1874–9 in Yemen, and described the Saada Jews as “warrior Jews”. He also mentioned the good relationship between the Arabs of the area and the Saada community Jews.

The Jews from that area were to be found strong and tall, they were belong to a bellicose race, and were always armed in the Arab way with a curved Jambiya and a rifle.

In 1908, a group left the remote areas of Saada and made their way to Palestine through the coast of Ashir, with a boat from there.

A homemade alcohol was made by the Jews in the area and was consumed with khat as a social aspect of life, consumed in a small group, and described in a testimony from the early 1900s as a "delightful time".

In 1992, Jews from Saada were forbidden from placing burial stones on their graves. Another prohibition from the same year stated that a cooking utensils could not be shared with Jews, if it had been used by Muslims.

Sanaa's Jewish community lived in a guarded district under the protection of the central government, after fleeing to the capital from the town of Saada following Houthis threats in 2007.

“We warn you to leave the area immediately... Ignore this message, and we give you a period of 10 days, and you will regret it,” a Houthi representative warned the Jewish community of Saada at the time.

They sought refuge in the night with Sheikh Bakhtan – Jews had traditionally been protected by tribal sheikhs. It was Sheikh Bakhtan who drove the rabbi's family to the capital, where the community of 70 remains under the president's protection.

According to a report made by The U.S Department Of State in 2008, Jews in Yemen are the only indigenous non-Muslim religious minority. Nearly all of the once-sizable Jewish population has emigrated. Fewer than 400 Jews remain in the northern part of the country, primarily in Amran Governorate. Since January 2007 the historic Saada Governorate community of 45 Jews has lived in Sana'a, under the protection and care of the Government, after abandoning their homes in the face of threats from al-Houthi rebels. The community has abandoned its synagogues in Saada. There is at least one functioning synagogue in Amran Governorate.

In the year 2015, only 70 Jews from Saada remained. All were driven from their homes in the northern province at gunpoint by Zaidi Houthi rebels and told never to return.

As of 2016, it was estimated that around 40 Jews were left in Yemen.
