= Islam in Yemen =

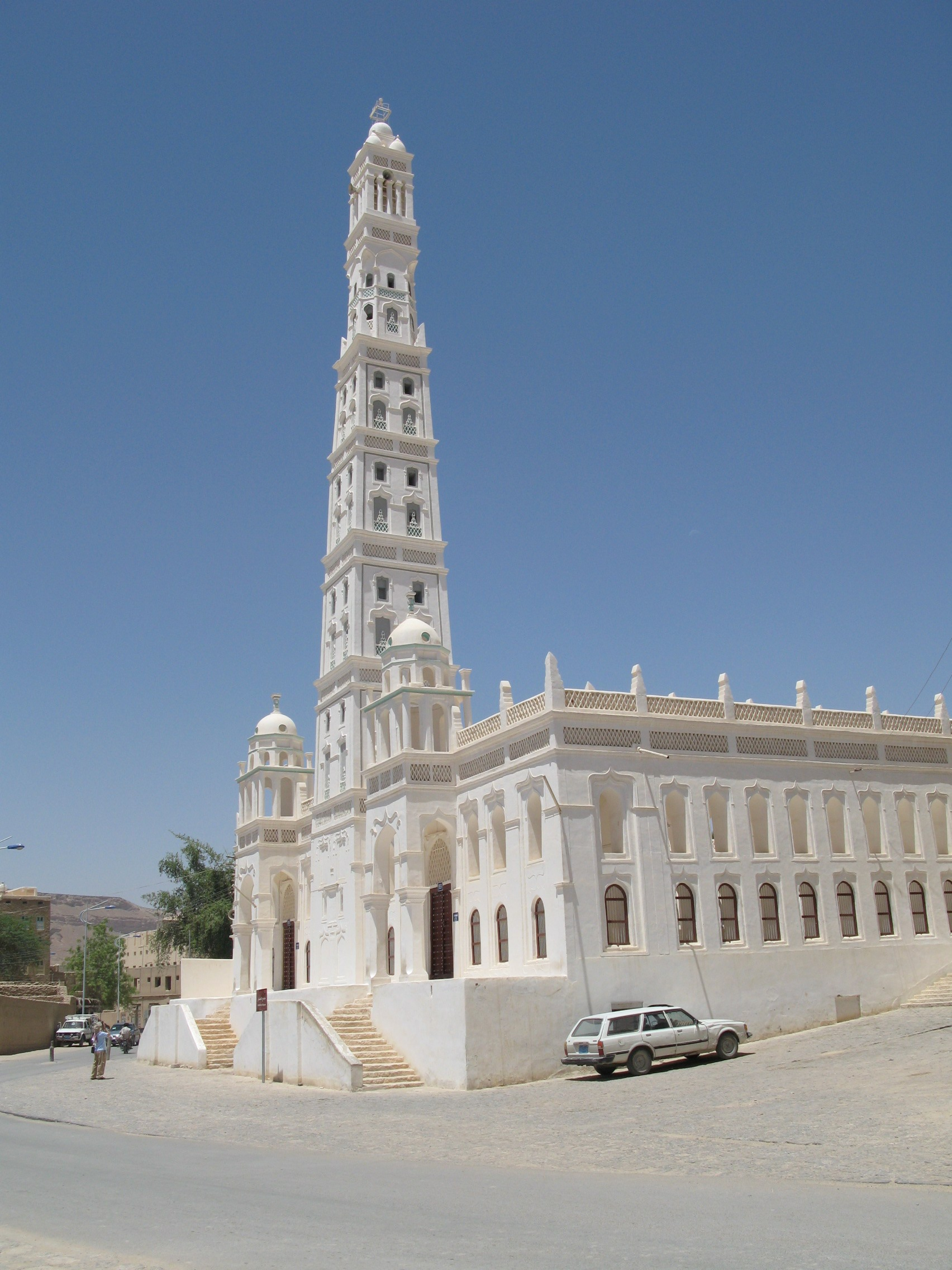
Al-Muhdhar Mosque

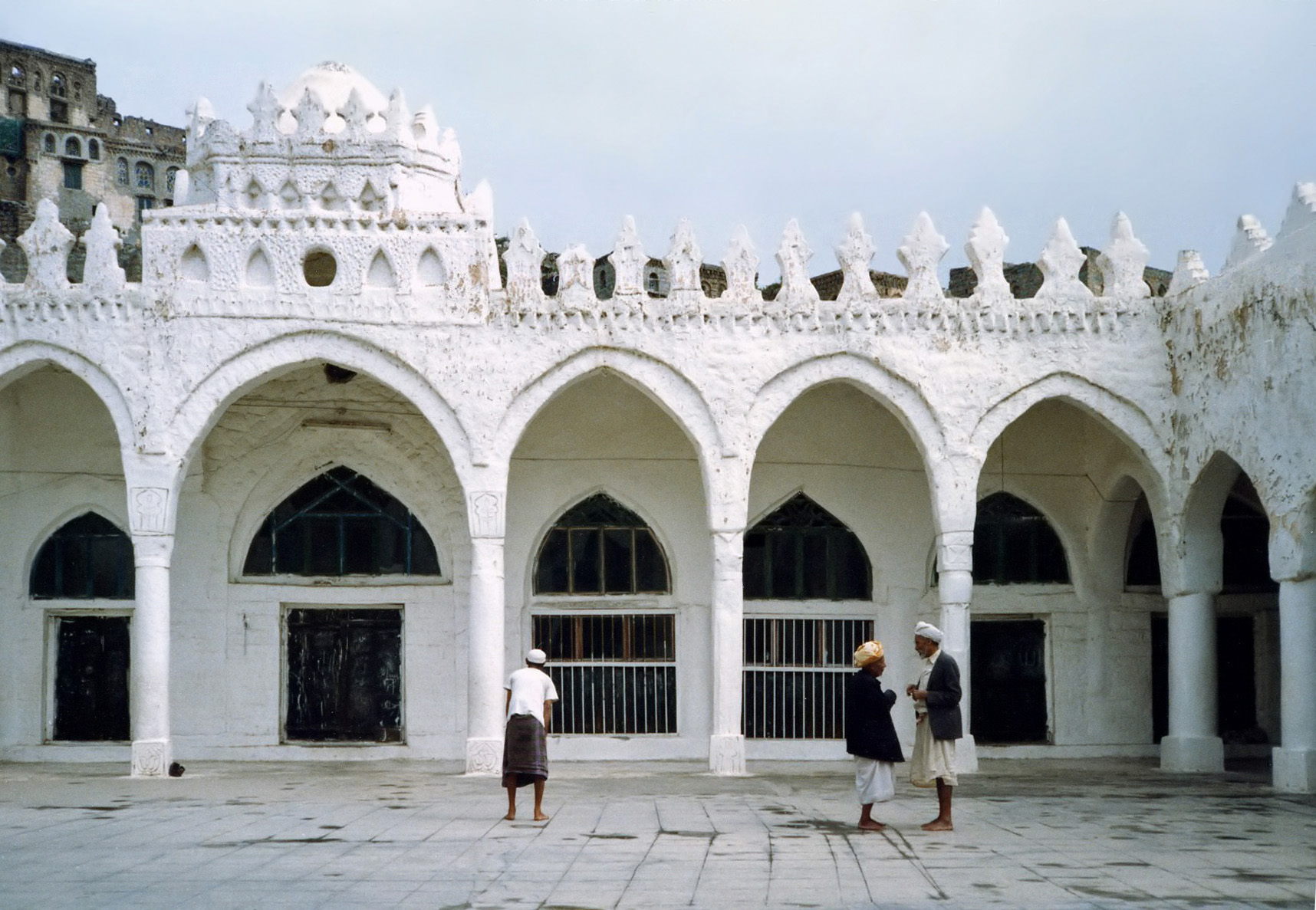
Queen Arwa Mosque in Jibla

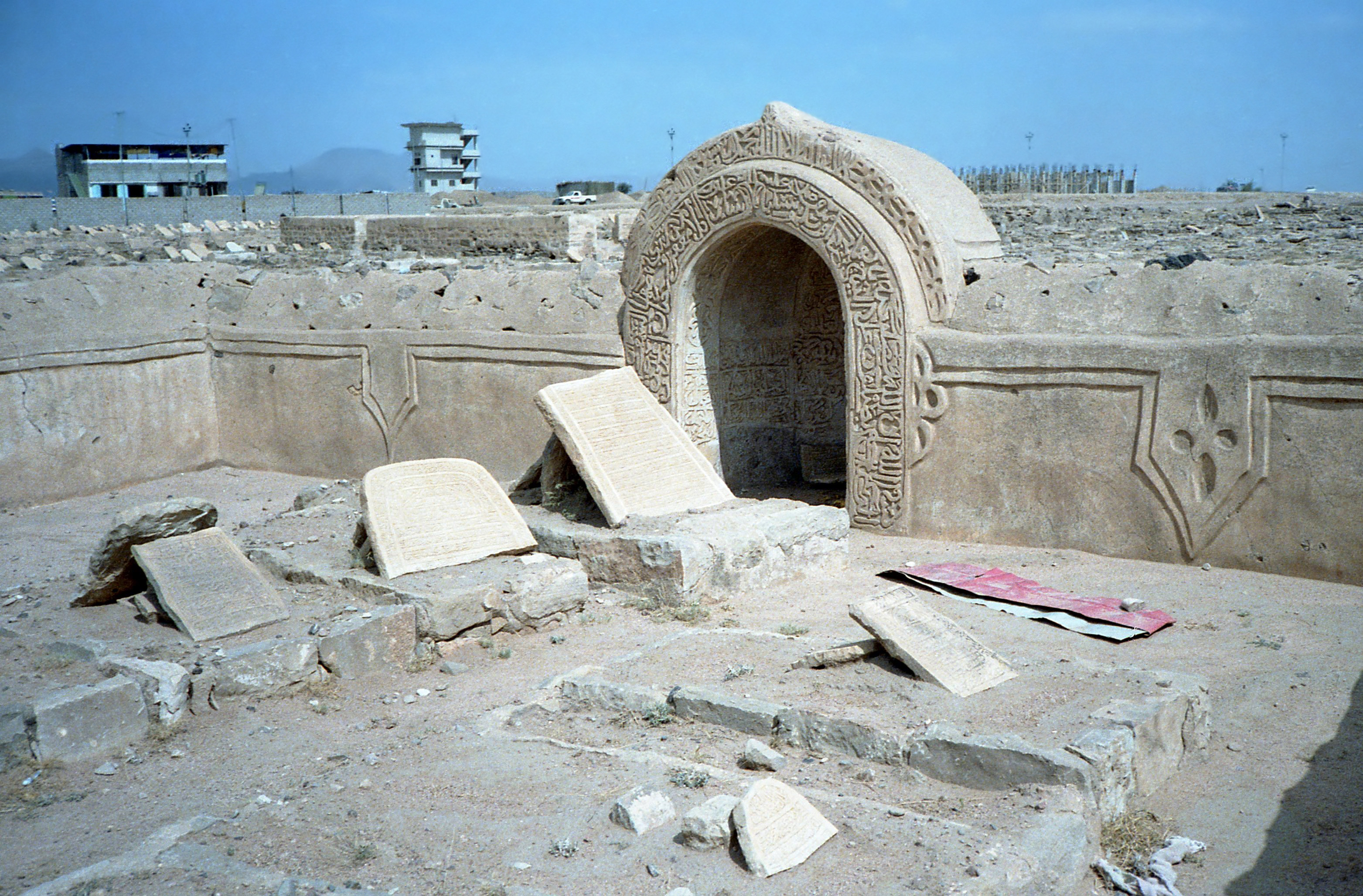
Cemetery in Sa'dah

Islam is the largest religion in Yemen, followed by over 99% of the total population. Approximately 55–60% of Yemeni Muslims adhere to Sunni Islam while 35–40% adhere to Shia Islam, mainly the Zaydi branch. A minority of Shias follow the Sulaymani Bohra community, a subdivision of Tayyibi Mustali Ismailism. The Sunnis are predominantly in the south and southeast. The Zaydis are predominantly in the north and northwest whilst the Jafaris are in the main centres of the North such as Sana'a and Ma'rib. There are mixed communities in the larger cities.

Islam was introduced around 630 CE in Yemen when Ali ibn Abi Talib finalized the conquest of it when Muhammad was still alive. It was during this period that the mosques in Janad (near Ta'izz) and the Great Mosque of Sana'a were built.

According to WIN/Gallup International polls, Yemen has the most religious population among Arab countries and it has one of the most religious populations world-wide.

== Population ==
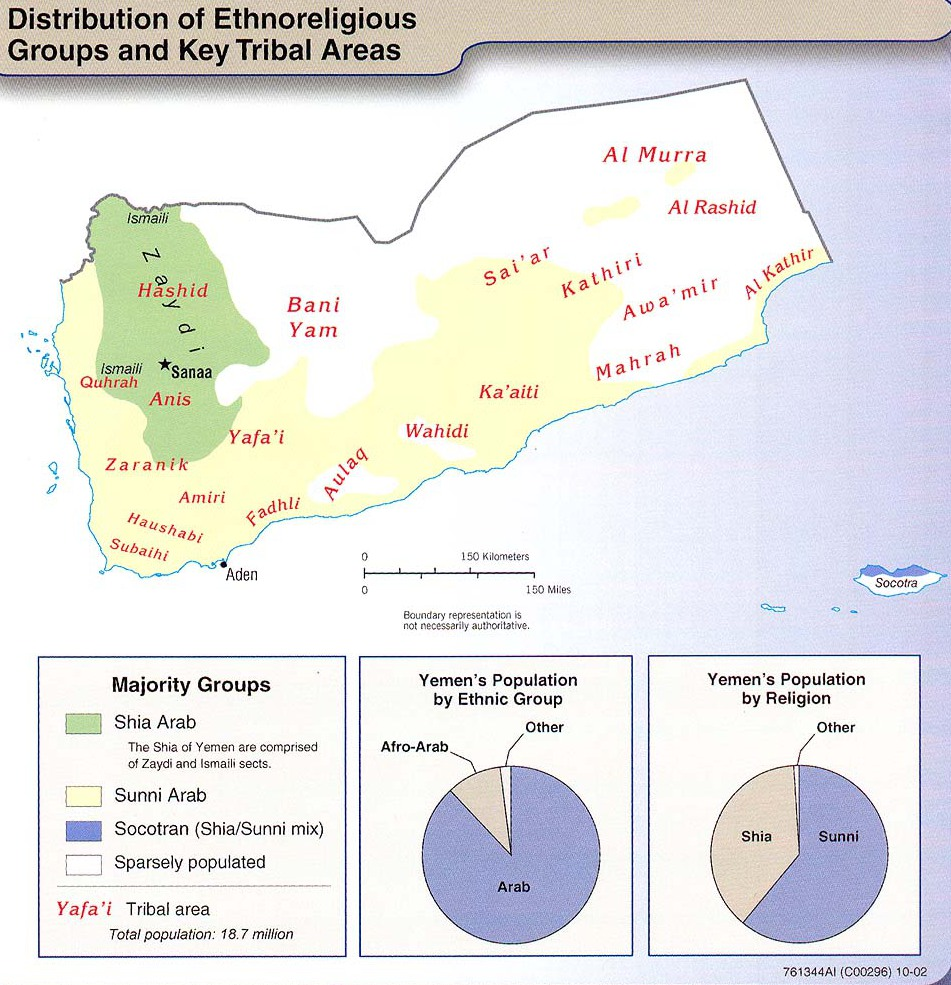
Yemen's tribal areas and Shia/Sunni regions. Shia Muslims are predominant in the green area of Yemen's west, with the rest of Yemen being Sunni Muslims

The Zaydis of the northern highlands dominated politics and cultural life in northern Yemen for centuries; with the Unification of Yemen, and the addition of the south’s almost totally Sunni Muslim population, the numerical balance has shifted dramatically away from the Zaydis. Nevertheless, Zaydis are still over represented in the government and, in particular, in the former North Yemeni units within the armed forces.

The Zaydi imamate, a system of religious and political rule dating to the late 9th century, governed much of northern Yemen for nearly a thousand years until it was abolished following the 1962 North Yemen Civil War, when a republican movement deposed Imam Muhammad al-Badr and established the Yemen Arab Republic. While the imamate itself ended, Zaydism has remained associated with political identity in the northern highlands, and the movement's legacy has continued to shape regional politics; the modern Houthi movement, whose leadership and much of its base are Zaydi, has drawn on the historical memory of the imamate in articulating its own political objectives.

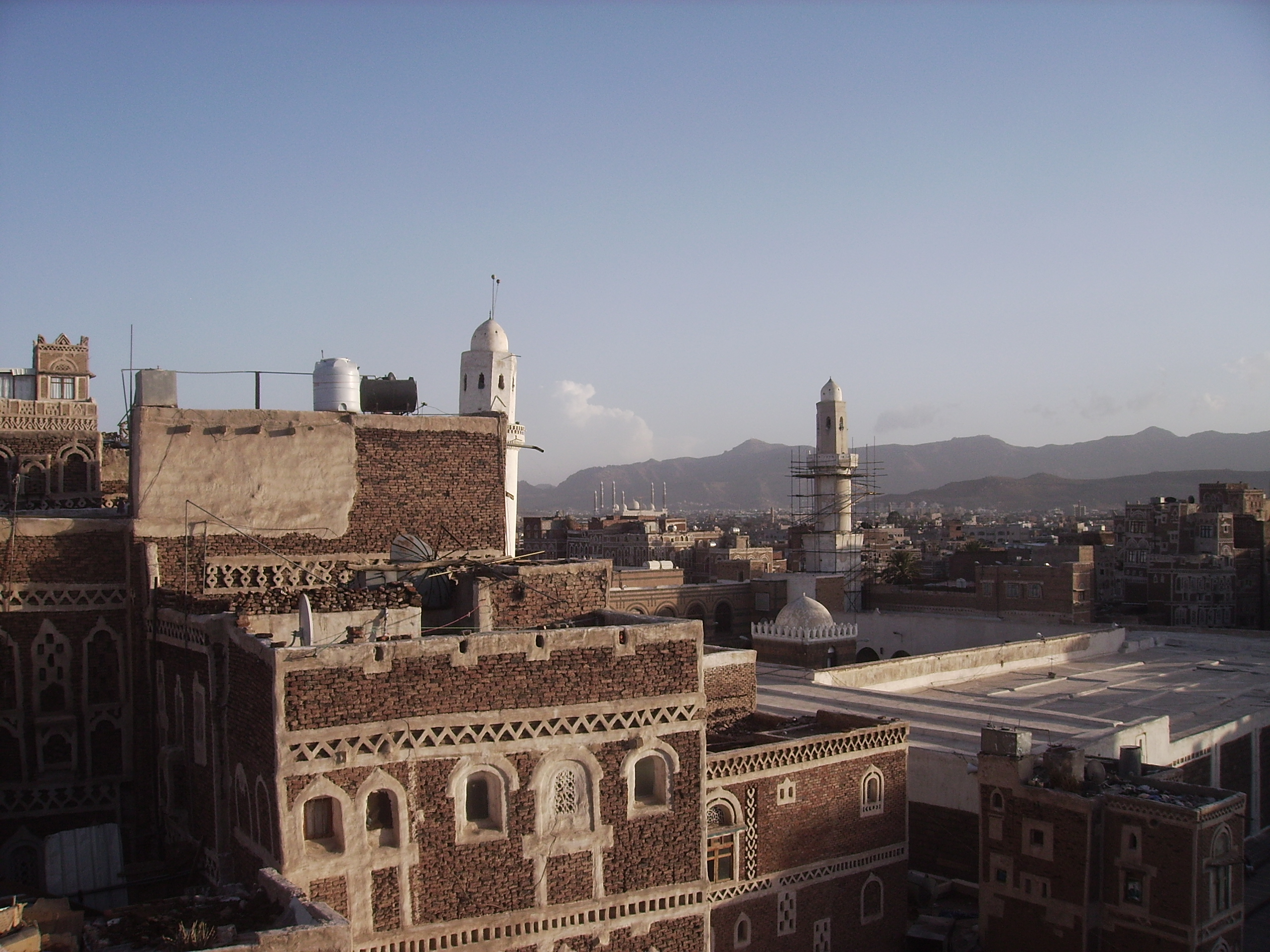
Great Mosque of Sanaa

Houthi authorities in Sana’a formally enacted new regulations on the collection and use of zakat, the Islamic obligation for individuals to donate a portion of their wealth each year to charitable causes. The executive bylaw, signed by Mehdi al-Mashat, president of the Houthi-run Supreme Political Council (SPC), imposes a khums tax (literally meaning “one-fifth”, or 20 percent) on economic activities involving natural resources in areas under the group’s control in Yemen, which includes most of northern Yemen where some 70 percent of the population lives.

== Society ==
Public schools provide instruction in Islam but not in other religions, although Muslim citizens are allowed to attend private schools that do not teach Islam. In an effort to curb ideological and religious extremism in schools, the government does not permit any courses outside the officially approved curriculum to be taught in private and national schools. Because the government is concerned that unlicensed religious schools deviate from formal educational rirements and promote militant ideology, it has closed more than 4,500 of these institutions and deported foreign students studying there.

== See also ==
- Freedom of religion in Yemen
- Islam by country
- Islamic history of Yemen
- Religion in Yemen
- Shia Islam in Yemen
