= Freedom of religion in Yemen =

The Constitution of Yemen provides for freedom of religion, and the government generally respected this right in practice; however, there were some restrictions. The Constitution declares that Islam is the state religion, and that Shari'a (Islamic law) is the source of all legislation. Government policy continued to contribute to the generally free practice of religion; however, there were some restrictions. Muslims and followers of religious groups other than Islam are free to worship according to their beliefs, but the Government prohibits conversion from Islam and the proselytization of Muslims. Although relations among religious groups continued to contribute to religious freedom, there were some reports of societal abuses and discrimination based on religious belief or practice. There were isolated attacks on Jews and some prominent Zaydi Muslims felt targeted by government entities for their religious affiliation. Government military reengagement in the Saada governorate caused political, tribal, and religious tensions to reemerge in January 2007, following the third military clash with rebels associated with the al-Houthi family, who adhere to the Zaydi school of Shi'a Islam.

== Religious demography ==
As of 2008, virtually all citizens were Muslims, either belonging to the Zaydi order of Shi'a Islam (~45-50%) or to the Shafa'i order of Sunni Islam (50-55%). Due to unrest and a mass movement of citizens, there are no definite figures for the 2020s; however most sources agree that the country is about 99% Muslim, with at least a third of these following Zaydism.

Jews are the only non-Muslim religious minority in the country. While the Jewish community was once sizable, most have since emigrated. As of 2020, fewer than 400 remain, mainly in the northern region, particularly in Amran Governorate.

The largest religious minority is Hinduism.

In 2023, Christians as a group make up 0.06% of the country’s population. Many of these are temporary foreign workers or refugees.

== Status of religious freedom ==
=== Legal and policy framework ===
The Constitution provides for freedom of religion, and the Government generally respected this right in practice; however, there were some restrictions. The Constitution declares that Islam is the state religion and that Shari'a is the source of all legislation. Followers of religious groups other than Islam are free to worship according to their beliefs and to wear religiously distinctive ornaments or dress; however, Shari'a forbids conversion and prohibits non-Muslims from proselytizing, and the Government enforces this prohibition. The Government requires permission for the construction of new places of worship and prohibits non-Muslims from holding elected office.

The Government issues residence visas to priests so that they may provide for their community's religious needs. Christian clergy, who ministered to the foreign community, were employed in teaching, social services, and health care.

The country maintains regular diplomatic relations with the Vatican.

The Government does not maintain records of an individual's religious identity, and there is no law that requires religious groups to register with the state; however, the General Election Committee has adopted a policy barring all non-Muslims from running for Parliament. Chapter 2, Article 106 of the Constitution further notes that the President of the Republic must "practice his Islamic duties."

Public schools provide instruction in Islam but not in other religions; however, Muslim citizens can attend private schools that do not teach Islam. Almost all non-Muslim students in the country are foreigners and attend private schools.

The Muslim holy days of Eid al-Adha, Muharram, and Eid al-Fitr are public holidays.

Public schools provide instruction in Islam but not in other religions, although Muslim citizens are allowed to attend private schools that do not teach Islam. In an effort to curb ideological and religious extremism in schools, the government does not permit any courses outside of the officially approved curriculum to be taught in private and national schools. Because the government is concerned that unlicensed religious schools deviate from formal educational requirements and promote militant ideology, it has closed more than 4,500 of these institutions and deported foreign students studying there.

=== Restrictions on religious freedom ===
Government policy and practice contributed to the generally free practice of religion; however, there were some restrictions.

During the reporting period, the Government engaged in efforts to ease religious tension between it and some members of the Zaydi-Shi'a establishment; however, public tension reemerged in January 2007, most notably in the media, as a result of government action against the al-Houthi group's armed insurrection. The Government maintains that the al-Houthis adherents of Twelver Shi'ism, a variant of Shi'ism which differs from that of the country's predominant Zaydi-Shi'a. The al-Houthis and the Shabab follow the teachings of the late rebel cleric Hussein Badr Eddine al-Houthi, who was killed during a ten-week rebellion that he led in June 2004 against the Government in Saada. Some Zaydis reported harassment and discrimination by the Government because they were suspected of sympathizing with the al-Houthis. However, it appears the Government's actions against the group were probably politically, not religiously, motivated.

Government actions to counter an increase in political violence in Saada restricted some practice of religion. In January 2007, for the third year, the Government banned the celebration of the Shi'a holy day Eid al-Ghadeer in parts of the Saada governorate. During the reporting period, the Government also reportedly intensified its efforts to stop the growth of the al-Houthis' popularity by limiting the hours that mosques were permitted to be open to the public. The Government closed down what it claimed to be extremist Shi'a religious institutes, reassigning imams who were thought to espouse radical doctrine, and increasing surveillance of mosque sermons. The Government abolished the Zaydi-affiliated al-Haq political party in March 2007, reportedly for not meeting political party law requirements. Many members of the party, however, believed the party was inappropriately dissolved because of its links to the al-Houthis and Shabab movement.

The Government prohibits the proselytization of Muslims. During the period covered by this report, there were reports of persons being temporarily detained for possession of religious materials with the intent to proselytize.

Under Shari'a, as applied in the country, the conversion of a Muslim to another religion is considered apostasy, which the Government interprets as a crime punishable by death. During the period covered by this report, there were no reported cases in which persons were charged with apostasy or prosecuted for it by government authorities.

The Government did not allow the building of new public places of worship without previous authorization. Roman Catholic officials at the end of this reporting period, like last year, were still waiting for a decision from the Government on whether it would allow an officially recognized Roman Catholic establishment to be built in Sana'a. Church officials did not attribute government inaction to discrimination.

Weekly services for Roman Catholic, Protestant, and Ethiopian Orthodox Christians were held throughout Sana'a, Aden, and other cities without government interference. Throughout the country, Christian and Jewish services were held regularly in private homes or facilities, such as schools, without harassment, and such facilities appeared adequate to accommodate the small numbers involved.

The ruling General People's Congress (GPC) and the Islah opposition party both drew on Islam as a basis for law in their platforms. The ruling GPC did not exclude members of any religion from its membership. Islah required that a member must be "committed" to Islamic teachings. There were other minor political parties that were said to be Islamic in nature, although it was not clear if they restricted their membership to Muslims.

During the reporting period, the Government continued its efforts to prevent the politicization of mosques and schools, and to curb extremism, and increase tolerance. The Government's efforts concentrated on monitoring mosques for sermons that incite violence or other political statements that it considered harmful to public security. Private Islamic organizations could maintain ties to international Islamic organizations; however, the Government sporadically monitored their activities through the police and intelligence authorities.

During the reporting period, the Government also continued efforts to close unlicensed schools and religious centers. By the end of the period covered by this report, more than 4,500 unlicensed religious schools and institutions were closed. The Government expressed concern that these schools deviated from formal educational requirements and promoted militant ideology. The Government also deported some foreign students found studying in unlicensed religious schools. The Government prohibited private and national schools from teaching courses outside of the officially approved curriculum. The purpose of these actions was to curb ideological and religious extremism in schools.

There were reports that both the Ministry of Culture and the Political Security Office (PSO) monitored and sometimes removed books that espoused Zaydi-Shi'a Islamic doctrine from store shelves after publication. There were also credible reports from Zaydi scholars and politicians that authorities banned the publishing of some materials that promoted Zaydi-Shi'a Islam. The Government denied that the media was subject to censorship by any security apparatus.

Government policy does not prohibit or provide punishment for the possession of non-Islamic religious literature; however, on occasion there were credible reports that persons were harassed by members of the PSO, an organization which reports directly to the president's office, and by police for possessing such literature. There were also reports that some members of the PSO monitored, harassed, and occasionally censored the mail of missionary groups and those associated with them, ostensibly to prevent proselytizing.

Following the unification of North and South Yemen in 1990, owners of property expropriated by the communist government of the former People's Democratic Republic of Yemen were invited to seek restitution of their property; however, implementation has been extremely limited, and very few properties have been returned to previous owners. In exchange for its confiscated property, the Catholic Church requested from the Government a small plot of land in Sana'a on which to build a Catholic establishment. The Church was awaiting action on the request at the end of the period covered by this report.

The Constitution declares that Islamic Shari'a is the source of all legislation. Some local customs, believed to be part of Shari'a as practiced in the country, are codified in various laws and policies. Some of these laws discriminate against women and persons of other religious groups.

According to the Government's interpretation of Shari'a, Muslim women are not permitted to marry outside of Islam. Under 1992 Personal Status Law No. 20, men are permitted to marry as many as four wives, although very few do so. The law also forbids men from marrying non-Muslims (except for Jews and Christians) or apostates (those who have renounced Islam).

=== Abuses of religious freedom ===
During the reporting period, security officials arbitrarily arrested and detained some individuals suspected of proselytizing and looking for H.A.Lutf Alshabi for the same reason. There was also a credible newspaper report that claimed security officials harassed and detained a Muslim carrying missionary publications in Taiz. Unconfirmed reports attributed such incidents to followers of conservative Salafi Islamic doctrine within the security apparatus.

Since 2001 the Government has detained several hundred Islamists who returned to Yemen from Afghanistan and/or Iraq "for questioning." Although most persons were released within days, some reportedly continued to be detained beyond the maximum detention period as terrorist or security suspects.

In May 2006 President Ali Abdullah Saleh pardoned two imams, Yahia Hussein al-Dailami, who was sentenced to death, and Muhammed Ahmad Miftah, who was sentenced to 8 years imprisonment. The two were originally convicted of establishing contacts with Iran for the purpose of harming the country. The two men publicly opposed the Government's action in Saada and formed the Sana'a Youth Organization, a Zaydi religious-based group that supported the al-Houthis. Both men maintained that they only advocated peaceful dissent against government action in Saada.

During the same month, the Government released more than 200 al-Houthi rebel detainees in an amnesty. It was unclear how many of those detained participated in the renewed March 2005 rebellion against the Government. Although some of those detained were held for their support of the al-Houthis' religious teachings, the arrests appeared to have been more politically than religiously motivated.

=== Forced religious conversion ===
There were no reports of forced religious conversion, including of minor U.S. citizens who had been abducted or illegally removed from the United States, or of the refusal to allow such children to be returned to the United States.

=== Improvements and Positive Developments in Respect for Religious Freedom ===
As part of its campaign against religious extremism, the Government also took action to improve conditions that affected societal attitudes on religious freedom. In May 2006 the Ministry of Endowment and Religious Guidance conducted a six-day training course for 500 imams to promote principles of moderation and religious tolerance. The Government continued to support this campaign and planned for similar programs in the future, under the Ministry of Endowment and Religious Guidance.

== Societal abuses and discrimination ==
There were some reports of societal abuses and discrimination based on religious belief or practice, but a general sense of religious freedom persisted. Religious minorities generally lived in harmony with their Muslim neighbors.

Isolated attacks in recent years by anti-Jewish extremists have convinced most of the country's Jews to relocate to the town of Raida for safety and to sustain their community. The Saada Jewish community was displaced by fighting to Sana'a.

There were no reported incidents of violence or discrimination between the adherents of Zaydi and Shafa'i Islam, the two main orders of Islam practiced in the country.

In 2023, Yemen is ranked as ‘High’ on the scale of state discrimination against minority religions and it is reported that religious minorities are often discriminated against when attempting to access humanitarian aid.

During the reporting period, there were sporadic reports of violence initiated by Salafi elements attempting to take control of moderate and Sufi mosques around the country. There were also unconfirmed reports that followers of Ismaili Islamic teachings were occasionally harassed and forbidden entry to mosques affiliated with Salafi followers.

== See also ==
- Religion in Yemen
- Human rights in Yemen
- Shia Islam in Yemen
