= Religion in Yemen =

Religion in Yemen (2022 estimate)
1. Sunni Islam (65%)
2. Zaydi Shi'a Islam (34%)
3. Other (Ismaili Shi'a Islam, Twelver Shi'a Islam, Christianity, Hinduism, and Sikhism) (1%)

Yemen is an Islamic country. Nearly all Yemenis are Muslims: the U.S. government estimated in 2024 that more than 99% of the population is Muslim, with approximately 60–65% adhering to Sunni Islam and 35–40% to Shia Islam (mostly Zaydism). Amongst the native population, there were an estimated 1,000 Christians and six Jews remaining in 2016. The U.S. State Department's International Religious Freedom Report for 2023 put the estimated number of Christians in Yemen at 16,500 but also acknowledged other estimates of a few thousand. The same report noted there was only one Jew left in Yemen following the expulsion of 13 by Houthis in 2021. However, using data collected in 2010, the Pew Research Center estimated there were over 40,000 Christians, though most do not publicly identify as such due to fears of religious persecution. There are estimated to be a few thousand Bahá’ís in Yemen, including many from Yemeni tribes and prominent families, alongside long-time residents of Persian origin.

According to 2017 WIN/Gallup International polls, Yemen has the most religious population among Arab countries, and it is one of the most religious populations worldwide.

== Islam ==
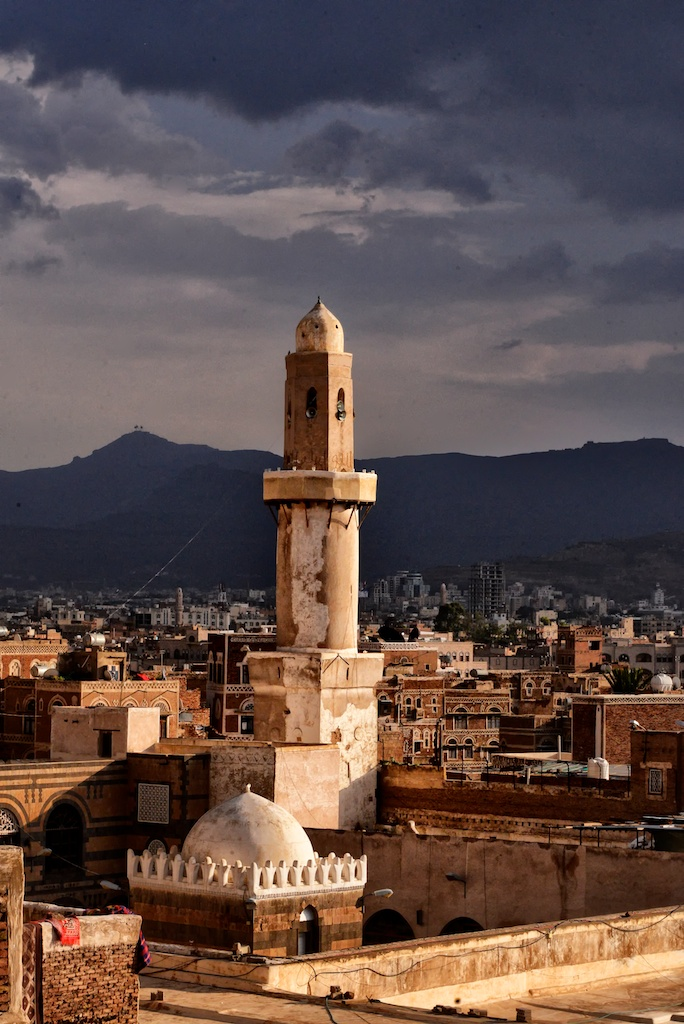
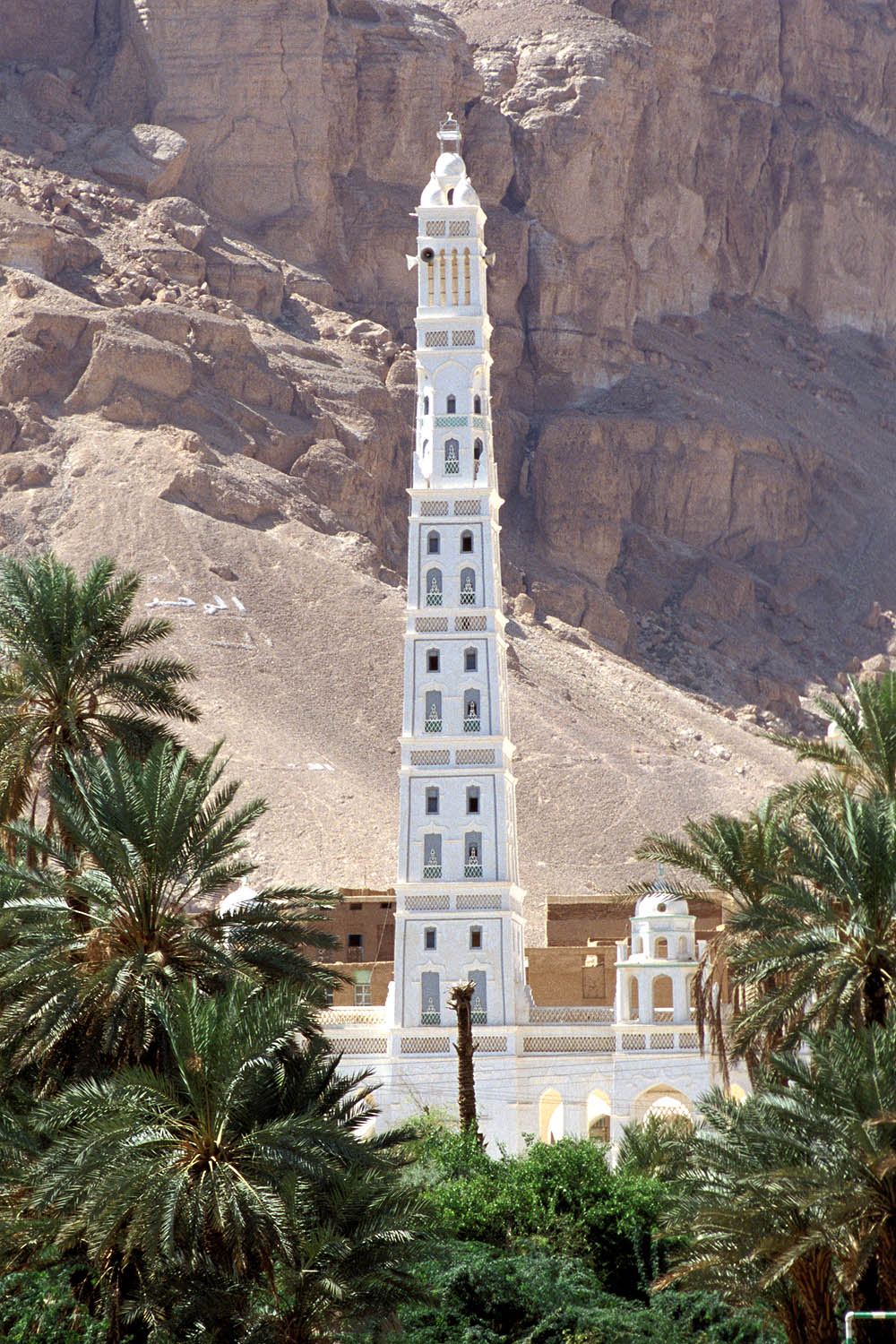
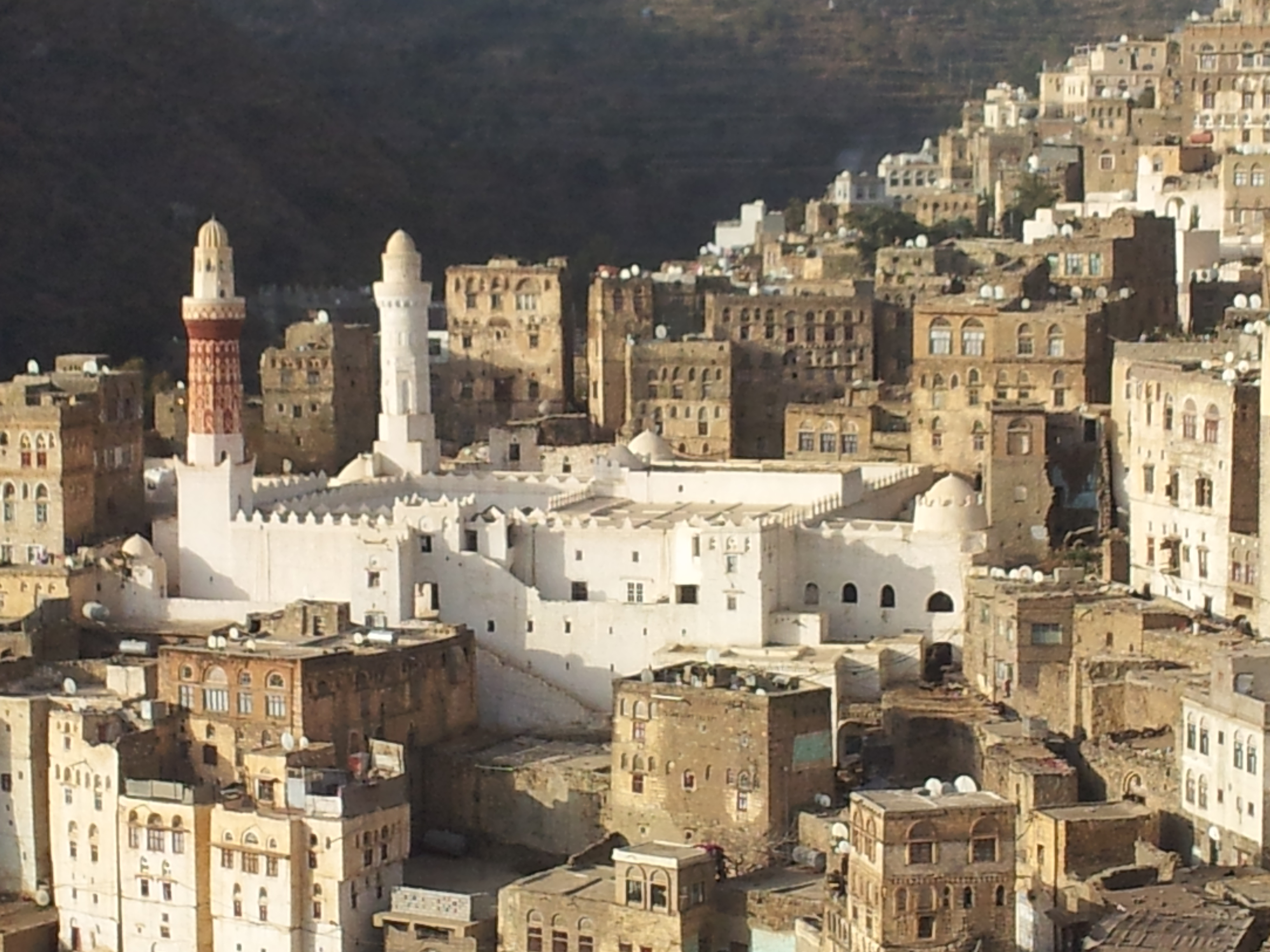
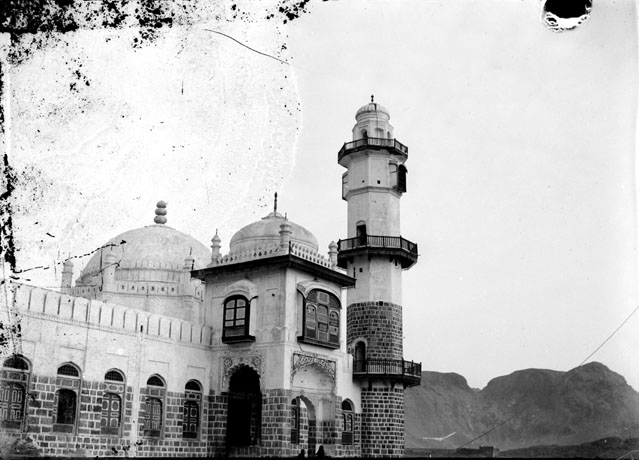
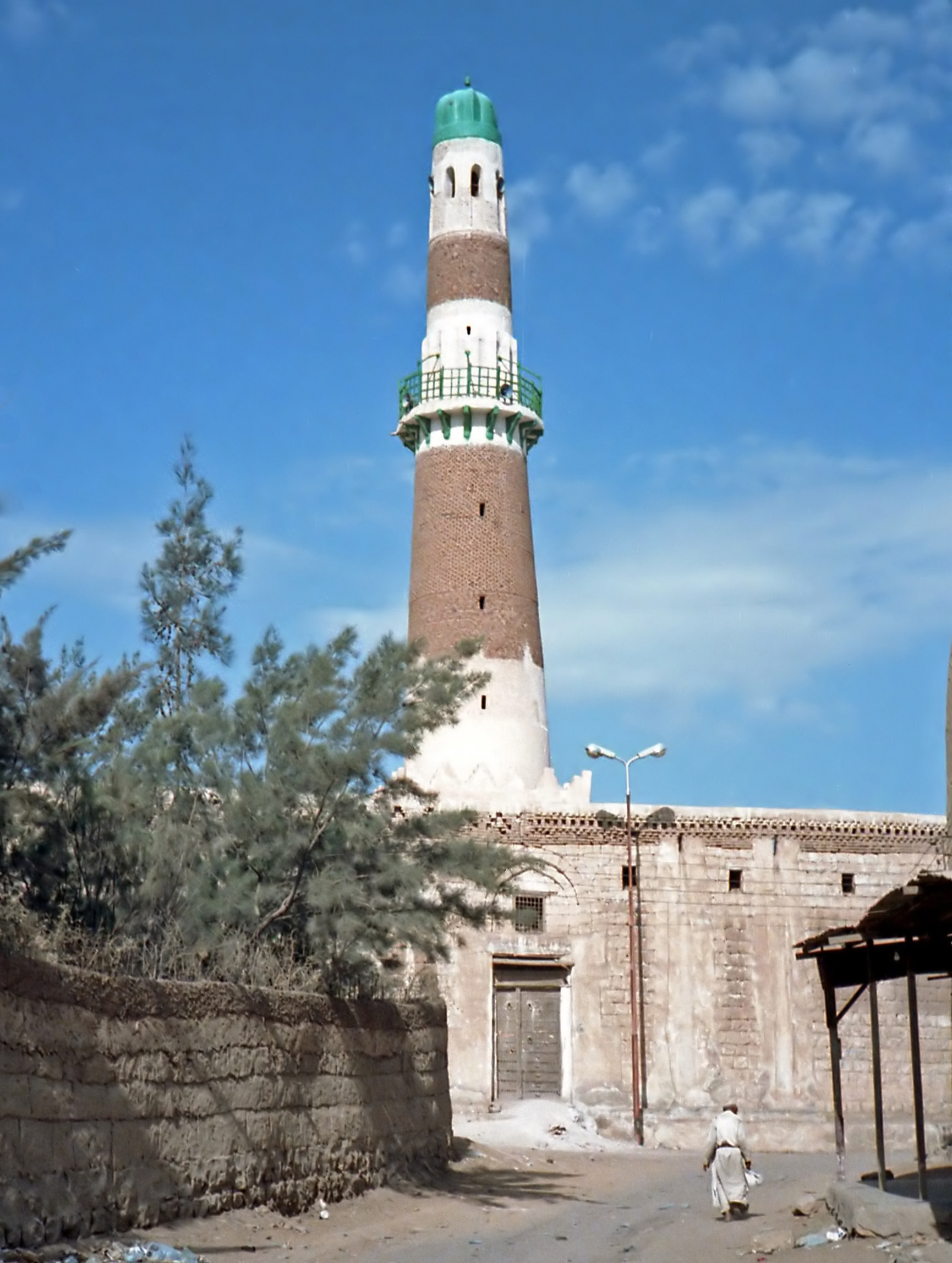
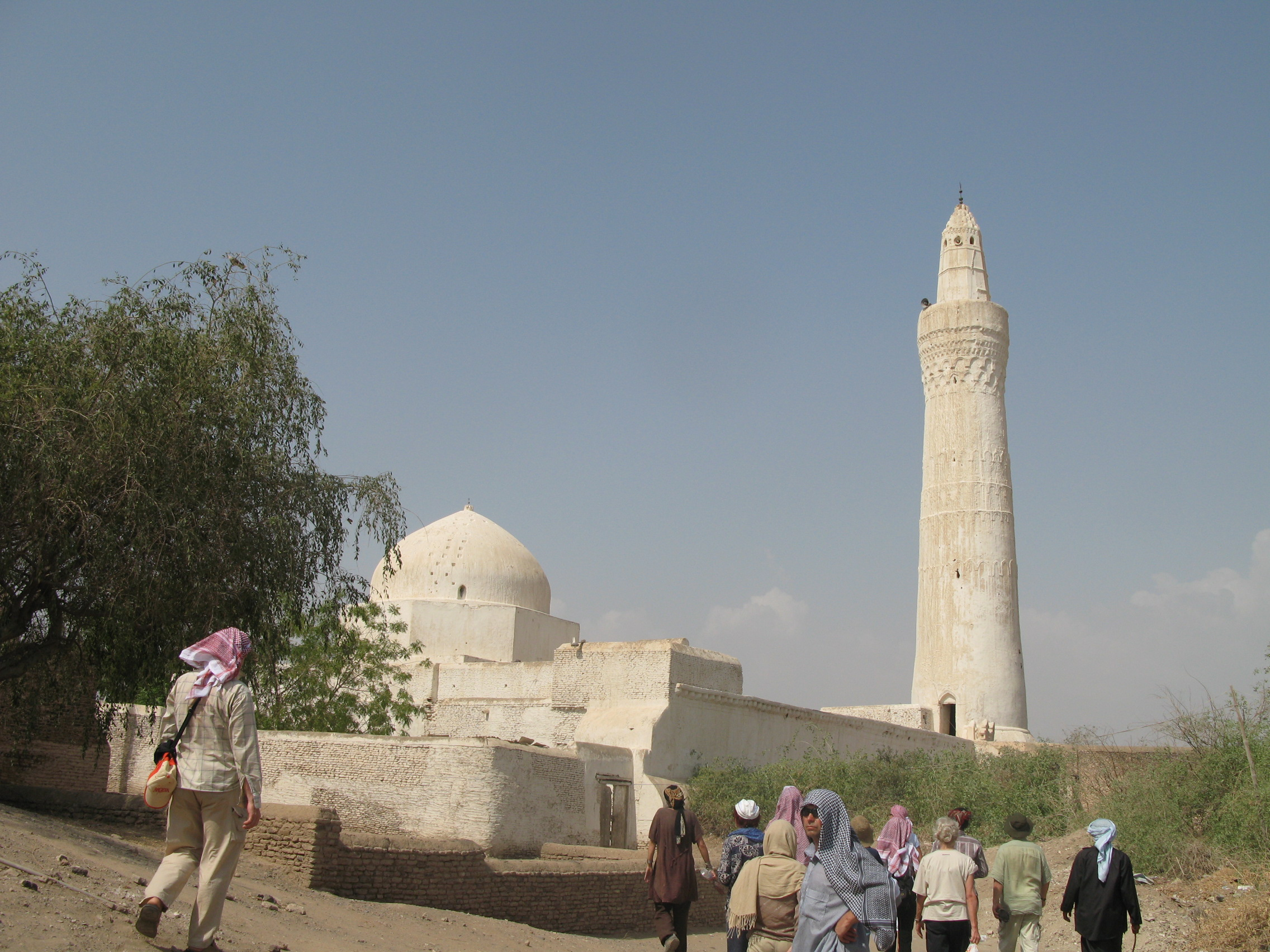
Clockwise from top: Great Mosque of Sana'a, Queen Arwa Mosque, Al-Hadi Mosque, Al-Asha'ir Mosque, Aidrus Mosque, Al-Muhdhar Mosque

Islam in Yemen dates back to about 630 AD, when it was introduced by Ali who finalized the conquest of it when Muhammad was still alive. It was during this period that the mosques in Janad (near Ta'izz) and the Great Mosque of Sana'a were built. Yemenis are divided into two principal Islamic religious groups: 65% Sunni and 35% Shia. Others put the numbers of Shias at 30%. The denominations are as follows: 65% primarily of the Shafi'i and other orders of Sunni Islam. 33% of the Zaidi order of Shia Islam, 2% of the Ja'fari and Tayyibi Ismaili orders of Shia Islam. Yemen is home to the Sulaymani Bohra community, a subdivision of Tayyibi Mustali Ismailism. The Sunnis are predominantly in the south and southeast. The Zaidis are predominantly in the north and northwest whilst the Jafaris are in the main centres of the North such as Sana'a and Ma'rib. There are mixed communities in the larger cities.

== Religious minorities ==
=== Judaism ===
Judaism is the oldest Abrahamic religious minority in Yemen. it is believed that the Jewish community in Yemen is one of, if not the oldest Jewish communities in the world continuously living in one place. According to the Jewish tradition and according to archaeological findings, Jews lived in Yemen at least since the seventh century BCE. It is believed that trade was the main motivation of Israelites to immigrate to Yemen. The Jews in Yemen hold a strong position that around 370 C.E., the ruling political authority, Himyarite Kingdom, adopted Judaism. In this period of time, many Yemenis converted into Judaism. This strong position of the Jews lasted until the Ethiopian Christians took control of the country and destroyed their state.

Since 629, Yemen was under the authority of Islam and the Jews became subject to the Muslim rules of Dhimmi (أهل الذمة), and were obliged to pay the protection tax paid by non-Muslims (jizya) الجزية. Nevertheless, Yemeni Jews observed their faith and were able to work. Jews of Yemen were able to keep good connection with other Jewish religious centers, those in the land of Israel itself included. Later, when the Tahiri dynasty ruled the country under the rule of Ahmed Amir, the old synagogue of Sanaa was destroyed in 1457.

At the end of the fifteenth century, the country was not much stable because of the Portuguese navy activities on the south coast of Yemen. European sources show that the Yemeni Jews helped the Portuguese army with the hope of changing their hard circumstances under the Tahiri dynasty. However, the consequences were costly. Some of these Jews were killed, many had to convert to Islam, and others had to migrate to other places. Later, in 1762, Imam al- Mahdi proposed to expel the Jews and to close their remaining synagogues. Thirty years later, Imam 'Ali al- Mansur permitted the Jews to reopened the synagogues. However, "the idea of the expulsion of the Jews was not removed from the minds of the rulers of Yemen". From the early 1880s to 1910, migration was a response to both economic and political volatility in Yemen. The first emigration is dated back to 1882. Further emigration happened during the famine of 1905 until 1914. The Jews immigration from Yemen was not organized by any state or state like actors. However, from 1911, until World War Two, the Zionist movement started to encourage and playing a role in their immigration.

By 1947, the number of the Yemeni Jewish was around 50,000. Jews started to emigrate to Israel; the majority of them arrived there shortly after the state of Israel was established in 1948. This process of transferring the Yemeni Jewish people to the state of Israel in what is called Operation Magic Carpet started in 1949 and lasted until 1951. Nearly all of the country's Jewish population emigrated. This journey from Yemen to the state of Israel was difficult; hundreds of migrants lost their lives while travelling, and many arrived in very poor health. Moshe Shapira, the Israeli minister of Health declared that three thousand Yemeni babies in serious health condition needed urgent hospitalization.

By 1980, there was only around 1,000 Jews in Yemen, most of them isolated. By 2007, the entire Jewish population was around 500 people, they lived in the capital city Sanaa in a compound protected by the Yemeni government. The murder of a Jewish citizen named Moshe Ya'ish al-Nahari in 2008 by a Muslim citizen created a form of religious tension and made many Jewish people feel unsafe, which caused further emigration. Since January 2007, the historic Saada Governorate community of 45 Jews have lived in Sana'a, under the protection and care of the government, after abandoning their homes in the face of threats from al-Houthi rebels. The community has abandoned its synagogues in Saada. As of 2008, fewer than 400 Jews remained in the northern part of the country, primarily in Amran Governorate, and there was at least one functioning synagogue in Amran Governorate. In 2012 Aharon Zindani, a Jewish leader, was stabbed to death; his wife and children emigrated and took his body with them to bury it in Israel.

As of 2022, fewer than 8 Jews remain in Yemen. One of them is Levi Marhabi, who is detained by the Houthi group since 2016.

=== Christianity ===
Christianity is another religious minority in Yemen. The Middle East is the birthplace of Christianity, but Christian communities in the Middle East are decreasing due to reasons such as low birth rates, emigration and persecution. The number of Christians in Yemen is not accurately known, but is estimated to be between 3,000 and 25,000. Among them is a group of Indian-origin immigrants who became Yemeni citizens. A study conducted in 2015 states that around 400 Yemeni people converted from Islam to Christianity. However, the Yemeni criminal code states that conversion from Islam to another religion is apostasy. Apostates from Islam are executed by the death penalty after only being afforded three opportunities and 30 days to recant and return to Islam.

In 2010, Pew-Templeton estimated the number of Christians in Yemen at 40,000, most of whom are not openly Christian, due to persecution of religious minorities. There are 3,000 Christians throughout the country, most of whom are refugees or temporary foreign residents. There are four churches in Aden, three Roman Catholic and one Anglican. In 2014, Ethiopian Orthodox Tewahedo Church services took place weekly in Sana'a, Aden, and other cities.

In 2008, among religious minorities, approximately 1,000 Christians and most Jews actively participated in some form of formal religious service or ritual, although not always in a public place of worship. With the war still going in the country, the Christian minority is badly impacted by the bad situation and is at a higher risk as the armed militias in both the north and south of the country see Christians as enemies.

Christian missionaries and nongovernmental organizations (NGOs) affiliated with missionary groups operate in the country; most restrict their activities to the provision of medical services; others were employed in teaching and social services. Invited by the Government, the Sisters of Charity run homes for the poor and persons with disabilities in Sana'a, Taiz, Hodeida, and Aden. A Swedish mission organization runs a technical school for the disabled and poor in Taiz. There was also a medical mission in Saada, but in January 2007, the mission reportedly fled to escape the fighting. It is believed that they remained in the region to provide medical assistance to victims of the violence. Another mission operated two charitable clinics in Aden.

In spite of the lack of freedom of religion in Yemen, a 2015 global census estimates some 400 Christians from a Muslim background, though not all of them are necessarily Yemeni citizens.

=== Baháʼí Faith ===
The Bahá’í Faith in Yemen is a small but active religious community that has been present in the country since the mid-nineteenth century. There are estimated to be a few thousand Bahá’ís in Yemen, including many from Yemeni tribes and prominent families, alongside long-time residents of Persian origin. Despite their small numbers, Yemeni Bahá’ís have contributed to national life through work in health care, engineering, education, reconciliation initiatives, youth development, and humanitarian relief, while facing severe repression—particularly in areas controlled by the Houthi authorities since 2014.

=== Hinduism ===
Hinduism had about 200,000 adherents in Yemen in 2017 (0.7% of the total population), the majority of whom were from India. There are four active Hindu temples in Aden. The majority of Hindus are from Gujarat, and were present from British times, when it was Aden Colony. In 2022 there were no exact figures, but fewer than 3,000 Indian nationals lived in the country.

== Freedom of religion ==
The constitution states that Islam is the state religion. It provides for freedom of thought and expression, but does not mention freedom of religion. The law prohibits conversion from Islam to another religion and proselytizing directed at Muslims. Apostasy is a capital offense.

Public schools must teach Islam at primary and secondary level. Public schools are required to teach Sunni and Shia students the same curriculum, but this is not enforceable in Houthi-controlled areas, where Zaydi principles are taught. Because the government is concerned that unlicensed religious schools deviate from formal educational requirements and promote militant ideology, it has closed more than 4,500 institutions of this type, and deported foreign students studying there.

In 2023, the country was scored 1 out of 4 for religious freedom by Freedom House, a US think tank. In the same year, the country was ranked as the third-worst country in the world to be a Christian, according to the Christian organization Open Doors.

== See also ==
- Islam in Yemen
- Christianity in Yemen
- Yemenite Jews
- Shia Islam in Yemen
