= Evangelista Latino Enrico Vanni =

Emeritus Roman Catholic bishop

His Excellency, The Most Reverend Evangelista Latino Enrico Vanni OFMCap
- Archbishop of Agra emeritus, Vicar Apostolic of Arabia emeritus
- Church: Catholic Church
- Archdiocese: Agra (till 1955)
- Diocese: Bizya
- Appointed: 15 April 1916 (as Vicar Apostolic of Arabia), 21 Aug 1937 (succeeded as Archbishop of Agra)
- In office: 21 August 1937 to 21 November 1955
- Predecessor: Angelo Raffaele Bernacchioni, [[Order of Friars Minor Capuchin|Emeritus ]]
- Successor: Dominic Romuald Basil Athaide, OFMCap
- Previous posts: Coadjutor Archbishop of Agra (1928–1937), Vicar Apostolic of Arabia (1916–1927), Titular bishop of Tenedus (1916 - 1955)

Orders
- Ordination: 21 June 1901 by Carlo Giuseppe Gentili, OFMCap
- Consecration: 21 September 1916 by Giuseppe Debernardi

Personal details
- Born: Evangelista Latino Enrico Vanni; 28 December 1878 Usella, Cantagallo, Tuscany, Italy
- Died: 9 May 1962 (aged 83) Dehradun, Uttar Pradesh, India

Ordination history of Evangelista Latino Enrico Vanni
History
Priestly ordination
- Ordained by: Carlo Giuseppe Gentili, OFMCap
Episcopal consecration
- Principal consecrator: Archbishop Carlo Giuseppe Gentili, OFMCap
- Co-consecrators: Bishop Giuseppe Angelo Poli, OFMCap, Bishop Fortunat-Henri Caumont, OFMCap
Episcopal succession
Bishops consecrated by Evangelista Latino Enrico Vanni as principal consecrator
- Giovanni Tirinnanzi, OFMCap: 1937
- Guy-Léandre Le Floch, OFMCap: 1939
- Joseph Bartholomew Evangelisti, OFMCap: 1952

Styles of Evangelista Latino Enrico Vanni
- Reference style: His Excellency; The Most Reverend; Monsignor
- Spoken style: Your Excellency
- Religious style: Archbishop

Evangelista Latino Enrico Vanni OFMCap (28 December 1878 – 9 May 1962) was an Italian Bishop and missionary who served as the Apostolic Vicar of Arabia from 1916 to 1927 and the Archbishop of Agra from 1937 to 1955. He also served as the Titular Archbishop of Tenedus from 1916 to 1955 and Titular bishop of Bizya from 1955 until his death.

== Life ==
Evangelista Latino Enrico Vanni was born in Usella, a hamlet of Cantagallo, on 28 December 1878, from a poor and very religious family; Vanni knew from a very young age his determination to enter the seminary.

=== Priestly ministry ===
On 15 March 1894, he took his first vows and received his Alb in the convent of Cortona. A year later, he made his simple profession and the solemn one on 8 December 1898.

On 21 June 1901, he was ordained a priest. He then taught for three years in the Seraphic College of Montevarchi, dedicating himself to preaching at the same time.

However, his greatest desire was to go on a mission. On 8 October 1905, the General Minister of the Order of Friars Minor Capuchin sent him to India, to the Archdiocese of Agra. First opened by the Jesuits in 1579 and then entrusted to the Capuchins in the beginning of the 19th century, subsequently transformed into an Apostolic Vicariate, Agra then had been elevated to an archdiocese by Pope Leo XIII in 1886. That was a time of significant transformation, from a missionary point of view. In the general chapter of 9 May 1884, it was announced that each mission should be entrusted to a Capuchin province. Between 1890 and 1891, the General Curia of the order began negotiations with the Tuscan Province to entrust it with the care of the mission in Agra; a vast territory with 20 million inhabitants, of which about 12000 are Catholics. Vanni arrived in 1905, already 35 Tuscan Capuchins were on a mission. The extraordinary abilities of the young Capuchin emerged immediately. He was the vice-rector of St. Peter's College in Agra, an assistant chaplain in Bareilly, superior of the convent of Barlowgany in Mussoorie, and as a priest of the cathedral of Agra.

=== Episcopal ministry ===
His value to engage with the masses did not go unnoticed in Rome, and on 15 April 1916, Pope Benedict XV appointed him Apostolic Vicar of Arabia and Titular bishop of Tenedo. With humility, he considered himself incapable of holding such a serious office, He received his Episcopal Ordination on 21 September 1916, from the Metropolitan Archbishop of Agra, Carlo Giuseppe Gentili, co-consecrating the coadjutor bishop of Allahabad, Giuseppe Angelo Poli and the Bishop of Ajmer, Fortunat-Henri Caumont.

The situation of the Apostolic Vicariate of Arabia was profoundly different from the Indian mission. Alongside the difficulties of language and relations with the Muslims, it was necessary to change the method of evangelization. Vanni understood that, in order to transmit the Catholic message, it was necessary to act in the world of education and social intervention; orphanages, schools, hospitals were the places of missionary activity. The unfavorable climate in Aden and the Somali Coast, and a worsening of his health conditions forced Vanni to return to Italy and renounce the Vicariate in January 1927.

After a period of convalescence in Prato, he obtained permission to return to India. Although he desired to be a simple missionary, in July 1928, Pope Pius XI appointed him Coadjutor bishop of Agra. He succeeded as Archbishop on 21 August 1937. The Real India, as Gandhi claimed, was that of the villages; it was therefore, necessary to evangelize; to create new schools, and through the construction of churches and houses in smaller centers, to reopen the Sardanha seminary. The years of World War II were challenging; Vanni's objectives, therefore, suffered an abrupt halt. After the end of the conflict, he resumed his work as an evangelizer with renewed vigor; a dozen new schools were established, new missionaries arrived, and in 1949, the seminary reopened. In 1952 Vanni received Bartolomeo Evangelisti from Porretta as coadjutor.

=== Retirement ===
On 21 November 1955, Pope Pius XII accepted his resignation from the Archdiocese of Agra for health reasons and appointed him Titular bishop of Bizia. The fruits of his labor were immediate. On 20 February of the following year, Pope Pius XII established the Diocese of Meerut, entrusting it to the Tuscan Capuchins, while the Archdiocese of Agra was entrusted to the Indian Capuchins, the seminary opened by Vanni undoubtedly given good results. Vanni remained in Meerut, as a simple missionary, surrounded by the affection of all.

== Death ==
Vanni, died in Dehra Dun, at the foothills of the Himalayans on 9 May 1962 at the age of 83.

Catholic Church titles
Preceded by Raffaele Filippo Presutti, OFMCap	Apostolic Vicar of Arabia; 15 April 1916 – January 1927	Succeeded by Pacifico Tiziano Micheloni, OFMCap
Preceded by Angelo Raffaele Bernacchioni, OFMCap	Archbishop of Agra; 21 August 1937 to 21 November 1955	Succeeded by Dominic Romuald Basil Athaide, OFMCap
