= Irzio Luigi Magliacani =

Emeritus Vicar Apostolic of Arabia

His Excellency, The Most Reverend Irzio Luigi Magliacani O.F.M. Cap.
- Emeritus Vicar Apostolic of Arabia
- Church: Catholic Church
- Diocese: Dium
- See: Apostolic Vicariate of Arabia
- In office: 23 October 1948 to 4 November 1969
- Predecessor: Giovanni Battista Tirinanzi, OFM Cap.
- Successor: Giovanni Bernardo Gremoli, OFM Cap.

Orders
- Ordination: 20 March 1915
- Consecration: 28 May 1950 by Elia Cardinal Dalla Costa

Personal details
- Born: Irzio Luigi Magliacani; 16 February 1892 Castel del Piano, Province of Grosseto, Kingdom of Italy
- Died: 15 March 1976 (aged 84) Grosseto, Tuscany, Italy
- Denomination: Catholic

Ordination history of Irzio Luigi Magliacani
History
Episcopal consecration
- Principal consecrator: Cardinal Elia Dalla Costa
- Co-consecrators: Archbishop Evangelista Latino Enrico Vanni, O.F.M. Cap. Bishop Ireneo Enrico Chelucci

Styles of Irzio Luigi Magliacani
- Reference style: His Excellency; The Most Reverend; Monsignor
- Spoken style: Your Excellency
- Religious style: Bishop

Irzio Luigi Magliacani OFM Cap. (16 February 1892 – 15 March 1976) was an Italian bishop and missionary who served as the Apostolic Vicar of Arabia from 23 October 1948 to 4 November 1969, he also served as the Titular Bishop of Dium. He was the last Vicar of Arabia who had his cathedra (throne) in Aden.

== Life ==
In March of 1915, Magliacani was ordained to the priesthood and became Capuchin; soon after his ordination, he was transferred to Agra in 1920; as the mission in Arabia required more personnel, he was transferred to Aden in 1939. In October of 1948, right after World War 2, Pope Pius XII appointed him as the Apostolic Administrator of Arabia after the resignation of Msgr. Tirinanzi. On 25 December 1949, he was nominated as Titular Bishop of Dium and The Apostolic Vicar of Arabia. He was consecrated as a bishop by the Archbishop of Florence, Cardinal Elia Dalla Costa, in Florence on 28 May 1950.

Magliacani was quick to assess the situation following World War 2 and fulfilled the urgent requirement for churches and personnel in Somalia, Yemen, and Bahrain; by this time in the 1950s, as the nations in the Persian Gulf were striking oil, Magliacani saw the rising prominence of the mission in Bahrain. During these years, events in South Yemen were taking a turn for the worse after the British left Aden in 1967, and Communists soon took control.

In 1962, land was donated by the Sheikhs in the Emirates to the Catholic Church and soon St. Joseph's Church in Abu Dhabi and St. Mary's Church in Dubai were built. In the same year Magliacani attended The Second Ecumenical Council of the Vatican, he took part in all the four periods of the council as a council father.

On 4 November 1969, Irzio Luigi Maglacani resigned as Apostolic Vicar of Arabia.

== Death ==
He died on 15 March 1976. (presumably in Grosseto)

Catholic Church titles
Preceded by Giovanni Battista Tirinanzi, OFM Cap.	Apostolic Vicar of Arabia; 23 October 1948 to 4 November 1969	Succeeded by Giovanni Bernardo Gremoli, OFM Cap.
