= Apostolic Vicariate of Aden =

Former Catholic Missionary Jurisdiction

The Apostolic Vicariate of Aden was the First Vicariate created in Arabia, It was established in 1888 and in 1889, it was dissolved and renamed into the Apostolic Vicariate of Arabia.

== History ==
The territory was originally part of the Vicariate Apostolic of the Gallas, which covered the entire Arabian Peninsula and Somaliland, but it was separated into an Apostolic Prefecture by Pope Pius IX on 21 January 1875. On 25 April 1888, Pope Leo XIII then created the Apostolic Vicariate of Aden, located in Yemen and within a year it was redrawn and renamed into the Apostolic Vicariate of Arabia on June 28, 1889.

== Prefects of Aden ==
1. Cardinal Guglielmo Massaia, OFMCap (12 May 1846 – 1854)
2. Luigi Sturla (1854 – 1858)
3. Giovenale da Tortosa, OFMCap (1858 – 1864)
4. Louis-Callixte Lasserre, OFMCap (12 October 1871 – 04 May 1888) and (04 May 1888 – 28 June 1889) as Apostolic Vicar.
