= Apostolic Vicariate of Arabia =

Former Catholic Missionary Jurisdiction

Apostolic Vicariate of Arabia Apostolicus Vicariatus Arabiæ النيابة الرسولية للجزيرة العربية

Information
- First holder: Louis-Callixte Lasserre, OFM Cap.
- Formation: 28 June 1889
- Sui iuris church: Latin Church
- Rite: Roman Rite
- Dissolved: 31 May 2011
- Cathedral: St. Francis of Assisi Cathedral, Aden (1892–1983); St. Joseph's Cathedral, Abu Dhabi (1983–2011)
- Language: Ecclesiastical Latin; Arabic; English language; Filipino language; French language; German language; Italian language; Konkani language; Korean language; Malayalam; Marathi language; Polish language; Sinhala language; Spanish language; Tagalog language; Tamil language; Ukrainian language; Urdu

Leadership
- Last holder: Paul Hinder

The Apostolic Vicariate of Arabia (Latin: Vicariatus Apostolicus Arabiæ) was an apostolic vicariate of the Catholic Church with territorial jurisdiction for Bahrain, Kuwait, Oman, Qatar, Saudi Arabia, Somalia, United Arab Emirates and Yemen. The last Apostolic Vicar is Msgr. Paul Hinder, OFM Cap.

== History ==
The territory was originally part of the Vicariate Apostolic of the Gallas, but it was separated into an apostolic prefecture by Pope Pius IX on 21 January 1875. On 25 April 1888, Pope Leo XIII made the Apostolic Vicariate of Aden, located in Yemen. On the 28 June 1889, the name was changed to the Apostolic Vicariate of Arabia, responsible for the countries of the Arabian Peninsula and surrounding region: Bahrain, Oman, Saudi Arabia, Qatar, United Arab Emirates, Somalia and Yemen. The Vicariate was entrusted to the Capuchin Franciscans of Lyon, France until 1916. In 1915, The Congregation for the Propagation of Faith was looking to establish a capuchin province in the Arabian Peninsula which could bring back stability to the mission in the region, and in 1916 the Vicariate was entrusted to the Capuchins of the Tuscan Province in Florence, Italy.

For many years, Capuchins and other priest had come but could not cope with the harsh reality of the Arabian Peninsula and left after a short stay, most of the missionaries came from neighboring provinces like Agra in The British Raj (India) where the Tuscan Province had a flourishing mission, most of the Apostolic Vicars came from India. The missionaries who had come from India were ready to fulfil the need of the populace.

Friars invited other priest, nuns and religious congregations to assist with the mission in Arabia, they completely reorganized and expanded the schools which was much appreciated by the local population. Msgr. Evangelista Latino Enrico Vanni, OFM Cap. and Msgr. Pacifico Tiziano Micheloni, OFM Cap. concentrated their efforts on Aden and the Somali coast. Msgr. Giovanni Battista Tirinanzi, OFM Cap. made a historic step by visiting Bahrain in 1939 when he heard of the presence of Catholics on the island nation, In an audience with the ruler H.H. Hamad ibn Isa Al Khalifa; the catholic church was granted a plot of land to build a church and Sacred Heart Church, the first church in the Persian Gulf region was built and blessed on 8 March 1940.

In 1948, Msgr. Irzio Luigi Magliacani, OFM Cap. was quick to assess the situation following World War II and fulfilled the urgent requirement for churches and personnel in Somalia, Yemen, and Bahrain; Msgr. Magliacani saw the rising prominence of the mission in Bahrain. There was a priest stationed in Bahrain and later more priests were added who would visit the United Arab Emirates, Oman and Yemen. On 29 June 1953, the territorial jurisdiction of Bahrain was split from the Apostolic Vicariate of Arabia and the Apostolic Prefecture of Kuwait (now Apostolic Vicariate of Northern Arabia) was established. In 1962, land was donated by the Sheikhs in the United Arab Emirates to the Catholic Church and soon St. Joseph's Church in Abu Dhabi and St. Mary's Church in Dubai were built.

During this time events in South Yemen were taking a turn for the worse after the British left Aden in 1967, and Communists soon took control; churches were closed, the government took over Catholic schools and orphanages, nuns and most priests sent away and deported. Due to this, in 1974 the see of the Apostolic Vicar was transferred from Proto-Cathedral St. Francis of Assisi, Aden, Yemen to St. Joseph's Church, Abu Dhabi, United Arab Emirates. Msgr. Giovanni Bernardo Gremoli, OFM Cap. was appointed as Apostolic Vicar in 1975. His most urgent task was fulfilling the need of clerical personnel in Arabia. As Tuscany could not fulfill the needs of the Vicariate, Msgr. Gremoli turned to other provinces like India, the Philippine, Lebanon and so on.

Msgr. Gremoli then turned his attention to building churches for the Catholics who were pouring into the Persian Gulf as a result of the oil boom. Msgr. Gremoli built, expanded and renovated at least 12 church complexes and also extended and built new schools. As Msgr. Gremoli retired in 2005 he entrusted the Vicariate to his Axillary Msgr. Paul Hinder, who was the last Apostolic Vicar of Arabia.

== List of Apostolic Vicars of Arabia ==
1. Louis-Callixte Lasserre, OFM Cap. (1888 – April 1900)
2. Bernard Thomas Edward Clark, OFM Cap. (21 March 1902 – 18 June 1910)
3. Raffaele Filippo Presutti, OFM Cap. (13 September 1910 – 1915)
4. Evangelista Latino Enrico Vanni, OFM Cap. (15 April 1916 – 1925)
5. Pacifico Tiziano Micheloni, OFM Cap. (25 April 1933 – 6 July 1936)
6. Giovanni Tirinnanzi, OFM Cap. (2 July 1937 – 27 January 1949)
7. Irzio Luigi Magliacani, OFM Cap. (25 December 1949 – 1969)
8. Giovanni Bernardo Gremoli, OFM Cap. (2 October 1975 – 21 March 2005)
9. Paul Hinder, OFM Cap. (21 March 2005 – 31 May 2011)

== Restructuring of The Apostolic Vicariate of Arabia ==
On 31 May 2011, with a decree by the Congregation of the Evangelization of Peoples, the Apostolic Vicariate of Arabia was divided, restructured and redrawn into two: The Apostolic Vicariate of Northern Arabia (Bahrain, Qatar, Kuwait and Saudi Arabia) with residence and see of the Bishop in Awali, Bahrain and The Apostolic Vicariate of Southern Arabia (United Arab Emirates, Oman and Yemen) with the residence and see of the Bishop in Abu Dhabi, United Arab Emirates.

== See also ==
- Eugine Mattioli
- Vicariate Apostolic of the Gallas
- Apostolic Vicariate of Aden
- Apostolic Vicariate of Northern Arabia
- Apostolic Vicariate of Southern Arabia
