= Raffaele Filippo Presutti =

Italian prelate of the Catholic Church (1845–1914)

His Excellency, The Most Reverend Raffaele Filippo Presutti OFMCap
- Emeritus Vicar Apostolic of Arabia
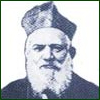
- Church: Catholic Church
- Diocese: Anchialus
- See: Apostolic Vicariate of Arabia
- Appointed: 13 September 1910
- Installed: 13 September 1910
- Term ended: 3 August 1914
- Predecessor: Bernard Thomas Edward Clark, OFMCap
- Successor: Evangelista Latino Enrico Vanni, OFMCap

Orders
- Ordination: 8 December 1868
- Consecration: 30 November 1910 by Carlo Giuseppe Gentili OFMCap

Personal details
- Born: 9 January 1845 Recanati, Province of Macerata, Marche, Italy
- Died: 3 August 1914 (aged 69) Keren, Italian Eritrea

Ordination history of Raffaele Filippo Presutti
History
Episcopal consecration
- Principal consecrator: Archbishop Carlo Giuseppe Gentili, OFMCap
- Co-consecrators: Bishop Petronio Francesco Gramigna, OFMCap; Bishop Fabien Antoine Eestermans, OFMCap

Raffaele Filippo Presutti OFMCap (8 January 1845 – 3 August 1914) was an Italian Bishop and Missionary who served as the Apostolic Vicar of Arabia from 13 September 1910 to his death on 3 August 1914; he also served as the Titular Bishop of Anchial.

== Life ==
On 13 September 1910, Pope Pius X appointed Presutti Apostolic Vicar of Arabia and Titular Bishop of Anchial. On 30 November 1910, he was consecrated bishop by the Archbishop of Agra, Carlo Giuseppe Gentili, OFMCap. The co-consecrators were Bishop of Allahabad, Petronio Francesco Gramigna OFMCap, and Bishop of Lahore, Fabien Antoine Eestermans OFMCap.

== Death ==
Presutti died in Keren, Italian Eritrea, on 3 August 1914.

Styles of Raffaele Filippo Presutti
- Reference style: His Excellency; The Most Reverend; Monsignor
- Spoken style: Your Excellency
- Religious style: Bishop

Catholic Church titles
Preceded by Bernard Thomas Edward Clark, OFMCap	Apostolic Vicar of Arabia; 13 September 1910 to 3 August 1914	Succeeded by Evangelista Latino Enrico Vanni, OFMCap
