= Bernard Thomas Edward Clark =

Emeritus Roman Catholic Bishop

His Excellency, The Most Reverend Bernard Thomas Edward Clark O.F.M. Cap.
- Emeritus Vicar Apostolic of Arabia, Emeritus Bishop of Port Victoria o Seychelles
- Church: Catholic Church
- Diocese: Tingi
- Appointed: 21 March 1902 (as Vicar Apostolic of Arabia), 10 June 1910 (succeeded as Bishop of Port of Victoria)
- In office: 10 June 1910 to 26 September 1915
- Predecessor: Marc Hudrisier
- Successor: Georges-Jean-Damascène Lachavanne
- Previous post: Vicar Apostolic of Arabia (1902 - 1910)

Orders
- Ordination: 1881
- Consecration: 1 June 1902 by Pierre-Hector Coullié

Personal details
- Born: Bernard Thomas Edward Clark; 12 November 1856 London, England
- Died: 26 September 1915 (aged 58) Port of Victoria, Seychelles
- Denomination: Catholic

Ordination history of Bernard Thomas Edward Clark
History
Priestly ordination
- Date: 1881
Episcopal consecration
- Principal consecrator: Cardinal [Pierre-Hector Coullié ]]
- Co-consecrators: Bishop Louis-Callixte Lasserre, O.F.M. Cap. Bishop Michel Marc Hudrisier, O.F.M. Cap.
- Date: 1 June 1902

Styles of Bernard Thomas Edward Clark
- Reference style: His Excellency; The Most Reverend; Monsignor
- Spoken style: Your Excellency
- Religious style: Bishop

Bernard Thomas Edward Clark (12 November 1856 - 26 September 1915) was an English Catholic Bishop and Missionary.

== Life ==
Bernard Thomas Edward Clark was born in London on 12 November 1856. He joined the Capuchin Province of Paris in 1874 and was ordained in December 1881.

=== Episcopal ministry ===
On 21 March 1902, Pope Leo XIII appointed him as Apostolic Vicar of Arabia and Titular Bishop of Tingis. On 1 June 1902, he was consecrated by the Archbishop of Lyon, Cardinal Pierre-Héctor Culier; the Co-Consecrators were The Titular Bishop of Marocco o Marruecos, Bishop Louis-Calixte Victor Lacerre, and the Bishop of Port Victoria o Seychelles, Mike Udischel.

Clark served as the Apostolic Vicar of Arabia from 21 March 1902 to 18 June 1910. On 10 June 1910, Pope Pius X appointed him as the Bishop of Port Victoria o Seychelles.

== Death ==
Clark died on 26 September 1915 in Port Victoria at the age of 58.

Catholic Church titles
Preceded by Louis-Callixte Lasserre, OFM Cap.	Apostolic Vicar of Arabia; 21 March 1902 to 18 June 1910	Succeeded by Raffaele Filippo Presutti, OFM Cap.
Preceded by Marc Hudrisier	Bishop of Port Victoria o Seychelles; 10 June 1910 to 26 September 1915	Succeeded by Georges-Jean-Damascène Lachavanne
