= Louis-Callixte Lasserre =

Emeritus Roman Catholic Bishop

His Excellency, The Most Reverend Louis-Callixte Lasserre OFMCap
- Emeritus Vicar Apostolic of Arabia
- Church: Catholic Church
- Diocese: Marocco o Marruecos
- See: Apostolic Vicariate of Arabia
- In office: 25 April 1888 to April 1900
- Successor: Bernard Thomas Edward Clark, OFMCap

Orders
- Consecration: 10 December 1882 by Louis-Taurin Cahagne

Personal details
- Born: Louis-Callixte Lasserre; March 6, 1839 Castel del Piano, France.
- Died: August 22, 1903 (aged 64)
- Denomination: Catholic

Louis-Callixte Lasserre, OFMCap was a French Capuchin. He served as a bishop and missionary in the Middle East and Africa.

== Life ==
Louis was born in Morestel on 6 April 1839; at the age of 23, he joined the seminary on 22 August 1862 and was ordained a priest of the Order of Friars Minor Capuchins. On 15 March 1881, Pope Leo XIII'appointed him as Titular bishop of Marocco o Marruecos and Coadjutor Vicar Apostolic of Galla; he was consecrated on 10 December 1882 by The Vicar Apostolic of Galla, Bishop Louis-Taurin Cahagne, OFMCap

Louis was supposed to succeed as the Vicar Apostolic of Galla. However, Pope Leo XIII appointed him as Prefect of Arabia in 1886, then as Vicar Apostolic of Aden on 25 April 1888. The Apostolic Vicariate of Aden was renamed, restructured, and redrawn as The Apostolic Vicariate of Arabia and Msgr. Louis was named Vicar Apostolic of Arabia. In April 1900, he resigned from the Vicariate at 60 and died three years later on 22 August 1903.

Catholic Church titles
Preceded by Position Established	Apostolic Vicar of Arabia; 28 June 1889 to April 1900	Succeeded by Bernard Thomas Edward Clark, OFMCap
Preceded by Position Established	Vicar Apostolic of Aden; 04 May 1888 to 28 June 1889	Succeeded by Position Dissolved
Preceded by Giovenale da Tortosa, OFMCap	Apostolic Prefect of Aden; 12 October 1871 to 04 May 1888	Succeeded by Position Dissolved
