= San Lorenzo a Fossato, Cantagallo =

Church in Prato province, Italy

Coordinates: 44°04′38.6″N 11°03′41.0″E

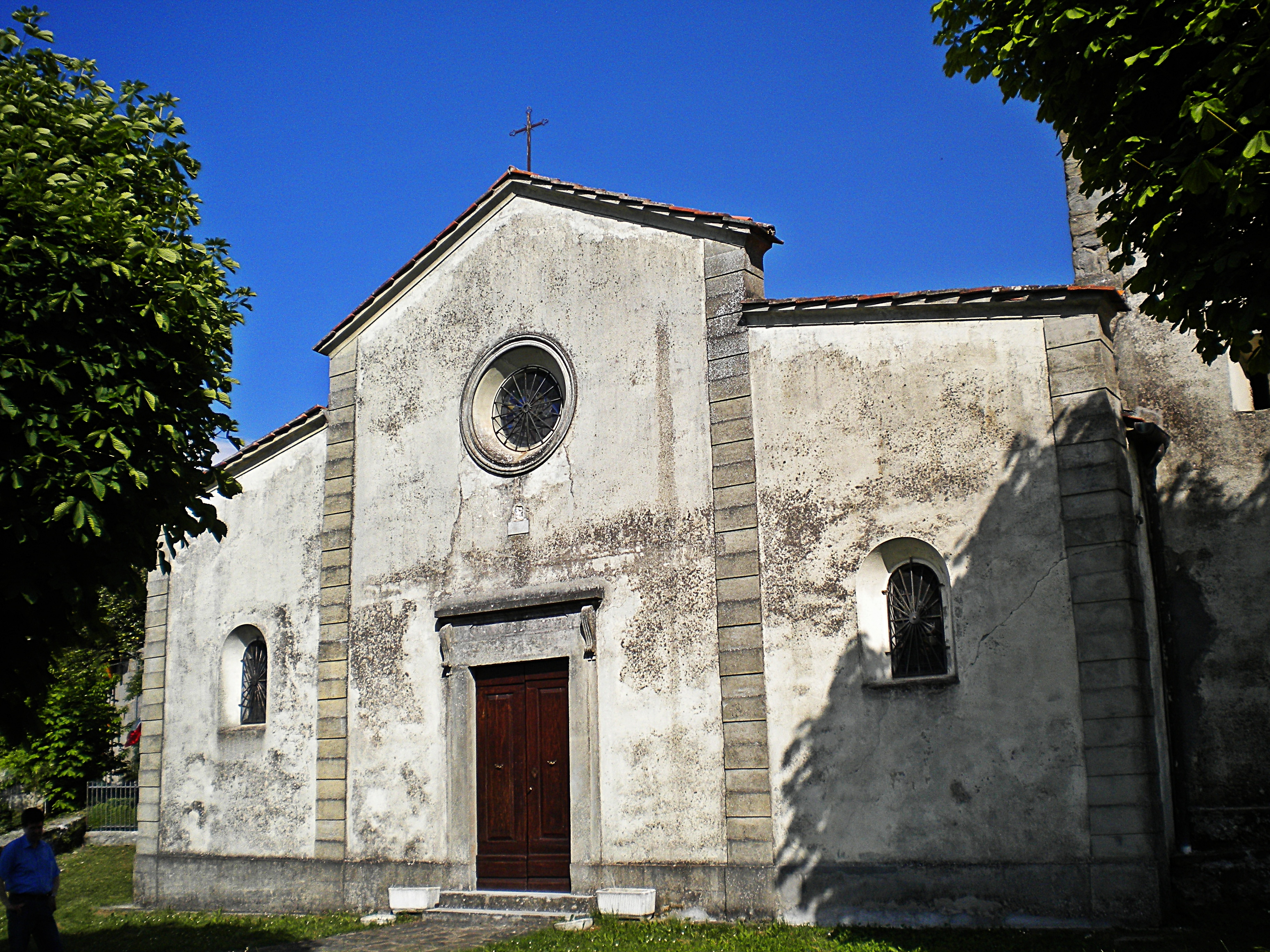

San Lorenzo a Fossato is a Renaissance-style, Roman Catholic church located in the frazione or neighborhood of Fossato, within the limits of the town of Cantagallo in the Province of Prato, region of Tuscany, Italy.

== History ==
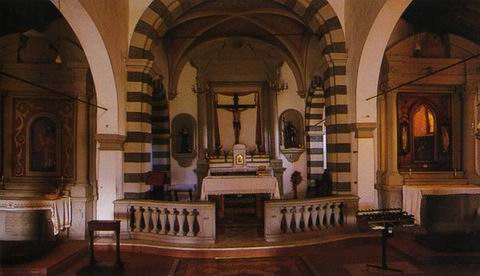
Interior of church

A church at the site was erected in the 11th century, under the administration of the former abbey of San Salvatore in Fontana Taona, located near the town of Sambuca Pistoiese. This abbey first belonged to the Benedictine order, but was then given to the Vallombrosian order, and suppressed by the 16th century.

The present layout of this church derives from a reconstruction circa 1580, which added the lateral aisles. The simple facade with an oculus was completed in the 19th century. The belltower was originally built in the 15th century. Above the main altar is a wooden crucifix carved by the brothers Chimenti and Leonardo del Tasso in 1497. The crucifix originally was made for and kept in the Vallombrosian church of San Pancrazio, Florence, and moved here in 1813. The walls of the nave have a majolica Via Crucis dating to after 1746, when the items were popularized by the sermons of St Leonardo da Porto Maurizio.

== Sources ==
- Derived mainly from Italian Wikipedia entry
