= Pacifico Tiziano Micheloni =

Italian prelate of the Catholic Church (1881–1936)

His Excellency, The Most Reverend Pacifico Tiziano Micheloni O.F.M. Cap.
- Emeritus Vicar Apostolic of Arabia
- Church: Catholic Church
- Diocese: Lethe
- See: Apostolic Vicariate of Arabia
- Appointed: 25 April 1933
- Installed: 25 April 1933
- Term ended: 6 July 1936
- Predecessor: Evangelista Latino Enrico Vanni
- Successor: Giovanni Battista Tirinanzi
- Previous post: Apostolic Administrator of Arabia (1928–1933)

Orders
- Ordination: 19 September 1903
- Consecration: 8 September 1933 by Giuseppe Debernardi

Personal details
- Born: March 8, 1881 Vernio, Province of Prato, Tuscany, Italy
- Died: 7 June 1936 (aged 55) Rome, Italy

Ordination history of Pacifico Tiziano Micheloni
History
Episcopal consecration
- Principal consecrator: Giuseppe Debernardi
- Co-consecrators: Angelo Simonetti; Paolino Giovanni Tribbioli

Styles of Pacifico Tiziano Micheloni
- Reference style: His Excellency; The Most Reverend; Monsignor
- Spoken style: Your Excellency
- Religious style: Bishop

Pacifico Tiziano Micheloni OFM Cap. (8 March 1881 – 6 July 1936 ) was an Italian bishop and missionary who served as the Apostolic Vicar of Arabia from 25 April 1933 to 6 July 1936, he also served as the Titular Bishop of Lete.

== Life ==
Monsignor Pacifico Tiziano Micheloni was born in Vernio on 8 March 1881 to Petronio Paoletti and Rosa Paoletti. He entered the novitiate on 11 April 1896, and he completed his novitiate in Montepulciano and continued his studies in Arezzo. and was ordained a priest on 15 August 1901. He was then sent to England to learn the English language. From 1907 he worked in Agra and from 1920 in Aden, there he was Secretary of the Bishop and Capuchin Superior.

In 1928 he was appointed Apostolic Administrator of Arabia and one of the first problems that faced him was the Somalian Mission, After having studied the numerous documents concerning the mission in that vast territory and having thoroughly investigated the advisability of opening a mission among the numerous Tribes, Father Micheloni understood that the time had come to move into more territory. Despite the difficulties encountered from the Governor of the Protectorate of British Somalia, who did not like the presence of Catholic missionaries, in 1930, Father Micheloni first managed to obtain a residence permit in Berbera from the British Empire for no more than four months a year, and subsequently the right to stop on the plateau for seven months a year and to be able to travel throughout British Somalia. Father Micheloni was the first to make use of the permits, and this allowed him in the months of May and June 1931, to travel throughout Somalia, where he organized numerous meetings with Somali Catholics and tribal leaders who requested the need for missionaries in their area.

=== Episcopal Ministry in Arabia ===
On 25 April 1933, Pius XI appointed him Apostolic Vicar of Arabia and Titular Bishop of Lete. He received episcopal ordination on 8 September from the Bishop of Pistoia and Prato, Giuseppe Debernardi and co-consecrating were the Bishop of Pescia, Angelo Simonetti and Bishop of Imola, Paolino Giovanni Tribbioli.

The following year Msgr. Micheloni returned to the Vicariate, where he was able to maintain diplomatic relations with The British Empire to expand the missionary presence in Somalia, which, at that time, consisted of only one religious, Father Adolfo da Lasalla. The difficulties were numerous. An initial disapproval from the British Authorities, all be expressed unofficially, was followed by a severe stiffening of the permissions granted, motivated by "alleged" street demonstrations by the Missionaries. Msgr. Micheloni hence rushed to Berbera, where he discovered that there had been only a small demonstration. Msgr, Micheloni later stated that – "the governor, moved by fears for himself and the religious, regretted the concessions and had himself staged the demonstration to justify the sudden change. The reality, however, was substantially different" Msgr. Micheloni traveled all over Somalia again, with the company of a young Christian, and often had numerous requests to remain in the Villages without ever being marked as inconsiderate.

He paid particular attention to the numerous Orphanages in Aden. "They are fine – he wrote in 1932 – but they will not be able to thrive until they can be transported to Somalia. All the orphans are Somalis and are uncomfortable in the climate of Aden". On the other hand, the schools generally welcome older children and, almost always, with their families on the spot, had more impact on the future of the mission. At the time, there were seventeen Government Schools, including five of the mission in Aden. The latter, however, had a higher number of pupils than the others. There was no lack of problems, primarily due to the presence of Catholic and Muslim students, in the same classes with considerable risks for education to the Catholic faith.

== Death ==
Unfortunately, the extended stay in Aden slowly but surely took a toll on the young bishop's health, who was forced to leave the mission and left for Italy, he died in Rome on 6 June 1936 at the age of 55.

Catholic Church titles
Preceded by Evangelista Latino Enrico Vanni, OFM Cap.	Apostolic Vicar of Arabia; 25 April 1933 to 6 July 1936	Succeeded by Giovanni Battista Tirinanzi, OFM Cap.
