= Diocese of Lethe =

The Diocese of Lethe (Latin: Dioecesis Letaea), was a bishopric of the Roman province of Macedonia Prima in the civil diocese of the same name. Lethe was located in the area of Aïvati (Khaïvati), which is situated west of Lake Koroneia in Greece. The bishopric was a suffragan of the archbishopric of Thessalonica.

== History ==
The exact location of Lethe is unknown to Michel Le Quien, the author of the work Oriens Christianus. However, the area was identified as Aïvati (Khaïvati) west of Lake Koroneia in Greece. Lethe was one of the ancient bishoprics of the Roman province of Macedonia Prima in the civil diocese of the same name, a suffragan of the archdiocese of Thessalonica.

Since the 18th century, Lethe has been included among the titular bishopric sees of the Catholic Church. The seat has been vacant since February 1, 2022.

== Titular ordinaries (Roman Catholic) ==
- Carlo Cosenza (1728–1732)
- Anton Joseph von Lamberg (1733–1757)
- Juan Lario y Lancis (1757–1764)
- Karl Friedrich von Zehmen (1765–1798)
- Michael Francis Buttigieg (1863–1864)
- Tobias Kirby (1881–1886)
- Filippo Degni di Salento (1886–1913)
- Karl Reth (1916–1933)
- Pacifico Tiziano Micheloni, O.F.M. Cap. (1933–1936)
- Benigno Luciano Migliorini, O.F.M. (1937–1941)
- Peter William Bartholome (1941–1953)
- John Joseph U Win (1954–1959)
- Anthony Denis Galvin, M.H.M. (1960–1976)
- Patrick Dougherty (1976–1983)
- Angelo (William Thomas) Acerra, O.S.B. (1983–1990)
- Carlos José Ñáñez (1990–1995)
- Jesús Murgui Soriano (1996–2003)
- Antonio Ortega Franco, C.O. (2004–2022)
