= Giovanni Battista Tirinnanzi =

Italian prelate of the Catholic Church (1869–1949)

His Excellency, The Most Reverend Giovanni Battista Tirinanzi O.F.M. Cap.
- Emeritus Vicar Apostolic of Arabia
- Church: Catholic Church
- Diocese: Gaza
- See: Apostolic Vicariate of Arabia
- Appointed: 2 July 1937
- In office: 2 July 1937 to 21 October 1948
- Predecessor: Pacifico Tiziano Micheloni, OFM Cap.
- Successor: Irzio Luigi Magliacani, OFM Cap.
- Previous post: Vicar General of Agra

Orders
- Ordination: 11 October 1891
- Consecration: 28 October 1937 by Evangelista Latino Enrico Vanni

Personal details
- Born: Giovanni Battista Tirinanzi; March 28, 1869 Florence, Tuscany, Italy
- Died: January 27, 1949 (aged 79) Florence, Tuscany, Italy
- Denomination: Catholic

Ordination history of Giovanni Battista Tirinnanzi
History
Episcopal consecration
- Principal consecrator: Evangelista Latino Enrico Vanni
- Co-consecrators: Giuseppe Angelo Poli; Mathurin-Pie Le Ruyet

Styles of Giovanni Battista Tirinanzi
- Reference style: His Excellency; The Most Reverend; Monsignor
- Spoken style: Your Excellency
- Religious style: Bishop

Giovanni Battista Tirinanzi OFM Cap. (March 26, 1869 – January 27, 1949) was an Italian Bishop and Missionary who served as the Apostolic Vicar of Arabia from 2 July 1937 to 21 October 1948 as well as the Titular Bishop of Gaza.

== Life ==
Giovanni Battista Tirinnanzi was born in Florence on 26 March 1869. He entered the novitiate on 4 January 1887, made his solemn profession on 20 February 1891, and was ordained a priest on 11 October of the same year. He left for Agra on 25 December 1894 and was immediately admired and esteemed for his spirit of initiative and versatile resourcefulness. After having been in charge of various missionary stations, he was nominated as superior of the capuchin province in Sardhana and played a large part in setting up and opening the Capuchin Novitiate in Sardhana(Meerut).

When he was nominated bishop, he was Vicar General of the Archdiocese of Agra. Appointed titular bishop of Gaza and Apostolic Vicar of Arabia on 2 July. On 28 October 1937, he was ordained bishop by Archbishop of Agra Evangelista Latino Enrico Vanni, OFM Cap, and the co-consecrators were Giuseppe Angelo Poli, OFM Cap. Bishop of Allahabad and Mathurin-Pie Le Ruyet, OFM Cap. Bishop of Ajmer and Tirinnanzi arrived in Aden on 7 November 1937.

=== In Arabia ===
Despite the hostile climatic conditions, they were improved by the fact that the government had opened some wells in Shaykh'Uthman (an oasis 10 miles from the city of Aden), the activity of Msgr. Tirinnanzi was actively ruined. His first concern was the school through which - he wrote - "missionaries can obtain in Aden that respect and attention that bring people closer to the truths of the faith, primarily when other means cannot be used."

He, therefore, increased the male attendance at St Anthony's Boys' School at Steamer Point, directed by three Marist Brothers, who were esteemed for the seriousness of teaching and discipline. Recognized and financed by the government to be open to anyone who requested it, as it could not satisfy all admission requests, and an expansion wasn't possible, as the Marist Brothers were unable to provide additional personnel. Other Vicariate schools were that of Crater, were reserved for orphans and directed by a priest, and the female ones (from Stramer Point and Crater) directed by the Franciscan Tertiary Sisters of Calais. These acts were also praised by the Jewish community in a letter addressed to the bishop on the occasion of Pius XI's death and the election of Pius XII.

The missionary enthusiasm of Archbishop Tirinnanzi found an almost insurmountable obstacle in the lack of personnel: in fact, he had only 4 priests available. However, his greatest desire was to resume his activity outside Aden: he was confident that much could still be done, despite a common belief to the contrary, based on the widespread opinion that the Vicariate should only take care of Catholics, most of them who came from India. He continually requested to be able to go into the Arabian Peninsula and to be able to obtain the continuous residence of a missionary in Somalia, together with the possibility of building a church.

The conviction that it was necessary to get out of Aden did not leave him: he realized, therefore, that there were good hopes of reopening a church in Hodeida and to open a mission in Zahege, a sultanate under English domination who confirmed the existence of some Christian tribes in the interior of Arabia which had lost their independence and which was impossible to reach. In Aden, he laid the foundations for the construction of a new church. Nevertheless, the difficulties were considerable. And Msgr. Tirinnanzi had the opportunity to present his challenges in 1939 to Cardinal Tisserant, in which he outlined the characteristics of the Muslim faith. Msgr. Tirinnanzi, made a historic step by visiting Bahrain in 1939 when he heard of the presence of Catholics on the island nation, In an audience with the ruler H.H. Hamad ibn Isa Al Khalifa; the catholic church was granted a plot of land to build a church and Sacred Heart Church, the first church in the Persian Gulf region was built and blessed on 8 March 1940.

=== World War II ===
As the world was on the brink of another worldwide conflict in 1939, The occupying British forces in Yemen were not pleased with an Italian in their colony; Msgr. Tirinnanzi hence had to return to Italy in 1940. Travel and mission work during World War II was considered dangerous and hazardous, and Msgr. Tirinnanzi could only return to Aden in 1947. On 21 October 1948, Pius XII accepted his resignation from the pastoral care of the Vicariate due to poor health.

== Death ==
He retired to the convent of Montughi, Florence, in whose infirmary he died on 27 January 1949, at the age of 79.

Catholic Church titles
Preceded by Pacifico Tiziano Micheloni, OFM Cap.	Apostolic Vicar of Arabia; 2 July 1937 to 21 October 1948	Succeeded by Irzio Luigi Magliacani, OFM Cap.
