= Giovanni Bernardo Gremoli =

Emeritus Vicar Apostolic of Arabia

His Excellency, The Most Reverend Giovanni Bernardo Gremoli O.F.M. Cap.
- Emeritus Vicar Apostolic of Arabia
- Church: Catholic Church
- Diocese: Masuccaba
- See: Apostolic Vicariate of Arabia
- Installed: 2 October 1975
- Term ended: 21 March 2005
- Predecessor: Irzio Luigi Magliacani, OFM Cap.
- Successor: Paul Hinder, OFM Cap.

Orders
- Ordination: 4 July 1967
- Consecration: 22 February 1976 by Agnelo Cardinal Rossi

Personal details
- Born: Giovanni Bernardo Gremoli; June 30, 1926 Poppi, Italy
- Died: July 6, 2017 (aged 91) Florence, Italy
- Buried: Poppi, Toscana, Italy
- Education: Pontifical Urbanian University, Rome.

Styles of Giovanni Bernardo Gremoli
- Reference style: His Excellency; The Most Reverend; Monsignor
- Spoken style: Your Excellency
- Religious style: Bishop

Ordination history of Giovanni Bernardo Gremoli
History
Priestly ordination
- Date: 17 February 1951
Episcopal consecration
- Principal consecrator: Cardinal Agnelo Rossi
- Co-consecrators: Bishop Giovanni Bianchi; Bishop Telesforo Giovanni Cioli, O. Carm.
- Date: 22 February 1976

Giovanni Bernardo Gremoli (30 June 1926 – 6 July 2017) was a Roman Catholic bishop. Born in Italy, Gremoli was ordained to the priesthood in 1951. Gremoli served as titular bishop of Masuccaba and was Vicar Apostolic of Arabia from 1976 to 2005. During this time, he spent a lot of time in St. Joseph's Cathedral, Abu Dhabi and he is one of the people credited with establishing the presence of the Catholic church in the Arabian Peninsula. He was succeeded by Paul Hinder.

== Life ==
Giovanni Gremoli was born on 30 June 1926 in Poppi (Arezzo) in Italy, the second of six children, and grew up on his family's large farm. In 1942 he entered the Capuchins of the Tuscan Province and made his first religious profession on 15 August 1943. On 17 February 1951, he was ordained a priest in Florence. He then specialized in missiology and obtained a degree in canon law at the Pontifical Urbanian University in Rome.

In 1954 he was appointed mission secretary of the Capuchins in Florence to look after the interests of their missions in India, the Gulf, and Africa, a post he held until he was appointed Apostolic Vicar of Arabia on 2 October 1975. To improve his English which was essential for his task, he spent some weeks in Ireland before his episcopal ordination in Florence on 22 February 1976.

=== Time in Arabia ===
On 21 March 1976, Gremoli arrived in Abu Dhabi, which after the expulsion of the mission personnel from Aden, had become the official residence of the Apostolic Vicar of Arabia. He was the first Bishop who resided in the Gulf, while the seven previous apostolic vicars all had their headquarters in Aden.

He remained for 29 years as Bishop of the world's largest jurisdiction until he returned to Italy for his retirement on 22 May 2005. Since then, he lived in the Capuchin friary of Montughi in Florence until his death.

== Death ==
Gremoli died on 6 July 2017 in Florence at the age of 91. His funeral was held on 8 July 2017 at the Capuchin Friary at Montughi, Florence.

Catholic Church titles
Preceded by Irzio Luigi Magliacani	Apostolic Vicar of Arabia; 2 October 1975 to 21 March 2005	Succeeded by Paul Hinder
