= Montale, Tuscany =

Montale
- Comune
- Comune di Montale
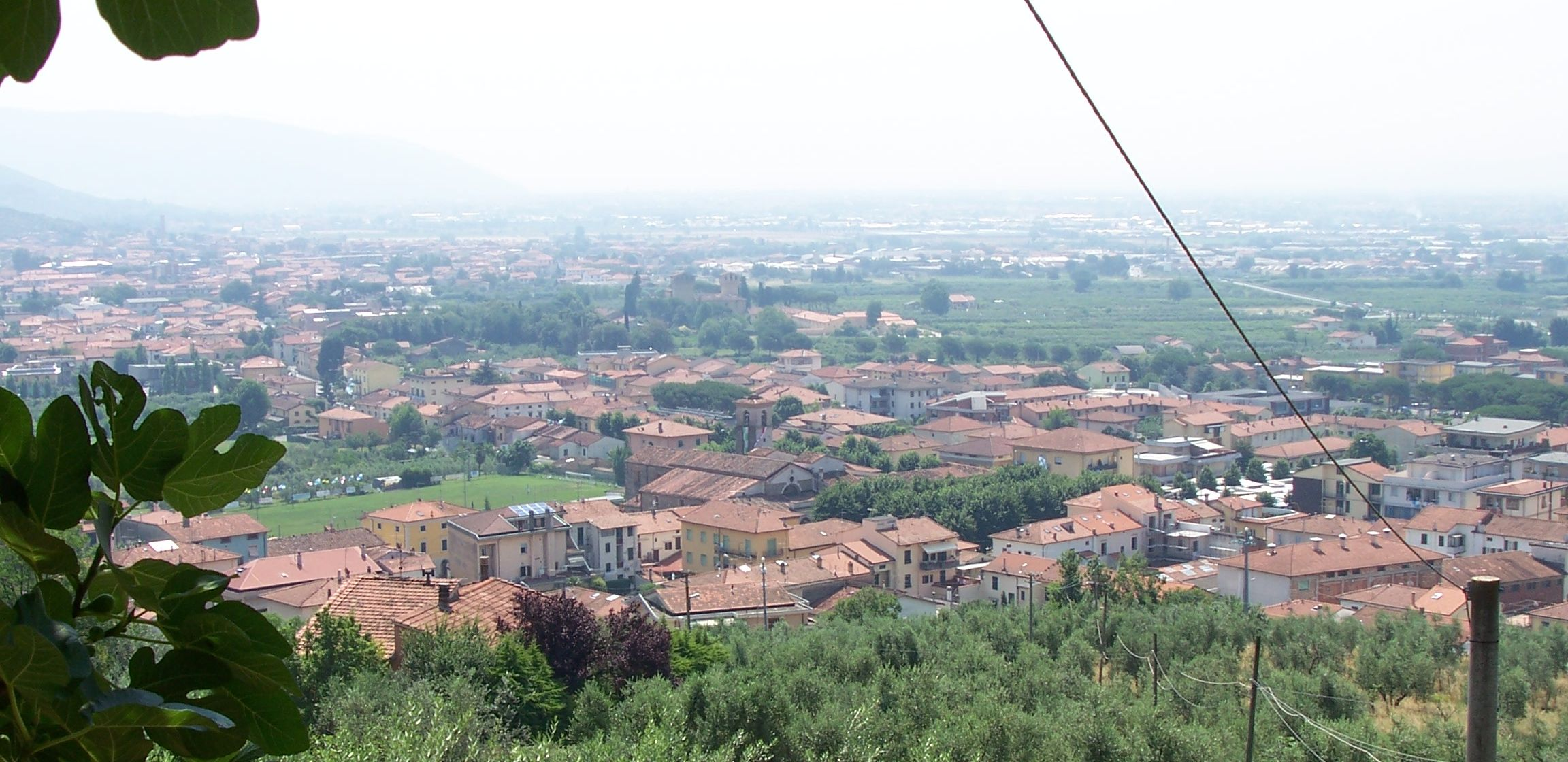
- View of Montale

- Coat of arms

- Location within Italy Location within Tuscany
- Coordinates: 43°56′N 11°1′E
- Country: Italy
- Region: Tuscany
- Province: Pistoia (PT)
- Frazioni: Fognano, Tobbiana, Stazione

Government
  - Mayor: Ferdinando Betti

Area
  - Total: 32.17 km^{2} (12.42 sq mi)
- Elevation: 85 m (279 ft)

Population (30 November 2017)
  - Total: 10,793
  - Density: 335.5/km^{2} (868.9/sq mi)
- Demonym: Montalesi
- Time zone: UTC+1 (CET)
  - Summer (DST): UTC+2 (CEST)
- Postal code: 51037
- Dialing code: 0573
- Website: Official website

Montale is a comune (municipality) in the Province of Pistoia in the Italian region Tuscany, located about 25 kilometres (16 mi) northwest of Florence and about 8 kilometres (5 mi) east of Pistoia.

Montale borders the following municipalities: Agliana, Cantagallo, Montemurlo, Pistoia.

== Main sights ==
- Castle of Smilea
- Casa al Bosco
- Church of Santa Cristina
- Abbey of San Salvatore in Agna
- Church of San Giovanni Evangelista

== Twin towns ==
- Senlis, France
- Varaždin, Croatia
