= Cantagallo, Tuscany =

Cantagallo
- Comune
- Comune di Cantagallo
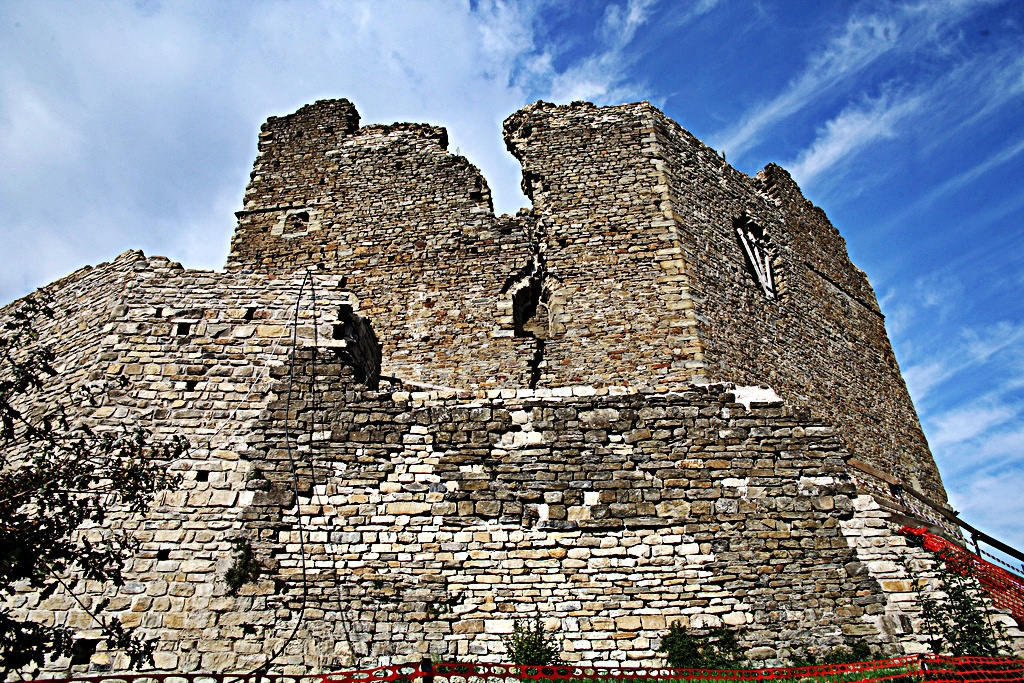
- Cerbaia Fortress

- Location within Italy Location within Tuscany
- Coordinates: 44°1′N 11°5′E
- Country: Italy
- Region: Tuscany
- Province: Prato (PO)
- Frazioni: Fossato, Gavigno, L'Acqua, Luicciana, Migliana, Gricigliana, La Rocca di Cerbaia, Carmignanello, Usella, Il Fabbro

Government
  - Mayor: Guglielmo Bongiorno (PD)

Area
  - Total: 95.67 km^{2} (36.94 sq mi)
- Elevation: 423 m (1,388 ft)

Population (2025)
  - Total: 3,118
  - Density: 32.59/km^{2} (84.41/sq mi)
- Demonym: Cantagallesi
- Time zone: UTC+1 (CET)
  - Summer (DST): UTC+2 (CEST)
- Postal code: 59025
- Dialing code: 0574
- Website: Official website

Cantagallo is a comune (municipality) in the Province of Prato in the Italian region Tuscany, located about 30 kilometres (19 mi) northwest of Florence and about 15 kilometres (9 mi) north of Prato. It has 3,118 inhabitants.

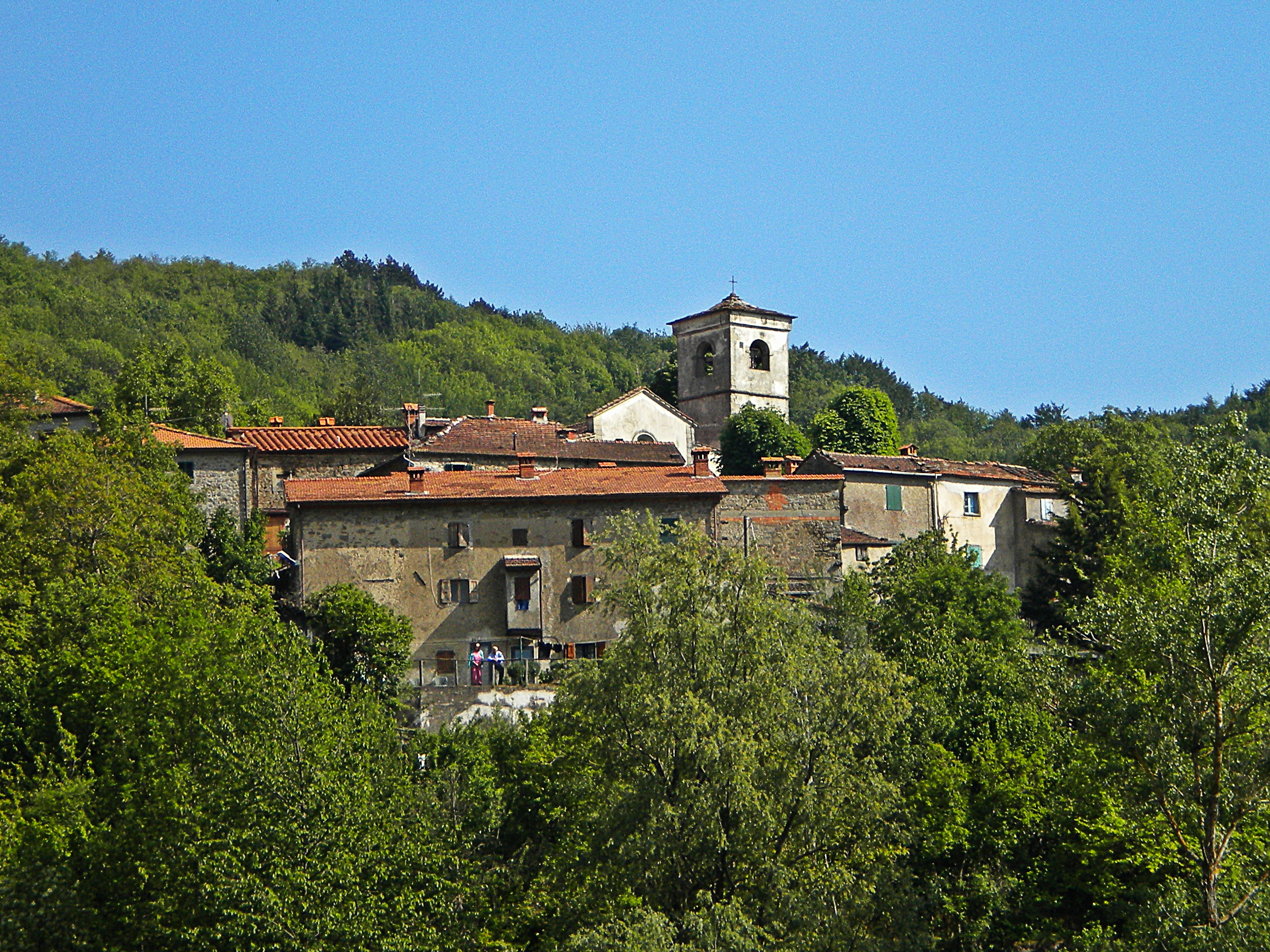
The village of Fossato

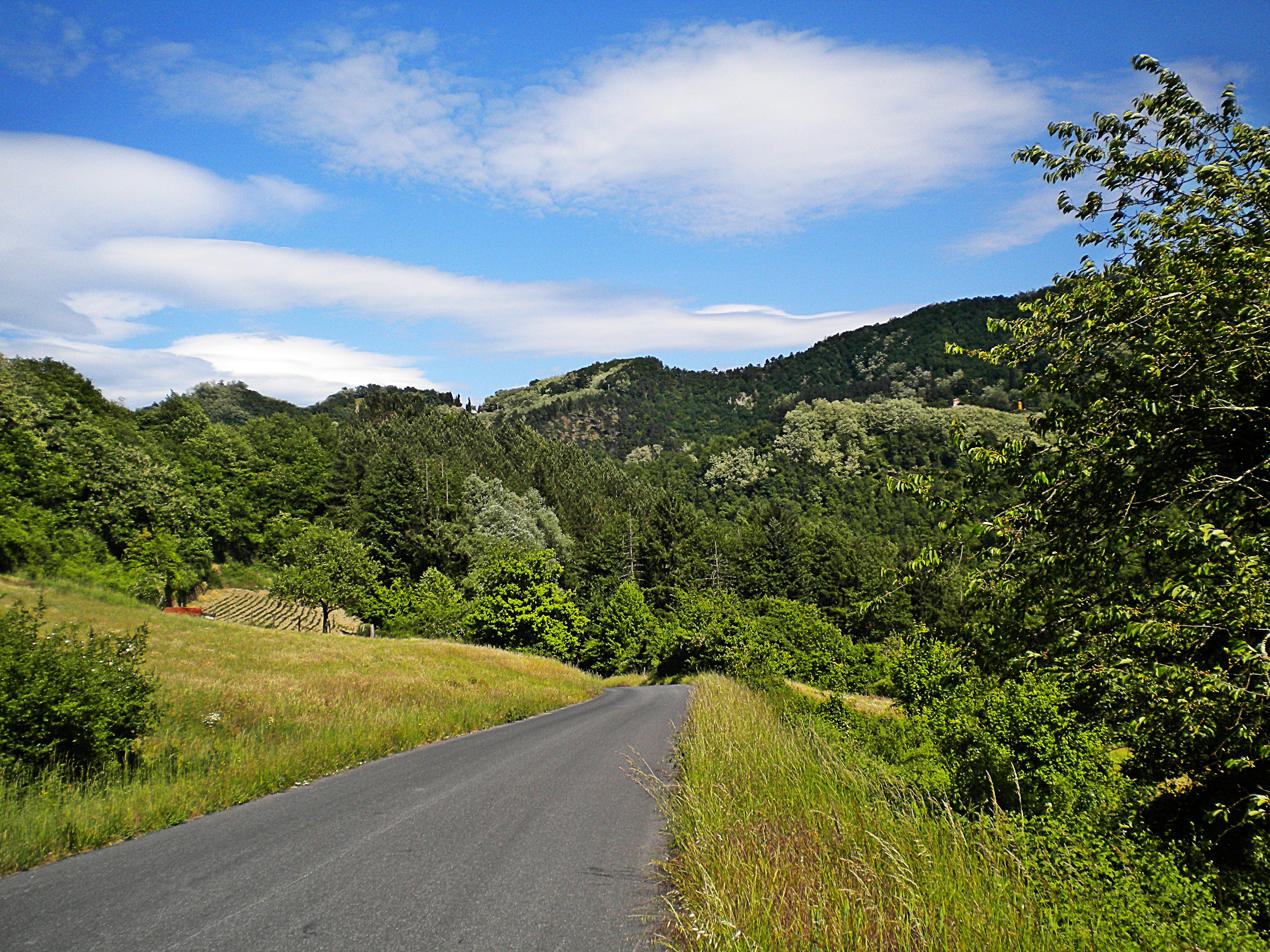
Landscape by Trairio

== Geography ==
Cantagallo borders the following municipalities: Barberino di Mugello, Camugnano, Montale, Montemurlo, Pistoia, Sambuca Pistoiese, Vaiano, and Vernio.

=== Frazioni ===
- Luicciana
- Cambiaticcio
- Carmignanello
- Castello Averardi
- Montagnana (Cantagallo)
- Cerbaia
- Codilupo
- Colle Bisenzio
- Fossato (Cantagallo)
- Gavigno
- Gricigliana
- Il Fabbro
- L'Acqua
- La Dogana Il Pucci
- La Villa (Cantagallo)
- Luicciana
- Migliana
- Pratale
- Trairio
- Usella
- Luogomano-Acquerino

=== Nature ===
- Reserve Luogomano-Acquerino
- Passo del Tabernacolo
- Pian della Rasa

== Demographics ==
Historical population

| Year | Pop. | ±% |
|---|---|---|
| 1861 | 3,784 | — |
| 1871 | 4,445 | +17.5% |
| 1881 | 4,093 | −7.9% |
| 1901 | 5,191 | +26.8% |
| 1911 | 5,499 | +5.9% |
| 1921 | 5,546 | +0.9% |
| 1931 | 5,035 | −9.2% |
| 1936 | 4,936 | −2.0% |

| Year | Pop. | ±% |
|---|---|---|
| 1951 | 4,466 | −9.5% |
| 1961 | 3,664 | −18.0% |
| 1971 | 3,015 | −17.7% |
| 1981 | 2,658 | −11.8% |
| 1991 | 2,536 | −4.6% |
| 2001 | 2,820 | +11.2% |
| 2011 | 3,102 | +10.0% |
| 2021 | 3,092 | −0.3% |

Source: ISTAT

== Culture ==
Events in the municipality include:

- Old villages and ancient flavors in Luicciana (November)
- Mountain in feast in Cascina Spedalletto-reserve Luogomano-Acquerino (July)
- Feast of the chestnut in Migliana (October–December)
- Feast of the garlic bread in Gavigno (August)
- Feast of the boar in Gavigno (July)
- Feast of the potato in La Villa (September)
- Feast of the zonzella in Gavigno (June)
- Sant'Anna feast in Cantagallo (July)
- Tour of the cribs in Migliana (December–January)

== Main sights ==
=== Churches ===
- San Biagio in Cantagallo
- San Lorenzo in Usella
- San Michele in Luicciana
- San Donato in L'Acqua
- San Lorenzo in Fossato
- San Michele in Codilupo
- San Rocco in Fossato
- Oratory of Sant'Agostino in Gavigno
- Santa Caterina d'Alessandria in Gricigliana
- Santa Caterina d'Alessandria in Carmignanello
- Santa Maria in Castello Averardi
- Santa Maria Assunta in Migliana
- Santa Maria Assunta oratory in Migliana - old church

=== Villas ===
- Villa Novellucci in Gricigliana
- Villa Guicciardini in Il Fabbro
- Villa Bini in Pratale

=== Other sights ===
- Sessanto bridge in Carmignanello
- Medieval bridge in Cerbaia
- Cerbaia fortress in Cerbaia
- Pispola mill in Cerbaia
- Adventure park in Gavigno - between Gavigno and Passo del Tabernacolo
