= San Lorenzo in Usella =

Church in Tuscany, Italy

Coordinates: 43°59′10.8″N 11°07′50.5″E

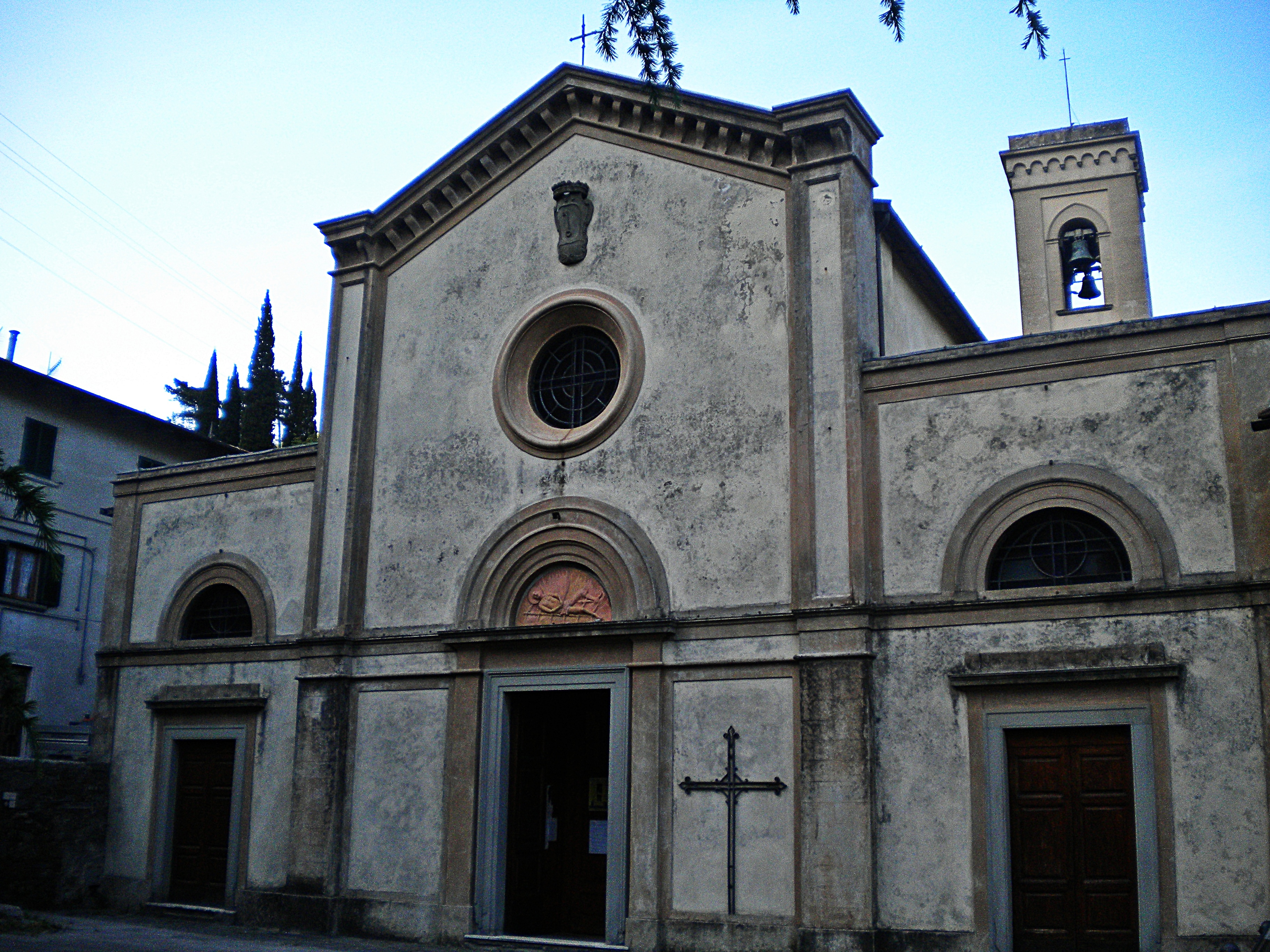
Facade

San Lorenzo in Usella is a Roman Catholic church located in Usella, Cantagallo, in Tuscany, Italy. This country church goes back to at least the year 997 and the village of Usella grew around it. There is a church, its bell tower and rectory. It was restored in the early 1900s. It is home to a 17th-century painting, the Virgin and Child with Saints Lorenzo and Barnaba, attributed to Jacopo Chimenti known as l'Empoli. Near the entrance is a baptismal font carved in the late-Mannerist style from 16th century marble.

== Historical profile ==
The Parish is already documented in 997 as the Parish of San Lorenzo in Pisignano.

=== Original structure ===
The first church at the site likely had a single nave, similar to other romanesque-style parish churches nearby, such as San Pietro in Figline and San Vito and Modesto a Sofignano and Hippolytus and Cassian Vernio

The present structure has a three-aisled result of renovations and changes starting with 20th-century belltower. The facade, erected in 1907, repeats the internal partition and is divided into three sectors: the central, much higher, and the lower side, the facade is set on the Renaissance proportions, and decorated with items that alluding to the Gothic and the Renaissance.

== Interior ==
=== Original structure ===
For the interior the same principles apply comparative adopted for the exterior, the interior was still characterized by a single nave with exposed brick in hand were visible wooden beams.

=== Current status ===
Internally the church has the same capacity that characterizes the classical exterior; the nave, of three arches, is covered with vaults lowered (original 700), the aisles-made during the restoration of 1907 - have a flat roof.

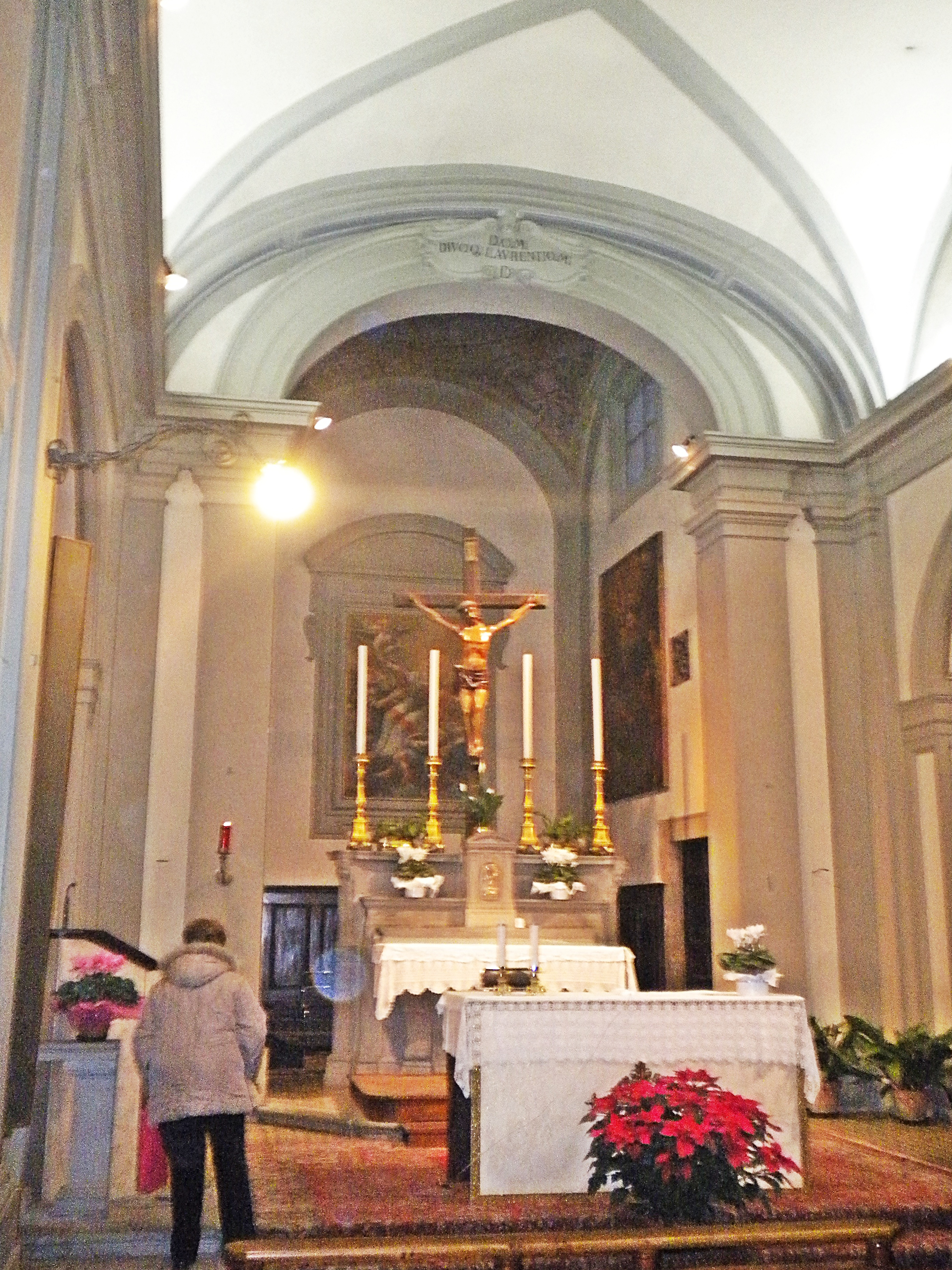
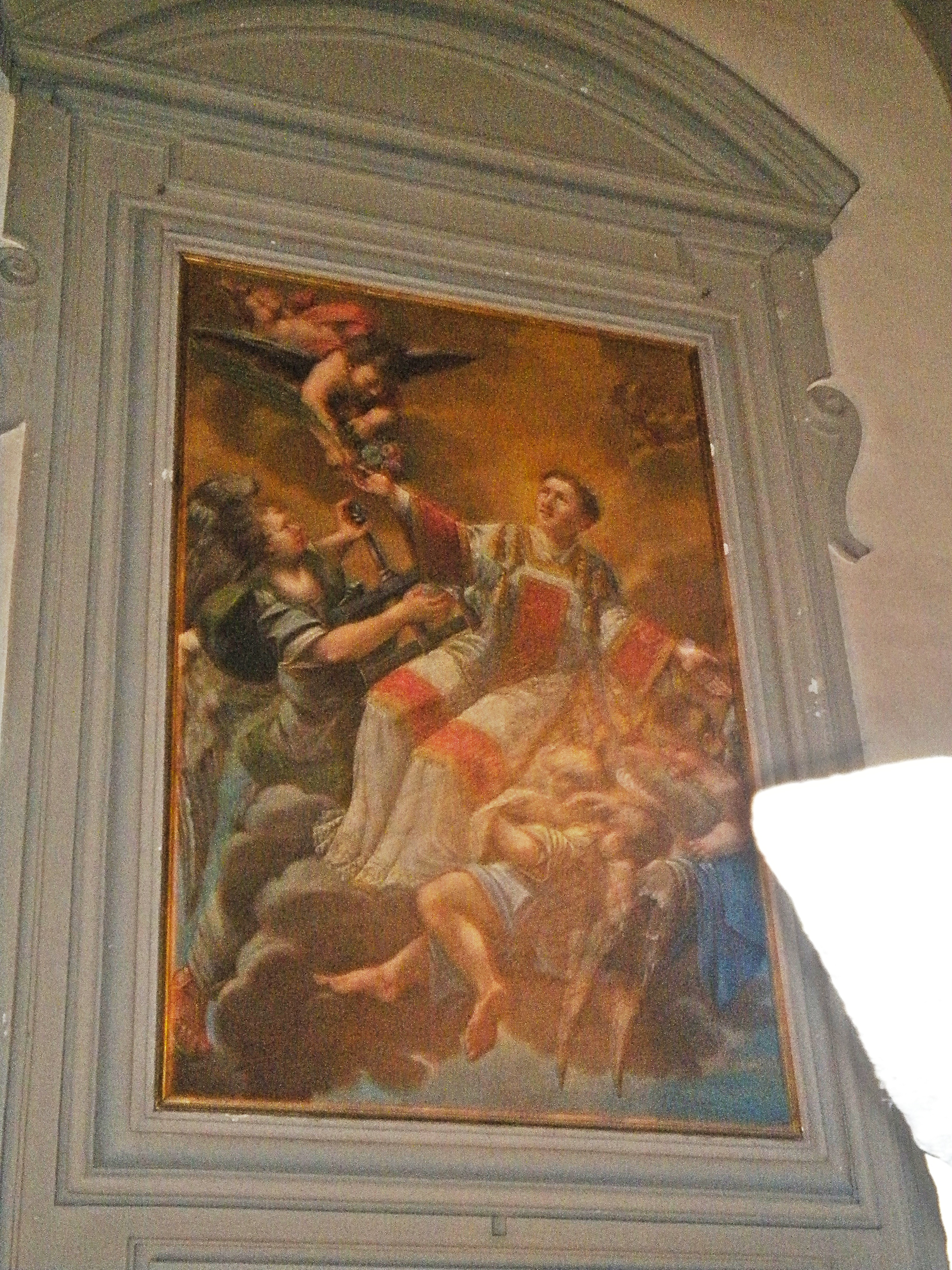
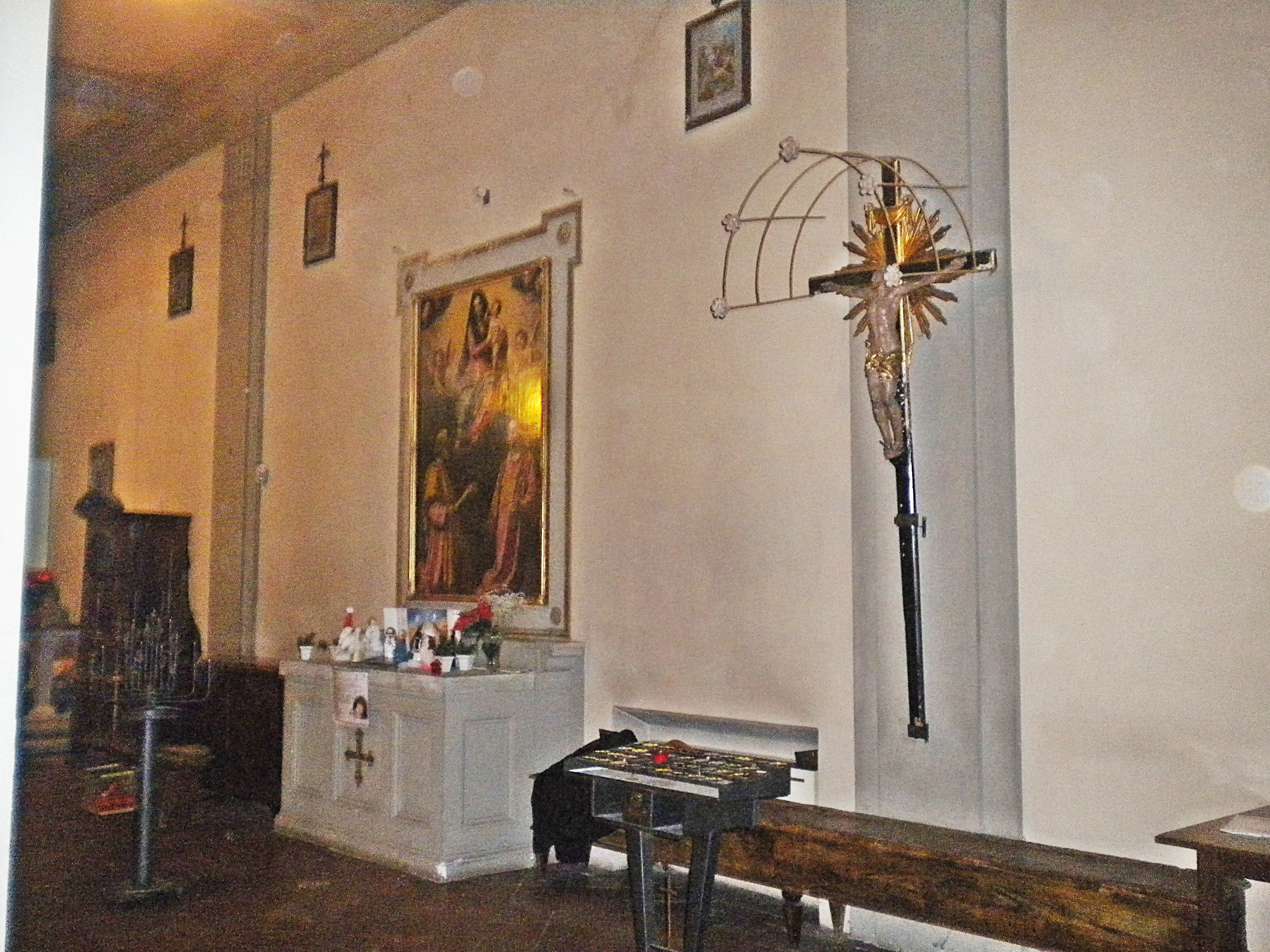
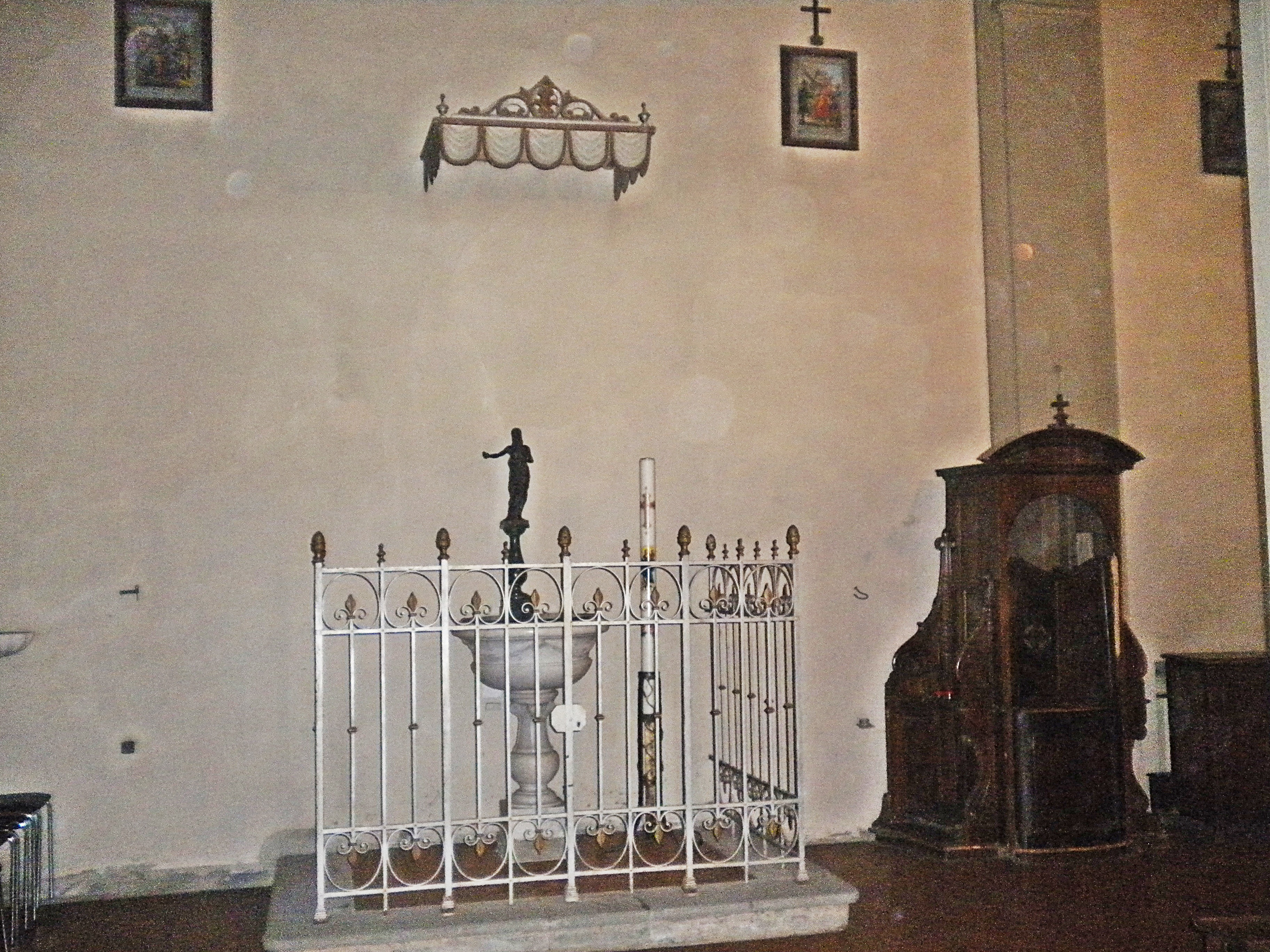
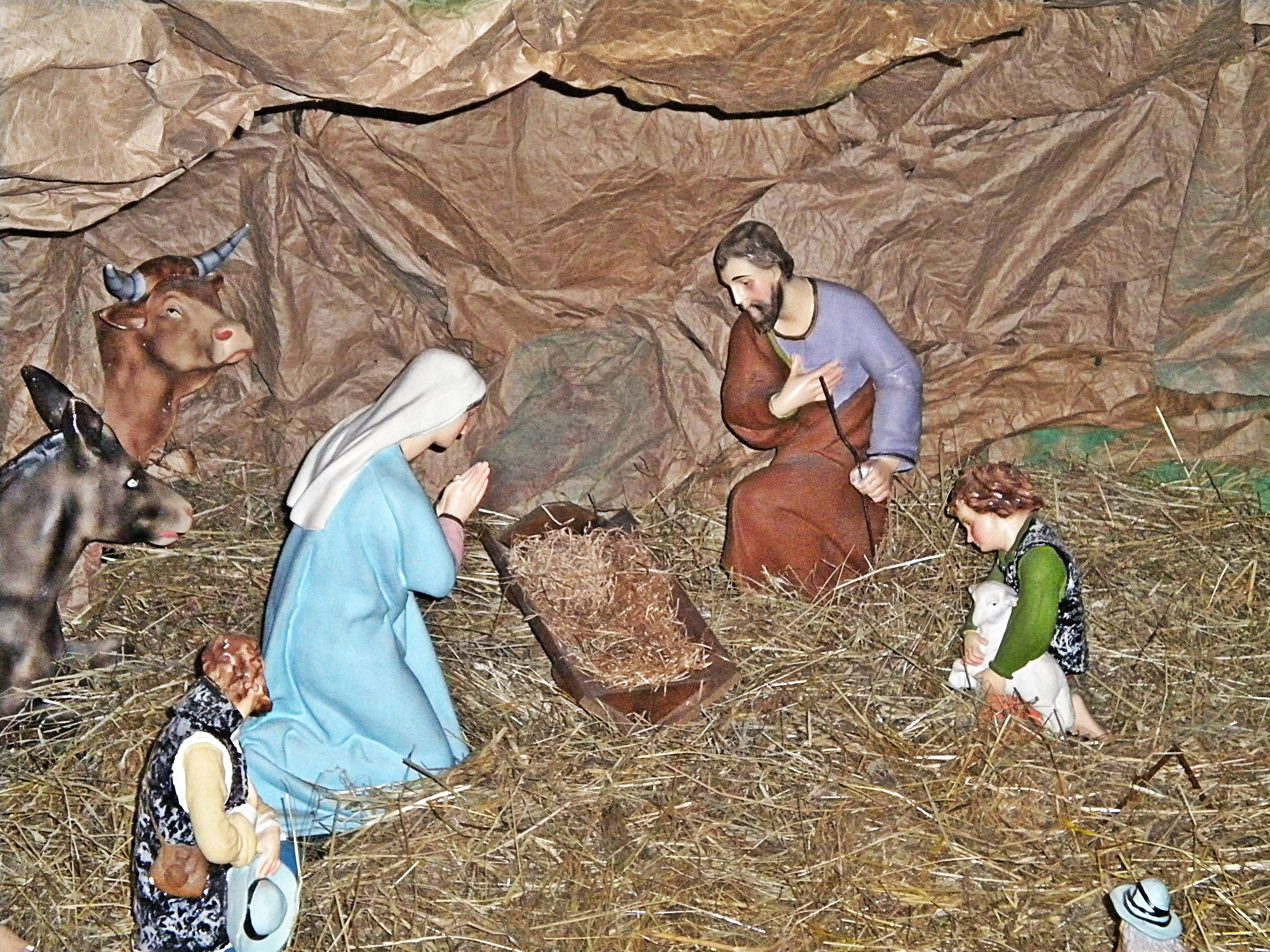
